= Eleutheropolis (diocese) =

Titular see of the Catholic Church

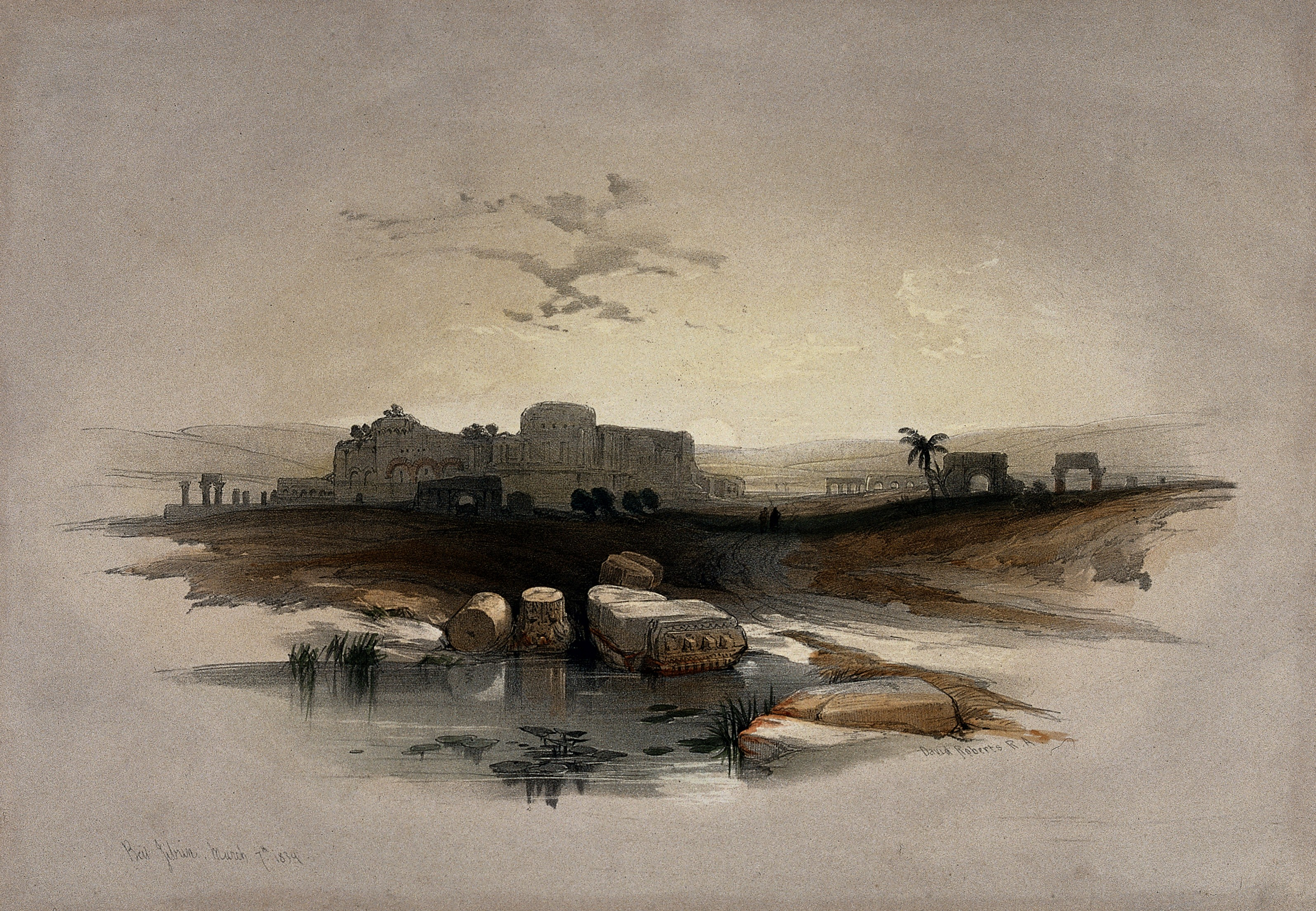
Ruins of Eleutheropolis in Palaestina (1843).

Eleutheropolis in Palaestina is a titular see of the Roman Catholic Church that was located in Bayt Jibrin, a depopulated Palestinian village now located in modern Israel. The position of bishop is vacant.

== History of the see ==
In A.D. 200 Septimius Severus founded a Roman colony at the site of Bayt Jibrin. A previous Jewish town, Maresha, had been destroyed by Vespasian 130 years earlier. The new colony grew quickly, due to its location on important trade routes and in 325 it became the site of an episcopal see in Palaestina Prima, with Macrinus as first bishop.

Eusebius of Caesarea an important early church writer who lived at this time and was based from this Bishopric used it as a starting point for measuring distances of other locations.

We know of only six bishops, with Macrinus, and Zebennus being the only ones named, there are another four for whom we don’t know their name.

Church texts mention 50 soldiers who were executed here in 638 for not abandoning the Christian religion following the arrival of Islam. Their burial site is in the vicinity of the town. The diocese ceased to function effectively from this time.

The last titular bishop was Alfred Matthew Stemper .

== Notable persons ==
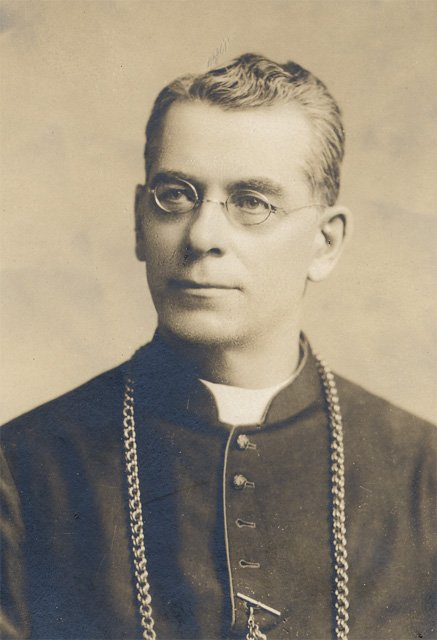
Bp. Paul-Eugène Roy.

- Bishop Epiphanius of Salamis
- Eutchius
- Peter of Eleutheropolis
- Justus of Eleutheropolis (the legend of him at Eleutheropolis is possibly untrue.)
- Matthias

=== Known bishops ===
- Zebennus
- Macrinus fl.359
- Paul-Eugène Roy (8 Apr 1908 Appointed – 26 Jun 1914)
- Nicolás de Carlo (2 Aug 1918 Appointed – 1 Aug 1940)
- Michel Thomas Verhoeks (16 Oct 1941 Appointed – 8 May 1952)
- Giuseppe de Nardis (1 Apr 19 numb 53 Appointed – 18 Dec 1956)
- Alfred Matthew Stemper (5 Jul 1957 Appointed – 15 Nov 1966)
