= Wadi el-Quff =

Forrested valley in the West Bank

Wadi el-Quff Nahal Telem, Nahal Natziv (in Hebrew)
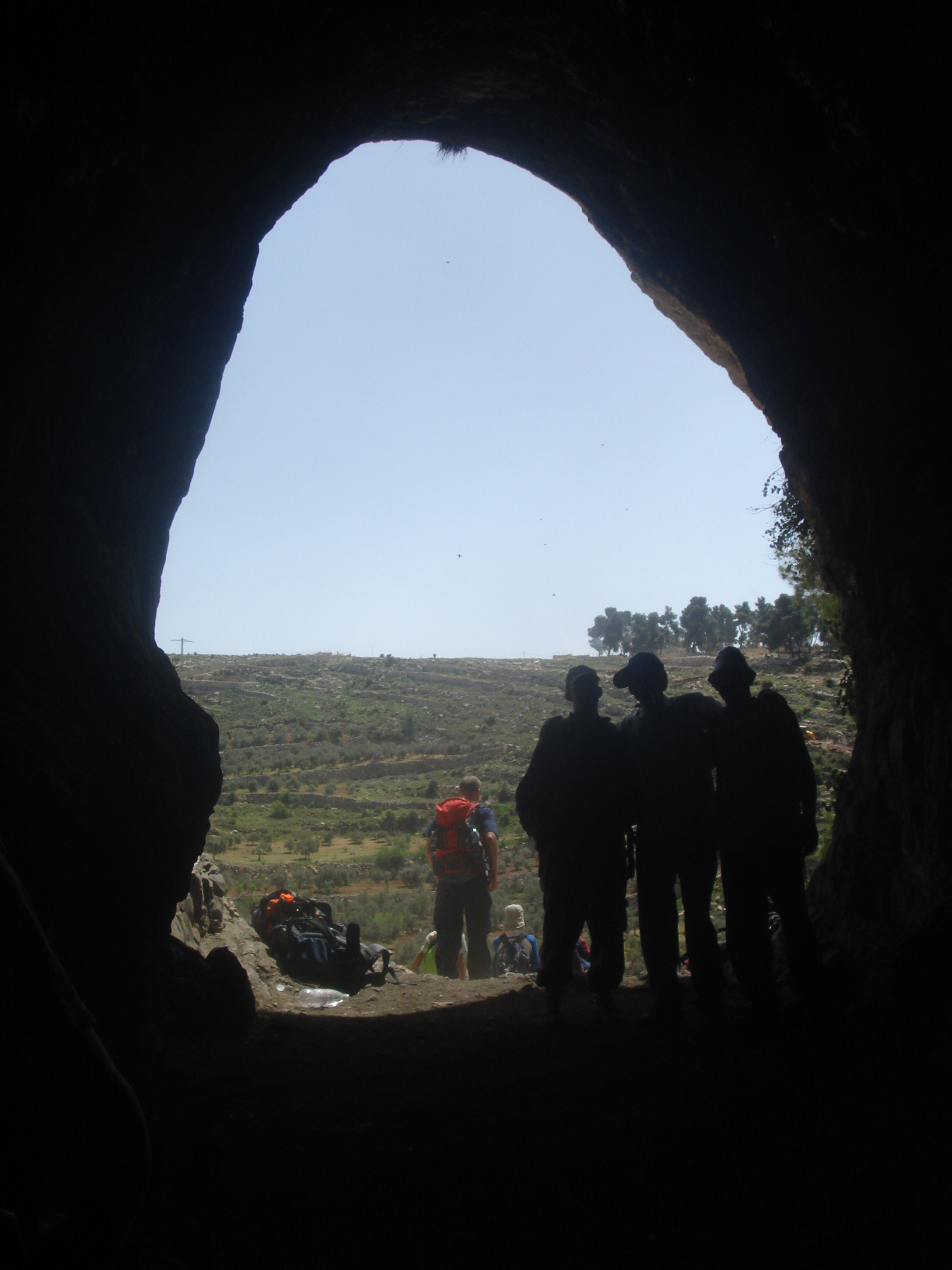
- Mouth of Tur es-Safa Cave
- Native name: وادي القف (Arabic)

Location
- Country: State of Palestine
- Region: West Bank
- District: Hebron Governorate
- City: Tarqumiyah

Physical characteristics
- Source: Judaean Mountains
  - location: Beit Kahil
  - coordinates: 31°33′53″N 35°02′50″E
- Mouth: Wadi Zeita/Nahal Guvrin
  - location: W of Tarqumiyah and N of Idna, West Bank
  - coordinates: 31°35′00″N 34°58′25″E

Wadi el-Quff (Arabic: وادي القف, romanized: Wadi el-Qāf, transliterated Qaf, Quf or Quff) is a wadi located in the West Bank beginning in the western part of the Judaean Mountains near Beit Kahil and flowing westward past Tarqumiyah. The confluence of the uppermost section of Wadi el-Quff with two othe wadis is near the Israeli settlement of Telem, and in Hebrew the wadi is known as Nahal Telem. The wadi contains the Wadi al-Quff Nature Reserve and the Tur es-Safa Cave (Arabic: Magharat Tur es-Safa - Maghārat Tūr eṣ Ṣafā, also spelled Ṭaur or Ṭawr, at 31°35′00″N 35°03′00″E), which is the largest cave on the western slopes of the Judaean Mountains. The El Quff Nature Reserve was planted in 1927 during the British Mandate by the Department of Government plantings, originally on an area of 1,000 dunams. In 1966 the Forestry Department of the Jordanian government expanded the forest by an additional 900 dunams.

The official Israeli name of the wadi is Nahal Netziv, after the biblical city of Nezib or Netziv (נְצִיב, 'Garrison' or 'Pillar'), mentioned in Joshua 15:42–44, and listed by Eusebius on the road from Hebron as "Nasib, 7 milestones from Eleutheropolis", widely identified by archaeologists with Khirbet Beit Nâsib or Khirbet Beit Nattif / Ras en-Nesib (grid 148.8/111.9). The name Nahal Netziv, however, is hardly used in practice.

== Geology and geography ==
The wadi developed along the border between the Judaean Mountains and the Shephelah.

== History ==
On December 28, 2007 a terrorist attack was carried out in the wadi in which two Jewish tourists were killed.

== See also ==
- Geography of Palestine: Rivers and lakes
