= Wadi al-Quff Reserve =

Nature reserve in Hebron Governorate

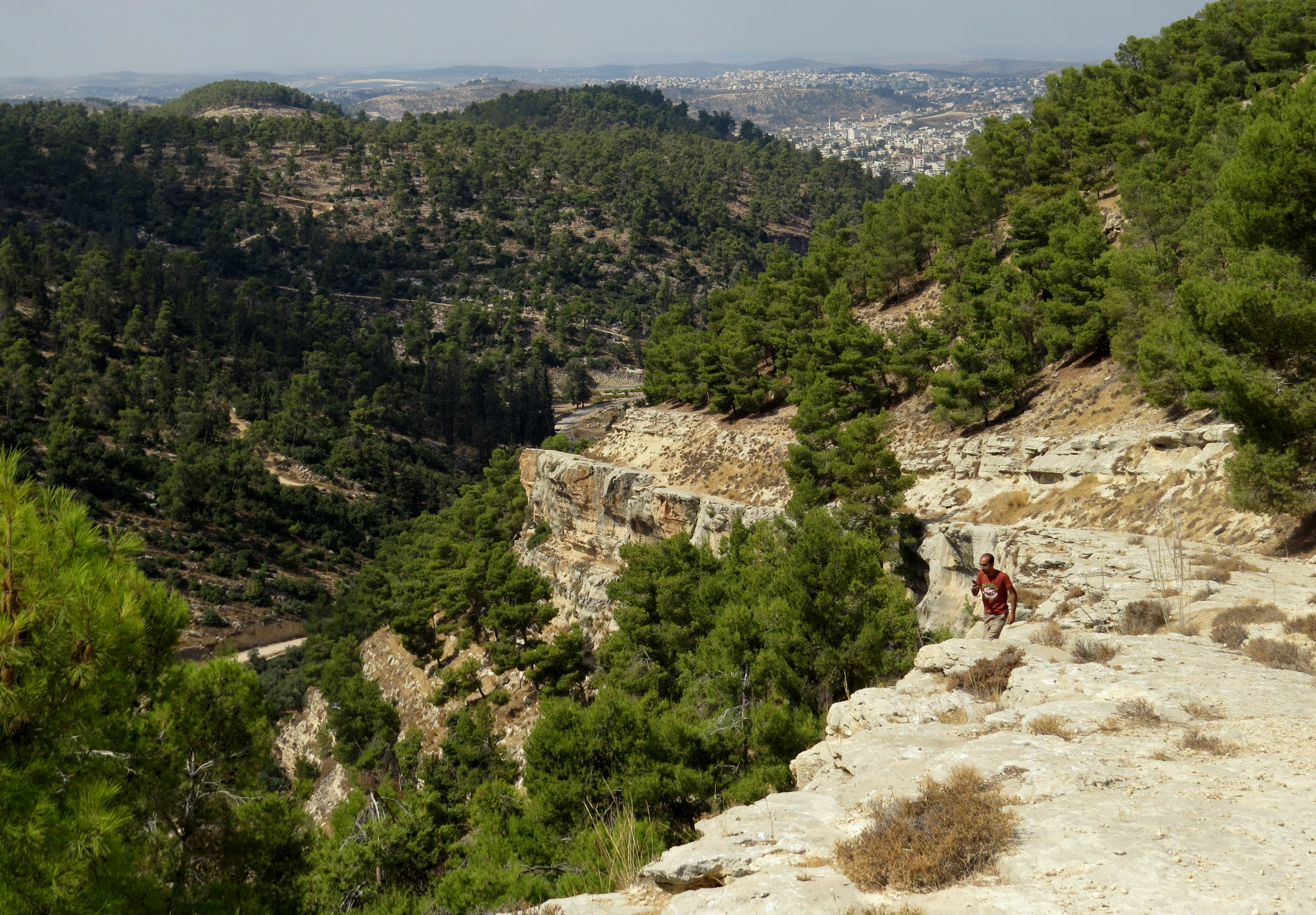
- Location: Hebron Governorate, West Bank
- Nearest city: Tarqumiyah

Wadi al-Quff Nature Reserve (Arabic: محمية وادي القفّ) is a nature reserve located in Wadi el-Quff near the town of Tarqumiyah in the Hebron Governorate, in the southern part of the West Bank.

== Geography ==
Located in Wadi el-Quff 6 km northwest of the city of Hebron, it is the largest green area in the West Bank, covering an area of more than 4,600 dunams.

== Wildlife and biodiversity ==
The reserve was planted with forest trees such as cypress, Aleppo pine, oak, tamarisk, carob, and terebinth. It contains dense forests, which provide a safe haven for a wildlife including many migratory birds and butterflies. Freshwater springs flow through it, irrigating the agricultural plants. It is considered a park for residents of the governorate and surrounding areas.
