= Tricomia =

Tricomia or Trikomia was a town in the Roman province in Palaestina Prima that at one time was thought to have been a suffragan see of Caesarea, but is non included in the Catholic Church's list of titular sees for lack of evidence that it was ever in fact a diocese. It has been identified with modern-day Tarqumiyah, near Hebron.

== Description ==
The town is mentioned in the Descriptio orbis romani of George of Cyprus, and seems to have been situated in southern Palestine, since the other cities that he mentions immediately before and after belong to that area.

The Descriptio orbis romani, a civil document, was mistaken for a Notitia episcopatuum, leading to Tricomia being considered for a while to be a titular see, as it still was in the early 20th century, when Siméon Vailhé wrote of it in the Catholic Encyclopedia. It is therefore no surprise that Le Quien could find no account of any bishop of Tricomia.

In his Chronographia, V, Malalas relates an ancient legend regarding Tricomia, which he calls Nyssa and confounds with Scythopolis. According to his account Tricomia was the site of a famous temple of Artemis.

It is now a village called Terkoumieh on a high hill between Hebron and Bayt Jibrin. It must not be confused with a Tricomia in Arabia which was the camping place of the equites promoti Illyriciani.
