= Beit Guvrin, Israel =

Kibbutz in southern Israel

Beit Guvrin: בֵּית גֻּבְרִין (Hebrew); بيت غوفرين (Arabic)
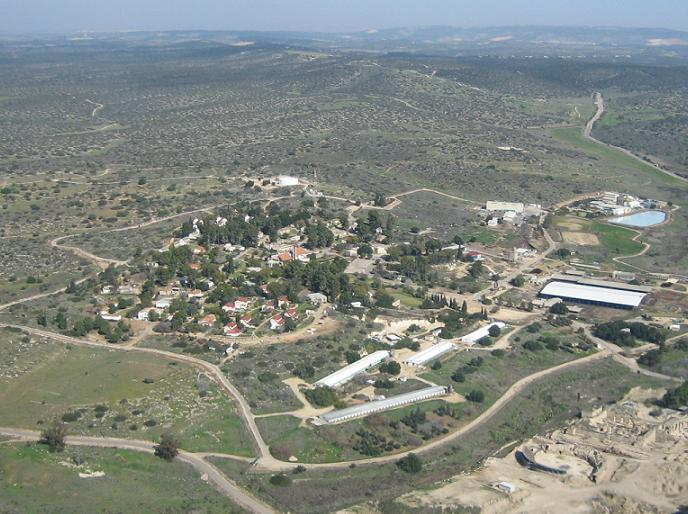

- Location within Ashkelon region of Israel Location within Israel
- Coordinates: 31°36′46″N 34°53′44″E
- Country: Israel
- District: Southern
- Subdistrict: Ashkelon
- Council: Yoav
- Affiliation: Kibbutz Movement
- Founded: 1949 (New Israeli kibbutz)
- Founder: Turkish and Romanian Palmach Members
- Population (2024): 505

Beit Guvrin (Hebrew: בֵּית גֻּבְרִין, 'lit. 'House of Men' in Aramaic) is a kibbutz in the Lakhish region, west of the ancient city of Beit Guvrin, for which it is named. Located 14 kilometres east of Kiryat Gat, it falls under the jurisdiction of Yoav Regional Council. In 2024 it had a population of 505.

== History ==
Kibbutz Beit Guvrin was founded in 1949, on the eve of Shavuot, by former Palmach members after the Palestinian Arab residents of Bayt Jibrin fled the military assault by Jewish forces during the 1948 Arab–Israeli War. The first residents were members of the "Yetzivim" youth group, which emigrated from Turkey in 1945, and the "Bnei Horin" youth group, which emigrated from Romania in 1946.

The kibbutz was established on the fields to the north of the Arab village of Beit Jibrin, which sat atop what was once a Hebrew town known as Beit Guvrin that was later renamed Eleutheropolis, "the city of free men" by the Romans in 200 CE. After the Arab Muslim conquest of the region, it became known in Arabic as Beit Jibrin. It was later the site of a Frankish (Crusader) colony, Bethgibelin, before being reconquered by the Muslims and returning to its Arabic moniker, Beit Jibrin.

== Economy ==
The economy was formerly based on chicken coops, cowsheds and field crops. BG Technologies is located on the kibbutz. Other kibbutz-run businesses are a banquet hall, a clothing and gift store, a jewelry store, a dental clinic and a public swimming pool.

== Landmarks ==
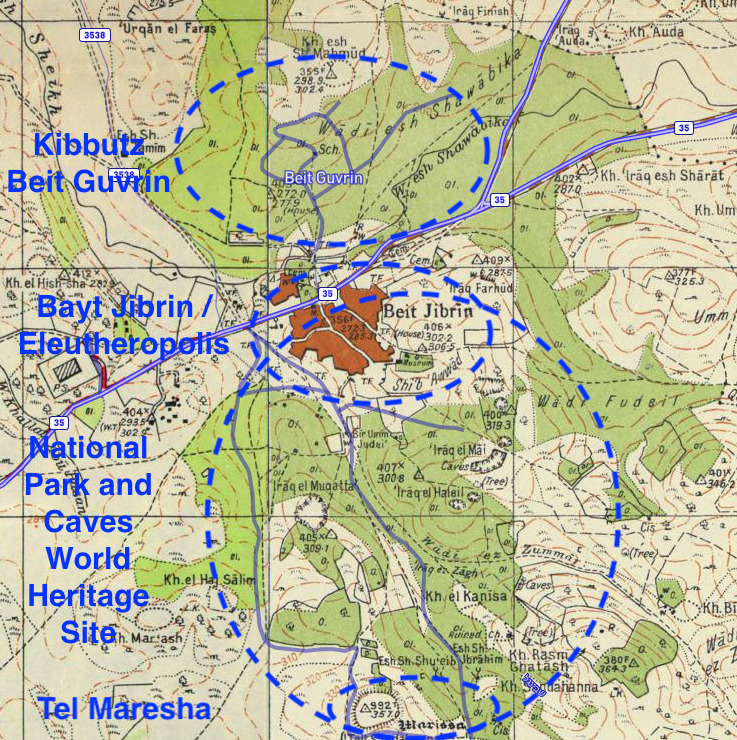
Map of kibbutz Beit Guvrin, historical Bayt Jibrin-Eleutheropolis, the ancient caves World Heritage Site, and Tel Maresha (1940s Survey of Palestine map with modern overlay)

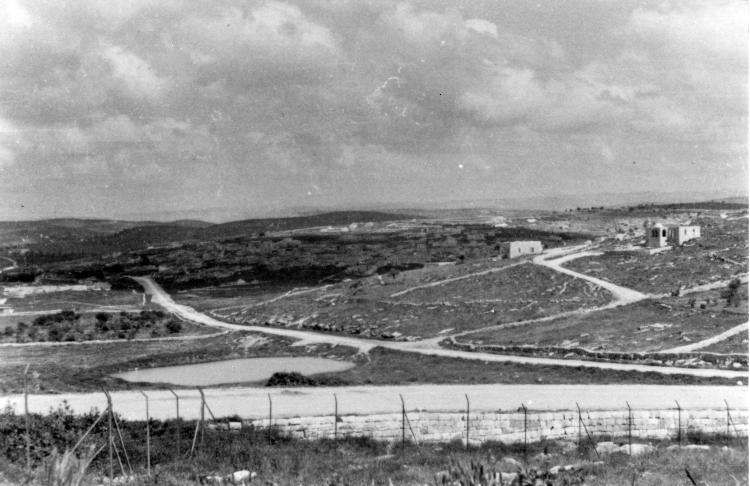
View of Kibbutz Beit Guvrin from police station. 1949

The kibbutz is surrounded by antiquities from the 1st century BC – 2nd-century CE town of Beit Guvrin. the Beit Guvrin-Maresha National Park is a popular tourist destination which includes Hellenistic-period caves with wall paintings, columbaria, a Roman city and ruins of a Crusader castle.

The area is surrounded by many Islamic shrines (maqam) like Nabi Jibrin, Sheikh Mahmoud, etc., but the holiest of them is Maqam Tamim al-Dari dedicated to a companion of Muhammad who had control over the Hebron district which included the Cave of the Patriarchs. Today all the Muslim shrines are abandoned.

Jesus Christ Superstar (1973) was filmed here.
