= Joseph Barsabbas =

1st-century Biblical figure

Saint Joseph Barsabbas Justus of Eleutheropolis

Apostle of the Seventy, the Just
- Born: c. 4 BC
- Died: c. 68 AD
- Venerated in: Eastern Orthodox Church; Roman Catholic Church
- Feast: 30 October (Eastern Orthodox Church); 20 July (Roman Catholic Church)

Portrait of biblical figures based on apocryphal writings: Mary of Clopas and Alphaeus with their infants, one of whom is possibly Joseph Barsabbas.

In the Acts of the Apostles, Joseph Barsabbas (Ancient Greek: Ἰωσὴφ τὸν καλούμενον Βαρσαββᾶν, romanized: Iōsēph ton kaloumenon Barsabban, also known as Justus of Eleutheropolis or Joseph the Just) was one of two candidates qualified to be chosen for the office of apostle after Judas Iscariot lost his apostleship when he betrayed Jesus and died by suicide. After the casting of lots Barsabbas was not chosen, the lot instead favoring St. Matthias to be numbered with the remaining eleven apostles.

^{21}Wherefore of these men who have companied with us, all the time that the Lord Jesus came in and went out among us,
^{22}Beginning from the baptism of John, until the day wherein he was taken up from us, one of these must be made a witness with us of his resurrection.
^{23}And they appointed two, Joseph, called Barsabas, who was surnamed Justus, and Matthias.
^{24}And praying, they said: Thou, Lord, who knowest the heart of all men, shew whether of these two thou hast chosen,
^{25}To take the place of this ministry and apostleship, from which Judas hath by transgression fallen, that he might go to his own place.
^{26}And they gave them lot, and the lot fell upon Matthias, and he was numbered with the eleven apostles.
—Acts 1:21–26 D–R

The English proper noun Justus shares the same origin than ancient Greek Ioustos (with the capital letter); Saint Joseph, the father of Jesus, was named the "righteous" in Matthew 1:19, an English translation of the Greek honorific title dikaios, which occurs frequently in the Gospels.

Both Joseph and Matthias had been followers of Jesus from the beginning of Jesus' public ministry after the baptism that he received from John the Baptist. He had continued as a member of the larger company of disciples even to the time that Jesus was taken up from them.

Further identification of Joseph is uncertain. In Christian tradition, he is numbered among the Seventy disciples mentioned in Luke 10:1–24, although the biblical text mentions no names. "After these things, the Lord appointed other seventy also, and sent them two and two before his face into every city and place, whither he himself would come." (10:1)

Biblical scholar Robert Eisenman has read the shadowy figure of "Joseph Justus" as either a not-so-subtle cover for James the Just, or a cloned conflation who represents in a single figure all the Desposyni (Brothers of Jesus)—rejected, according to the author of Acts in favor of the otherwise-unknown Matthias. Barnes’ Notes on the Bible says that he was “surnamed Justus” or who “was called Justus”: “This is a Latin name, meaning just, and was probably given him on account of his distinguished integrity.” The Anglican Bible scholar J. B. Lightfoot “supposes that he [Joseph Barsabbas] was the son of Alphaeus and brother of James the Less, and that he was chosen on account of his relationship to the family of the Lord Jesus.”

The fourth-century church historian Eusebius reports a story he attributed to Papias from very early in the second century, which he had, in turn, learned in Hierapolis from the daughters of Philip the Evangelist. It was said "he drank poison but by the Lord's grace suffered no harm." Whether this story might have inspired one feature in the secondary longer ending of Mark's Gospel - "These signs will accompany those who believe: ... they will pick up snakes with their hands; and when they drink deadly poison, it will not hurt them at all" - is possible but unproved.

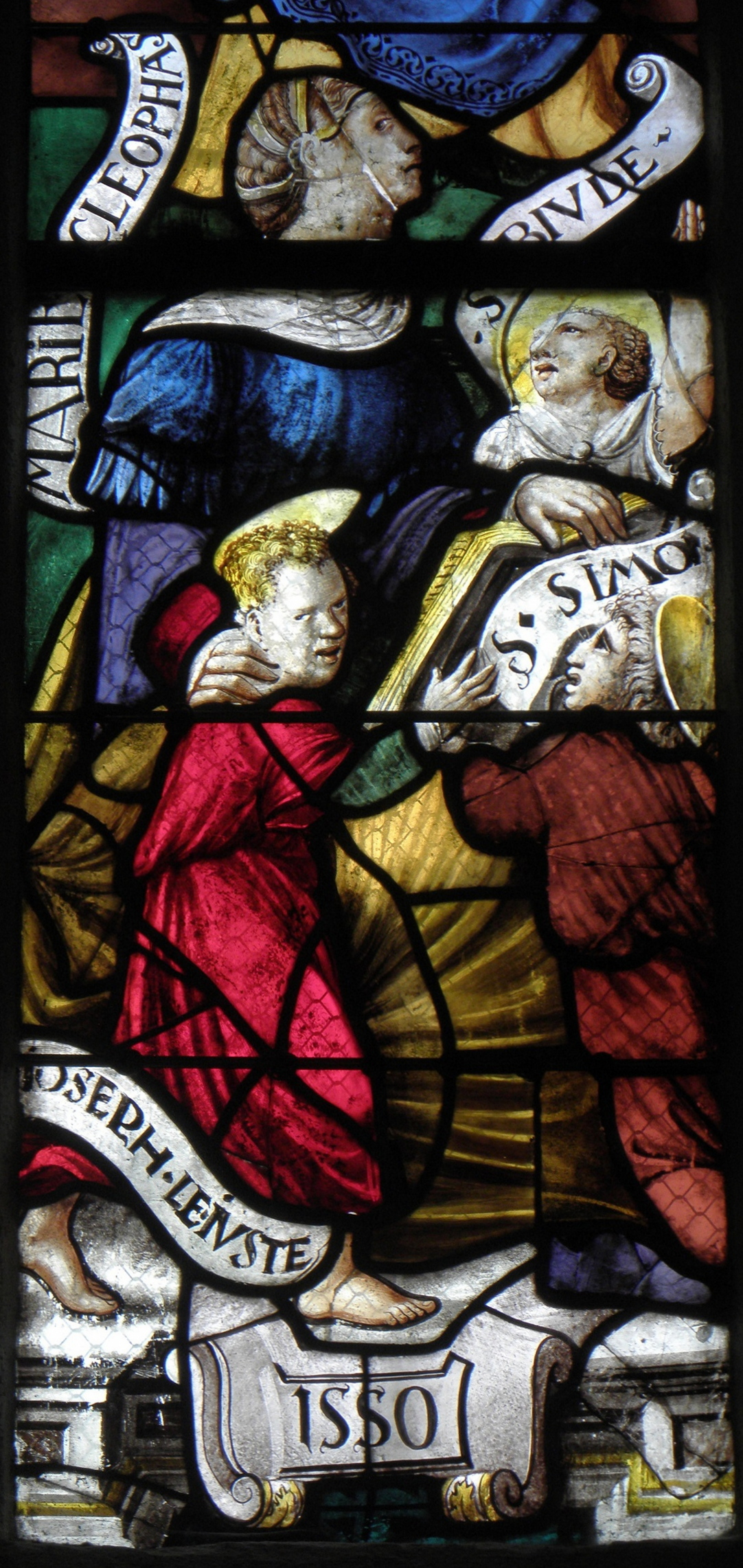
Stained glass of Mary Cleophas with her sons Simon, Jude and Joseph the Just

In Christian tradition, this Justus went on to become Bishop of Eleutheropolis, where he died a martyr and is venerated as Saint Justus of Eleutheropolis. The location provides a date for this legend, since the site of Eleutheropolis was a mere village called Betaris in the 1st century, whose inhabitants were slain and enslaved with others by Vespasian in AD 68 (Josephus). The site was refounded, as Eleutheropolis, in AD 200 by Septimius Severus. The first historical bishop, Macrinus, can be found in the 4th century, when Eleutheropolis was an important city.

The latest official edition of the Roman Martyrology commemorates Joseph called Barsabbas and also Justus under the date of 20 July, but limits its comments to the facts set out in the Acts of the Apostles. The Eastern Orthodox Church venerates him on 30 October with the name of Justus as well as on 4 January with the other disciples.
