= Tamim al-Dari =

Sahabi of Islamic Prophet Muhammad

Tamim al-Dari تميم الداري
- Born: Palestine
- Died: 661; Palestine
- Burial place: Bayt Jibrin, Palestine
- Known for: Companion of Muhammad and seeing the Dajjal
- Family: Lakhm (tribe)

Tamīm ibn Aws al-Dārī (Arabic: تميم بن أوس الداري, died 661) was an Arab Christian from Palestine and companion of Muhammad and an early convert from Christianity to Islam. In Islamic eschatology he is known for encountering Dajjal during one of his journeys. Tamim's story has become the bedrock of various Medieval narratives and legends, earning Tamim the title of "the intrepid traveler."

== Biography ==
Originally a Christian priest, al-Dari lived in Byzantine-ruled Palestine and belonged to the Banu al-Dar—a clan of the Lakhm tribe. His first contact with Muhammad was in 628 CE when he led a delegation of ten other Banu al-Dar members. Previously Muhammad granted Banu al-Dar a part of the revenues of conquered land after the Muslim victory at the Battle of Khaybar. Al-Dari met with Muhammad to receive the revenues and after meeting him, al-Dari embraced Islam and settled in Medina.

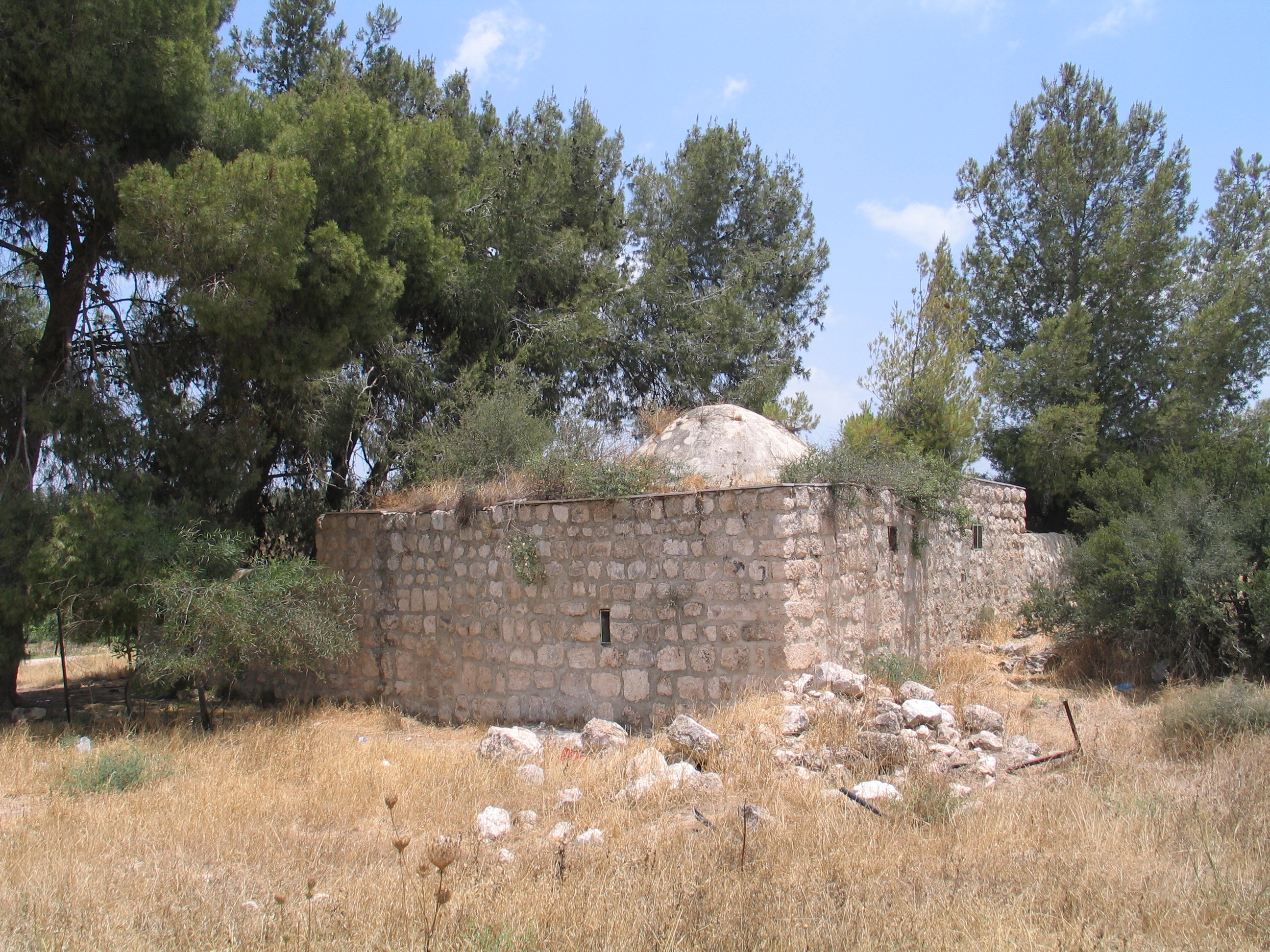
Maqam of Sheikh Tamim, traditionally taken to be Tamim al-Dari, by Bayt Jibrin

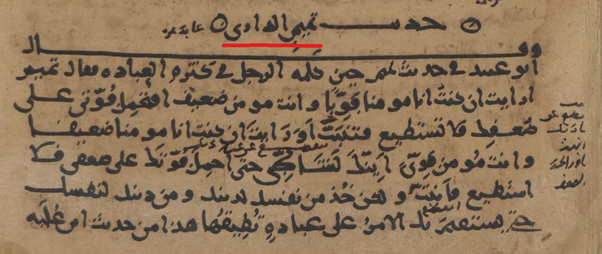
The name of Tamim Al-Dari highlighted in red. From the manuscript MS. Leiden Or. 298, dated 866 CE.

After his conversion, al-Dari became an adviser to Muhammad, particularly on public worship. His advice included the introduction of oil lamps in mosques. He is traditionally considered to be the first narrator of Islamic religious stories. Many of his stories included ones on the end of the world, Dajjal beasts and the coming of the Antichrist. His wife thought he was dead and married another man. The matter was communicated to Caliph Umar (r. 634–644), and he referred it to Ali who said that Muhammad had foreseen all that would happen to Tamim and left the wife to have her own choice between the two husbands. The wife ultimately decided to go back to al-Dari.

Prior to Muhammad's death, al-Dari was granted a large qita'a (akin to a fief) for control of Hebron, Beit Einun and the surrounding area, although at that time Palestine was still under Byzantine control. The deed was written up by Ali and when the Muslims conquered Palestine in 634, al-Dari acquired the territory. Originally, al-Dari's role as the owner of the qita'a was to collect the kharaj (land taxes). He was forbidden to enslave any of the locals or sell their property.

In 655, al-Dari left Medina to reside in his native Palestine where he died in 661. According to tradition, he is buried in the town of Bayt Jibrin (in the vicinity of Hebron). Today his maqam (shrine) is abandoned and located just north to Kibbutz Beit Guvrin. According to the Egyptian historian Ibn Lahi'a (714–790), members of al-Dari's family were still the owners of his estates in Hebron and Beit Einun during the historian's lifetime.

== The narrative of Dajjal ==
According to Sunni sources, Tamim ad-Dari had embarked on an expedition that was shipwrecked on a mysterious island. On this island, he is taken by a strange creature al-Jassasah to meet a chained man inside of a monastery, who is said to have been intrigued by the arrival of the tribesman. The chained man is eager to ask them questions about the outside world, asking about the natural condition of various locations, and the arrival of Muhammad. After the tribesmen answer him, the chained man announces he is the Dajjal, and provides them eschatological details related to the future, warning them of his advent. The tribesmen left the island and related their story back to Muhammad who brought it back to the populace.

== Property rights in Palestine ==
During an audience with Muhammad, it is said that Tamim had asked him for a deed to two villages or estates in the area of Palestine. This was an unusual request because they were granted ownership over property that at the time was considered far from Muhammad's control.

One of the variant sources says:

In the name of Allah, the Merciful, the Beneficent. Mentioned in this deed (kitab) is what the Messenger of Allah (Muhammad) bestowed upon the Daris. Since Allah gave to him (the Prophet) the earth, he (then) bestowed upon them [the Dari clan] Bayt 'Ayniin, Hibrun [or Habrun], al-Martum and Bayt Ibrahim-whoever is (living) inside them-forever. 'Abbas b. 'Abd al-Muttalib, Khuzayma b. Qays, and Hasana witnessed this.

As the land was not in the Muhammad's possession at the time, Muslim hagiographical sources, including modern scholars, mention this apparent feat of foreknowledge as a proof to bolster Muhammad's claim of Prophethood. Tamim legally acquired the property under the reign of the second Caliph Umar and embarked on his journey towards his land after the death of the third Caliph, Uthman. It is difficult to trace back the history of the property Tamim received as the city of Hebron is rarely mentioned in Islamic historical sources. However, various disputes over the rights of the land are recorded throughout the ages.

When the Seljuk Turks became dominant in Jerusalem (1073 CE), the Daris claim to the land came to face serious disputes; in certain cases, it seems that the rulers of the land had aimed to dispossess the Daris from their land. One example of an issue raised was by the Qadi of Jerusalem, Abu Hatim al-Harawi al-Hanafi issued a fatwa in which he claimed Muhammad could not rightfully bestow the land to the Daris as it had not been under his rule at that time. This argument was considered extremely audacious, depending more on political interests than Islamic jurisprudence, and was subsequently refuted at length by everyone who had commented on the subject thereafter. Eventually, the Daris' right to the property was defended by the great mystic and scholar, Al-Ghazali who happened to be in Jerusalem during this period. Ghazali's defense of the Daris' right to the property marked an interesting rift within Islamic jurisprudence during this time. Prominent Shafi'i jurists, like Ghazali and Suyuti were defending the right of Tamim ad-Dari's family to the land in Hebron, and then Hanafis, largely influenced by the rulership contested this right. Defending the property rights of the Tamimi family was considered especially important as the land deed provided a unique, written precedent dated from the time of Muhammad for the system of the waqf- considered central to Islam.

== See also ==
- List of Sahaba
- Sunni view of the Sahaba

== Bibliography ==
- E.J. Brill's First Encyclopaedia of Islam, 1913-1936 By M. Th Houtsma E.J. Brill's First Encyclopaedia of Islam, 1913-1936 By M. Th Houtsma p647
- Clermont-Ganneau, C. S. (1896). [ARP] Archaeological Researches in Palestine 1873-1874, translated from the French by J. McFarlane. Vol. 2. London: Palestine Exploration Fund. p. 463.
- Gil, Moshe (1997) [1983]. A History of Palestine, 634–1099. Translated by Ethel Broido. Cambridge: Cambridge University Press. ISBN 0-521-59984-9.
- Elad, Amikam (1996). "Pilgrims and Pilgrimage to Hebron (al-Khalil) during the Early Muslim Period (638–1099)". In LeBeau, Bryan F.; Mor, Menahem (eds.). Pilgrims & Travelers to the Holy Land. Omaha: Creighton University Press. pp. 21–62. ISBN 1-881871-15-0.
- Moudjir ed-dyn (1876). Sauvaire (ed.). Histoire de Jérusalem et d'Hébron depuis Abraham jusqu'à la fin du XVe siècle de J.-C.: fragments de la Chronique de Moudjir-ed-dyn. p. 227 ff.
- Petersen, Andrew (2001). A Gazetteer of Buildings in Muslim Palestine (British Academy Monographs in Archaeology). Vol. 1. Oxford University Press. ISBN 978-0-19-727011-0.
- Sharon, M. (1999). Corpus Inscriptionum Arabicarum Palaestinae, B-C. Vol. 2. Brill. ISBN 90-04-11083-6.
