= 2007 Nahal Telem shooting =

Palestinian militant attack

Coordinates: 31.5717°N 35.0314°E

- Location: Nahal Telem, West Bank
- Date: December 28, 2007
- Attack type: Shooting attack
- Deaths: 2 off duty Israeli soldiers (+ 1 attacker)
- Perpetrator: Three Palestinian assailants.

The 2007 Nahal Telem shooting was a Palestinian militant attack which was carried out on December 28, 2007 in which two Israeli soldiers were killed while they were on vacation, when hiking in the Nahal Telem wadi. One of the assailants was killed in the immediate exchange of fire, and two others later on turned themselves in to the Palestinian Authority, were indicted by the PA, and were sentenced to 15 years in prison each. Two of the attackers belonged to the Fatah, one of them was a soldier in the Palestinian National Security Forces.

== The attack ==
On Friday morning, 28 December 2007, Ahikam Amihai and David Rubin, two IDF soldiers and residents of Kiryat Arba, were traveling in civilian clothes (but with their military weapons) while on vacation, along with another young girl named Naama Ohayon, to the Nahal Telem wadi, which starts in Area C under Israeli control, and spreads into in Area B, where the Palestinians have civic responsibility, but Israel maintains security responsibility. Rubin, aged 21, served as a combat soldier in Shayetet 13. Amihai, aged 20, who was the grandson of Rabbi Moshe-Zvi Neria, served as a commander in the Israeli elite Air Force commando unit Shaldag.

During their trip an SUV passed by the travelers, and the attackers in it opened fire at the travelers. Amihai and Robin returned fire using their own military weapons. In the exchange of fire, Amihai, Rubin, and the militant who was driving the SUV were killed. Before the attackers left the scene of the attack, they shot Amihai and Robin at close range to make sure they were all dead, and they stole their military weapons. During the battle, Ohayon was hidden behind a rock in the riverbed, and after the attackers fled the scene she contacted the Israeli security forces.

Following the attack the Israeli security forces deployed roadblocks and attempted to capture the attackers, but inadvertently the militants managed to pass through a roadblock without being caught.

== The perpetrators ==
An investigation conducted after the incident revealed that although Fatah, the Islamic Jihad and the Hamas claimed responsibility immediately after the attack, the attack was actually carried out by three Palestinians, Ali Hamid Rajeb Dandis Aa, Omar Badr Halim Taha, and Samer Nabil al Natsha. The first two were Palestinian policemen at the time, as well as Fatah members. Al Natsha, who was killed by the return fire, was a member of the al-Quds squads of the Islamic Jihad and the son of businessman Nabil al-Natsha. Dandis and Taha turned themselves to Palestinian Authority security forces, returning the weapons they stole from the dead.

After the surviving attackers turned themselves over to the PA, the Palestinian Authority announced that they would not extradite the attackers to Israel. On January 22, 2008 the attackers were convicted in a Palestinian military court and sentenced to 15 years in prison each.

Later on the Shin Bet claimed that the attackers ambushed the travelers in the wadi, in order to carry out the attack. When one of the attackers spotted the travelers approaching the wadi he immediately reported it to the other attackers, whom came over and assisted him carrying out the attack.

== Official reactions ==
Involved parties

Israel:

- During the cabinet meeting held after the attack Israeli Prime Minister Ehud Olmert talked about the attack and stated, among other things, "The incident underscores what the Israeli government has been saying all through the political process between Israel and the Palestinians: As long as the Palestinian Authority does not take the necessary measures necessary against the terrorist organizations, the Israeli government will not be able to perform changes which would expose Israel to dangers and produce problems for Israel's security". Olmert also stated that "The soldiers fought bravely and were killed by terrorists."

Palestinian territories:

- The Palestinian Authority condemned the attack.

== Aftermath ==
Following the attack Israel filed a complaint to the head of the United Nations Security Council and to the Secretary-General of the United Nations. In the letter of complaint it was stated that "While Israel remains committed to advancing the peace process and committed to the principles of the Annapolis Conference and holds continuous meetings with the Palestinian Authority, they do not fight to prevent terrorism or to meet the various obligations including the Road map for peace plan.

== See also ==
- Palestinian political violence
