= Zebennus =

Zebennus was a third-century AD bishop and Christian Martyr from Palaestina Prima.

Little is known about his early life, career or episcopacy in Eleutheropolis. However, he is credited that during his episcopacy he had a dream revealing the burial place of Micah and Habbakuk.

He was martyred, executed on the Ides of November, with two others, Germanus and Antoninus, a presbyter. Their feast day is November 13.
