= Tarqumiyah =

West Bank city in the Hebron Governorate

Tarqumiyah ترقوميا

Arabic transcription(s)
  - Arabic: ترقوميا
- Sha'ab al-Beer area in the village of Tarqumiya

- Location of Tarqumiyah within Israel
- Coordinates: 31°34′30″N 35°00′47″E
- Palestine grid: 151/109
- Governorate: Hebron

Government
  - Type: City

Population (2017)
  - Total: 19,311
- Name meaning: Tricomia

Tarqumiyah (Arabic: ترقوميا, romanized: Tarqūmiyā) is a city located 12 kilometers northwest of Hebron, in the southern West Bank, in the Hebron Governorate in the State of Palestine. The city had a population of 19,311 in 2017.

== History ==
Tarqumiyah is an ancient town situated on a rocky hill. Cisterns have been found here. According to the PEF's Survey of Western Palestine (SWP), this place is the early Christian Tricomias, an episcopal see.

=== Middle Ages ===
A Mamluk endowment record attests to the village's inhabited status in 1262 CE.

=== Ottoman Empire ===
In the 16th century, Tarquimyah was a small village. In the census of 1596 the village appeared to be in the Nahiya of Halil of the Liwa of Quds. It had a population of 17 families, all Muslim. They paid a fixed tax-rate of 33,33% on agricultural products, including wheat, barley, olive trees, goats and beehives, in addition to occasional revenues; a total of 6,500 akçe.

In 1838 Edward Robinson passed by and noted that Tarqumiya was on the most common path from Gaza, via Bayt Jibrin to Hebron. While resting at Tarqumiya, he was visited by the local Sheikh and other dignitaries, who “demeaned themselves kindly and courteously." He further noted it as a Muslim village, between the mountains and Gaza, but subject to the government of el-Khulil.

In 1863 Victor Guérin found it to have 400 inhabitants, while an Ottoman village list from about 1870 counted 45 houses and a population of 108, though the population count included men, only.

In 1883 SWP described Tarqumiyah as “A small village on a rocky hill near the low lands. On the east, about a mile distant, is a spring; on the south are olives.”

=== British Mandate ===
According to the 1922 census of Palestine conducted by the British Mandate authorities, Tarqumiyah had a population of 976 inhabitants, all Muslims, increasing in the 1931 census to 1,173, still entirely Muslim, in 225 inhabited houses.

In the 1945 statistics the population of Tarqumiyah was 1,550 Muslims, and the total land area was 21,188 dunams of land according to an official land and population survey. 1,029 dunams were plantations and irrigable land, 6,614 were used for cereals, while 152 dunams were built-up (urban) land.

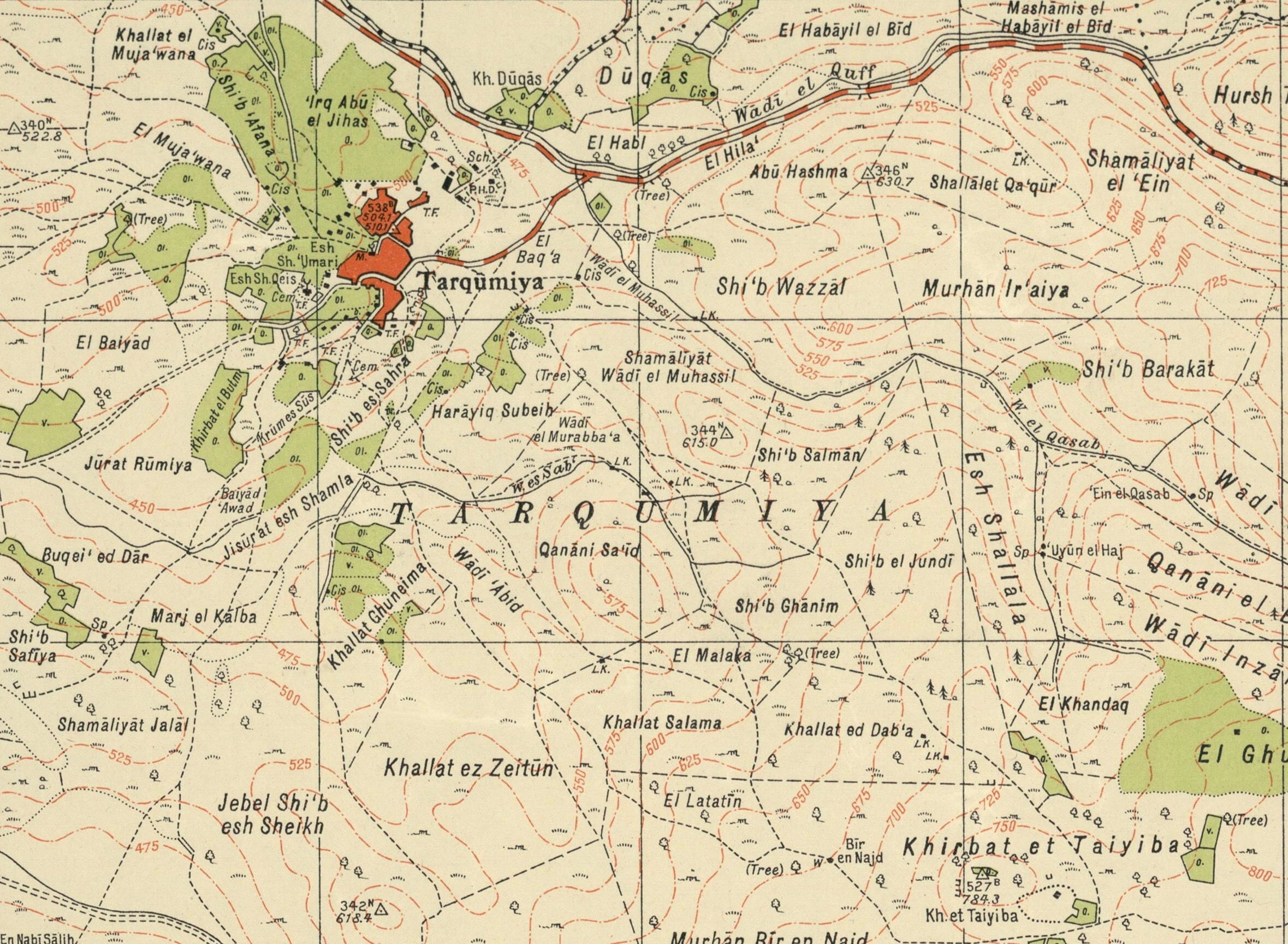
Tarqumiyah, British Mandate map, 1:20,000

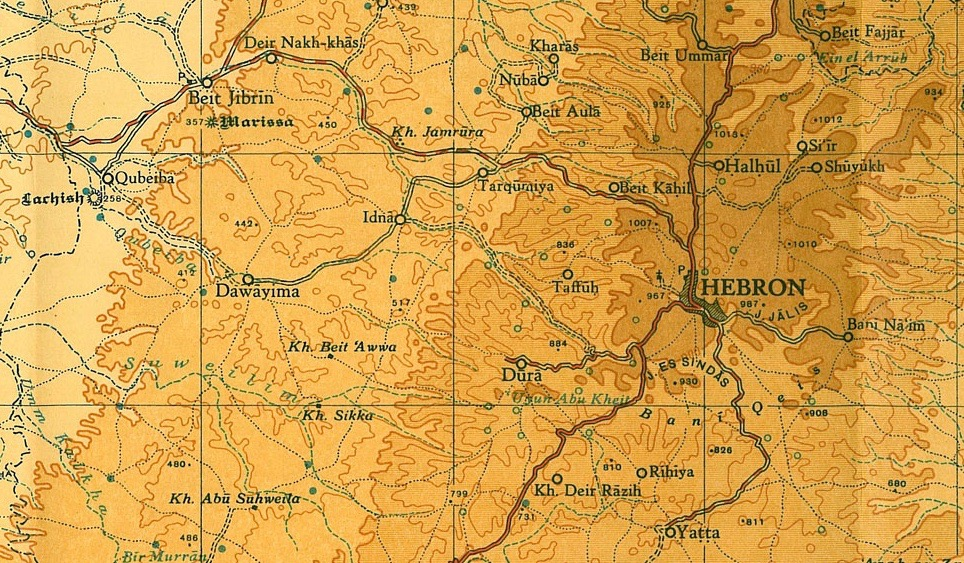
Tarqumiyah 1945 1:250,000

=== Jordan and Israel ===
In the wake of the 1948 Arab–Israeli War, and after the 1949 Armistice Agreements, Tarqumiyah came under Jordanian rule.In 1961, the population of Tarqumiyah was 2,651.

In 1967, it came under Israeli occupation. The population in the 1967 census conducted by the Israeli authorities was 2,412. Israel has expropriated land from Tarqumiyah in order to construct two Israeli settlements: Telem and Adora.

=== Palestinian Authority ===
Since 1995, Tarqumiyah has also been governed by the Palestinian National Authority as part of Area B of the West Bank. According to the Palestinian Central Bureau of Statistics, the town had a population of over 14,357 in 2007.

== Bibliography ==
- Barron, J.B., ed. (1923). Palestine: Report and General Abstracts of the Census of 1922. Government of Palestine.
- Dauphin, C. (1998). La Palestine byzantine, Peuplement et Populations. BAR International Series 726 (in French). Vol. III : Catalogue. Oxford: Archeopress. ISBN 0-860549-05-4.
- Conder, C.R.; Kitchener, H.H. (1883). The Survey of Western Palestine: Memoirs of the Topography, Orography, Hydrography, and Archaeology. Vol. 3. London: Committee of the Palestine Exploration Fund.
- Government of Jordan, Department of Statistics (1964). First Census of Population and Housing. Volume I: Final Tables; General Characteristics of the Population (PDF).
- Government of Palestine, Department of Statistics (1945). Village Statistics, April, 1945.
- Guérin, V. (1869). Description Géographique Historique et Archéologique de la Palestine (in French). Vol. 1: Judee, pt. 3. Paris: L'Imprimerie Nationale.
- Hadawi, S. (1970). Village Statistics of 1945: A Classification of Land and Area ownership in Palestine. Palestine Liberation Organization Research Center.
- Hartmann, M. (1883). "Die Ortschaftenliste des Liwa Jerusalem in dem türkischen Staatskalender für Syrien auf das Jahr 1288 der Flucht (1871)". Zeitschrift des Deutschen Palästina-Vereins. 6: 102–149.
- Hütteroth, W.-D.; Abdulfattah, K. (1977). Historical Geography of Palestine, Transjordan and Southern Syria in the Late 16th Century. Erlanger Geographische Arbeiten, Sonderband 5. Erlangen, Germany: Vorstand der Fränkischen Geographischen Gesellschaft. ISBN 3-920405-41-2.
- Mills, E., ed. (1932). Census of Palestine 1931. Population of Villages, Towns and Administrative Areas. Jerusalem: Government of Palestine.
- Palmer, E.H. (1881). The Survey of Western Palestine: Arabic and English Name Lists Collected During the Survey by Lieutenants Conder and Kitchener, R. E. Transliterated and Explained by E.H. Palmer. Committee of the Palestine Exploration Fund.
- Robinson, Edward; Smith, Eli (1841). Biblical Researches in Palestine, Mount Sinai and Arabia Petraea: A Journal of Travels in the year 1838. Vol. 2. Boston: Crocker & Brewster.
- Robinson, E.; Smith, E. (1841). Biblical Researches in Palestine, Mount Sinai and Arabia Petraea: A Journal of Travels in the year 1838. Vol. 3. Boston: Crocker & Brewster.
- Socin, A. (1879). "Alphabetisches Verzeichniss von Ortschaften des Paschalik Jerusalem". Zeitschrift des Deutschen Palästina-Vereins. 2: 135–163.
