= Macrinus (bishop of Eleutheropolis) =

Macrinus was a fourth-century bishop of Eleutheropolis in Judea and delegate to the First Council of Nicaea.

Very little is known of his early life, career or Episcopal work. He was appointed as the bishop of Eleutheropolis in 325 and later in 325 Macrinus attended the First Council of Nicaea as a delegate representing Judea.
