= Bayt Jibrin =

Depopulated Palestinian village and ancient Roman city in Israel near Hebron

Bayt Jibrin بيت جبرين Beit Jibrin originally Bayt Gibril
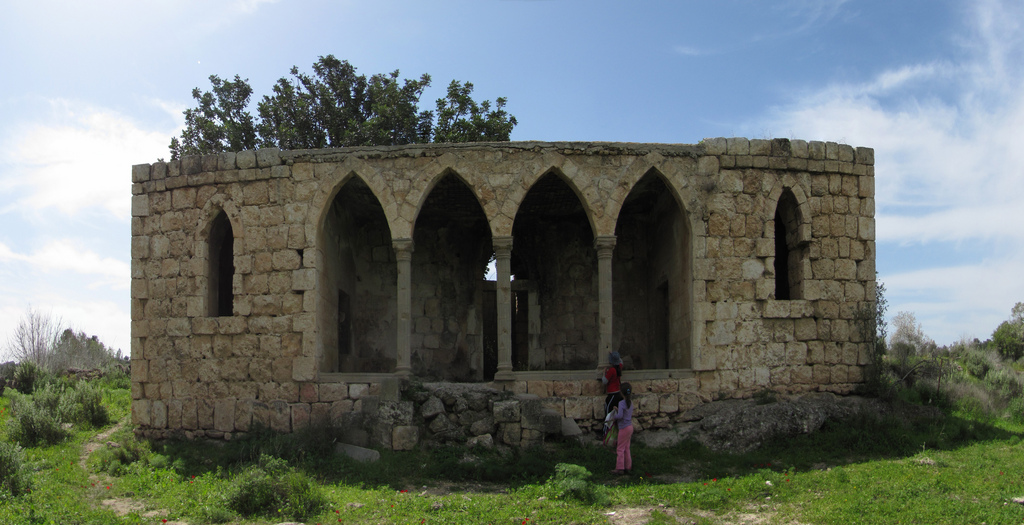
- Historic Bayt Jibrin mansion

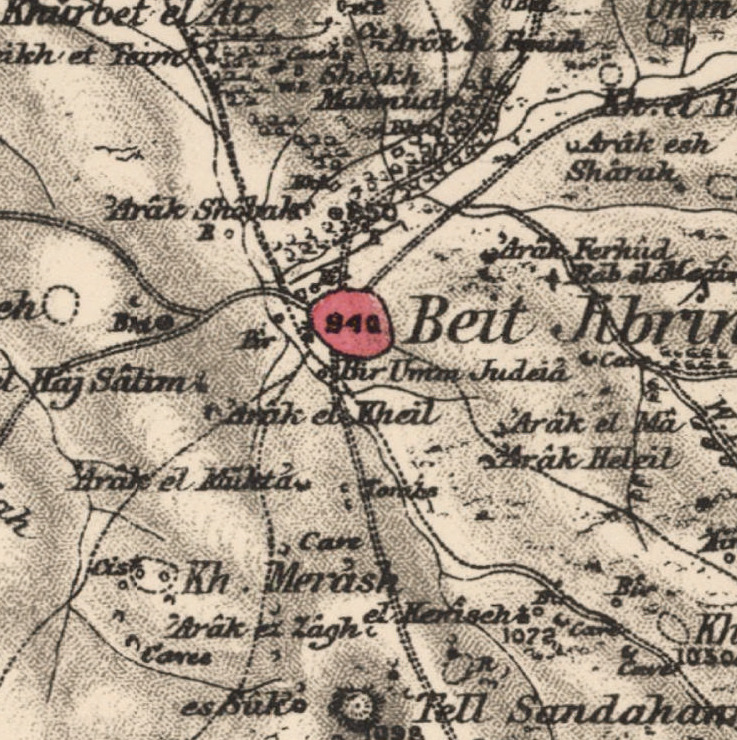
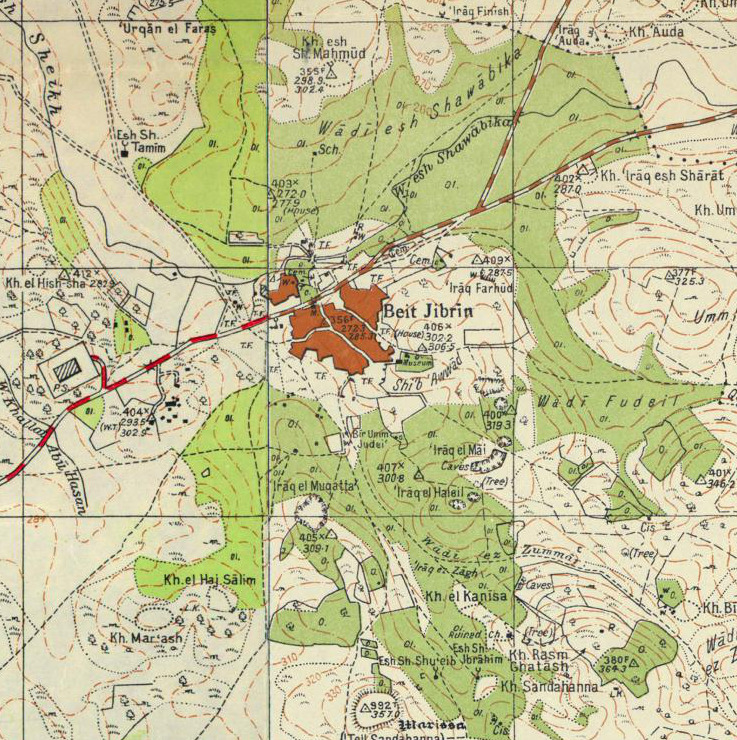
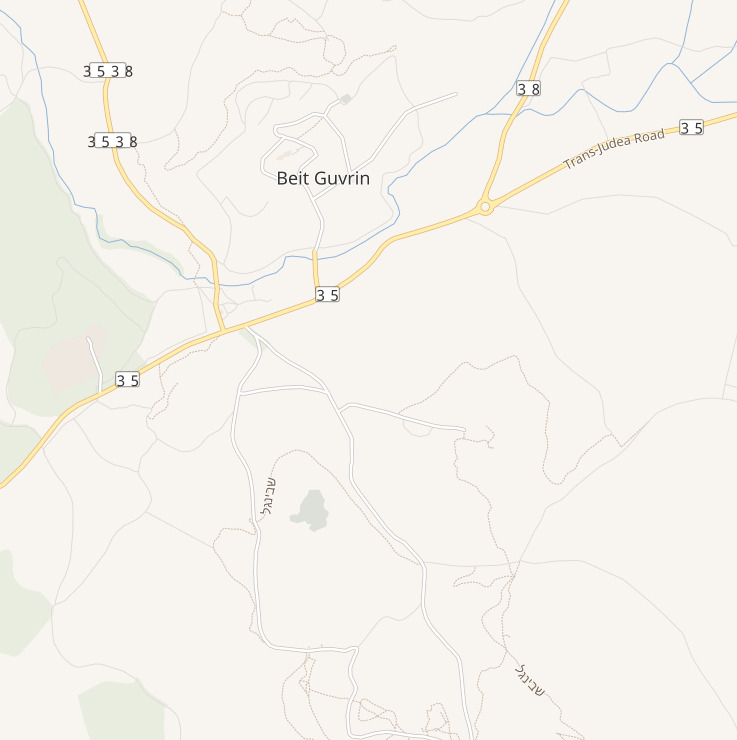
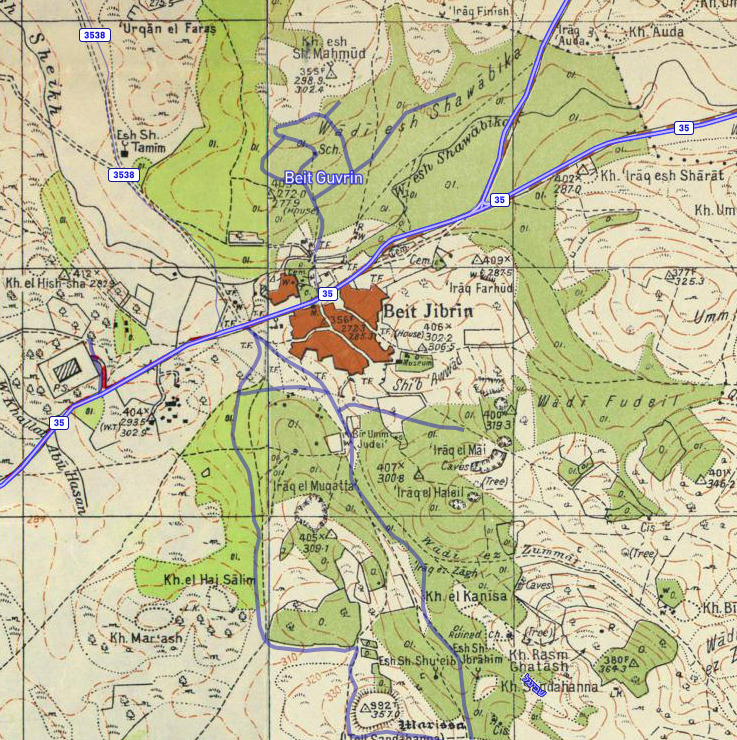
- 1870s map 1940s map modern map 1940s with modern overlay map A series of historical maps of the area around Bayt Jibrin (click the buttons)

- Location within Mandatory Palestine
- Coordinates: 31°36′19″N 34°53′54″E
- Palestine grid: 140/112
- Geopolitical entity: Mandatory Palestine
- Subdistrict: Hebron
- Date of depopulation: 29 October 1948

Area
  - Total: 56.2 km^{2} (21.7 sq mi)

Population (1945)
  - Total: 2,430
- Cause(s) of depopulation: Military assault by Yishuv forces
- Current Localities: Beit Guvrin (kibbutz)

Bayt Jibrin or Beit Jibrin (Arabic: بيت جبرين lit. 'House of the Powerful') was an Arab village in the Hebron Subdistrict of British Mandatory Palestine, in what is today the State of Israel, which was depopulated during the 1948 Arab–Israeli War. It was preceded by the Iron Age Judahite city of Maresha, the later Hellenistic Marissa, located slightly south of Beit Jibrin's built-up area; and the Roman and Byzantine city of Beth Gabra, known from the Talmud as Beit Guvrin (also Gubrin or Govrin, Hebrew: בית גוברין, romanized: Beit Gubrin), renamed Eleutheropolis (Greek, Ἐλευθερόπολις, "Free City") after 200 CE. After the 7th-century Arab conquest of the Levant, the Arabic name of Beit Jibrin was used for the first time, followed by the Crusaders' Bethgibelin, given to a Frankish colony established around a Hospitaller castle. After the Muslim reconquest the Arab village of Beit Jibrin was reestablished.

During the days of Herod the Great, Bet Gabra was the administrative center for the district of Idumea. In 200 CE, after the turmoil of the First Jewish–Roman War (64–70) and the Bar Kokhba revolt (132–135), the town became a thriving Roman colony, a major administrative centre and one of the most important cities in the Roman province of Syria Palaestina under the name of Eleutheropolis. The city was then inhabited by Jews, Christians and pagans. Under the British Mandate of Palestine, Bayt Jibrin again served as a district centre for surrounding villages. It was captured by Jewish forces during the 1948 war, causing its Arab inhabitants to flee eastward. Today, many of the Palestinian refugees of Bayt Jibrin and their descendants live in the camps of Bayt Jibrin (ʽAzza) and Fawwar in the southern West Bank.

The kibbutz of Beit Guvrin was established to the north of Bayt Jibrin, on the villages' lands, in 1949. The archaeological sites of Maresha and Beit Guvrin are today an Israeli national park known as the Beit Guvrin-Maresha National Park, including their burial caves and underground dwellings, workshops and quarries, which are listed as a UNESCO World Heritage Site. Eleutheropolis remains a titular see in the Roman Catholic Church.

== Location ==
The entire site is located in the Lakhish region of central Israel, between the coastal plain to the west and the Hebron Hills to the east, near the 1949 ceasefire line.

Ancient Maresha was identified at Tell Sandahanna, renamed Tel Maresha. The Hellenised city of Marissa included a lower city of 320 dunams during its heydays, which surrounded the tell (mound). It covers the southern part of the Beit Guvrin-Maresha archaeological park.

Bet Gabra or Betogabris grew around a hill c. 1.5 km north of Tel Maresha, after the demise of Marissa in 40 BCE.

The Crusader colony of Bethgibelin stood at what had been the northern margin of the classical city, with its castle built over the remains of the Roman amphitheatre. Its ruins now stand adjacent to and north of the regional road.

The built-up area of the modern Arab village of Beit Jibrin was largely south of the Crusader castle, adjacent to and mainly south of the regional road.

Kibbutz Beit Guvrin was built north of the Bethgibelin Castle and former Beit Jibrin.

== Geography ==
Historically, the site was located on the main road between Cairo and Hebron via Gaza, in an area of plains and soft hills known as the Shfela (Shephelah) in Hebrew. Beit Jibrin's average elevation was of 275 meters (902 ft) above sea level.

The region contains a large number of caverns, both natural formations and caves dug in the soft chalk by inhabitants of the region over the centuries for use as quarries, burial grounds, animal shelters, workshops and spaces for raising doves and pigeons. There is estimated to be 800 such caverns, many linked by an underground maze of passageways. Eighty of them, known as the Bell Caves, are located on the grounds of the Beit Guvrin National Park.

== Name ==
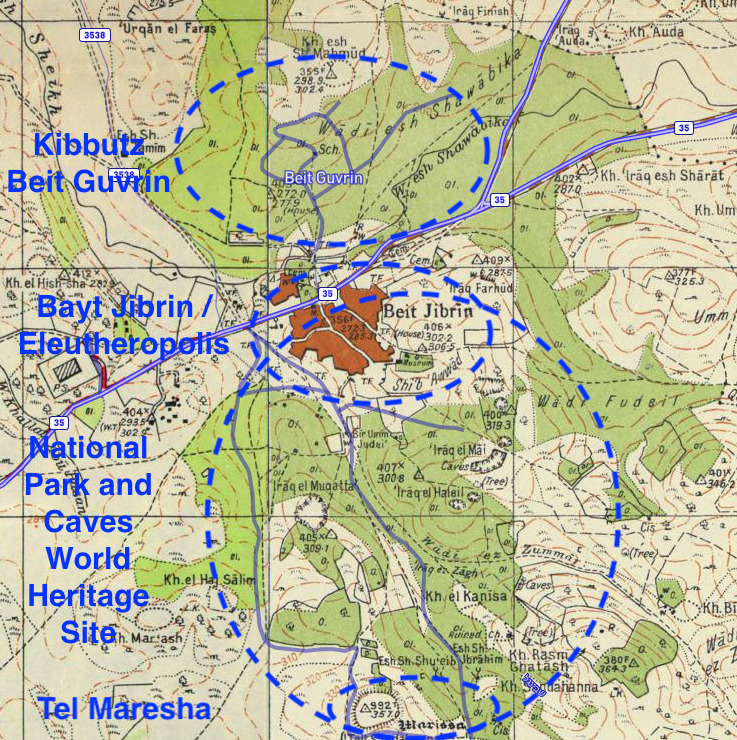
Map illustrating the locations of Kibbutz Beit Guvrin, historical Bayt Jibrin-Eleutheropolis, the ancient caves World Heritage Site, and Tel Maresha (1940s Survey of Palestine map with modern overlay)

The settlement was renamed over the centuries. The Aramaic name Beth Gabra, attested from at least the Early Roman period, was preserved by the geographer Ptolemy in the Greek variation of Βαιτογάβρα, Baitogabra, translates as the "house of the [strong] man" or "house of the mighty one". The antecedent might be seen in the name of an Edomite king: Ḳaus-gabri or Kauš-Gabr, found on an inscription of Tiglathpileser III.

According to historical geographer A. Schlatter, the name Betaris mentioned by Josephus should either be identified with Bittir, or else the 't' amended to gamma, so as to read Begabrin.

In the year 200 CE, Roman Emperor Septimius Severus gave it the status of a city under a new Greek name, Eleutheropolis (Ἐλευθερόπολις), meaning 'City of the Free', and its inhabitants were given the rank of Roman citizens under the laws of ius italicum. In the Peutinger Table in 393 CE, Bayt Jibrin was called Beitogabri. In the Talmud, compiled between the 3rd and 4th centuries, it was known as Beit Gubrin or Guvrin. To the Crusaders, it was known as Bethgibelin or Gibelin. Another name in medieval times may have been Beit Jibril, meaning "house of Gabriel". In Arabic, Bayt Jibrin or Jubrin (بيت جبرين) means "house of the powerful", reflecting its original Aramaic name, and the town was probably called Bayt Jibrin or Beit Jibril throughout its rule by various Muslim dynasties.

== History ==
=== Iron Age Maresha ===
The excavations have revealed no remains older than the Iron Age, a time when the Judahite town of Maresha rose on the tell to the south of Bay Jibrin known in Arabic as Tell Sandahanna and in Hebrew as Tel Maresha. This corresponds to several Hebrew Bible mentions of Maresha. However, local folklore tells that the former Arab village of Bayt Jibrin was first inhabited by Canaanites. After the destruction of the Kingdom of Judah in 586 BCE, the city of Maresha became part of the Edomite kingdom. In the late Persian period a Sidonian community settled in Maresha, and the city is mentioned three times in the Zenon Papyri (259 BCE). During the Maccabean Revolt, Maresha was a base for attacks against Judea and suffered retaliation from the Maccabees. In 112 BCE, Maresha was conquered and destroyed by the Hasmonean king, John Hyrcanus I, after which the region of Idumea (the Greek name of Edom) remained under Hasmonean control and Idumeans were forced to convert to Judaism. In 40 BCE, the Parthians devastated completely the "strong city", after which it was never rebuilt. After this date, nearby Beit Guvrin succeeded Maresha as the chief center of the area.

=== Roman and Byzantine periods ===
In the Jewish War (68 CE), Vespasian slaughtered or enslaved the inhabitants of Betaris. According to Josephus: "When he had seized upon two villages, which were in the very midst of Idumea, Betaris [sic] (corrected to read Begabris), and Caphartobas, he slew above ten thousand of the people, and carried into captivity above a thousand, and drove away the rest of the multitude, and placed no small part of his own forces in them, who overran and laid waste the whole mountainous country." However, it continued to be a Jewish-inhabited city until the Bar Kokhba revolt (132–135 CE).

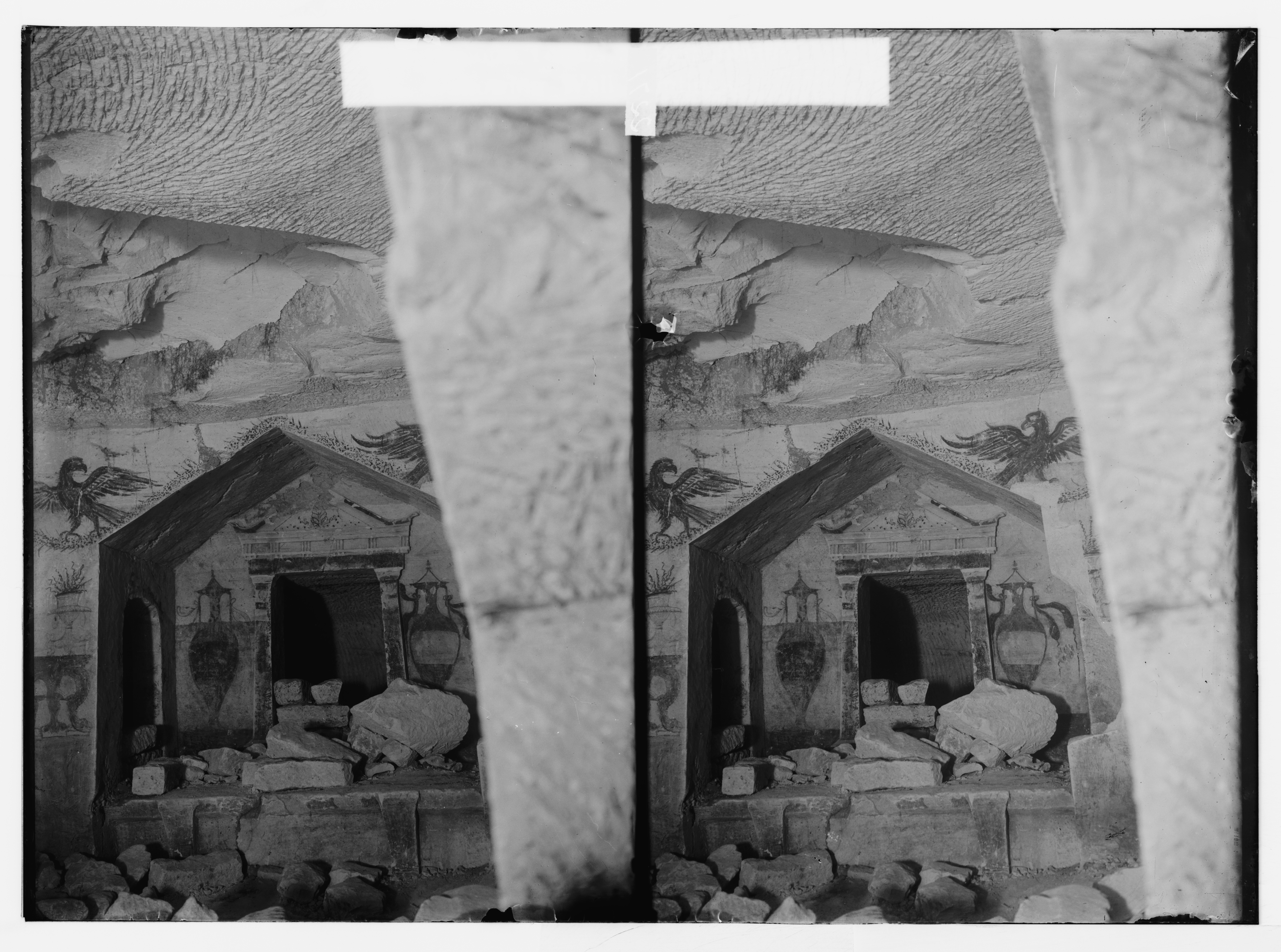
'Sidonian' tombs unearthed at Beit Jibrin

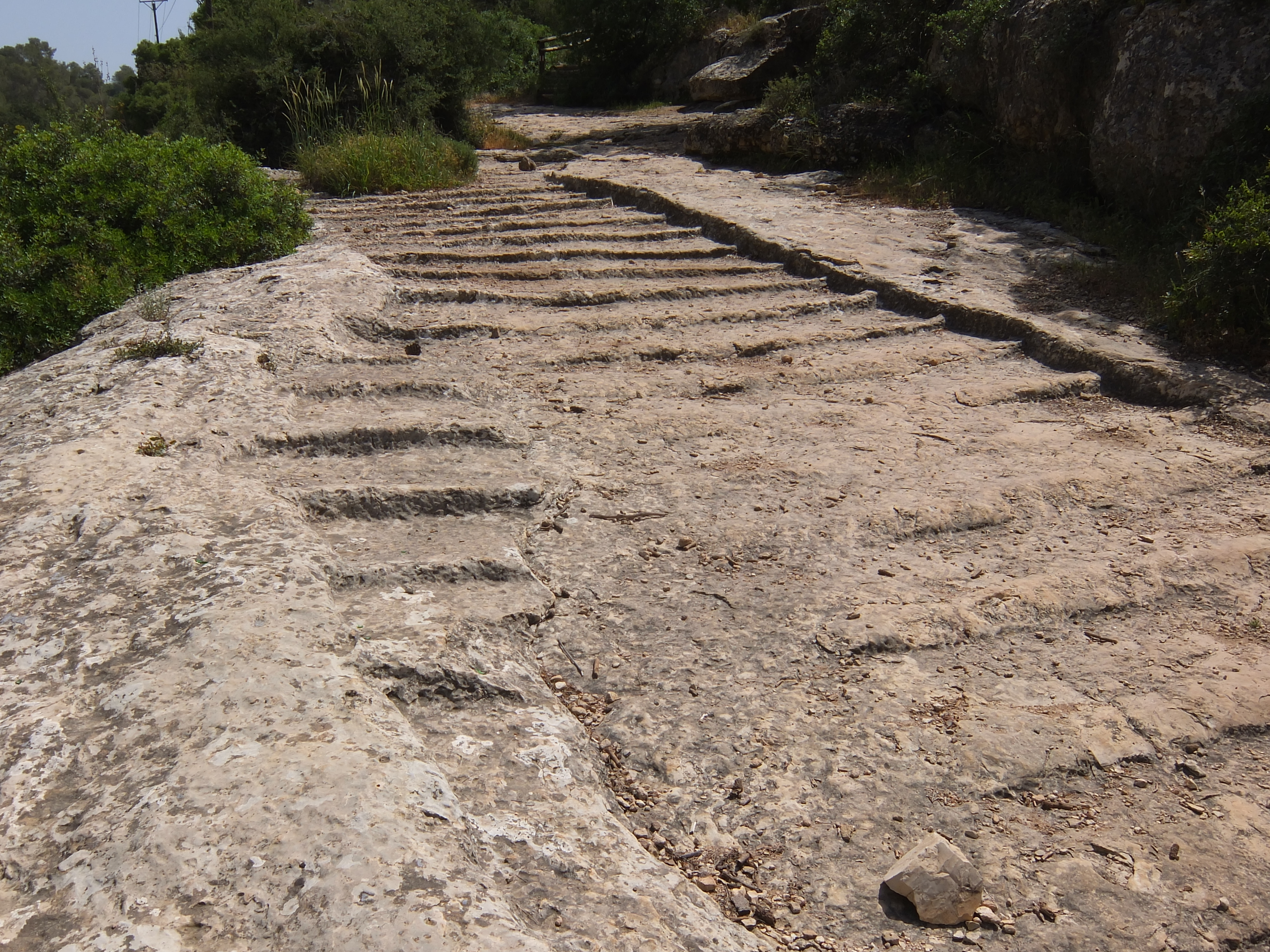
Old Roman Road, leading from Jerusalem to Beit Gubrin, adjacent to regional hwy 375 in Israel

Septimius Severus, Roman Emperor from 193 to 211, granted the city municipal status, under a new Greek name, Eleutheropolis, meaning "City of the Free", and giving its citizens the ius italicum and exempting them from taxes. Coins minted by him, bearing the date 1 January 200, commemorate its founding and the title of polis. Eleutheropolis, which covered an area of 65 hectares (160 acres) (larger at the time than Aelia Capitolina – the Roman city built over the ruins of Jewish Jerusalem), flourished under the Romans, who built public buildings, military installations, aqueducts and a large amphitheater. Towards the end of the 2nd century CE, Rabbi Judah the Prince ameliorated the condition of its Jewish citizens by releasing the city from the obligations of tithing home-grown produce, and from observing the Seventh Year laws with respect to the same produce, as believing this area of the country was not originally settled by Jews returning from the Babylonian captivity. The vita of Epiphanius of Salamis, born into a Christian family near Eleutheropolis, describes the general surroundings in Late Antique Judaea. The second chapter of the vita describes the details of the important market of Eleutheropolis. Seven routes met at Eleutheropolis, and Eusebius, in his Onomasticon, uses the Roman milestones indicating the city as a central point from which the distances of other towns were measured. The Madaba Map (dated 542–570 CE) shows Eleutheropolis as a walled city with three towers, a curving street with a colonnade in the central part and an important basilica. In the centre is a building with a yellowish-white dome on four columns. Eleutheropolis was last mentioned in the ancient sources by the near contemporary itinerarium of the Piacenza Pilgrim, about 570.

In the 1st and 2nd centuries CE, Christianity penetrated the city due to its location on the route between Jerusalem and Gaza. The city's first bishop, Justus, was one of the 70 Disciples. Eleutheropolis was a "City of Excellence" in the fourth century and a Christian bishopric with the largest territory in Palaestina. In 325 CE, Eleutheropolis was the seat of Bishop Macrinus, who in that year attended the First Council of Nicaea. Epiphanius of Salamis, Bishop of Salamis in Cyprus, was born at Eleutheropolis; at Ad nearby he established a monastery which is often mentioned in the polemics of Jerome with Rufinus and John, Bishop of Jerusalem. Epiphanius also mentions that Akouas, a disciple of Mani, had been the first to spread Manichaeism in Eleutheropolis and the rest of Palestine during the reign of Aurelian (270–275 AD).

Beit Guvrin is mentioned in the Talmud in the 3rd and 4th centuries, indicating a revival of the Jewish community around that time. The tanna Judah b. Jacob and the amora Jonathan (referred to in the Talmud as "Yonatan me-Bet Guvrin" or Jonathan of Bet Guvrin) were residents of the city. The Talmudic region known as Darom was within the area of Eleutheropolis ("Beit Guvrin"), later known by its Arabic corruption ad-Dārūm. Excavations at Eleutheropolis show a prosperous city, and confirm the presence of Jews and Christians in the area. It was described as one of Palestine's five "Cities of Excellence" by 4th-century Roman historian Ammianus Marcellinus. During the Roman-Byzantine era, water was brought into Beit Gubrin (Bayt Jibrin) via an aqueduct that passed through Wādi el-ʻUnqur, a watercourse that originates from a natural spring to the south-west of Hebron, and running in a north-westerly direction, bypassing Idhna on the north, for a total distance of about 25 kilometres (16 mi). Remnants of the aqueduct are still extant. The territory under the administration of Eleutheropolis encompassed most of Idumea, with the districts of Bethletepha, western Edom and Hebron up to Ein Gedi, and included over 100 villages.

Bayt Jibrin is mentioned in the Talmud (redacted 5th–6th century CE) under the name Beit Gubrin. In the Peutinger Tables (393 CE), the place is called Beto Gabra, and shown as 16 Roman miles from Ascalon. The true distance is 20 English miles.

The Midrash Rabba (Genesis Rabba, section 67) mentions Beit Gubrin in relation to Esau and his descendants (Idumaeans) who settled the region, and which region was renowned for its fertile ground and productivity.

=== Early Islamic period ===
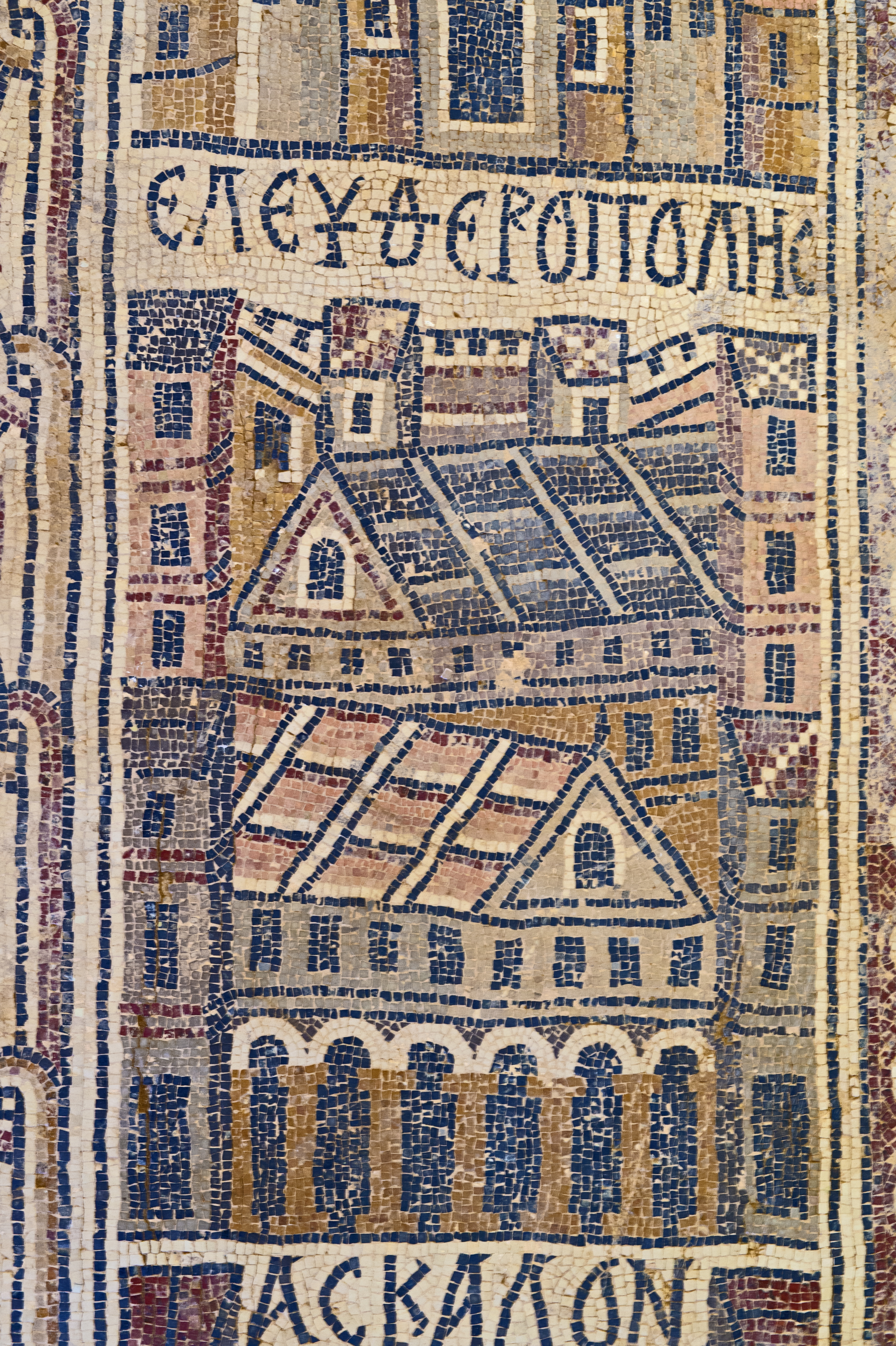
Eleutheropolis as one of the town mosaics in the church of St. Stephen in Um er-Rasas, Jordan. Year 785.

The 9th-century historian al-Baladhuri mentions Bayt Jibrin (the Arabicized form of the original Semitic place name used following the Muslim conquest) as one of ten towns in Jund Filastin (military district of Palestine) conquered by Amr ibn al-As in the mid-630s'. Amr enclosed a domain to Bayt Jibrin, which he named Ajlan, after one of his freemen.

The Bishop of Bayt Jibrin was Tamim al-Dari, a member of the Palestinian Christian Lakhmid tribe. His nisba, al-Daīri, comes from "monastery" (Dair/Dayr/Deir), alluding to his Christian background. He eventually became a Companion of the Prophet Muhammad, advising him on many issues regarding the Christians of Syria and is credited with introducing the use of oil lamps, ubiquitous in local worship, into Islamic worship practices. The 1904 Analecta Bollandiana recounts that in 638 the Muslim army beheaded fifty soldiers in Bayt Jibrin from the Byzantine garrison of Gaza who refused to abandon Christianity and who were then buried in a church built in their honor.

In the beginning of the power struggle between Ali and Mu'awiya for the position of caliph, Amr left Medina in the Hejaz and took up residence at his estate called Ajlan in Bayt Jibrin with his sons Muhammad and Abdallah. The latter died there. The Umayyad prince and governor of Palestine, Sulayman ibn Abd al-Malik, received the news of his becoming caliph in 715 during his stay in Bayt Jibrin.

In 750 Palestine came under Abbasid rule. Bayt Jibrin may have already been devastated in 788, but in any event, in 796, it was destroyed by Bedouin tribesmen in an effort to combat Christian influence in the region during a civil war between the Arab tribal federations of the area. According to a monk named Stephen, "it was laid waste, and its inhabitants carried off into captivity". However, by 985, Bayt Jibrin seemed to have recovered, judging by the writings of the Jerusalemite geographer al-Muqaddasi:

"[Bayt Jibrin] is a city partly in the hill country, partly in the plain. Its territory has the name of Ad Darum (the ancient Daroma and the modern Dairan), and there are here marble [sic] quarries. The district sends its produce to the capital (Ar Ramlah). It is an emporium for the neighbouring country, and a land of riches and plenty, possessing fine domains. The population, however, is now on the decrease...."

There is no marble quarry anywhere in Israel/Palestine, but al-Muqaddasi probably referred to the underground chalkstone quarries known today as "bell caves". Surface nari (local name for caliche) is harder than chalk.

=== Crusader and Mamluk eras ===
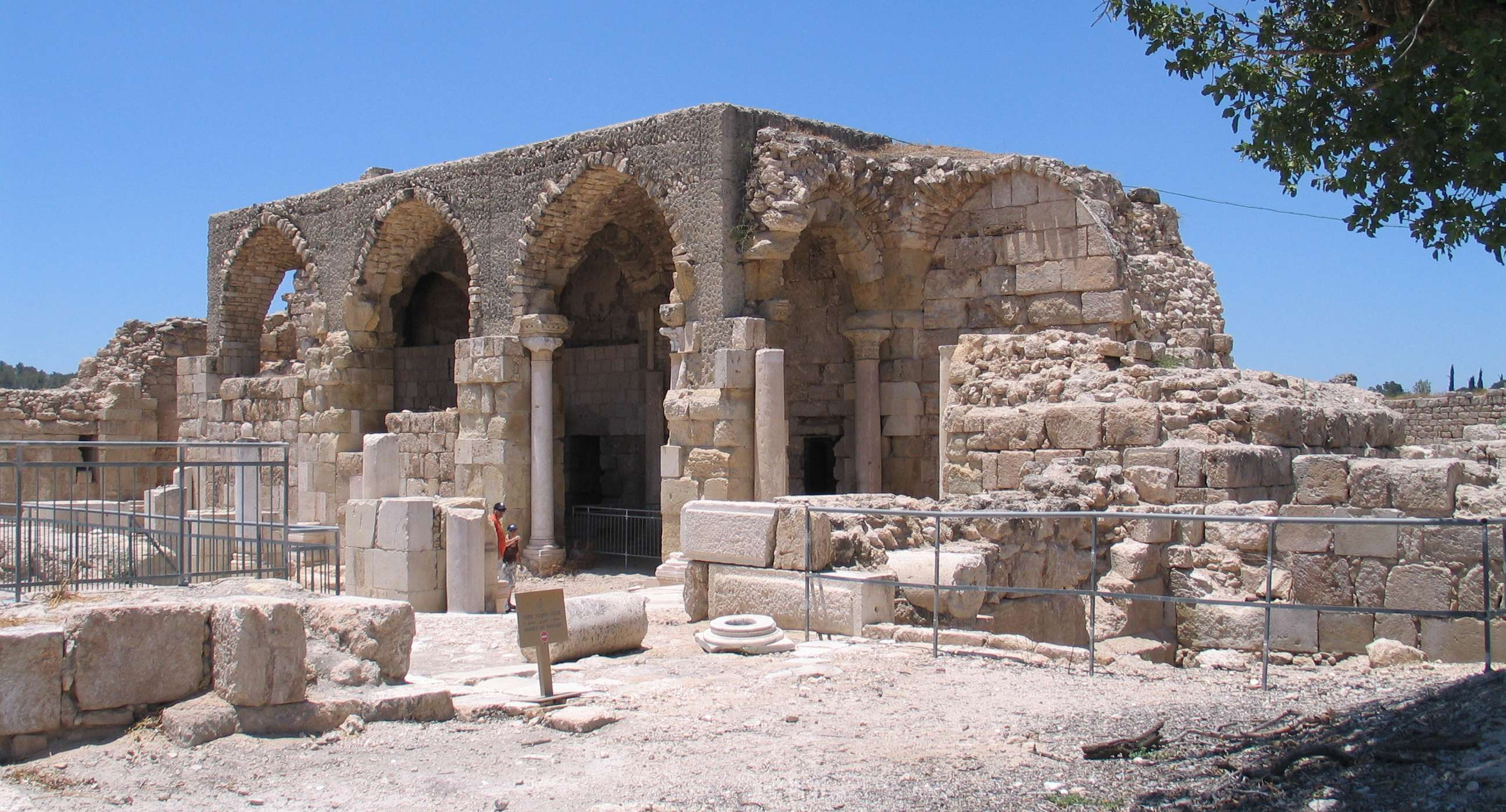
Remains of the Crusader church in Bayt Jibrin, 2009

In 1099, Crusaders invaded Palestine and established the Kingdom of Jerusalem. In 1135, King Fulk of Jerusalem erected a castle on the lands of Bayt Jibrin, the first of a series of Crusader fortifications built at this time to ensure control over the ports of Caesarea and Jaffa. In 1136, King Fulk donated the castle to the Knights Hospitallers. In 1168, the Hospitallers were granted a charter to establish a Frankish colony, which they named "Bethgibelin". Christian settlers in Beit Jibrin were promised a share of property looted from the Muslims. It was on the itinerary of Benjamin of Tudela, who found three Jews living there when he visited the country. The Ayyubid army under Saladin sacked Bethgibelin in 1187, after most of the Kingdom of Jerusalem came under Muslim control as a consequence of his victory at the Battle of Hittin. Soon after its capture Saladin ordered the demolition of the Crusader castle. From 1191 to 1192, the town was held in probate by Henry of Champagne, as lord of the Kingdom of Jerusalem, while Saladin and Richard the Lionheart negotiated a ceasefire.

However, the Crusaders remained in control of Bethgibelin until 1244, when the Ayyubids reconquered it under Sultan as-Salih Ayyub. By 1283, the Mamluks had taken control and it was listed as a domain of Sultan Qalawun. The city prospered under the Egypt-based Mamluk Sultanate and served as a postal station. During Mamluk rule, Bayt Jibrin administratively belonged to Hebron and was under the jurisdiction of the Shafi'i (a school of law in Sunni Islam) qadi (head judge) of that city.

=== Ottoman rule and the 'Azza family ===
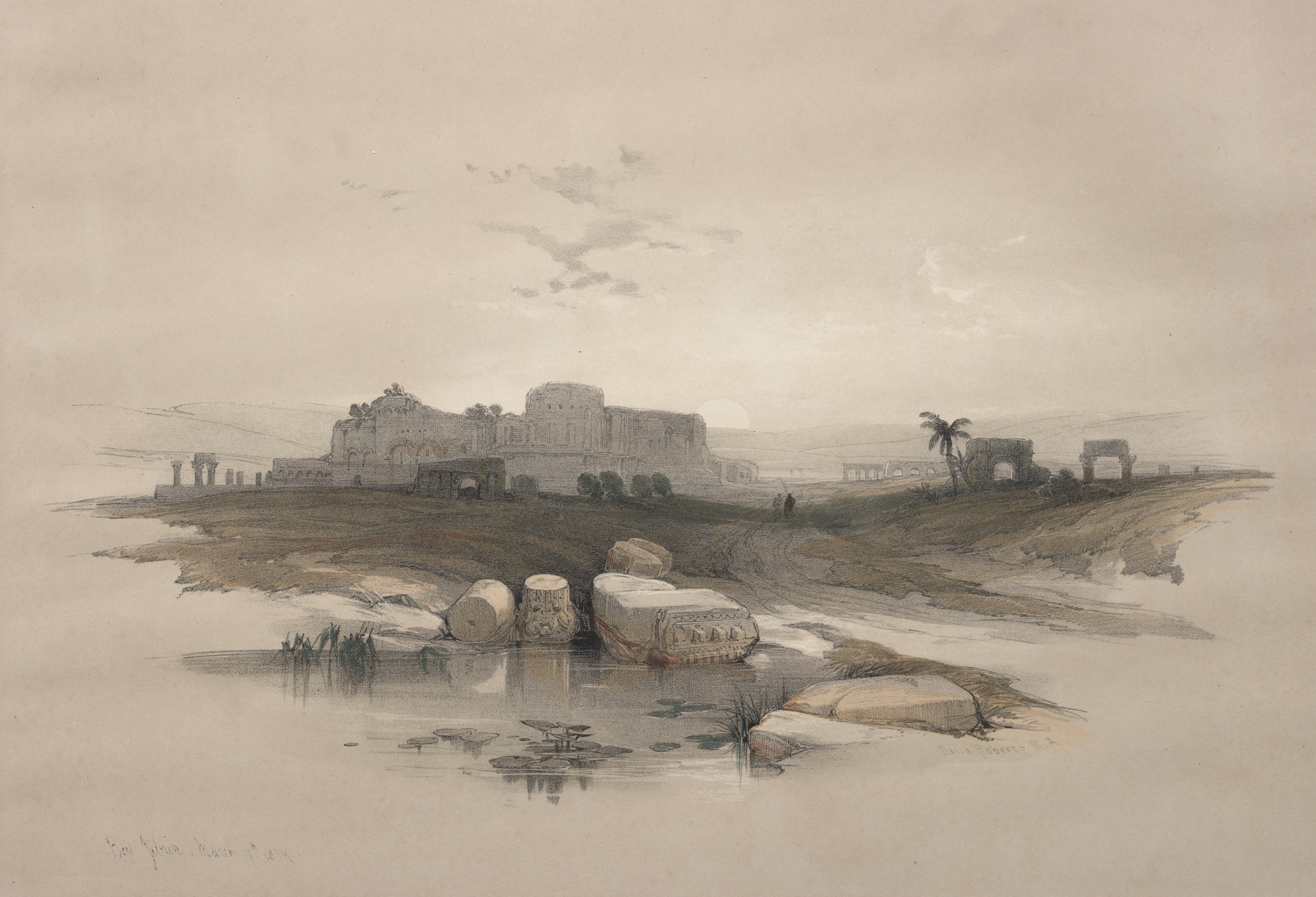
Bayt Jibrin in 1839, in David Roberts' The Holy Land, Syria, Idumea, Arabia, Egypt, and Nubia.

Bayt Jibrin and all of Palestine was conquered by the Ottomans after their victory over the Mamluks during the 1516 Battle of Marj Dabiq. Bayt Jibrin subsequently became part of the nahiya (subdistrict) of Hebron (al-Khalīl), which was part of the sanjak ("district") of Gaza. An Ottoman fiscal source from c. 1525–1528 mentions Beit Jibrin as one of the villages whose peasants had deserted.

The Ottomans did not exercise strict control over their territories and tended to keep local leaders in their traditional positions as long as they complied with the higher authorities and paid imperial taxes.

During Suleiman the Magnificent's reign, in 1552, the destroyed Crusader castle in Bayt Jibrin was partially rebuilt in order to protect the main road between Gaza and Jerusalem. In 1596, the inhabitants of Bayt Jibrin, consisting of 50 Muslim families, paid taxes on wheat, barley and sesame seeds, as well as goats and beehives.

In the 17th century, Bayt Jibrin may have absorbed residents from Khursa, whose village had been destroyed in an attack by the people of Dura.

In the 19th century, Bayt Jibrin was the seat of the 'Azza family, who had ruled the area since migrating to Palestine from Egypt. In the 1840s, after the Ottomans attempted to crush local leaders in the Hebron Hills for their refusal to pay taxes, the 'Azza family joined a revolt against Ottoman rule. They had aligned themselves to the 'Amr clan of the Hebron-area village of Dura. Between 1840 and 1846, hostilities were raging between the Qays and Yaman tribo-political factions in southern Palestine. The 'Azza and 'Amr families, part of the Qays confederation, were constantly clashing with the Yaman-aligned Abu Ghosh clan, who were based in the vicinity of Jerusalem. In 1846, the shaykh (chief) of Bayt Jibrin, Muslih al-'Azza (known as the "giant of Bayt Jibrin"), the leader of the 'Amr clan, and other local leaders were exiled, but were allowed to return in the early 1850s.

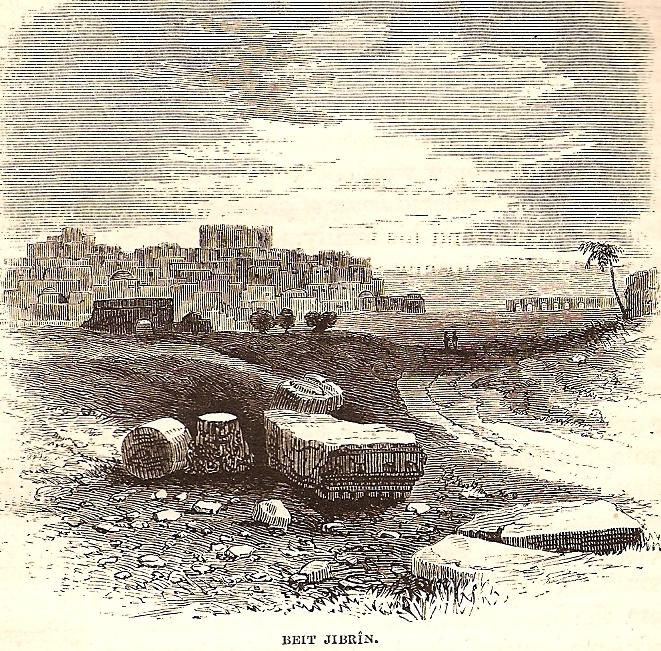
A sketch painting of Bayt Jibrin in 1859 by W.M. Thomson

In 1855, the newly appointed Ottoman pasha ("governor") of the sanjak ("district") of Jerusalem, Kamil Pasha, attempted to subdue the rebellion in the Hebron region. Kamil Pasha marched towards Hebron with his army in July 1855, and after crushing the opposition, he ordered the local shaykhs to summon to his camp. Several of the shaykhs, including the leader of the 'Amr clan and Muslih al-'Azza, did not obey the summons. Kamil Pasha then requested that the British consul in Jerusalem, James Finn, serve as an envoy and arrange a meeting with Muslih. Finn sent his vice-consul to assure Muslih of his safety in Hebron and convinced him to meet with Kamil Pasha. Muslih was well received in Hebron and returned to Bayt Jibrin escorted by twenty of the governor's men. Soon after, the Kamil Pasha paid a visit to Bayt Jibrin to settle affairs and collect the town's overdue taxes. Kamil Pasha took an oath of loyalty from all the local shaykhs in the Hebron region, including those under the rule of Muslih al-'Azza.

In 1838, American archeologist Edward Robinson identified Bayt Jibrin as the site of both ancient Eleutheropolis and ancient Bethgebrim. He cited William of Tyre's reference to the Arabic name. Later travelers who visited Bayt Jibrin during that time were very impressed both by the shaykh of Bayt Jibrin, as well as by his "castle" or "manor". At the time, the remains of the Crusader fortress still served for defensive purposes in the village. According to Bayt Jibrin's shaykh, in 1863, he was in command of 16 villages in the area and pledged "to provide as many as 2,000 men to the government if necessary." In 1864, however, Muslih's brother told a traveler that Muslih and his property had been seized on "false charges of treason," and that he had been banished to Cyprus and then beheaded.

Socin found from an official Ottoman village list from about 1870 that Bayt Jibrin had a population of 508, with a total of 147 houses, though the population count included men, only.

Bayt Jibrin's status began to decline throughout the 19th century. According to Western travelers it was "a small and insignificant village". The primary factors that contributed to the decline were the Bedouin raids on Bayt Jibrin's countryside villages, the 'Azza revolt, tribal warfare among the inhabitants of the towns and villages throughout Palestine and epidemics which struck the town and the nearby area.

In 1896 the population of Bet dschibrin was estimated to be about 1,278 persons.

=== British Mandate ===
The British Army, primarily under the command of General Edmund Allenby, defeated the Ottoman Empire in a series of successful operations in the Middle East, in World War I.

Beit Jibrin stood 21 kilometers (13 mi) northwest of Hebron, the district capital during Mandate times.

Bayt Jibrin resumed its role as an important town in the District of Hebron. The population was entirely Muslim, and had two schools, a medical clinic, a bus and a police station. The town's inhabitants cultivated grain and fruit, and residents from nearby towns flocked to its weekly market or souk. During the winter of 1920–1921 there was a severe outbreak of malaria. 157 villagers (one-sixth of the population) died with the mortality rate in the district reaching 68 per 1,000. Crops remained unharvested due to lack of people strong enough to work in the fields. The British authorities began a program of sealing open wells, improving drainage and distributing quinine across Palestine. In the 1922 census of Palestine conducted by the British Mandate authorities, Bayt Jibrin had a population of 1,420, all Muslim, increasing the 1931 census to 1,804, still all Muslim, in a total of 369 houses.

During the Palestinian Arab revolt of 1936–1939, British Archaeologist J. L. Starkey, was killed by a group of armed Arabs on the track leading from Bayt Jibrin to Hebron. In 2026, Roy Marom and Yosef Garfinkel attributed the assassination to rebel commander ʿIsa al-Battat and suggested that Sheikh ʿAbd al-Raḥmān al-ʿAzza had mediated between Battat and aggrieved landowners from al-Qubayba. Battat was killed several months later in Bayt Jibrin due to conflict with the al-ʿAzza family. In 1948, Battat’s son and his brother assassinated ʿAbd al-Raḥmān al-ʿAzza in blood revenge.

In the 1945 statistics, Bayt Jibrin had 2,430 Muslim inhabitants, with a total of 56,185 dunams or 56.1 km^{2} (13,900 acres) of land. Of this, 2,477 dunams were irrigated or used for plantations, 31,616 dunams used for cereals, while 287 dunams (0.28 km^{2} (69 acres)) were built-up (urban) areas. 98% of which was Arab-owned. The town's urban area consisted of 287 m^{2} (0.071 acres), with 33.2 km^{2} (8,200 acres) of cultivable land and 21.6 km^{2} (5,300 acres) of non-cultivable land. 54.8% of the town's land was planted with cereal crops, 6.2% with olives and 4.4% with irrigated crops.

Bayt Jibrin was in the territory allotted to the Arab state under the 1947 UN Partition Plan.

=== 1948 war ===
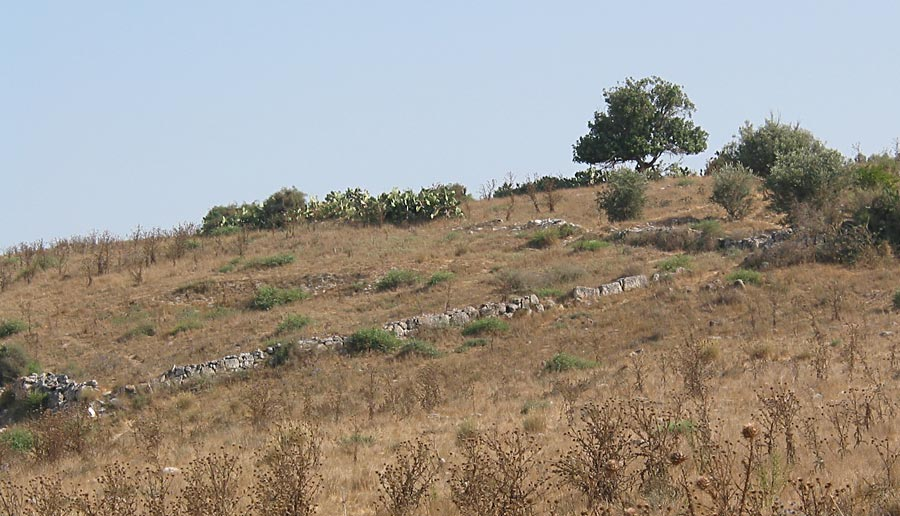
The ruins of Bayt Jibrin, 2005

The First Battalion of the Egyptian Army were ordered to take up position in Bayt Jibrin during the second half of May during the 1948 Arab–Israeli War. At the same time, The New York Times correspondent reported that thousands of Jaffa's inhabitants had fled inland, including "large numbers" to the Bayt Jibrin area. In October 1948, the Israel Defense Forces (IDF) launched Operation Yoav, which differed from operations three months earlier, as the IDF was now equipped with aircraft, artillery, and tanks. On October 15–16, the IDF launched bombing and strafing attacks on a number of towns and villages, including Bayt Jibrin. According to Morris, the towns caught in the fighting were neither psychologically nor defensively prepared for aerial strikes, and Israeli Air Force bombing of Bayt Jibrin on October 19 set off a "panic flight" of residents from the town.

On October 23, a United Nations-imposed ceasefire went into effect, however, there was an IDF raid on the neighboring police fort on the night of October 24, which resulted in more villagers fleeing Bayt Jibrin. Israeli troops from the Giv'ati Brigade then occupied Bayt Jibrin and its police fort on October 27. In 2008, a former resident of the town who was eight months old at the time of the raid, described his family's ordeal as follows:

In the 1948 war, the village was attacked by Israeli military units and bombed by Israeli aircraft. By that time, Beit Jibreen already hosted many refugees from neighboring villages. The fighting and bombing frightened the people. They escaped the fighting and sought shelter in the surrounding hills. [My] family found protection in a cave 5 km east of the village. They had left everything in their home, hoping to return after a few days when the attack would be over. The Israelis, however, did not allow them to return. Several men of Beit Jibreen were killed when they tried to go back.

The village was located near the 1949 ceasefire line.

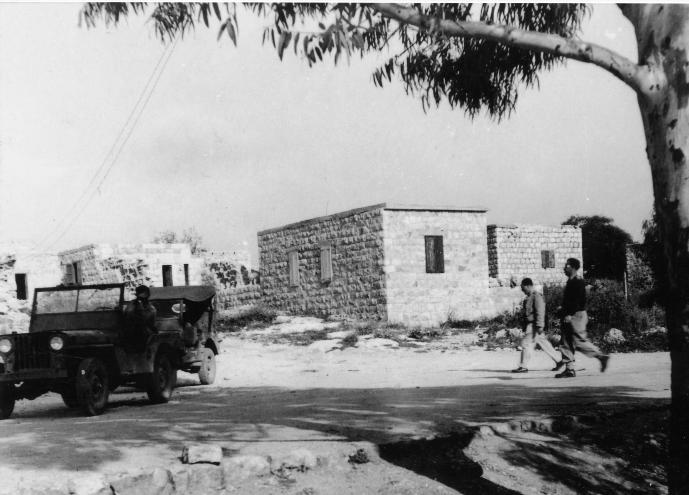
Bayt Jibrin after occupation by Harel Brigade, 1948

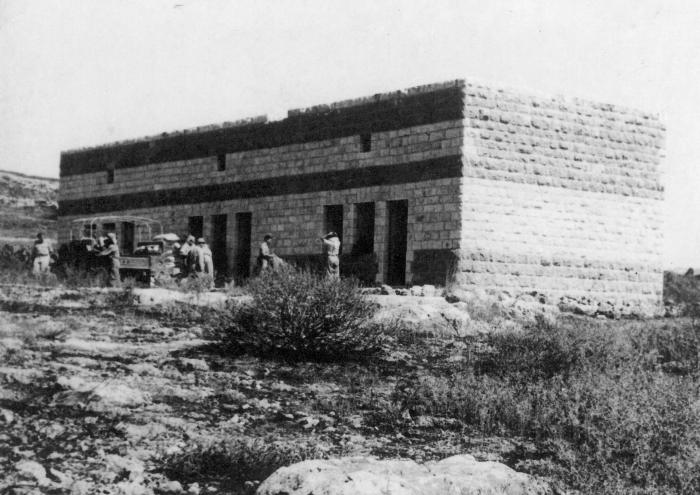
Building on outskirts of Bayt Jibrin, 1948

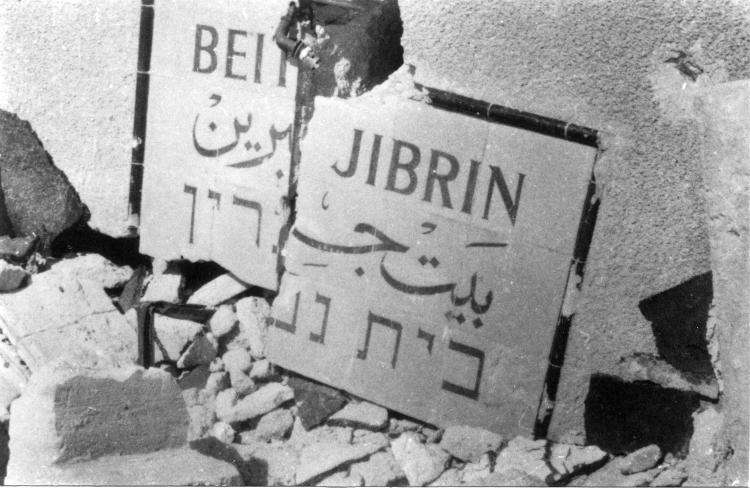
Beit Jibrin police station. 1948

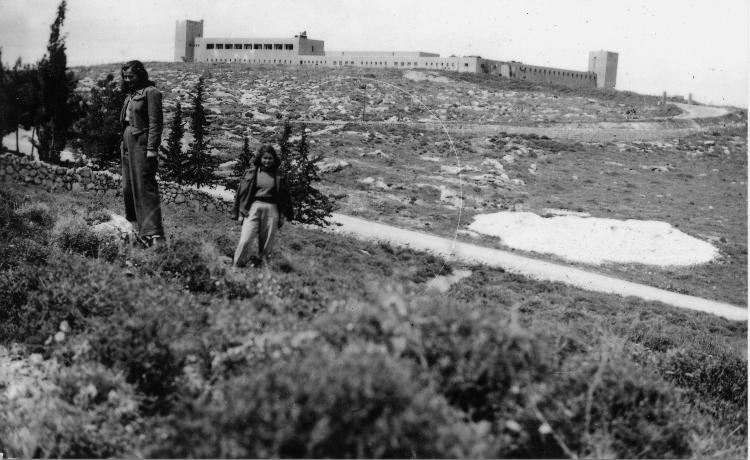
Beit Guvrin Police station. 1948

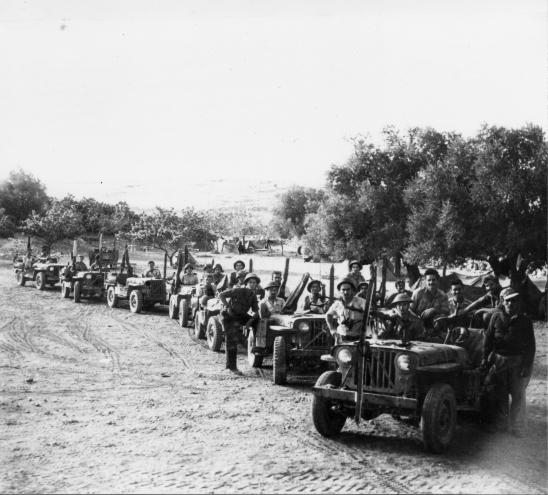
Members of the 89th Battalion outside Beit Gurvin, during Operation Yoav, October 1948

=== State of Israel ===
In 1949, kibbutz Beit Guvrin, was founded on the former village's lands. The excavated areas of the successive Judahite, Hellenistic, Roman-Byzantine and Crusader towns have been included in the Beit Guvrin National Park with major points of attraction for tourists. There is little focus on any traces of Arab presence within the park, the period from the 7th century onward receiving little attention.

== Archaeology ==
Today many of the excavated areas of Maresha and Beit Guvrin can be visited as part of the Israeli Beit Guvrin-Maresha National Park. Furthermore, the Archaeological Seminars Institute, under the license of the Israel Antiquities Authority, conducts excavations of Maresha's many quarried systems, and invites visitors to participate.

In 1838, the American Bible scholar Edward Robinson visited Bayt Jibrin, and identified it as ancient Eleutheropolis. The remains of the city of Maresha on Tell Sandahanna/Tel Maresha were first excavated in 1898-1900 by Bliss and Macalister, who uncovered a planned and fortified Hellenistic city encircled by a town wall with towers. Two Hellenistic and one Israelite stratum were identified by them on the mound. Between 1989 and 2000, large-scale excavations were held by the Israel Antiquities Authority (IAA) under the direction of Prof. Amos Kloner and conducted mainly in the Lower City of Maresha, concentrating both on the surface and on the subterranean complexes. Excavations continued in several subterranean complexes between 2001 and 2008.

The largely preserved remains of the amphitheater built by the Romans were excavated by Kloner. Among other unique finds was a Roman bath that has been confirmed to be the largest in Israel and the Palestinian territories. Many of the ancient city's olive presses, columbaria and water cisterns can still be seen. Less than 10 percent of the caves on Tel Maresha have been excavated.

The ruins of three Byzantine-era churches are located in Bayt Jibrin. A church on a northern hill of the town, later used as a private residence, had elaborate mosaics depicting the four seasons which were defaced in the 1948 Arab-Israeli War. A church south of the town, known as Khirbet Sandahanna, was dedicated to Saint Anne. The New Testament does not give any information about the mother of the Virgin Mary, but the widely circulated apocryphal Gospel of James gives her name as Anne, and her birthplace as Bethlehem. In another Christian tradition though, Bayt Jibrin is the birthplace of Saint Anne. The initial Byzantine church was rebuilt by Crusaders in the 12th century. Today, the apse with its three arched windows and half-dome ceiling are still intact.

The wider area of the Shfela has been inhabited for much longer. Excavations were conducted by the Israel Antiquities Authority (IAA) about 12 kilometres northeast from Bayt Jibrin at a site located on the same wadi, Nahal Guvrin, near moshav Menuha. The IAA has unearthed there artifacts from a village believed to be 6,500 years old, placing it at the end of the Stone Age or at the beginning of the Chalcolithic or "copper-and-stone age". The finds include pottery vessels and stone tools, among them flint sickle blades, cultic objects, clay figurines of horned animals, ceramic spindle whorls and animal bones belonging to pigs, goats, sheep and larger herbivores. The inhabitants probably chose this area due to the arable land and copious springs flowing even in the rainless summer months. Archaeologists believe the villagers grew grain, as indicated by the sickle blades and the grinding and pounding tools, and raised animals that supplied milk, meat and wool, as attested to by the spindle whorls. The settlement was small in scope, approximately 1.5 dunams, but there is evidence of bartering, based on the presence of basalt vessels and other lithic objects brought to the site from afar.

== Demographics ==
During the Roman period, Bayt Jibrin had a mixed population of Jews, Christians and pagans. Under Muslim rule, Islam gradually became the dominant religion and by the 20th century, the entire population was Muslim.

In Ottoman tax records from 1596, the town had a population of 275 inhabitants. In the late 19th century its population reached 900, while in 1896 the population was estimated to be about 1,278 persons. In 1912 it was estimated to be about 1,000, and to 1,420 in the next decade. According to the 1931 census of Palestine, Bayt Jibrin's population was 1,804. A 1945 land and population survey by Sami Hadawi reported a sharp increase to 2,430. The general growth pattern over every 9–11 years from 1912 to 1945 was around 400–500. In 1948, the projected population was 2,819.

The number of refugees from Bayt Jibrin, including their descendants, was estimated to be 17,310 in 1998. Many live in the al-'Azza (also called Bayt Jibrin) and Fawwar camps in the southern West Bank.

== Beit Jibrin: culture ==
=== Embroidery ===
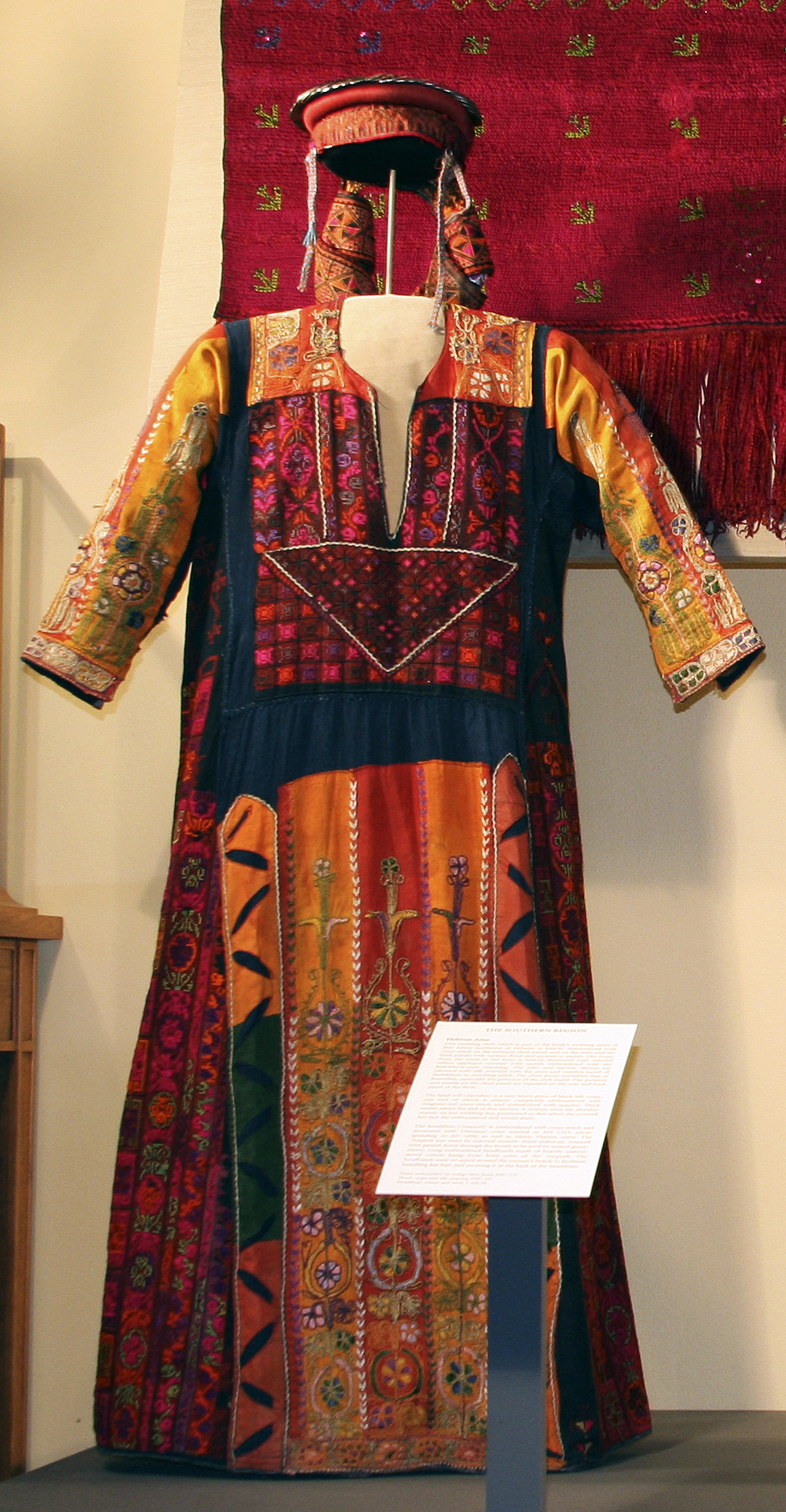
Bride's wedding attire from Bayt Jibrin, with the shambar expanded on the wall, exhibition at Oriental Institute, Chicago

Bayt Jibrin, together with Hebron and the surrounding villages, was known for its fine Palestinian embroidery. An example is a woman's jillayeh (wedding dress) from Bayt Jibrin, dated about 1900, in the Museum of International Folk Art (MOIFA) collection in Santa Fe, New Mexico. The dress is made of handwoven indigo linen with long, pointed wing-sleeves. The qabbeh ("chest-piece") is embroidered with the qelayed pattern; the maya ("water") motif, el-ferraneh ("the bakers wife") pattern, and the saru ("cypress") motif. The side panels are also covered with cross-stitch embroidery in a variety of traditional patterns.

Also on show is a late 19th-century shambar (large veil) from Bayt Jibrin worn at weddings and festivals. It is made of embroidered handwoven black silk with a separate heavy red silk fringe. A woman wore the shambar mainly on her wedding day, positioned so that when she covered her face the embroidered end would show. Another item in the collection is a headdress (iraqiyeh) embroidered with cross-stitch and decorated with Ottoman coins minted in AH 1223 (1808), as well as Maria Theresa coins. The iraqiyeh was worn by married women and elaborate pieces were passed down as family heirlooms. Long embroidered headbands made of cotton hanging from both sides were wrapped around the woman's braids to facilitate the bundling of her hair, then secured to the back of the headdress.

=== Shrines ===
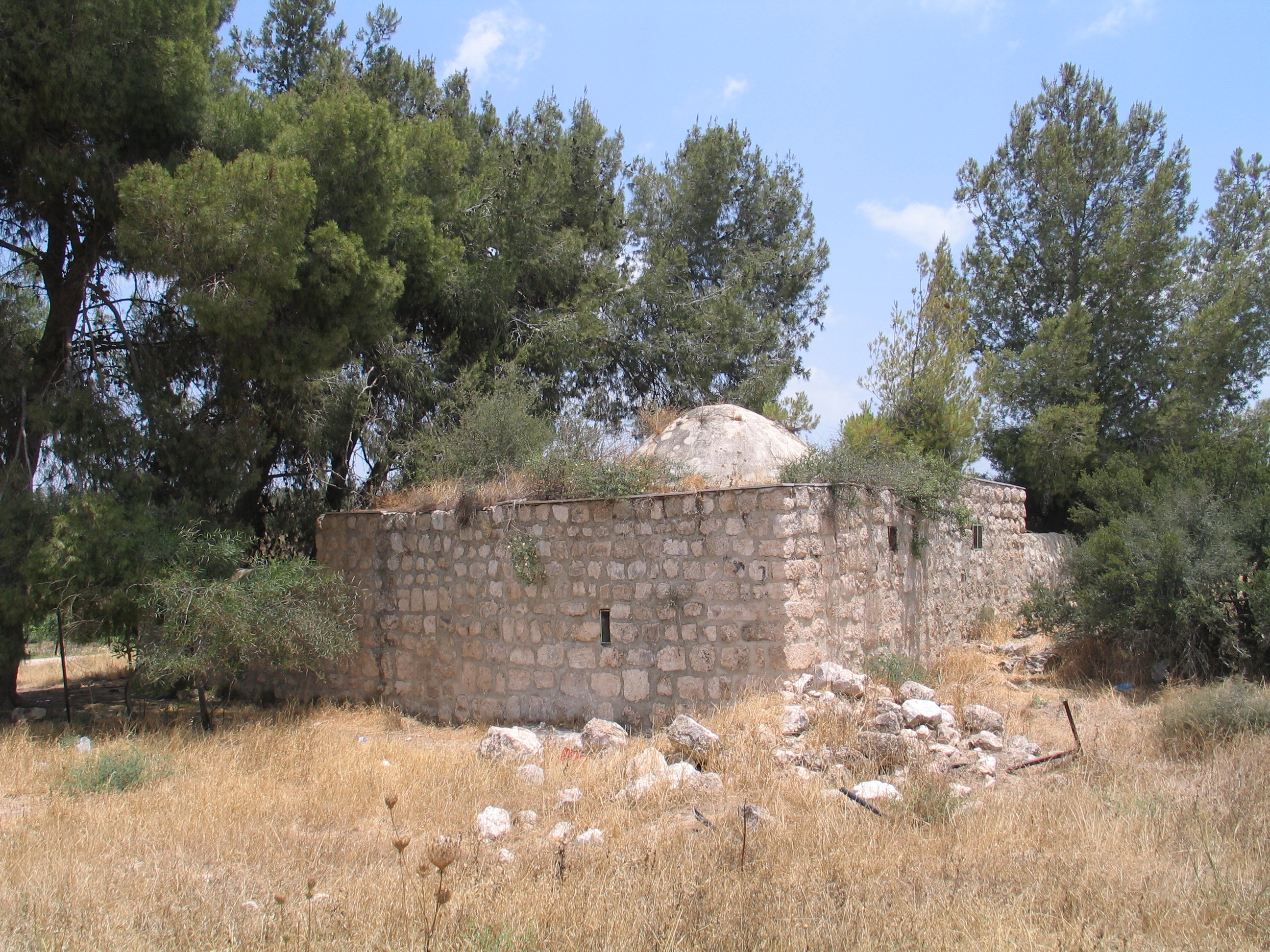
Maqam of Sheikh Tamim, traditionally taken to be Tamim al-Dari

In Islamic tradition, Bayt Jibrin is the burial place of the sahaba (companion) of Muhammad, Tamim al-Dari, who was famously known for his piety and briefly served as the governor of Jerusalem in the late 7th century. Al-Dari and his family were granted trusteeship over the Hebron Hills, including Bayt Jibrin, and were assigned as the supervisors of the Cave of the Patriarchs (Ibrahimi Mosque) in Hebron. His maqam or sanctuary is the most venerated site in Bayt Jibrin, located just northwest of it. Until the present day, al-Dari's sanctuary has been a place of local Muslim pilgrimage.

Other Islamic holy sites in the village include the maqam of a local shaykh named Mahmud, and the tomb of a shaykha (female religious figure) named Ameina.

== Prominent people ==
- Justus of Eleutheropolis or Joseph Barsabbas, one of two candidates chosen to replace Judas Iscariot after his betrayal and death
- Peter of Eleutheropolis, 3rd-century Christian martyr

== See also ==
At this site

- Beit Guvrin-Maresha National Park
- Kibbutz Beit Guvrin
- Maresha

Other topics

- Depopulated Palestinian locations in Israel
- Ibelin, Crusader castle at Tel Yavne on the coastal plain
- List of villages depopulated during the Arab-Israeli conflict
- National Parks of Israel
- Zebennus

== Bibliography ==
- Abu-Sitta, S. (2007). The Return Journey. London: Palestine Land Society. ISBN 978-0-9549034-1-1.
- Al-Muqaddasi (1994). The Best Divisions for Knowledge of the Regions. Translated by Basil Anthony Collins. Reading: Garnet Publishing. ISBN 1-873938-14-4.
- Amit, David (n.d.). "Wādi el-ʻUnqur". In Ben-Yosef, Sefi (ed.). Israel Guide - Judaea (A useful encyclopedia for the knowledge of the country) (in Hebrew). Vol. 9. Jerusalem: Keter Publishing House. OCLC 745203905.
- Barron, J. B., ed. (1923). Palestine: Report and General Abstracts of the Census of 1922. Government of Palestine.
- Benvenisti, Meron; Lepinski, Nadav, eds. (n.d.). "Beit Gubrin". Israel Guide - Judaea (A useful encyclopedia for the knowledge of the country) (in Hebrew). Vol. 9. Jerusalem: Keter Publishing House. OCLC 745203905.
- Blumberg, Arnold (1980). A View from Jerusalem, 1849-1858. The Consular Diary of James and Elisabeth Anne Finn. Associated University Presses. ISBN 0-8386-2271-2.
- Conder, C.R.; Kitchener, H.H. (1883). The Survey of Western Palestine: Memoirs of the Topography, Orography, Hydrography, and Archaeology. Vol. 3. London: Committee of the Palestine Exploration Fund.
- Dauphin, C. (1998). La Palestine byzantine, Peuplement et Populations. BAR International Series 726 (in French). Vol. III: Catalogue. Oxford: Archeopress. ISBN 0-860549-05-4.
- Finn, J. (1877). Byeways in Palestine. London: James Nisbet. Search for "Bait Jibreen" (Spring 1849: pp.176, 178-182, stay at Bait Jibreen, at the house of the brother of the sheik)(Spring 1853, note 182: fighting in Bayt Jibreen, at least 35 killed.)
- Finn, J. (1878). Finn, E. A. (ed.). Stirring Times, or, Records from Jerusalem Consular Chronicles of 1853 to 1856. Edited and Compiled by His Widow E. A. Finn. With a Preface by the Viscountess Strangford. Vol. 2. London: C.K. Paul & co.
- Furrer, Konrad (1865). "Wanderungen durch Palästina". Orell, Fussli und comp. pp. 97ff. Later edition quoted in Schölch
- Guérin, V. (1869). Description Géographique Historique et Archéologique de la Palestine (in French). Vol. 1: Judee, pt. 2. Paris: L'Imprimerie Nationale.
- Hadawi, S. (1970). Village Statistics of 1945: A Classification of Land and Area ownership in Palestine. Palestine Liberation Organization Research Center. Archived from the original on 8 December 2018.
- Hartmann, M. (1883). "Die Ortschaftenliste des Liwa Jerusalem in dem türkischen Staatskalender für Syrien auf das Jahr 1288 der Flucht (1871)". Zeitschrift des Deutschen Palästina-Vereins. 6: 102–149.
- Hütteroth, W.-D.; Abdulfattah, K. (1977). Historical Geography of Palestine, Transjordan and Southern Syria in the Late 16th Century. Erlanger Geographische Arbeiten, Sonderband 5. Erlangen, Germany: Vorstand der Fränkischen Geographischen Gesellschaft. ISBN 3-920405-41-2.
- Josephus (1981) [First published 1959]. The Jewish War. Penguin Classics. Translated by Williamson, G.A. (Revised ed.). Penguin Books. ISBN 0-14-044420-3. with Introduction, notes and appendices by E. Mary Smallwood.
- Khalidi, W. (1992). All That Remains: The Palestinian Villages Occupied and Depopulated by Israel in 1948. Washington D.C.: Institute for Palestine Studies. ISBN 0-88728-224-5.
- Le Strange, G. (1890). Palestine Under the Moslems: A Description of Syria and the Holy Land from A.D. 650 to 1500. Committee of the Palestine Exploration Fund.
- Mills, E., ed. (1932). Census of Palestine 1931. Population of Villages, Towns and Administrative Areas. Jerusalem: Government of Palestine.
- Morris, B. (2004). The Birth of the Palestinian Refugee Problem Revisited. Cambridge University Press. ISBN 978-0-521-00967-6.
- Morris, B. (2008). 1948: A History of the First Arab-Israeli War. Yale University Press. ISBN 9780300126969.
- Palmer, E.H. (1881). The Survey of Western Palestine: Arabic and English Name Lists Collected During the Survey by Lieutenants Conder and Kitchener, R. E. Transliterated and Explained by E.H. Palmer. Committee of the Palestine Exploration Fund.
- Peters, J.P.; Theirsch, H. (1989) [1905]. Painted Tombs in the necropolis of Marissa (Marêshah). London: Palestine Exploration Fund. p. 7. ISBN 9780790530994.
- Petersen, Andrew (2001). A Gazetteer of Buildings in Muslim Palestine (British Academy Monographs in Archaeology). Vol. 1. Oxford University Press. ISBN 978-0-19-727011-0. Archived from the original on 29 May 2021.
- Pringle, D. (1993). The Churches of the Crusader Kingdom of Jerusalem: A-K (excluding Acre and Jerusalem). Vol. I. Cambridge University Press. ISBN 0-521-39036-2.
- Pringle, D. (1997). Secular buildings in the Crusader Kingdom of Jerusalem: an archaeological Gazetter. Cambridge University Press. ISBN 0521-46010-7.
- Richard, Jean (1991) [1921]. The Crusaders c1071-c1291. Cambridge University Press. ISBN 0-521-62566-1. reprinted 2001
- Robinson, E.; Smith, E. (1841). Biblical Researches in Palestine, Mount Sinai and Arabia Petraea: A Journal of Travels in the year 1838. Vol. 2. Boston: Crocker & Brewster. Visited "Beit Jibrin" in 1838.
- Schick, C. (1896). "Zur Einwohnerzahl des Bezirks Jerusalem". Zeitschrift des Deutschen Palästina-Vereins. 19: 120–127.
- Schölch, A. (1993). Palestine in Transformation, 1856-1882 (PDF). Institute for Palestine Studies. ISBN 0-88728-234-2.
- Sharon, M. (1999). Corpus Inscriptionum Arabicarum Palaestinae, B-C. Vol. 2. BRILL. ISBN 90-04-11083-6.
- Sharon, M. (2004). Corpus Inscriptionum Arabicarum Palaestinae, D-F. Vol. 3. BRILL. ISBN 90-04-13197-3. (Bayt Jibrin p. xxxiv)
- Socin, A. (1879). "Alphabetisches Verzeichniss von Ortschaften des Paschalik Jerusalem". Zeitschrift des Deutschen Palästina-Vereins. 2: 135–163.
- Stillman, Yedida Kalfon (1979). Palestinian Costume and Jewelry. Albuquerque: University of New Mexico Press. ISBN 0-8263-0490-7.
- Thomson, W.M. (1859). The Land and the Book: Or, Biblical Illustrations Drawn from the Manners and Customs, the Scenes and Scenery, of the Holy Land. Vol. 2 (1st ed.). New York: Harper & brothers. pp. 358–360, 371, 375.
- Tristram, H.B. (1865). Land of Israel, A Journal of travel in Palestine, undertaken with special reference to its physical character. London: Society for Promoting Christian Knowledge. (Mohammed Isa of Bayt Jibrin: February–April 1864, p. 374, p. 377, p. 378, p. 381 and p. 506)
- Velde, van de, C.W.M. (1854). Narrative of a journey through Syria and Palestine in 1851 and 1852. Vol. 2. William Blackwood and son. (Search for "Beit Jebrin" og "Mosleh-el-Hasy": p. 72, 73, 138, 139, 142, 147–154, 157, 185, 190, 191)
- Village Statistics, April, 1945. Government of Palestine. 1945.
- Weir, Shelagh (1989). Palestinian Costume (exhibition catalog). London: British Museum Publications. ISBN 0-7141-2517-2.
