= Nilotic (disambiguation) =

The Nilotic peoples are a collection of ethnic groups indigenous to Nile Valley in East Africa.

Nilotic, which refers to the Nile River, valley or region in Africa, may also refer to:

- Nilotic landscape, any artistic representation of landscapes that emulates or is inspired by the Nile river in Egypt
- Nilotic languages, a group of languages spoken across a wide area between South Sudan and Tanzania
- Nilotic, a 2022 EP and eponymous single by Kenyan-Australian artist Elsy Wameyo

== See also ==
- Nilotic Kavirondo, the Luo people of Kenya, Tanzania and Uganda
- Nilotic Republic, or Nilotia an informal name for South Sudan
