= Beit Guvrin-Maresha National Park =

National park in Israel

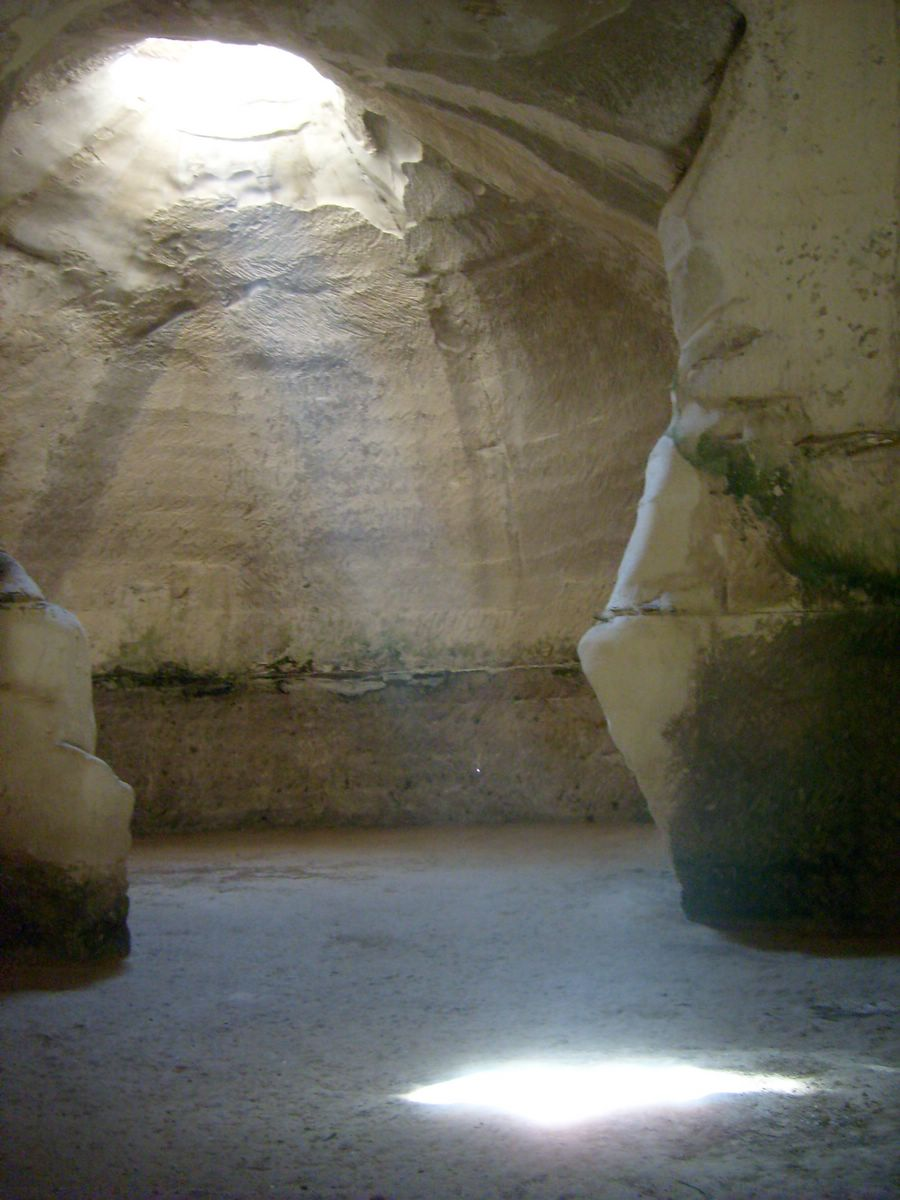
- "Bell cave" quarry at Beit Guvrin National Park
- Interactive map of Beit Guvrin-Maresha National Park
- Location: Southern District, Israel
- Nearest city: Kiryat Gat
- Coordinates: 31°35′49.06″N 34°54′2.33″E

UNESCO World Heritage Site
- Official name: Caves of Maresha and Bet-Guvrin in the Judean Lowlands as a Microcosm of the Land of the Caves
- Type: Cultural
- Criteria: v
- Designated: 2014 (38th session)
- Reference no.: 1370
- Region: Western Asia

Beit Guvrin-Maresha National Park is a national park in the Judaean Foothills of central Israel, containing a large network of caves recognized by UNESCO as a World Heritage Site.

The national park includes the remains of two historical towns. The first, Maresha, was an important town of the Kingdom of Judah during the First Temple period, which later continued through the Persian and Hellenistic periods and came to be inhabited largely by Idumeans. It is located in the southern part of the park. The northern part contains the remains of Beit Guvrin, a settlement that developed after the destruction of Maresha by the Parthians in 40 BCE and became the main town of the region. It was devastated in the Jewish–Roman wars, rebuilt, and in 200 CE it was elevated to city status and given the Greek name Eleutheropolis. After the Muslim conquest it became known as Bayt Jibrin, remaining a village (with a period of Crusader rule) until it was depopulated in 1948. Archaeological artifacts unearthed at the site include a large Jewish cemetery, a Roman-Byzantine amphitheater, a Byzantine church, public baths, mosaics and burial caves.

== Historical overview ==
The national park includes the remains of two historical towns: Maresha, located in the south, and Beit Guvrin, located in the north. It is located 13 kilometers from Kiryat Gat.

=== Maresha ===
Tel Maresha (Modern Hebrew) or Tell Sandahannah (Arabic) is the site of Iron Age (biblical) Mareshah, which continued through the Persian and into the Hellenistic period. The earliest written record of Mareshah was as a city in ancient Judah (Joshua 15:44). The city of mu-ukh-ra-ash-ti, sometimes rendered in English as Muhrashti, of the Amarna Letters (14th century BCE, during the Early Bronze Age) is unlikely to be the predecessor of Iron Age Maresha, as no remains older than the Iron Age were unearthed there by archaeologists. The Hebrew Bible mentions among other episodes that Rehoboam fortified it against Egyptian attack. After the destruction of the Kingdom of Judah, the city of Maresha became part of the Edomite kingdom. In the late Persian period a Sidonian community settled in Maresha, and the city is mentioned in the Zenon Papyri (259 BC). During the Maccabean Revolt, Maresha was a base for attacks against Judea and suffered retaliation from the Maccabees. After Hasmonean king John Hyrcanus I captured and destroyed Maresha in 112 BCE, the region of Idumea remained under Hasmonean control. In 40 BC the Parthians devastated completely the "strong cite", after which it was never rebuilt.

Historical names include:

- Maresha (Biblical, recent spelling), in the Iron Age and thus in the Hebrew Bible. Classical spelling: Mareshah.
  - Marisa/Marissa (c.300 BCE - 40 BCE) during the Hellenistic period and (see Flavius Josephus) part of the Roman period
- Tell Sandahannah the name of the site in pre-modern and modern times until the mid-20th century

=== Bet Guvrin / Eleutheropolis / Bayt Jibrin ===
Beth Gabra or Beit Guvrin was established after the destruction of the city on the tell (mound) by the Parthians in 40 BCE, starting from a suburb of then 600-year-old Maresha/Marisa. It succeeded Maresha as the main town of the area. Conquered by the Roman general Vespasian during the Jewish War (68 CE) and completely destroyed during the Bar Kochba revolt (132–135 CE), it was re-established as a Roman colony and in the year 200 it received the title of a city and the ius italicum, under the new name of "Eleutheropolis", 'city of freemen'. Sources from the Byzantine period mention both Christian and Jewish personalities living in the city. A large Jewish community existed during the Roman and Byzantine Periods and famous Tannaim and Amoraim resided here.

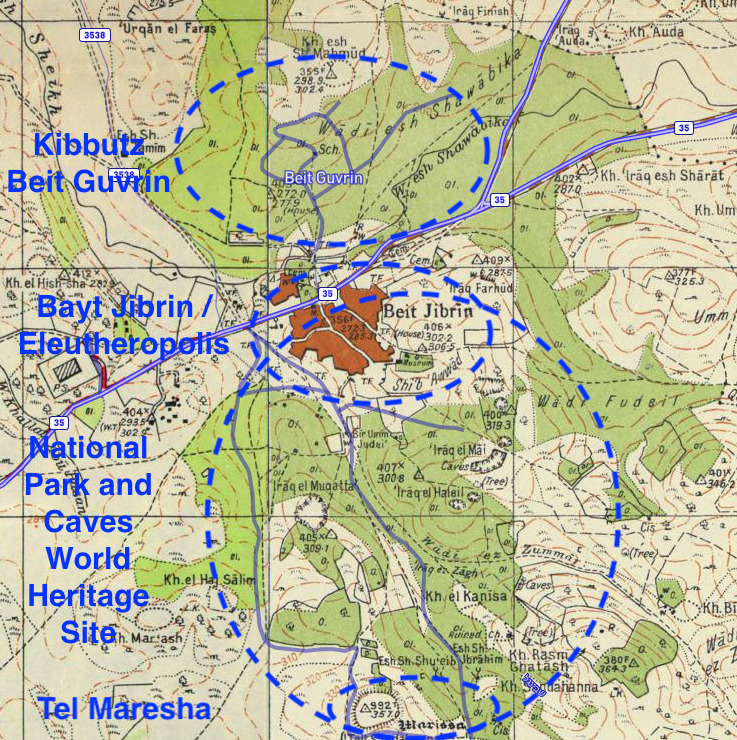
Map of Kibbutz Beit Guvrin, historical Bayt Jibrin-Eleutheropolis, the national park with ancient World Heritage Site caves, and Tel Maresha (1940s Survey of Palestine map with modern overlay)

Historic names include:

- Beth Gabra (c. 1 CE - c. 630 CE) in Aramaic, meaning "house of the strong men"; graecised as Betogabris. Also Baetogabra (Βαιτογάβρα; Ptolemy, Geography, c. 150 CE), and Betogabri in the Latin-language Peutinger tables.
- Eleutheropolis, name given by Septimius Severus in 200 CE (Late Roman period) when he raised it to the status of a city under the ius italicum; remained in use during the Byzantine period, alongside the earlier graecised Aramaic name
- Beit/Bait Jibrin (c.630 - 1948 CE) in Arabic during the Early Muslim and later periods
- Bethgibelin, Beit Gibelin, Bersabea, Gybelin, Ybelin Hospitaliorum (royal castle built c. 1135, handed over to Hospitallers in 1136, held until 1187 and in 1240-1244 CE) during the Crusader period

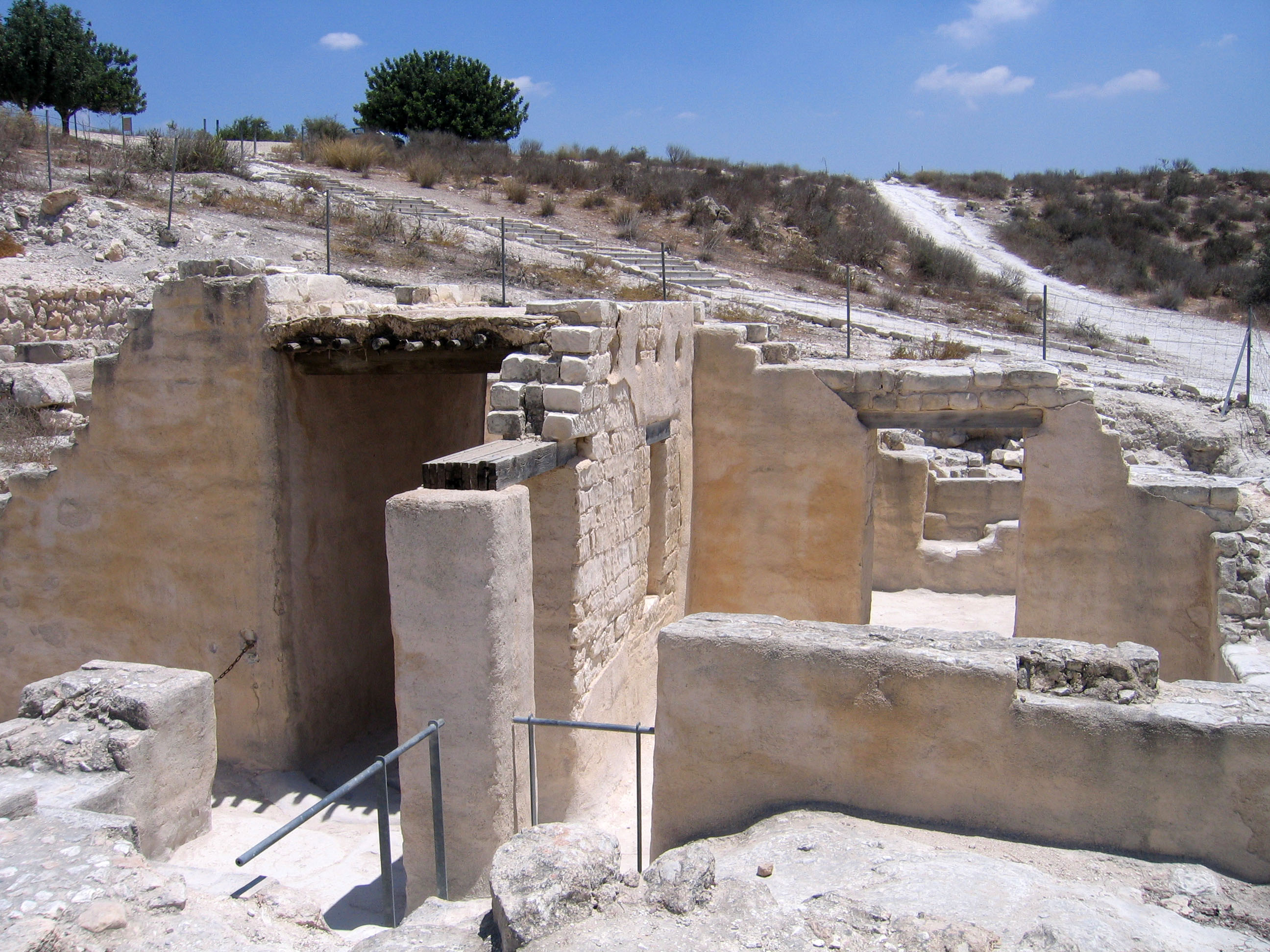
Maresha dwellings

=== Archaeological excavations ===
Maresha was first excavated in 1898–1900 by Bliss and Macalister, who uncovered a planned and fortified Hellenistic city encircled by a town wall with towers. Two Hellenistic and one Israelite stratum were identified by them on the mound. Many of the ancient city's olive presses, columbaria and water cisterns can still be seen.

Both Maresha and Beit Guvrin/Eleutheropolis were excavated after 1989 and 1992 respectively by the Israeli archaeologist Amos Kloner. Important finds at the latter site were the amphitheater built by the Roman army units stationed there, a large Roman bath house, and from the Crusader period a fortress integrating the walls of the Roman amphitheater and bath house, as well as an attached church.

== Sites ==
=== Burial caves ===
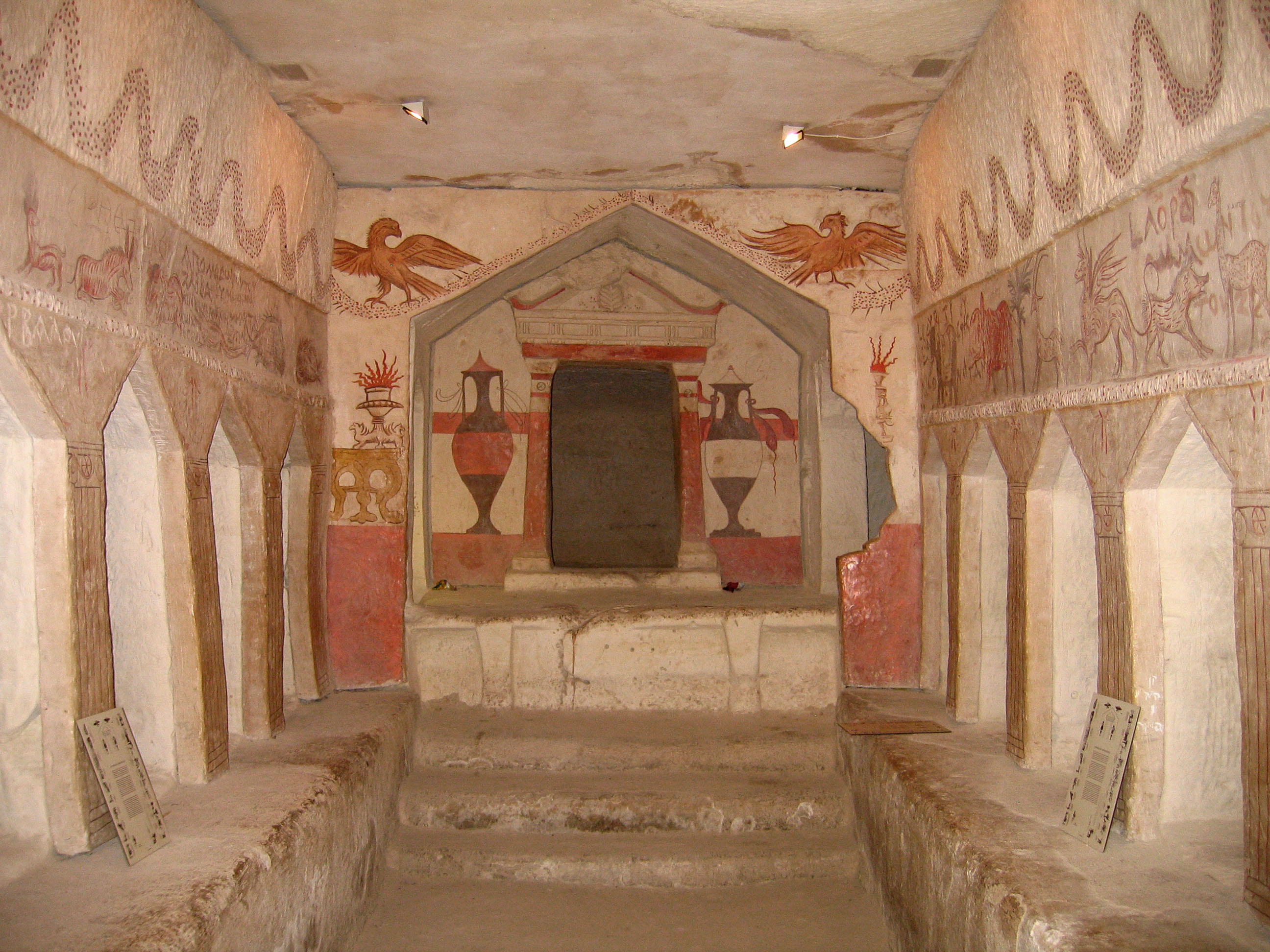
The Apollophanes Cave, also known as the Sidonian Tomb

The Sidonian burial caves were the family tomb of Apollophanes, the leader of the Sidonian community in Beit Guvrin. The Sidonian caves are the only ones that are painted inside. The caves were burial caves for the Greek, Sidonian and Edumite inhabitants of Beit Guvrin. The first and largest cave, known as the Apollophanes Cave, the "Sidonian Tomb" or "Tomb E I", has paintings of animals, real and mythic, above the niches where the corpses were laid. A cock crows to scare away demons; the three-headed dog Cerberus guards the entrance to the underworld; a bright red phoenix symbolizes the life after death. The Tomb of the Musicians is decorated with a painting showing a man playing the flute and a woman playing the harp.

=== Bell caves ===
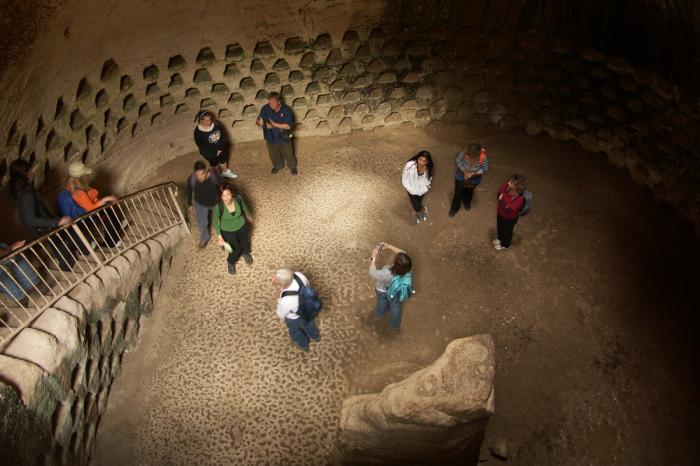
"The Polish Cave" with columbarium (dovecote)

There are about 800 bell-shaped caves located in the area. Many of the caves are linked via an underground network of passageways that connect groups of 40–50 caves.

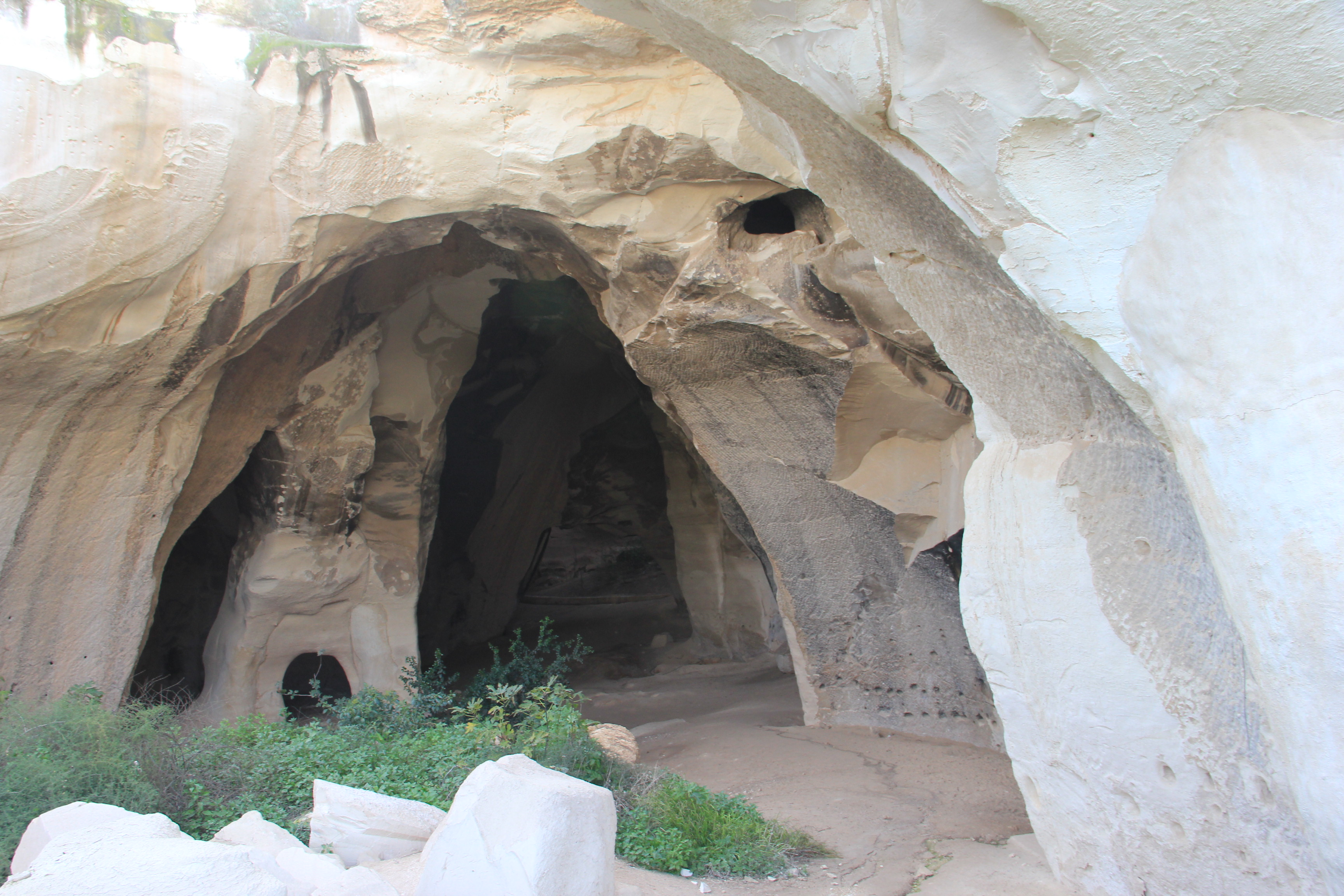
Bell Caves at the Beit Govrin National Park

The largest bell caves are in the east part of the park. They have been dug since prehistoric times, the excavations reaching their zenith in the Hellenistic period and during the Byzantine and Early Arab Period, when blocks of chalkstone extracted from the caves were used for construction work (buildings, etc.). The bell caves consist of limestone in their upper-layer (to a depth of about one to two meters), beneath which is rock consisting solely of a beige-colored, soft chalkstone, utilized by its early inhabits for carving caverns and dwellings. There are numerous bell caves within the park grounds and events are held in one of them. They are large (over 60 feet (18 m) high), airy and easily accessible.

=== Columbaria ===
The National Park is known for some of the best preserved columbaria from the Hellenistic and Roman periods. One of the largest is located on the west side of Tell Maresha (Khurbet es Sandahannah), described by Conder and Kitchener in their Survey of Western Palestine, and formerly known by its local inhabitants as Es Sûk. It has been carved underground from the soft chalkstone endemic to the area, and built with tiers of niches capable of housing hundreds of brooding pigeons.

=== Cave dwellings ===
There are a number of cave-like dwellings carved from the chalkstone bedrock, some of which display a vast extension of networks and passageways, with staircases descending down into the depth, made with step-like balustrades, and replete with cisterns for storing water and millstones for grinding olives. These caverns and dwellings, though not situated on the eminence of the Tell itself, were considered part and parcel with the city of Maresha itself, as they were later enclosed by a wall that encompassed both the city and its expanded suburbs. The largest and most impressive of these caverns and dwelling places is that built near the Tell on its southeast side, and which the locals knew by the name Mŭghâret Sandahannah (The Cave of Saint Anne). Today, in Modern Hebrew, the same cave dwelling is called Mavokh (Maze).

=== Church of Saint Anne ===
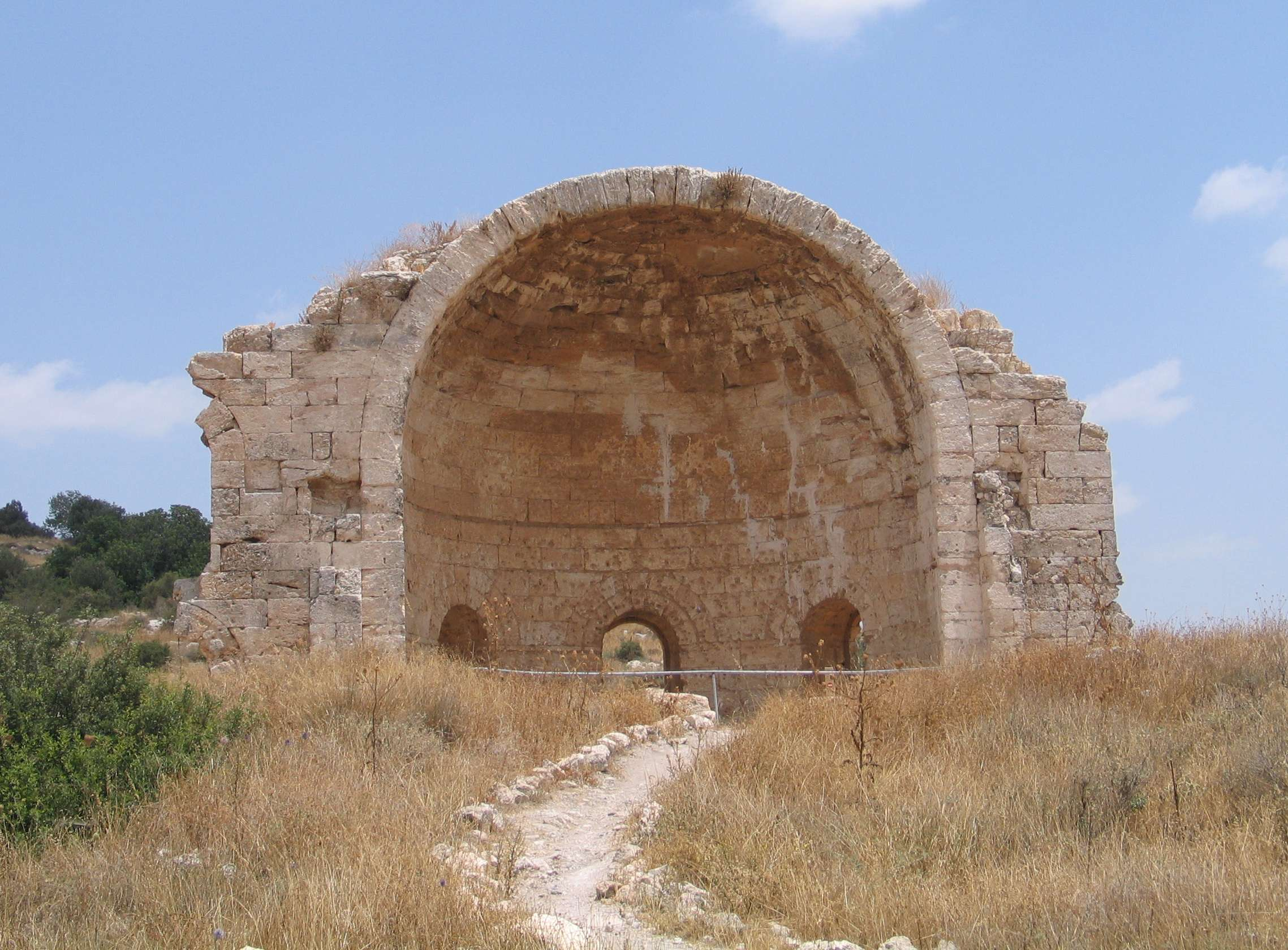
The ruins of the Church of St Anne, called Sandahanna in Arabic.

Saint Anne's church was first built in the Byzantine period and then rebuilt by the Crusaders in the 12th century. The ruin is known in Arabic as Khirbet (lit. "ruin") Sandahanna, the nearby tell (mound) of Maresha being called Tell Sandahanna. The freestanding remains of the apse are well preserved (see photo).

=== Amphitheater ===
The remains of a Roman amphitheater were uncovered in the mid-1990s. The amphitheater was built in the 2nd century, on the northwestern outskirts of Beit Guvrin. This amphitheater, in which gladiatorial contests took place, could seat about 3,500 spectators. It had a walled arena of packed earth, with subterranean galleries. The arena was surrounded by a series of connected barrel vaults, which formed a long, circular corridor and supported the stone seats above it; staircases led from the outside and from the circular corridor to the tribunes. It was built for the Roman troops stationed in the region after the suppression of the Bar Kochba rebellion. The amphitheater is an elliptical structure built of large rectangular limestone ashlars. It was in use until destroyed in the Galilee earthquake of 363.

=== Other finds ===
Byzantine mosaics depicting birds and animals were discovered on the hilltop in 1924.

Several hundred astragali – animal knucklebone dice – used 2,300 years ago during the Hellenistic period for divination and gaming have been found at the site since 2000.

Among other major archaeological finds at this site is the Heliodorus Stele. This stele recounts events in Judaea prior to the Maccabean revolt and offers important historical evidence for events which modern day Jews commemorate during the holiday of Hanukkah.

== See also ==
- Kibbutz Beit Guvrin
- National Parks of Israel
- Archaeology of Israel
- List of Caves
