= Nile mosaic of Palestrina =

Late Hellenistic floor mosaic near Rome

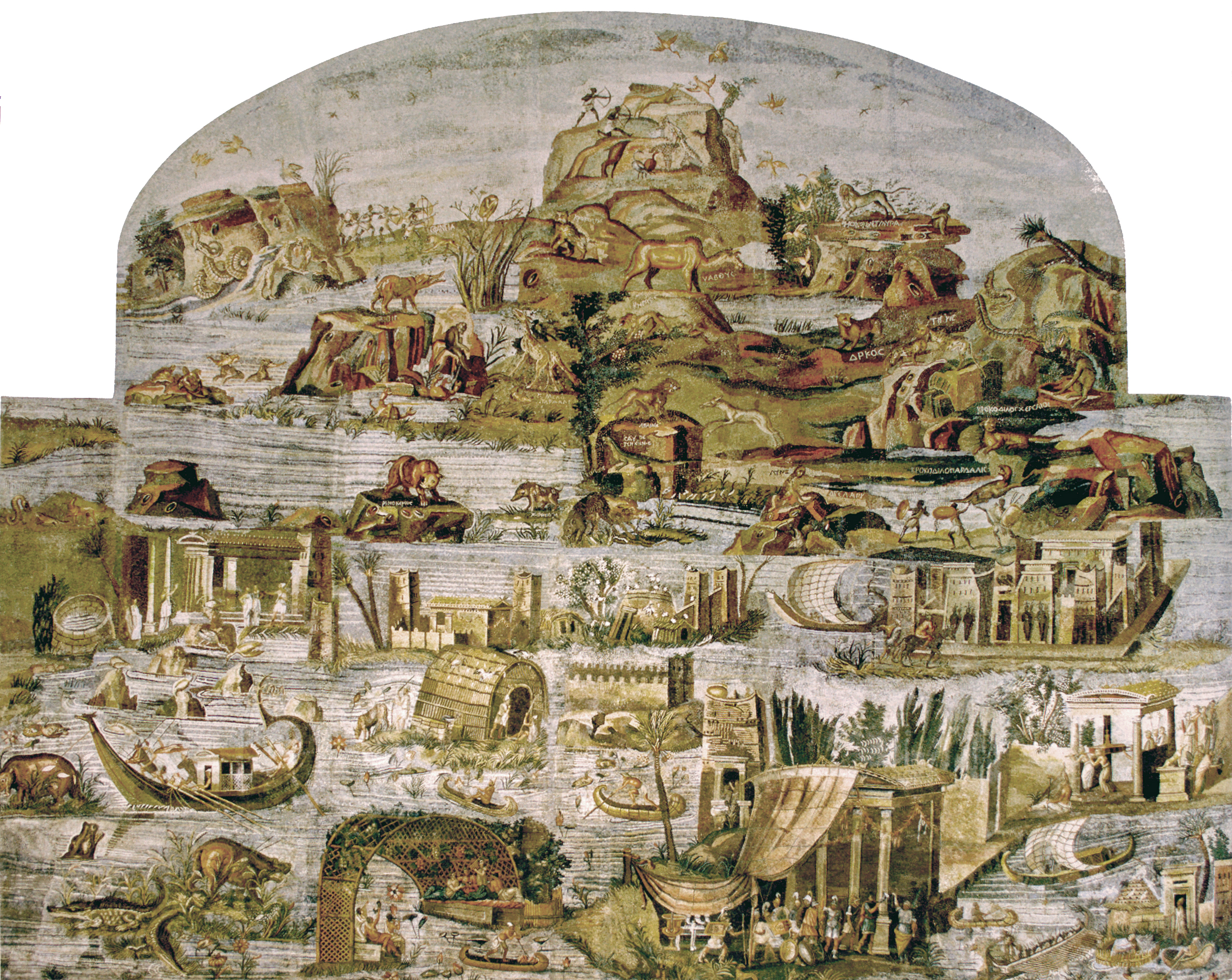
The Nile Mosaic of Palestrina.

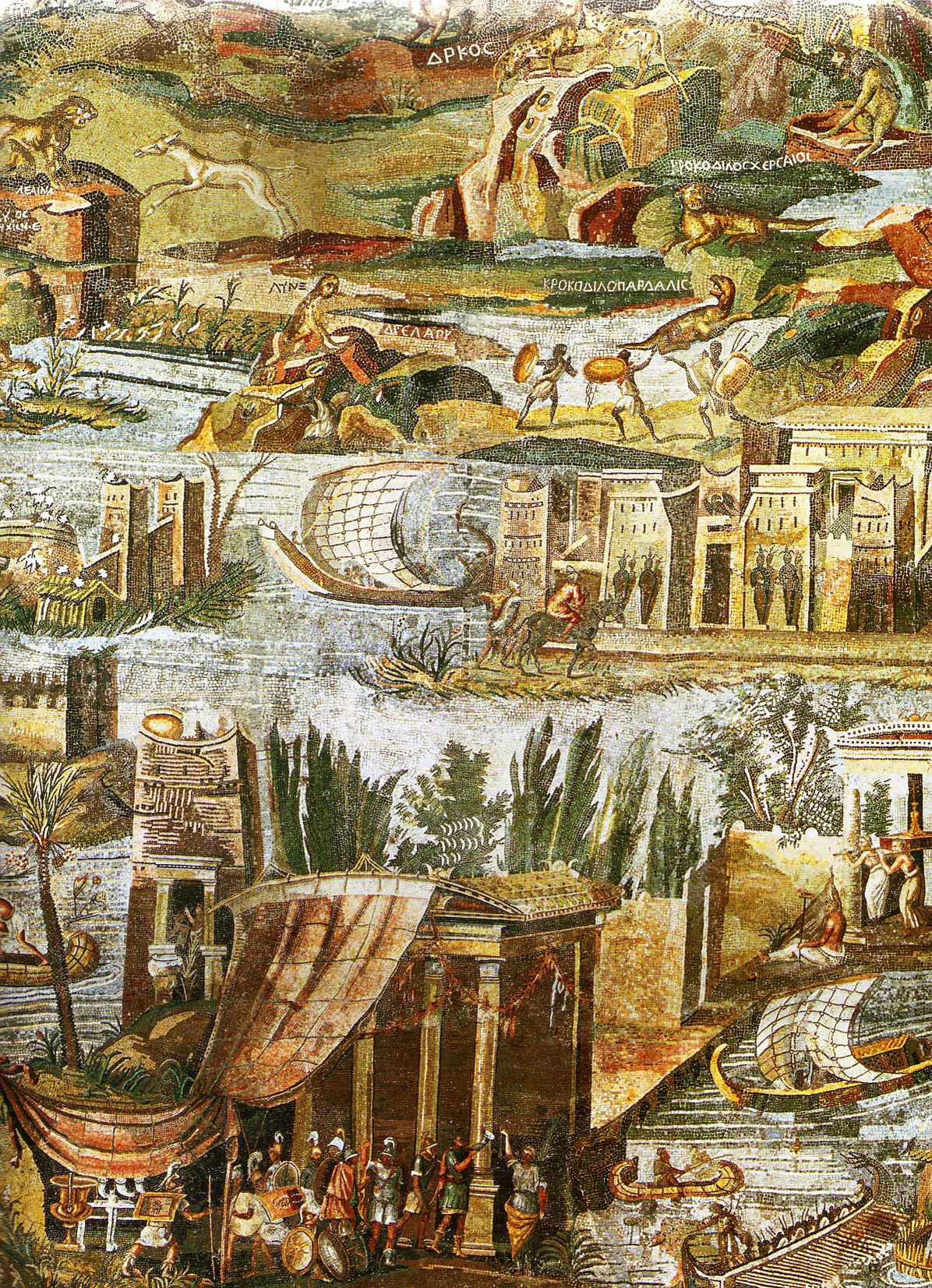
A detail of the mosaic.

The Palestrina Mosaic or Nile mosaic of Palestrina is an ancient floor mosaic depicting the Nile in its passage from the Blue Nile to the Mediterranean. The mosaic was part of a Classical sanctuary-grotto in Palestrina, a town east of Ancient Rome, in central Italy. It has a width of 5.85 metres and a height of 4.31 metres and provides a glimpse into the Roman fascination with ancient Egyptian exoticism in the 1st century BC, both as an early manifestation of the role of Egypt in the Roman imagination and an example of the genre of "Nilotic landscape", with a long iconographic history in Egypt and the Aegean.

== Description ==
The mosaic, with an arch-headed framing that identifies its original location as flooring an apse in a grotto, features detailed depictions of Ptolemaic Greeks, Aethiopians in hunting scenes, and various animals of the Nile river. It is the earliest Roman depiction of Nilotic scenes, of which several more were uncovered at Pompeii. The work has been variously dated and interpreted. Paul G. P. Meyboom suggests a date shortly before the reign of Sulla (ca. 100 BC) and treats the mosaic as an early evidence for the spread of Egyptian cults in Italy, where Isis was syncretised with Fortuna. He believes Nilotic scenes were introduced in Rome by Demetrius the Topographer, a Greek artist from Ptolemaic Egypt active ca. 165 BC. Claire Préaux emphasises the "escapist" nature of the fantastic scenery. Others have proposed it represents the conquest of Egypt by Octavian, a travel there by Hadrian or an homage of Alexander the Great to the temple of Ammon.

== History ==
=== Origins ===
The mosaic may have been indicated in a well-known passage in Pliny's Natural History concerning mosaic floors in Italy:

Mosaics came into use as early as Sulla's régime. At all events there exists even today one made of very small tesserae which he installed in the temple of Fortune at Palestrina.

The Nile Mosaic and its companion piece, the Fish Mosaic, were apparently still to be seen in situ in the 15th century. When first noticed shortly before 1507 by Antonio Volsco, a humanist in the circle of Pomponio Leto, the mosaics were still in situ among the vestiges of Sulla's sanctuary of Fortuna Primigenia. Volsco added that these were "arranged in the pattern of a picture". Maurizio Calvesi, in identifying Francesco Colonna as the author of Hypnerotomachia Poliphili, identifies passages in Hypnerotomachia depending on Pliny that were enriched by direct experience of the mosaics themselves.

At that time the town was owned by the Colonna family of Rome, whose palazzo in Palestrina occupied a section of the ruins.

The mosaic was examined in 1614 (with copious sprinklings of water to enliven its colored images) by Federico Cesi, the founder of the Accademia dei Lincei, who came to Palestrina on the occasion of his marriage to Artemisia Colonna. Cesi, who can be considered the true discoverer of the mosaic, ordered the painter Cassiano dal Pozzo to reproduce it, who drew no less than eighteen plates. About a decade later, the mosaic was purchased by Cardinal Andrea Peretti (bishop of Palestrina from 1624 to 1626), who had it detached, divided into square fragments and transferred to Rome.

In 1640 the new cardinal of Palestrina, Francesco Barberini, managed to obtain the mosaic again as a gift, which he had restored by Giovan Battista Caiandra. He then arranged for it to be relocated back to Palestrina, but during transport the mosaic work, placed on wagons to the contrary, suffered such damage that it had to be restored again by Caiandra whith help of the panels executed by Cassiano dal Pozzo. Brought back, after some time, to Palestrina it was placed in a room of the baronial palace.

=== 17th century ===
In the 17th century, Palestrina passed to the Barberini family, who between 1624 and 1626 removed most of the mosaic from its setting, without recording the overall composition, and, after further movements and damage, put it on exhibition in the Palazzo Barberini in Palestrina, where it remains. The mosaic was restored and repaired on numerous occasions, but careful watercolors of the sections were made for Cassiano dal Pozzo before the initial restoration in the opificio of St. Peter's. Helen Whitehouse's rediscovery of the long-lost watercolors enabled a reconstruction of the surviving segments in a more meaningful way although much remains uncertain about the original composition. The mosaic has been a major feature of the Museo Nazionale Prenestino in the Palazzo Barberini in Palestrina since 1953.

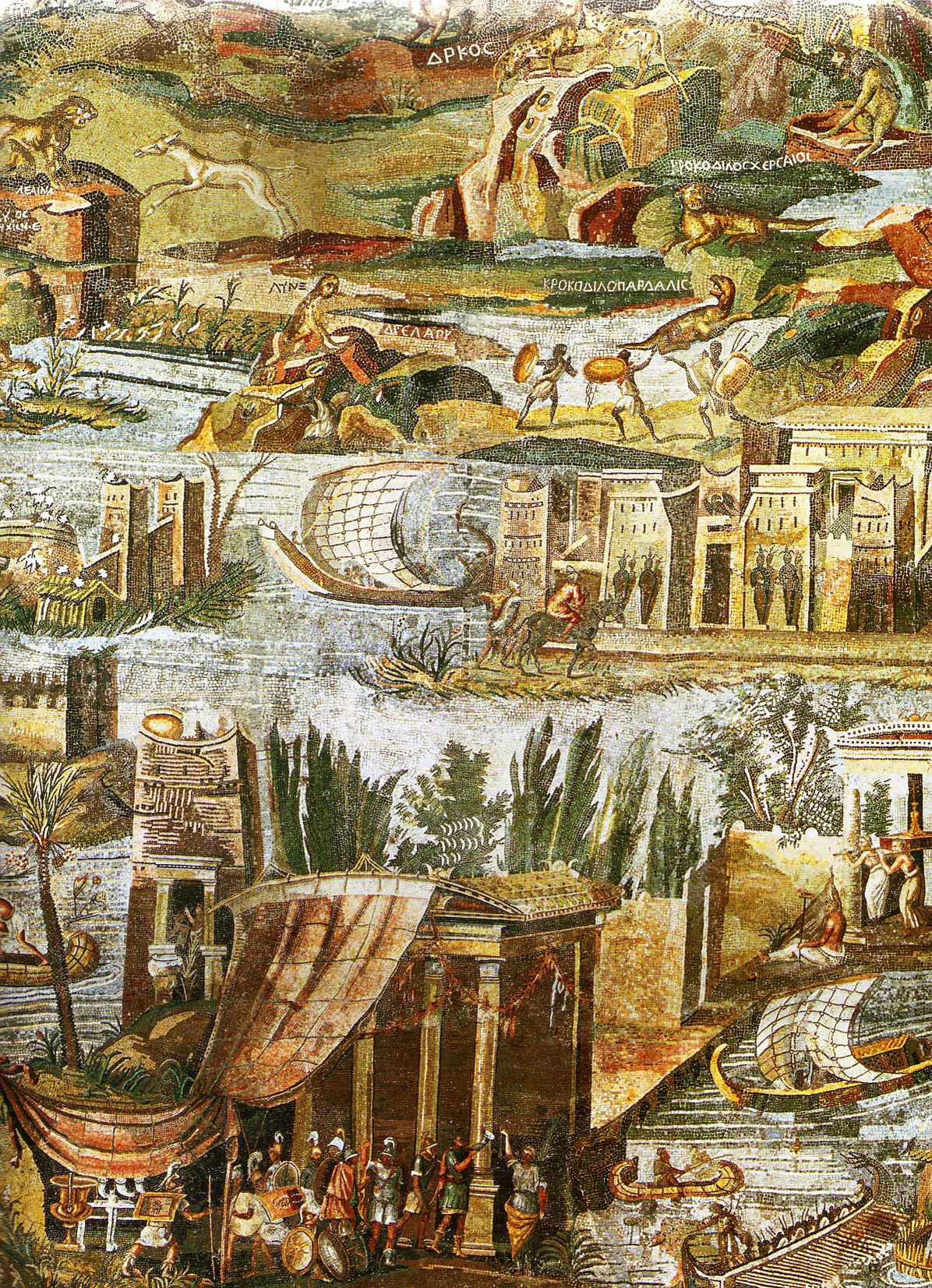

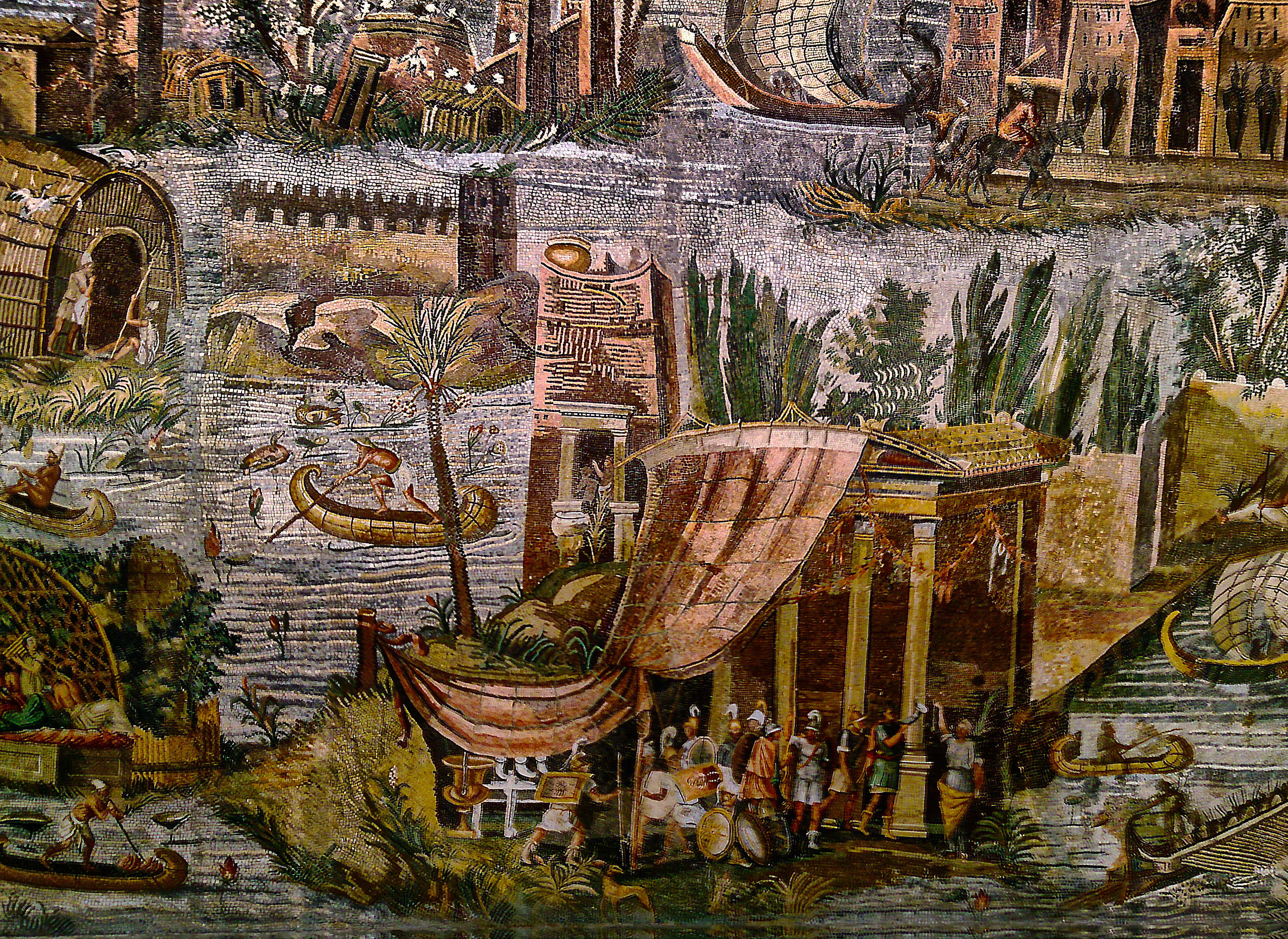

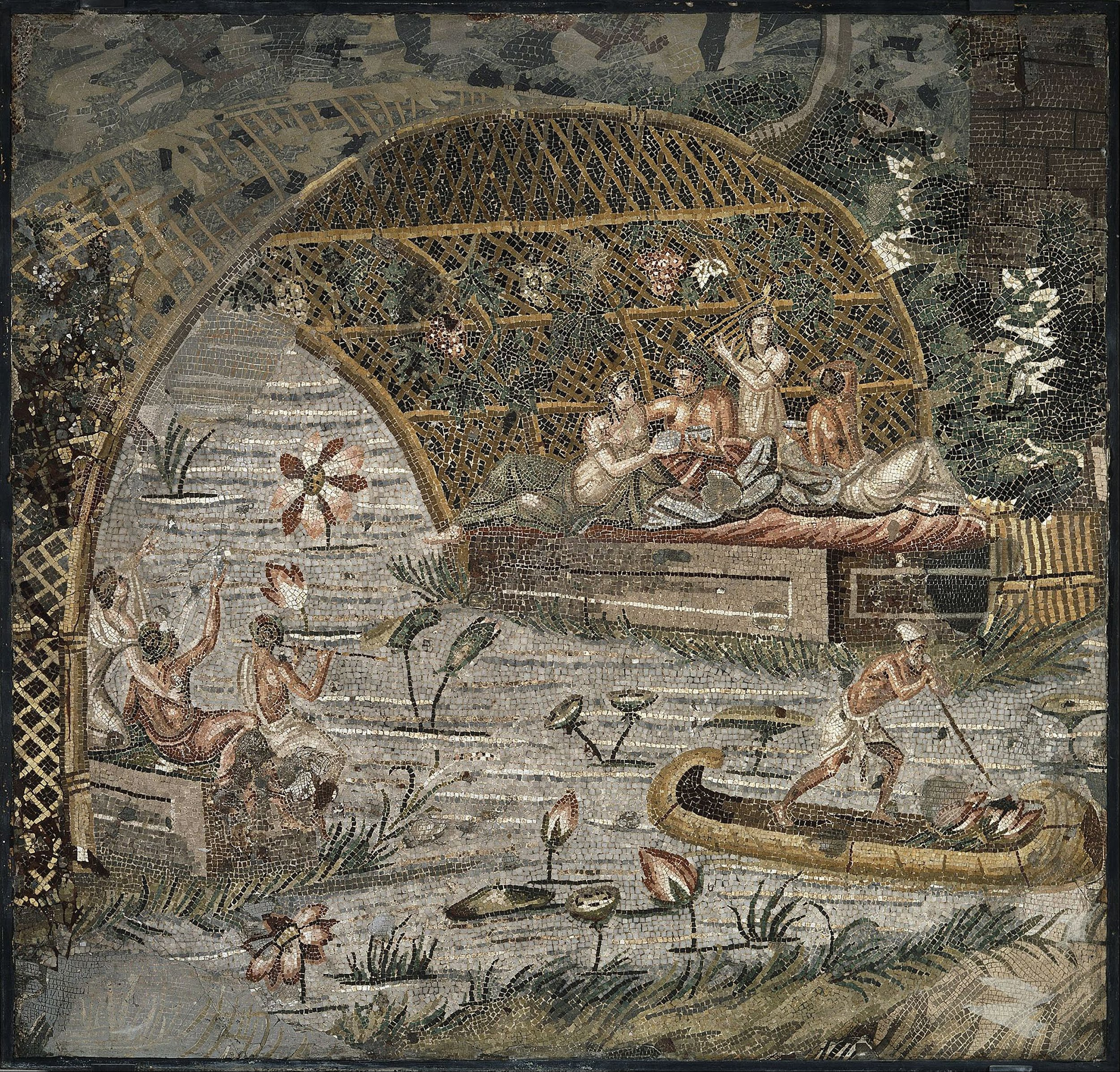

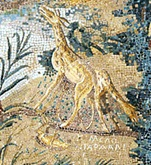

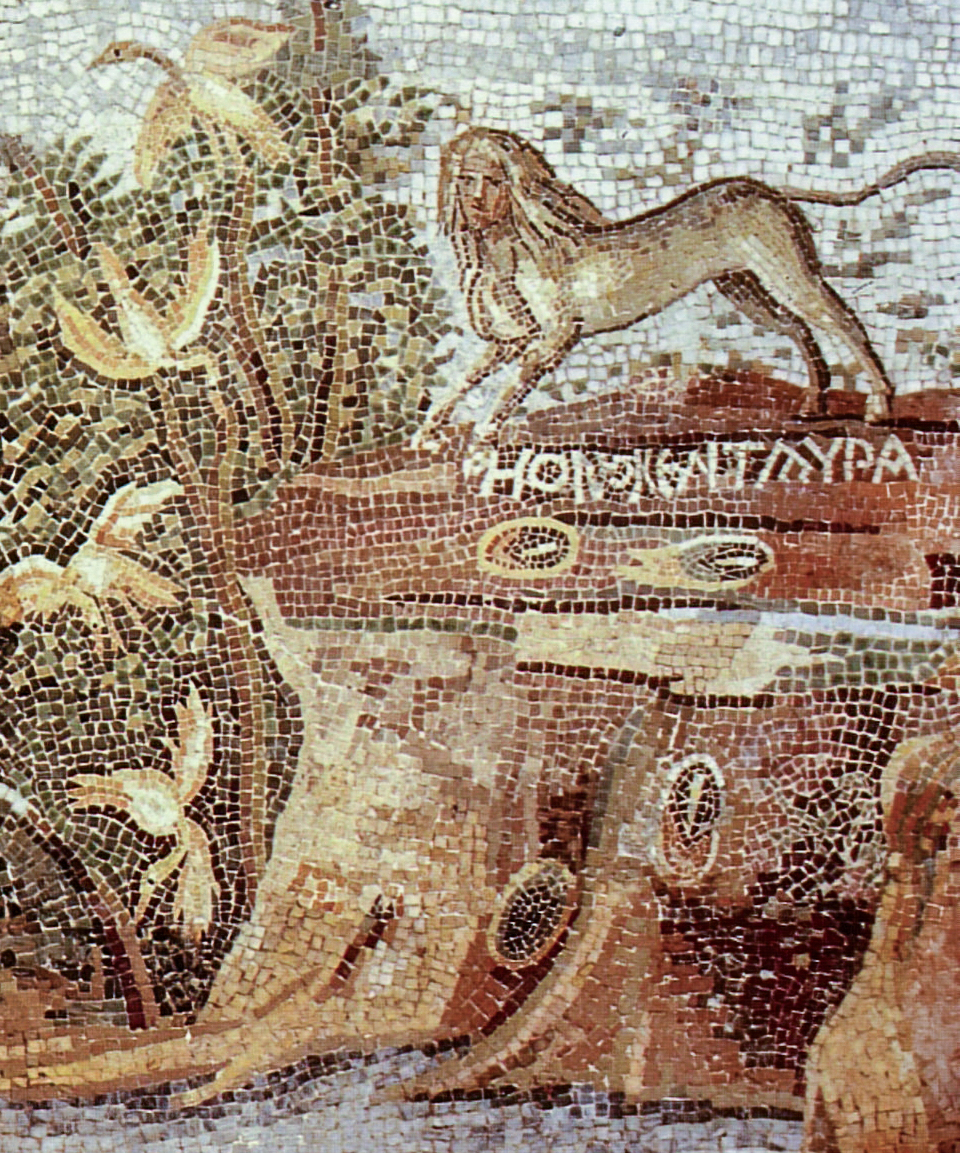

== See also ==
- Apollophanes Cave
- House of the Faun

== Sources ==
- Finley, The Light of the Past, 1965, p. 93.
- C. Roemer, R. Matthews, Ancient Perspectives on Egypt, Routledge Cavendish 2003, pp. 194ff.
- Paul G. P. Meyboom, The Nile Mosaic of Palestrina: Early Evidence of Egyptian Religion in Italy, Leiden:Brill 1995, pp. 80ff
