= Apollophanes Cave =

Rock-cut tomb in Beit Guvrin–Maresha National Park, Israel

- Sidonian Tomb, Tomb E I, T551
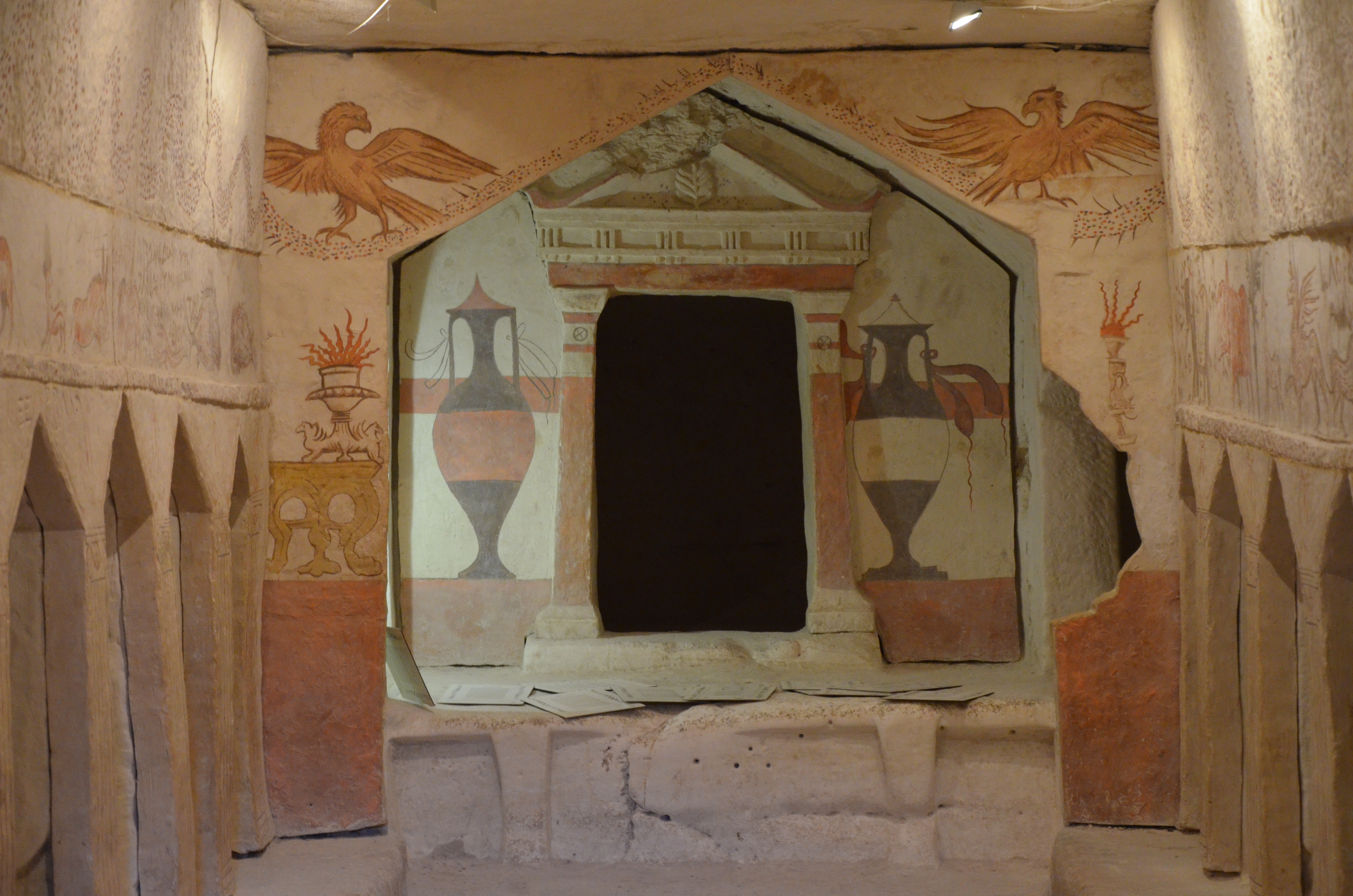
- Interior

- Location within Israel
- Interactive map of Apollophanes Cave
- 31°35′26.3″N 34°54′13.5″E
- Cultures: Hellenistic
- Location: Beit Guvrin-Maresha National Park, Israel
- Region: Judaean Lowlands (Shephelah)
- Part of: Painted tombs in the eastern necropolis of Maresha

History
- Built: Hellenistic period (3rd–2nd century BCE)
- Built for: Family of Apollophanes, head of the Sidonian community
- Abandoned: c. 1st century BCE

Site notes
- Archaeologists: John P. Peters and Hermann Thiersch
- Discovered: 1902
- Restored: 1993
- Condition: Restored
- Public access: Yes (within national park)

UNESCO World Heritage Site
- Official name: Beit Guvrin-Maresha National Park
- Criteria: (v)
- Designated: 2014
- Reference no.: 1370

The Apollophanes Cave, also known as the "Sidonian Tomb" and catalogued as Tomb E I, is a rock-cut tomb in the eastern necropolis of Maresha, now part of Israel's Beit Guvrin-Maresha National Park. It is the northernmost of two richly decorated Hellenistic tombs first recorded there by J. P. Peters and H. Thiersch in 1902, and takes its name from Apollophanes son of Sesmaeus, who is identified in one of its inscriptions as the head ("archon") of the Sidonians at Maresha.

The cave is decorated with multicoloured wall paintings, including a doorway guarded by Cerberus and a pair of roosters, a long frieze of animals and mythological creatures, and painted architectural ornaments imitating columns and a Doric entablature. It also preserves several Greek funerary inscriptions naming Apollophanes and his relatives, together with a much studied erotic verse graffito.

According to the original excavators, the human figures in the tomb were defaced by villagers from Bayt Jibrin shortly after they discovered the site, reportedly on religious grounds. The original colours faded soon after the tomb's publication, and the murals visible today are reconstructions created during a 1993 restoration.

The tomb has become the principal evidence for a Sidonian, and thus Phoenician, community at Maresha, then a major city of classical Idumaea whose population was otherwise dominated by Idumaeans. The Sidonian community is therefore generally regarded as having formed part of the city's elite. A minority reinterpretation by Dalit Regev, published in 2023, instead argues that "Sidonians" functioned as an instrumental, status-conveying label rather than an ethnic one.

== Setting ==
Maresha (Hebrew: מָרֵשָׁה; Ancient Greek: Μαρίση, romanized: Marisē) was an important city in the Judaean Lowlands (Shephelah) and one of the principal cities of classical Idumaea. The region's population was dominated by Idumaeans, descendants of the Iron Age Edomites, who had migrated there from southern Transjordan during the Babylonian conquest of the Kingdom of Judah. In the Hellenistic period, the entire region became contested between the Ptolemaic Egypt and the Seleucid Empire. Maresha remained under Ptolemaic rule throughout the 3rd century BCE before passing to the Seleucid Empire around 198 BCE. During this period, the city was a center of the regional slave trade and a seat of Greek officials.

During the Maccabean Revolt beginning in 167 BCE, Maresha served as a Seleucid base for operations against Judea, prompting retaliatory attacks by the Maccabees. In 113/112 BCE, it was captured by the Hasmonean ruler John Hyrcanus, who compelled the local Idumaean population to convert to Judaism. Around 40 BCE, the town was destroyed by the Parthians and the Hasmonean king they supported, Mattathias Antigonus, and was never resettled, resulting in an exceptionally rich archaeological record.

The tombs of Maresha's necropolis bear Greek rather than Aramaic inscriptions. Their mixed onomasticon (collection of proper names) has been interpreted as evidence of a syncretic, multicultural milieu in which ethnic affiliation is difficult to determine.

== Discovery, documentation and conservation ==
The Apollophanes Cave was one of four tombs at Maresha shown to John Punnett Peters and Hermann Thiersch in 1902, making them the first scholars to document the site. (Note: Two of these four tombs, the Apollophanes Cave (Tomb E I) and the neighbouring "Musicians Cave" (Tomb E II) were richly decorated.) The two men had met in Jerusalem earlier that year and were jointly touring sites previously investigated by Frederick J. Bliss and R. A. Stewart Macalister when a Nubian guide led them down into the tomb. Their findings appeared in a 1905 report, "Painted Tombs in the Necropolis of Marissa," which remains the essential documentation of the tomb. The tombs had been discovered months earlier by inhabitants of the nearby village of Bayt Jibrin, who had defaced the painted human figures:

We were informed also that the paintings, which we found in a damaged condition, were, at the time of discovery, in a perfect state of preservation. The heads which had been scratched out were effaced, so we were told, by the Sheikh of Beit Jibrin, a pious Moslem, who, on entering the tombs, cried out ḥaram, "forbidden," and drawing his knife from his girdle, scratched out forthwith the faces of the trumpeter, the rider and the Ethiopian on the animal frieze. [...] Later, in spite of all our efforts to protect the tombs, native notoriety hunters and souvenir collectors wrote their names on the walls or broke off pieces of painted stone or stucco.

Peters and Thiersch were shown the tomb almost by accident, at the close of a day spent viewing already known caves; their guide led them to an inconspicuous hole, and one of the pair descended only on the guide's repeated assurances of its importance. They returned the next morning with candles, paper, and ink to record the tomb before it suffered further damage. On the way, they encountered the village imam, who reportedly cursed their guide and instructed him "not to show the tombs to infidels and strangers," but the presence of an "a zaptieh [Ottoman police officer] from Beersheba", kept opposition at bay. Fearing that "further injury might be done," the two scholars spent the day measuring the tombs, sketching their decoration, and copying inscriptions with whatever materials the village could supply. A week later they returned with the American consul, Selah Merrill, and Jerusalem photographer Khalil Raad, whose large-format photographs of the tomb interiors were hampered by poor ventilation and magnesium smoke.

During this second visit, the pair camped on the hill above the first tomb for about three days, during which they discovered two more tombs. (Note: These are the so-called Tomb III and Tomb IV; the latter was pointed out by a local boy and was found undisturbed.) They showed their photographs, along with copies of their inscriptions, to the Dominican scholars Marie-Joseph Lagrange and Louis-Hugues Vincent at the Convent of St. Étienne in Jerusalem. They also petitioned for the tombs' protection, appealing to the local Minister of Public Instruction in Jerusalem and the Director of the Imperial Museum at Constantinople, through the German and American consulates. As a result, the tombs were placed under protection, closed to visitors except by special permission from the authorities in Hebron, and later fitted with doors. With Peters and Thiersch's consent, Lagrange, Vincent, and a third Dominican scholar, Raphaël Savignac, then obtained permission to visit the tombs themselves and produced sketches, watercolours, and inscription copies that were used to supplement and correct the original documentation. In early September 1902, one of the two scholars returned a final time to compare their records against the Dominicans' work and resolve disputed readings, aided by E. W. Masterman and escorted by the Spanish consul, M. de Cesaris.

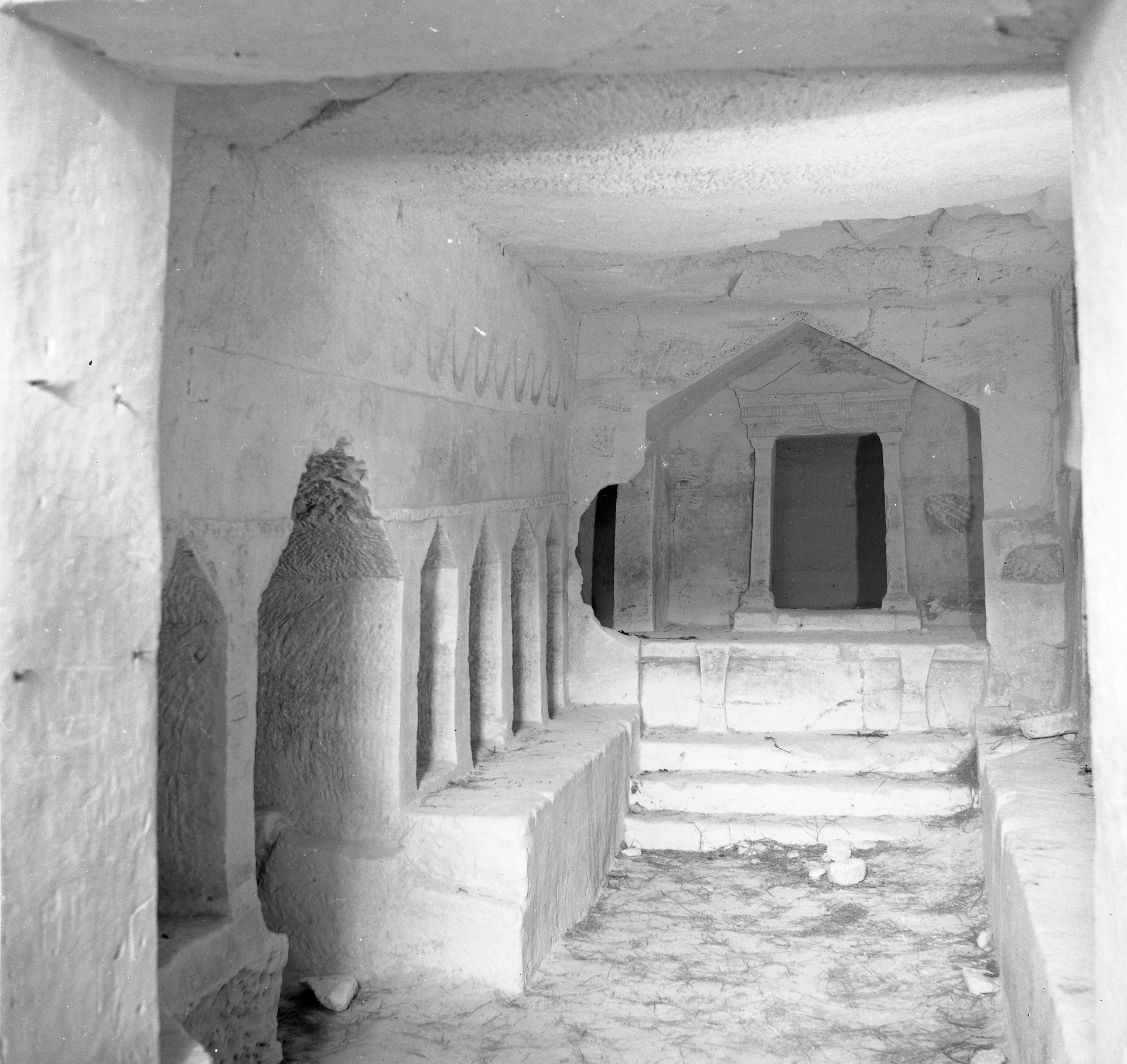
The cave in 1957

The colours of the murals faded rapidly after publication and eventually disappeared entirely. They had already largely vanished by the time William F. Albright visited the cave in the early 1920s. (Note: Albright visited the tomb in 1920 and 1921 and later recalled, in a 1942 publication, its "interesting ancient representations, which faded out, or were deliberately erased many years ago and are no longer visible at all.") The paintings visible today are the result of a 1993 restoration by the Israel Antiquities Authority, based on the early record. Raad's monochrome photographs could only partly capture what the excavators had seen, while the watercolours made by Lagrange, Savignac, and Vincent were sent, together with Raad's negatives, to the Palestine Exploration Fund and on to a lithographic printer. A 2007 study by Jacobson concluded that the published plates incorporate details drawn from the watercolours that are not visible in the photographs, casting doubt on their accuracy. (Note: An example is the head of the female harpist in the neighbouring "Musicians Cave".) Because the restored murals were applied to a panel set in front of the original surface rather than directly onto the cave walls, the underlying inscriptions currently remain largely inaccessible.

== Architecture and decoration ==
The tomb is rock-cut, and features a painted programme running through a sequence of spaces, including an entrance vestibule (Room A), two side chambers (Rooms B and C), the main burial hall (Room D) and an inner recess (niche E). The tomb was quarried on two axes: a north-south axis with the vstibule at its center opening into Rooms B and C, and an east-west axis running through Burial Hall D to a rock-cut funeral couch and, beyond it, the temple-front recess E, which gives onto sarcophagus cubicles. The dead were placed in gabled loculi (hewn burial niches, commonly known as kokhim following the Hebrew term) cut into the walls. In both its plan and its gabled loculi, the tomb closely resembles Ptolemaic-period tombs in Alexandria, particularly Hypogeum A at Shatby, which is dated c. 280–250 BCE.

The loculus tomb type first appears in the Hellenistic Southern Levant—Maresha being among its earliest examples in the region (Note: Another example, perhaps predating the Maresha tombs, is that of Khirbet Za'aquqa, also located in the Judaean Lowlands.)—and later became the standard burial form of the Roman and Byzantine periods. The origin of the type is disputed: some scholars derive it from Ptolemaic Alexandria, while others point to precedents among the elite tombs of Persian-era Phoenicia at Sidon and Arwad.

=== Entrance ===
The doorway leading from the vestibule into Burial Hall D is crowned by a wreath and flanked at an eye level by a pair of roosters. Each is shown standing on a twig and walking away from the entrance while turning its head back, as if watching those who pass. Both are drawn in black, with combs, tail feathers and branches picked out in red. The rooster's appearance, documented in other forms of funerary art, appears to help mark the threshold between the world of the living and that of the dead.

Lower on the right of the doorway is a painting of Cerberus, the three-headed hound of the Greek underworld, with one head facing the entrance and the other two turned back, a very long tail and black collars about its necks. It too reads as a guardian of the boundary of the dead. Rooms B and C carry a frieze of wavy bands touched with red and black and depicting flowers and foliage, set high above the loculi.

=== Burial Hall D and the animal frieze ===
In Burial hall D, the walls between the loculi are painted to imitate fluted Ionic columns, with reddish-brown bases and grey shafts, crowned by olive wreaths hung with ribbons. Above them runs the cave's principal frieze, which is populated by human figures, animals, and mythological creatures. It is surmounted by a wavy band like those of rooms B and C. Most of the animals are captioned in Greek.

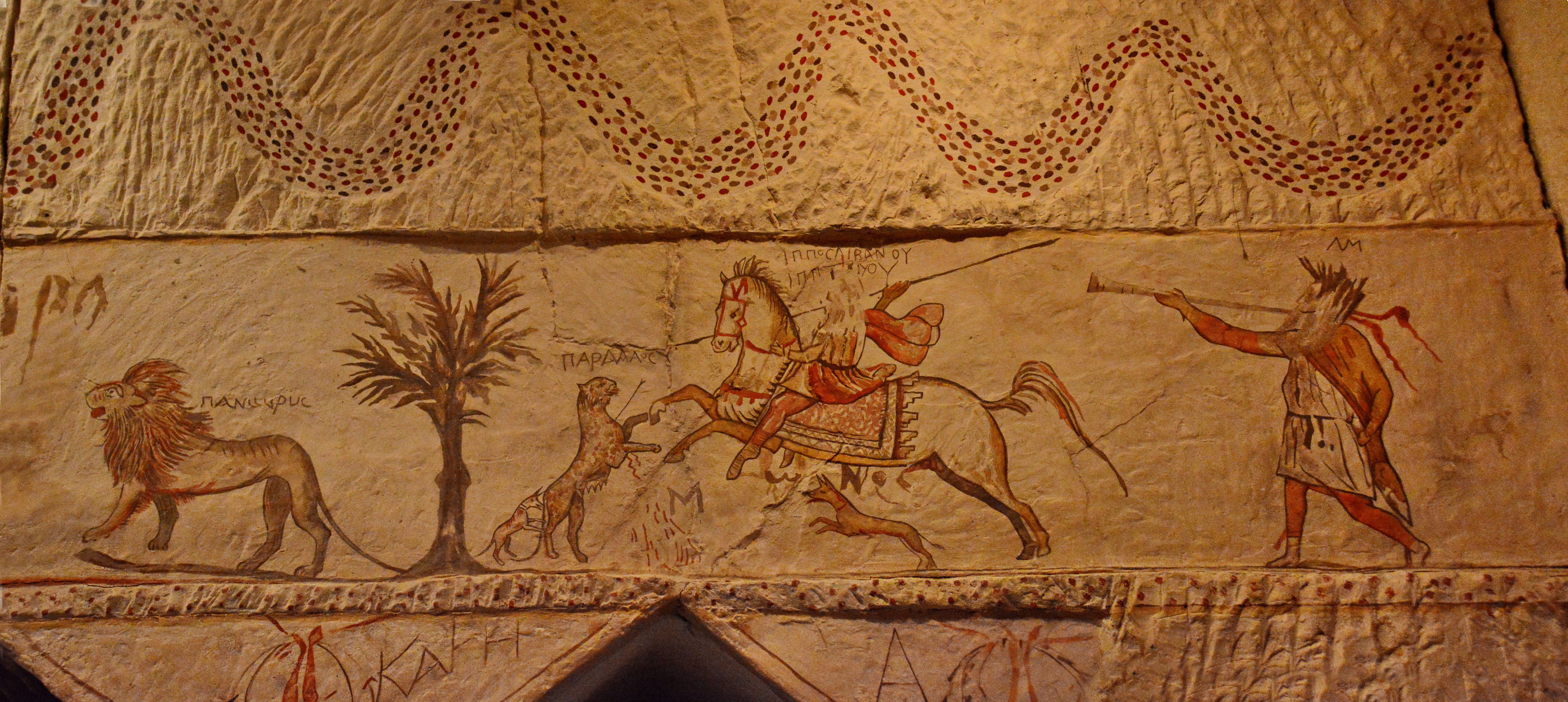
Detail of the hunting scene, showing a mounted hunter spearing a wounded leopard (centre), a youth blowing a trumpet (right), and a lion (left)

The frieze begins with a hunting scene: a youth blowing a trumpet, and a mounted hunter, his horse labelled in a phrase read as "the horse of Libanos", spearing a wounded leopard as hounds attack it. The procession that follows includes exotic African fauna: a war elephant carrying a mahout beneath a canopy, beside a figure captioned "Ethiopia" and taken as a personification of Africa; a rhinoceros, a giraffe, a hippopotamus, and a crocodile with an ibis perched on its back. These are interspersed with more familiar creatures: a leopard, a lion (incongruously captioned as "panther"), a bull, a boar, an antelope, a wild ass, a wolf, a porcupine, and a lynx. Mythological creatures appear, including a griffin (of Persian inspiration), a human-faced and bearded lion (a version of the Assyrian "lamassu"), and two composite fish bearing the features of an elephant and a rhinoceros. The giraffe is depicted crudely enough to suggest that the animal was unfamiliar in Idumaea and that its depiction reflects Egyptian influence. Its label, the Greek kamelopardalis ("camel-leopard"), has been identified as one of the earliest epigraphic attestations of the word, roughly contemporary with its appearance in the Septuagint translation of Deuteronomy.

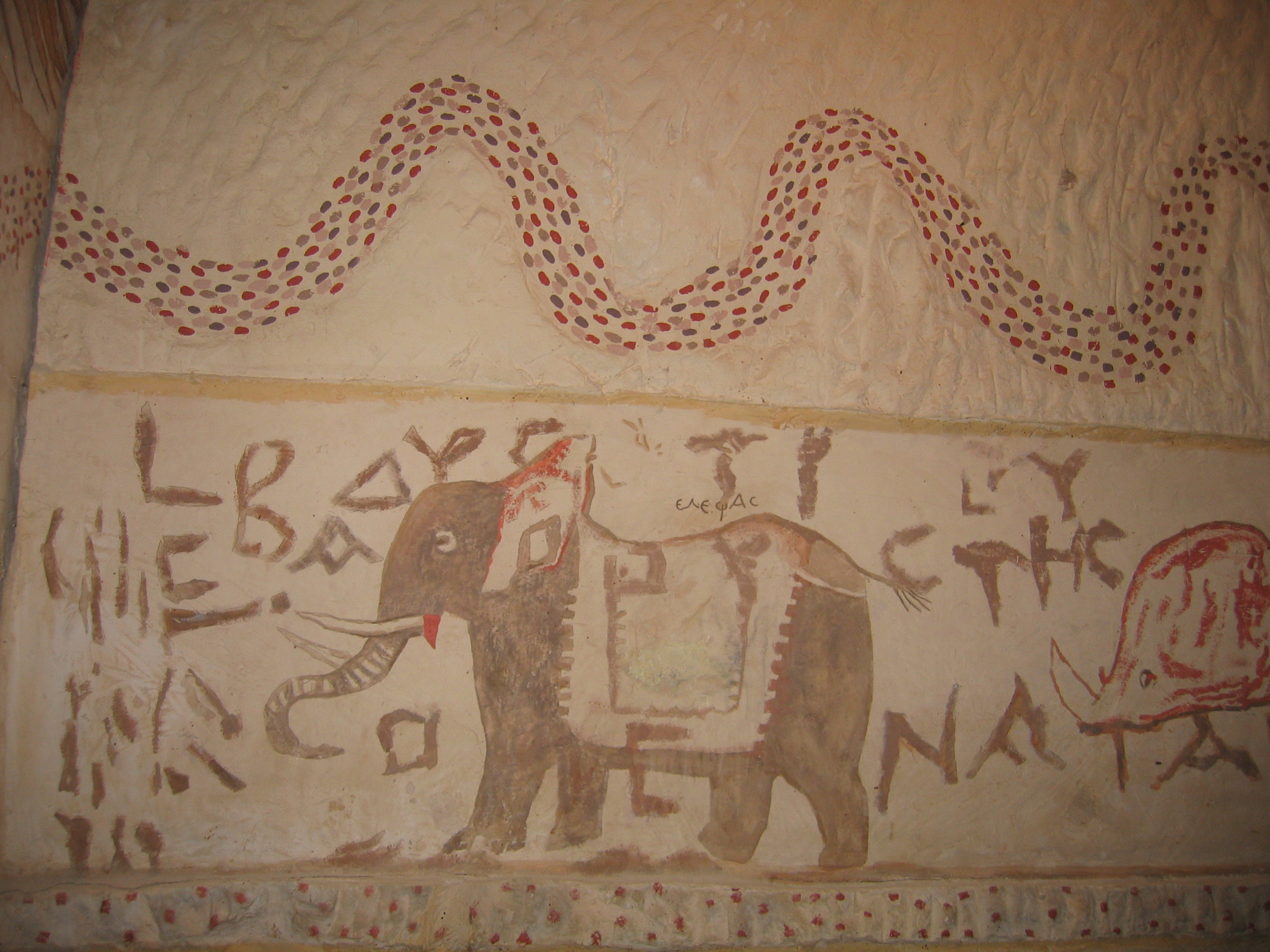
Elephant

Much of the animal imagery likely reflects the Ptolemaic fascination with fauna from lands farther south, although some species, including the leopard and the wild ass, may instead have been inspired by the local environment. Many of the exotic beasts that appear in the frieze are named in ancient accounts of the menagerie and grand procession of Ptolemy II Philadelphus. The frieze has been described as a unique survival of its kind in Hellenistic art, with its closest parallel being the later Nile mosaic of Palestrina.

=== Niche E ===
The inner recess is framed at its corners by two large eagles with outspread wings. The northern bird's wing reaches as far as the north wall of Room D. Beneath it, a red podium supports a yellow three-legged table with lion paw feet, evoking a golden tripod, and an incense burner whose legs are shaped like griffons and from which red flames rise. The damaged southern side appears to have been decorated to match.

On the inner wall, fluted pilasters flanking the doorway each carry a red disk enclosing a six petalled black flower below the capital, and the alternation of red architrave and pilasters with unpainted capitals and panels produces a scheme of red-and-white banding. The doorway is surmounted by a Doric frieze with light blue triglyphs and metopes, a cornice, and a pediment centred on a palm leaf motif with red gable edges and acroteria, and is flanked by two large amphorae (storage jars). The amphorae are identified as loutrophoroi: tall vessels used in the Hellenistic world to mark graves. They are shown with lids and with fillets tied to their handles.

== Inscriptions ==
The cave is named after the Apollophanes inscription, catalogued as no. 1 by Peters and Thiersch and as CIIP 3573. According to the 2018 CIIP translation, the inscription reads:

"Apollophanes son of Sesmaeus led the Sidonians in Marisa for thirty three years, and was considered the most worthy and the most kin-loving of all his contemporaries. He died, having lived for seventy-four years."

The inscriptions in the cave also preserve information about his family: nine relatives of Apollophanes (five men and four women) are known by name, drawn from Semitic, Nabataean, Idumaean, and Greek naming traditions. From the inscriptions, the family line can be partly reconstructed around the patriarch Sesmaeus: his children Apollophanes, his sister Sabo, and his brother Ammoius; Ammoius's son Cosnatanus, Sesmaeus's grandson; Cosnatanus's own children Babas and Babata; and Apollophanes's daughter Demetria. (Note: Gera argues that Amoiois was probably not Apollophanes' brother, instead reconstructing two individuals named Sesmaios.)

The family's names are strikingly mixed in origin. The name Apollophanes combines the Greek god Apollo with the Greek word for "appearing"; Regev notes that the name is attested in the Zenon papyri with the ethnic label Αραψ, "Arab," and adds that it was readily taken up by Idumaeans as well as by Phoenicians. His father Sesmaeus bears a Semitic name built upon the element šmš, "sun," meaning roughly "belonging to the sun (god)," and attested in 5th- and 4th-century BCE Aramaic ostraca from Maresha. Sabo's name is read as Idumaean (or Palmyrene/Nabataean); Cosnatanus is an Idumaean theophoric name invoking the Edomite god Qos alongside the Semitic word for "gave." Babas is of Idumaean or Judahite type, and Demetria, Apollophanes's daughter, bears the family's one clearly Greek female name. The name Ammoius is read by the CIIP corpus as Egyptian, though one sometimes found in Phoenician contexts, and by Regev as Nabataean. Another relative, Demetrius son of Meerbalus, couples a Greek name with a Hellenized form of the Phoenician name Maherbaal.

The tomb also preserves several other Greek inscriptions, most of which simply identify the deceased. One inscription in the vestibule describes a man named Ortas as a Macedonian. The names Protus and Straton (Greek), and Cosacabus (Idumaean) occur in the tomb or in similar forms in inscriptions referring to Idumaean soldiers from the Egyptian sites of Hermopolis Magna and Memphis. One inscription prohibits the opening of the tomb, while another combines a warning against its violation with a curse on any transgressor.

=== Verse graffito ===
A verse graffito in Greek, dating from the late 3rd to early 2nd century BCE, is scratched into the right-hand jamb of the doorway from the antechamber into Room D, directly above the figure of Cerberus. It is often read as an erotic verse spoken by a woman to a former lover: she explains that she is now with another man, though she still loves the addressee; says she is glad to be keeping his cloak as a pledge; tells him to do as he pleases; and asks him not to bang on the wall, but to signal instead at the door. Almost every aspect of the piece has been contested since its first publication — the number of speakers, the metre, even the reading itself — though most editors still take a woman to be the main speaker. Opinion is divided over whether it records an actual exchange between lovers (tombs being attested elsewhere as meeting places for lovers) or is instead a literary composition, with proposed parallels ranging from popular song to mime and New Comedy, or alternatively an existing poem on the ransom of a courtesan.

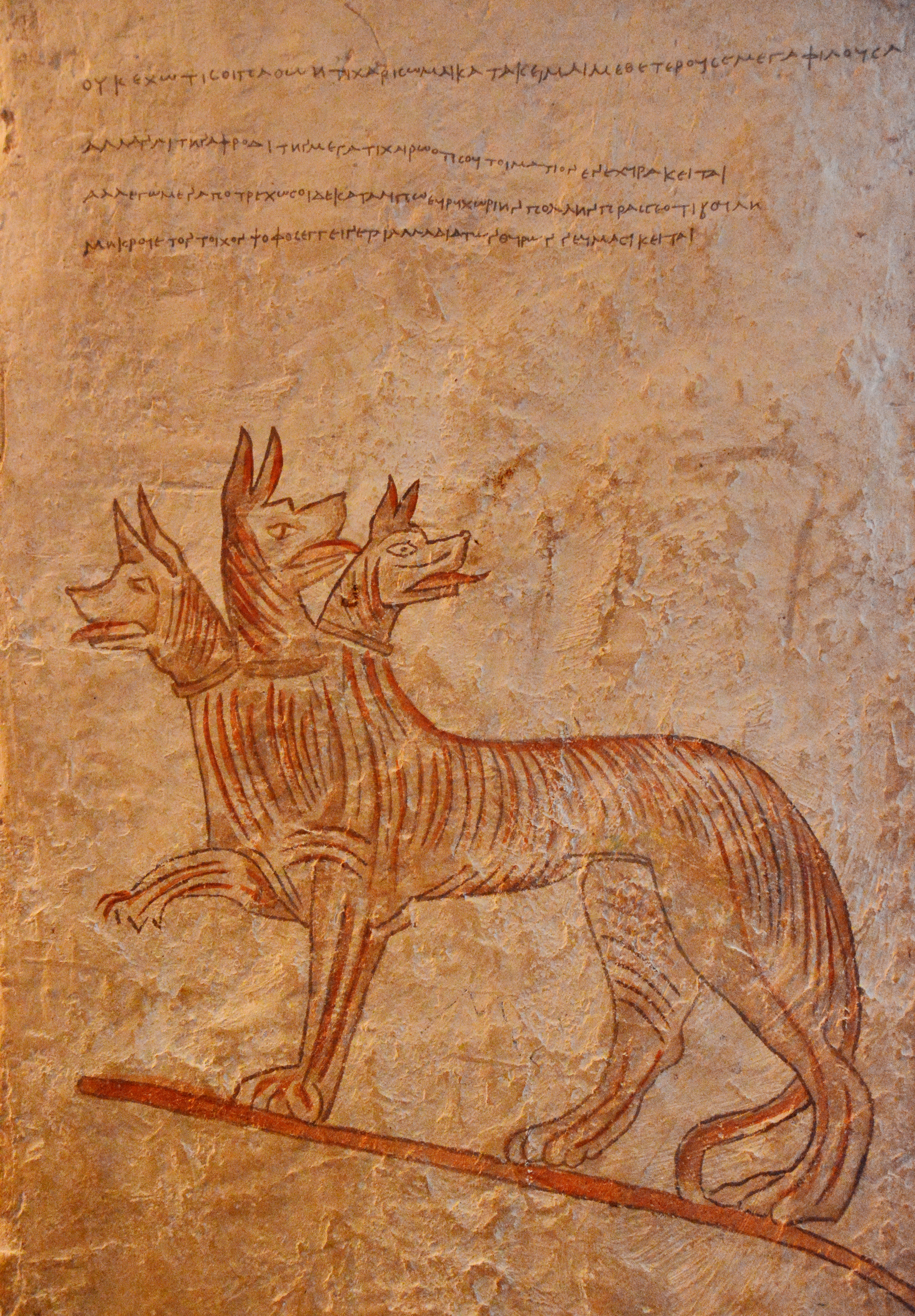
Cerberus, the three-headed dog of the Greek underworld, painted beside the tomb's doorway and below the verse graffito

On the opposite jamb, a faint and barely legible graffito names a priest, Myron, and a woman, Calypso. It has been read as arranging a secret tryst, and, on account of its position and shared vocabulary, is sometimes linked to the verse text opposite. The attribution of the verse itself to this Calypso has, however, been called unjustified.

== Dating ==
The animal frieze is conventionally dated to the 3rd century BCE. A dated inscription painted over the crocodile in the frieze provides a terminus ante quem (latest date possible): the original editors read its date as year 117 of the Seleucid era, i.e., 196/5 BCE, a reading that became widely accepted. The traditional chronology has been challenged by Dov Gera, who reread the dated inscriptions using the 1902 photographs of Raad republished by Jacobson in 2007. Gera redates the two dated inscriptions painted over the frieze—that of Apollodoros son of Zabbaios, on the north wall over the crocodile, and that of Ammonios son of Zabdada, on the south wall over the boar and giraffe—to year 171 of the Seleucid era, that is 142/141 BCE, placing the frieze in the first half of the 2nd century BCE. The CIIP corpus follows this reading.

The latest securely dated use of the tomb is the inscription of Babata, dated to Year 5, the twelfth day of the month of Ab, according to an era that may have begun with the refounding of Maresha by the Roman official Aulus Gabinius around 57 BCE. On this reckoning, Babata died around 53/52 BCE.

From the letter-forms of the epitaph itself, Gera dates the death of Apollophanes to about 200 to 160 BCE, and suggests there may have been two men named Sesmaios in the family; on his overall reckoning, the tomb was in use continuously from the 3rd century BCE down to the Parthian destruction of Maresha in 40 BCE.

== Interpretation of the "Sidonians" ==
Since its discovery, the Apollophanes inscription has been read as evidence for a resident community originating in the Phoenician port city of Sidon, often regarded as a prosperous group that formed part of Maresha's elite and helped run its political and commercial affairs. The CIIP corpus, commenting on the name Straton attested in the cave, notes that it was used in the 4th century BCE by two kings of Sidon, leading the editors to remark that its use is unsurprising in a settlement inhabited by a "Sidonian" community. Consistent with the reading, the one name in the whole Maresha onomasticon accepted even by sceptics as genuinely Phoenician, Meerbalos, a Hellenized version of Maherbaal, occurs in this very tomb. Archaeologist Amos Kloner likewise treats the Sidonians as a genuine element of Maresha's mixed population of Idumaeans, Sidonians, Greeks and Egyptians, and reads the Apollophanes family as a Sidonian family assimilating into the surrounding Idumean population; on this view its Idumaean names mark that assimilation, and its Greek names a progressive Hellenization. Dov Gera also refers to the Sidonians of Maresha as a real group.

Against this view, Dalit Regev has argued that "Sidonian" at Maresha was used as an instrumental, status-conveying label rather than an ethnic one: a kind of fictitious ethnicity, possibly carrying fiscal advantages, adopted by Idumaeans who wished for a Hellenized standing. She notes that, onomastically, Apollophanes's own family bears predominantly Idumaean and other Semitic names, and that Maresha's large Greek onomasticon of about 120 names contains no distinctively Phoenician names. Materially, she adds, Phoenician pottery is all but absent from the site, aside from a single table amphora from Cistern no. 70 and one Tanit pendant found in an unstratified fill; the many Phoenician-mint coins found there, meanwhile, are attributed to the city's role as a trade hub and to the dominance of the mint of another Phoenician city, that of Tyre, with only one or two coins of Sidon itself present. Comparatively, she points to the non-ethnic use of "Sidonians" by the Samaritans of Shechem in Josephus and in the 163 BCE inscription from Yavne-Yam, and to instrumental ethnic labels such as "Hellenes," which conferred tax status in Ptolemaic Egypt. She also notes that the two other Maresha inscriptions using the title "Sidonian" (in Tomb II) name Greek-named women who may have been slaves. Regev concludes that there is no support for a Phoenician colony or "politeuma" at Maresha, and that the Greek onomasticon instead reflects a largely Idumaean ruling class.

== See also ==
- Heliodorus stele

== Bibliography ==
=== Sources ===
- Aitken, James K. (2015). "Why is the Giraffe Kosher? Exoticism in Dietary Laws of the Second Temple Period". Biblische Notizen. 164: 21–34.
- Albright, William Foxwell (1942). "Two Cressets from Marisa and the Pillars of Jachin and Boaz". Bulletin of the American Schools of Oriental Research. 85: 18–27. doi:10.2307/1355054. JSTOR 1355054.
- Ameling, Walter; Cotton, Hannah M.; Eck, Werner; Ecker, Avner; Isaac, Benjamin; Kushnir-Stein, Alla, eds. (2018). Corpus Inscriptionum Iudaeae/Palaestinae. Vol. IV. Part 2: 3325–3978. Berlin: Walter de Gruyter. ISBN 978-3-11-054364-3.
- Ebeling, Philip; Lichtenberger, Achim; Tal, Oren (2025). "Death and Burial in the Polytheistic Communities of the Hellenistic Southern Levant". 'Atiqot. 117. doi:10.70967/2948-040X.2253.
- Gera, Dov (2017). "Some Dated Greek Inscriptions from Maresha". Palestine Exploration Quarterly. 149 (3): 201–222. doi:10.1080/00310328.2017.1310575.
- Kloner, Amos (2008). "Maresha in the Reign of Ptolemy II Philadelphus". In McKechnie, Paul; Guillaume, Philippe (eds.). Ptolemy II Philadelphus and His World. Mnemosyne Supplements. Vol. 300. Leiden: Brill. pp. 171–182.
- Peters, John Punnett; Thiersch, Hermann (1905). Painted Tombs in the Necropolis of Marissa (Marêshah). London: Committee of the Palestine Exploration Fund.
- Regev, Dalit (2023). "Sidonians at Marisa (Maresha)". 'Atiqot. 110. doi:10.70967/2948-040X.1081.
