= Nilotic landscape =

Artistic representation of Nile in Egypt

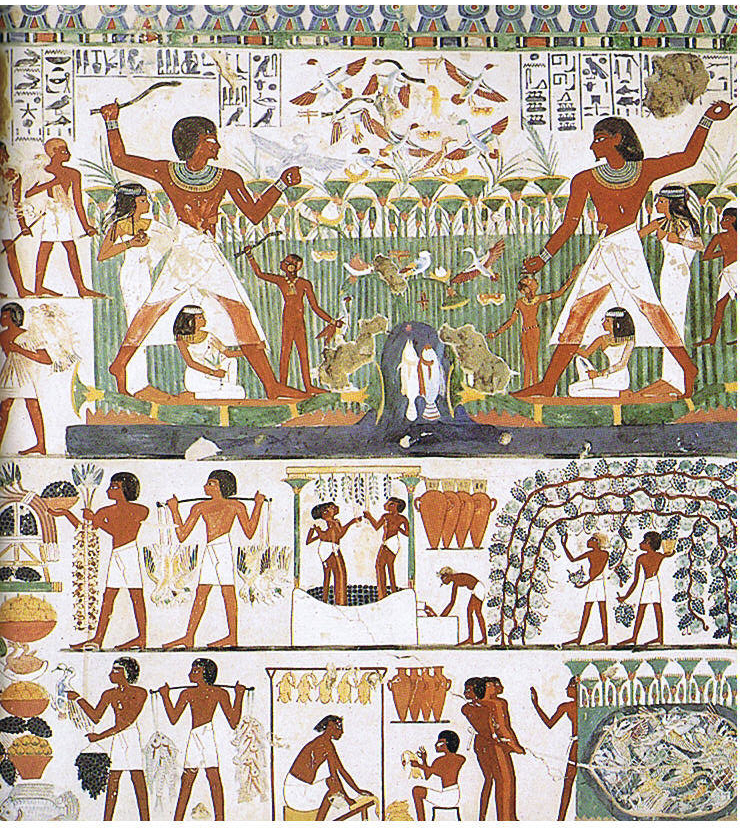
Hunting and Fishing in the marsh. Tomb of Nakht, painted plaster, first half of the 14th century BC

Nilotic landscape is any artistic representation of landscapes that emulates or is inspired by the Nile river in Egypt. The term was coined to refer primarily to such landscapes created outside of Egypt, especially in the Aegean Sea, and generally in Roman art, though it is occasionally used to refer to scenes of hunting and fishing in Egyptian art. A nilotic landscape is a river scene with rich and abundant plant and animal life, much of which is native to Egypt. Common iconographic elements include papyrus, palm trees, fish and water birds, and in some cases felines, monkeys, and/or crocodile. Imperial Roman scenes have a larger emphasis on fierce animals, usually including at least one crocodile and hippopotamus.

Archaeological evidence attests to painted depictions of the Nile in Egyptian tombs as early as the Predynastic period. Nilotic scenes remain popular throughout the Old and Middle Kingdoms, and flourish in the New Kingdom. Of particular prominence are landscapes in tomb paintings of the 18th Dynasty of Egypt. Nilotic landscapes are first adapted outside of Egypt in the Aegean, notably in Minoan art. The subject enjoys a renaissance in Hellenistic and Roman art, when nilotic scenes become a common subject for mosaics, most famously the 1st-century BC Nile mosaic of Palestrina. There were also paintings, which have much more rarely survived. These images emphasized the exoticism of the Nile, as well as its busyness as a waterway. Scenes of water traffic are depicted next to abundant and often dangerous wildlife.

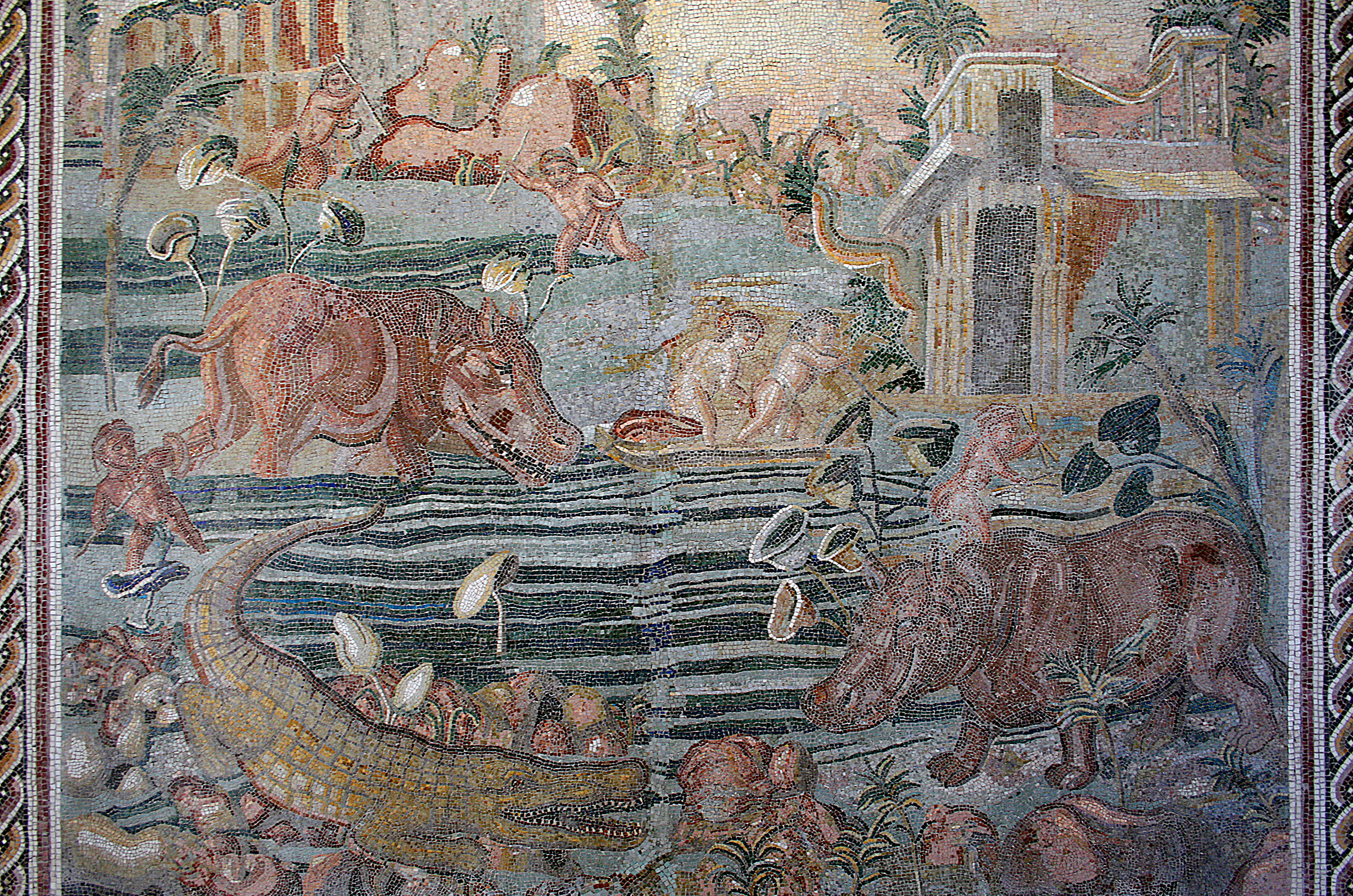
Detail of a Nilotic mosaic from Rome, about 200 AD

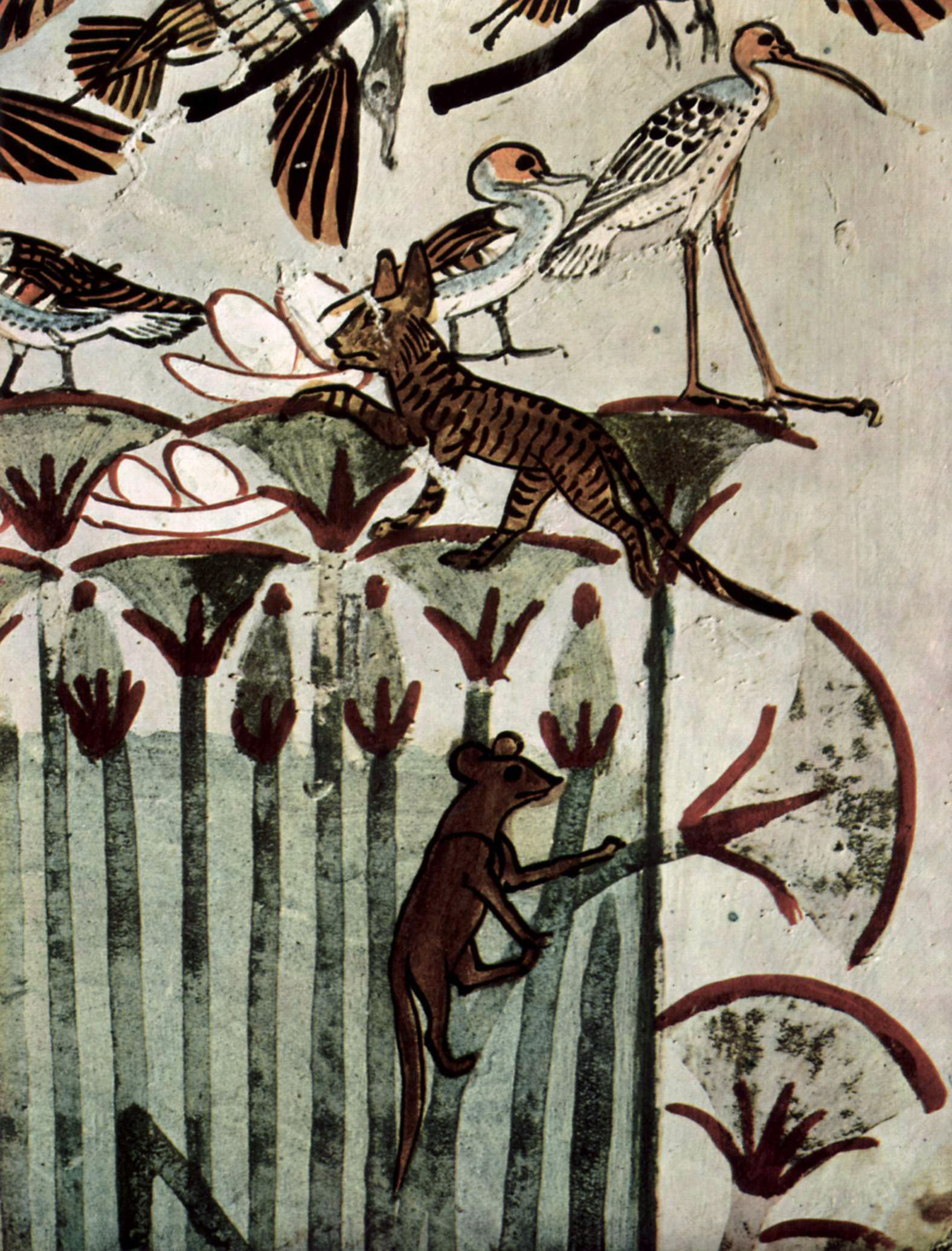
Detail of papyrus, with a cat stealing the eggs of the water birds. From the Tomb of Menna, painted plaster, first half of the 14th century BC, Thebes

The production of nilotic landscapes as well as their iconography and interpretations depend on the provenance of the work and the culture in which it was produced, but most scenes on the whole affirm and celebrate the abundance of nature.

== Iconography ==
The most important feature of a nilotic landscape is its riverine setting, which is the ultimate source of any accompanying plant and animal life. The annual flooding of the Nile river in Egypt was not only the source of the ancient civilization's food and crops, but also provided them with a dependable cyclical calendar. Much of Egypt's continuity in antiquity, both in society and in art, is thought to stem from the people's relationship to the Nile.

Nilotic landscapes are filled with abundant plant and animal life. Blue and green pigments often dominate the scene. The papyrus plant and palm trees are the most recognizable botanic features of a nilotic landscape, along with other plants, often carefully depicted and identifiable. Various animals are represented and vary depending on the specific scene. Many varieties of fish and water birds are found in the scenes, and hunting and fishing scenes usually include cats. Other nilotic landscapes, especially those outside of Egypt, include exotic, foreign animals, such as monkeys and crocodiles, and often fantastic creatures or monsters like griffins and sphinxes.

== Nilotic landscapes in Egypt ==
The phrase "nilotic landscape" is used in Egyptian studies to describe the scenes in tomb paintings where the deceased is engaged in hunting and fishing. These scenes stress the elite character and importance of the deceased, who conquers nature and dominates the landscape, participating in activities reserved for the upper class. Many scenes are symmetrical, with the image of the deceased repeated, first engaged in the act of hunting birds and then spearing fish. The birds and fish often appear in large numbers. They are easily captured by the deceased as they appear to literally fly around him or swim right up to his spear. Thus, man is shown in a position of control over nature and the natural world as subservient to his own existence.

Though these scenes have a centuries-old tradition, they become increasingly popular in the 18th Dynasty of the New Kingdom, with prominent examples of these scenes discovered in tombs from the necropolis of ancient Thebes in the Valley of the Kings. Artistically, the scenes are characterized by a sense of movement and liveliness not normally seen in most Egyptian works, which for centuries portrayed static, stoic figures and creatures. There is ample attention paid to detail discernible in the realistic rendering of individual plant and animal species. Variety is imparted by means of these careful details and individualized characterizations.

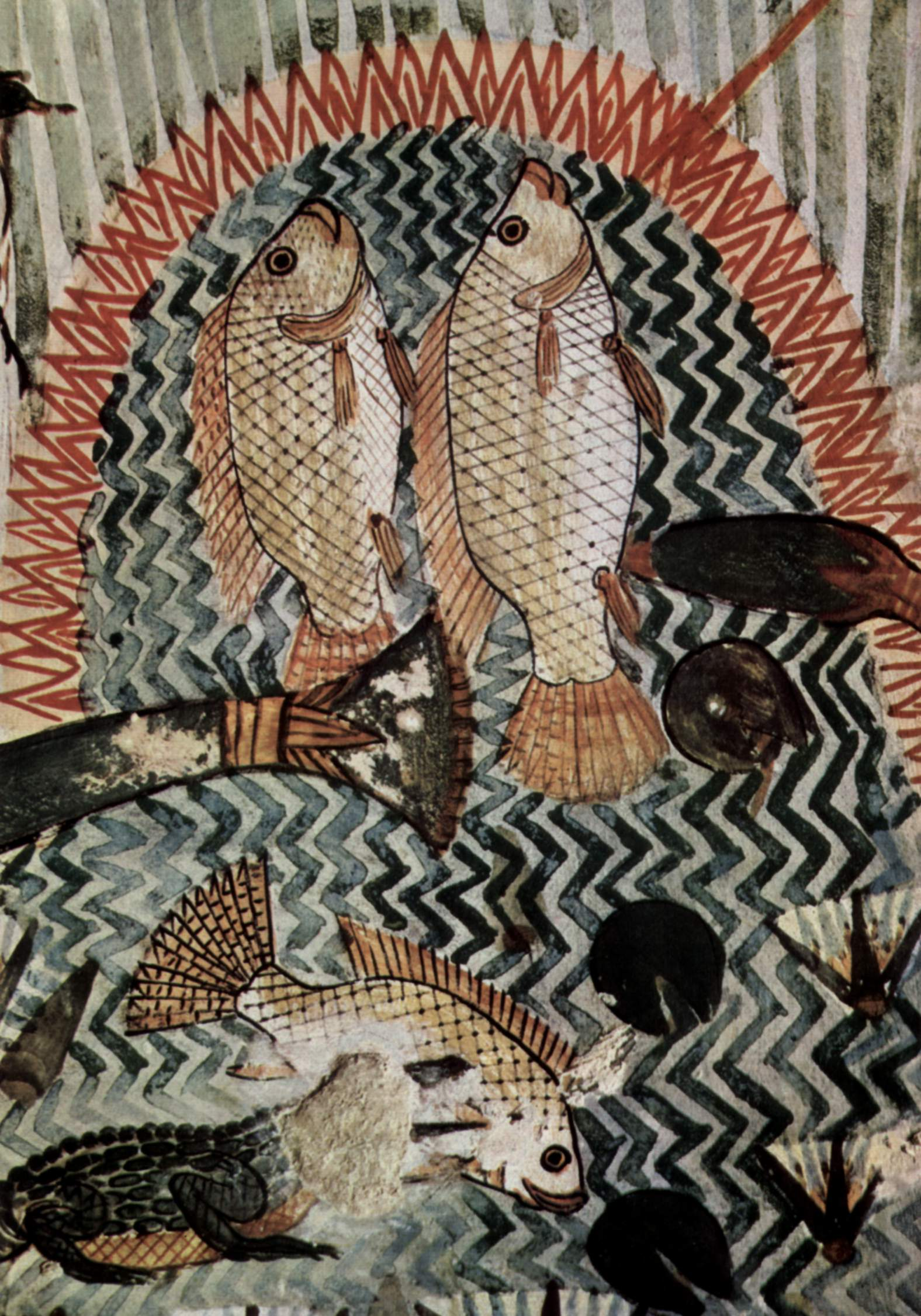
Detail of Fish Swimming into Menna's spear. From the Tomb of Menna, painted plaster, first half of the 14th century BC, Thebes

== Nilotic landscapes in the Aegean ==
River scenes suggesting the natural world and its lush vegetation begin to appear outside of Egypt contemporaneously with the 18th Dynasty, the first extant evidence coming from fresco fragments of the Minoans. The Aegean version of the nilotic landscape retains many key iconographic elements of the Egyptian version, but the Minoans often make the landscape itself the subject, emphasizing plants and wildlife over human figures (which are generally left out of the work). The compositions are characteristic of the Minoan artistic style, more irregular and informal. Attention is paid to detail and color with respect to plants and animals, but precisely drawn patterns seldom arise and the background and setting may be highly imaginative. They are true frescoes, painted on wet plaster so that the color chemically adheres to the surface, unlike the Egyptian versions.

Nilotic landscapes in Minoan art are evidence of contact between the Minoans and the Egyptians, both through trade and the exchange of ideas. Plants like papyrus and animals like monkeys were not native to Crete. Many of the plant and animal species are identifiable, confirming not only that the artists paid close attention to detail, but also that they must have been familiar with these species, either through examination of Egyptian painting or, as seems more likely, by means of direct contact with these creatures, plants, and Egyptian culture.

At the "House of the Frescoes", located near the Minoan palace at Knossos, fresco fragments were unearthed depicting blue monkeys and blue birds in a rocky landscape with a winding blue river, along with various types of plants, including papyrus. This scene has been dubbed a “nilotic landscape” by archaeologists and art historians due to its inclusion of blue monkeys and papyrus in a riverine setting.

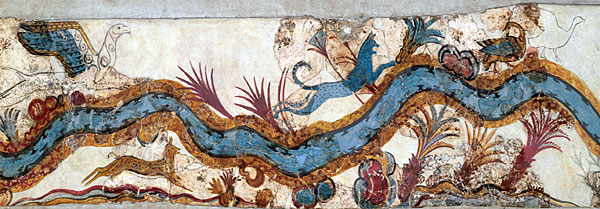
Detail of nilotic landscape from Thera, riverine scene with panther chasing ducks

Excavations at Akrotiri on the island of Thera have preserved a number of frescoes dating to the Late Bronze Age. One such scene from the "West House" on the east wall of Room 5 has been termed a nilotic landscape. It features a mix of real and imaginary creatures. A griffin flies over the meandering river, a wild cat stalks ducks, and palm trees pervade. Unlike the two other fresco scenes in this room, the nilotic landscape is devoid of human figures and lacks narrative, focusing instead on the wildlife and environment and glorifying the natural world. The absence of human figures in these Minoan nilotic landscapes has led many archaeologists to assume the presence of a nature goddess or divinity in Minoan religion.

== Later art ==
A number of biblical subjects in art, such as the Finding of Moses, are set in Egypt, and Christian artists slowly evolved modest conventions for conveying the unfamiliar landscape. The process accelerated after the Renaissance, with Nicolas Poussin, who painted many subjects on the life of Moses, a particular pioneer in developing a more authentic decor. But the process was slow until the start of the 19th century, with increased Western travel, the advent of modern Egyptology, and in art the development of Orientalism. By the late 19th-century exotic and carefully studied or researched decor was often dominant in depictions of both landscape and human figures, whether ancient or modern.
