= Heliodorus stele =

2nd-century BCE Greek inscription from Maresha, Israel

- The reconstructed Heliodorus stele at the Israel Museum
- Type: Stele
- Material: Hebron limestone
- Height: 110 centimetres (43 in)
- Width: 57.5 centimetres (22.6 in)
- Depth: 12.9 centimetres (5.1 in)–16.2 centimetres (6.4 in)
- Writing: Koine Greek
- Created: 178 BCE
- Discovered: 2005–2006; Subterranean complex no. 57, Maresha, Israel
- Discovered by: Ian Stern and Bernie Alpert (excavated fragments)
- Present location: Israel Museum, Jerusalem
- Identification: 2006-52/1; 2009-1488/1-3
- Culture: Hellenistic (Seleucid)

The Heliodorus stele is an inscribed Hellenistic-era stone block discovered in Maresha, Israel. Dating to 178 BCE, the inscription contains a dossier of three Greek documents, including a royal ordinance issued by King Seleucus IV of the Seleucid Empire to his chief minister, Heliodorus, and two letters passing the edict down the administrative chain of command. The primary subject is the appointment of an individual named Olympiodorus to a religious-administrative position over the sanctuaries throughout the Seleucid satrapy (province) of Coele-Syria and Phoenicia.

This appointment likely aimed to strengthen royal oversight of temple revenues, enabling the Seleucid Empire to meet the heavy financial reparations owed to the Roman Republic following the Treaty of Apamea (188 BCE). The final installment of 12,000 talents owed to Rome under the treaty was due in 177 BCE, the year after the inscription was drafted, and the appointment may have been timed to extract revenue from provincial sanctuaries to help meet this obligation.

The stele provides background for the "Heliodorus affair" described in 2 Maccabees 3, which recounts an attempt by Heliodorus to confiscate the treasuries of the Temple in Jerusalem. While the inscription confirms Heliodorus as a genuine historical figure, it identifies Olympiodorus—not Heliodorus—as the official tasked with overseeing the temples. Scholars have proposed two theories to resolve this discrepancy. One suggests that Olympiodorus's oversight sparked such significant local tension that it required the direct intervention of Heliodorus himself. Alternatively, the author of 2 Maccabees may have simply substituted Olympiodorus with the more famous chief minister Heliodorus. The latter later also became notorious as the assassin of the king, making him a more suitable villain.

In any case, the inscription provides evidence of a policy shift within the Seleucid Empire concerning its intervention and fiscal involvement in the sanctuaries under its rule. This shift triggered a decline in relations between the Jews of Judea and the Seleucid authorities, creating a tension that reached its nadir under King Antiochus IV Epiphanes, whose anti-Jewish edicts and desecration of the Jerusalem Temple eventually ignited the Maccabean Revolt in 167 BCE.

== Discovery ==
The Heliodorus stele was reconstructed in stages between 2005 and 2006 from five fragments, combining pieces recovered through formal excavations with others that surfaced on the antiquities market. The stele's provenance is derived from two different sources: fragments A and B emerged through the illegal antiquities trade, while fragments C, D, and E were recovered in situ during licensed excavations at subterranean complex no. 57 in the lower city of Maresha, a town in classical Idumaea, south of Judea.

The first fragment came to light in 2005, when Ian Stern and Bernie Alpert, leading a licensed excavation at the site, discovered Fragment D in Room 1 of subterranean complex no. 57. The following year, fragments A and B were brought to the Israel Antiquities Authority (IAA) for examination after appearing on the antiquities market. Laboratory analysis by Yuval Goren, testing soil composition, patination, and chalk sediments, independently indicated that both pieces originated from the underground caves of the Maresha area, establishing a link to the excavation site. Shortly afterward, also in 2006, fragments C and E were uncovered in the same room where Fragment D had been found two years earlier. Once all five pieces were assembled, it became clear that fragments C and D joined perfectly with the bottom of fragments A and B.

The reconstructed stele, with labels marking the five fragments recovered from the antiquities market and the Maresha excavation

Epigraphist Dov Gera suggested that the stele was originally displayed in a prominent sanctuary at Maresha, possibly a temple of Apollo, the tutelary deity of the Seleucid dynasty. The existence of such a cult at the site is supported by a votive offering found on Maresha's acropolis, which archaeologist Clermont-Ganneau restored as a dedication to Apollo. Gera proposed that the stele was removed to Subterranean Complex no. 57 around 113/112 BCE, when Maresha fell to John Hyrcanus, the Jewish leader of Hasmonean Judea, in what may have been a deliberate removal of symbols of Seleucid sovereignty and pagan imagery from the town's public spaces.

Today, the reconstructed stele is housed in the Israel Museum in Jerusalem, with the catalogue numbers 2006-52/1 and 2009-1488/1-3.

== Description ==
The stele is carved from Hebron limestone. The upper part is gabled and features a pediment decorated with a red-painted rosette. Above this, there are three acroteria: one positioned in the center and two on the edges.

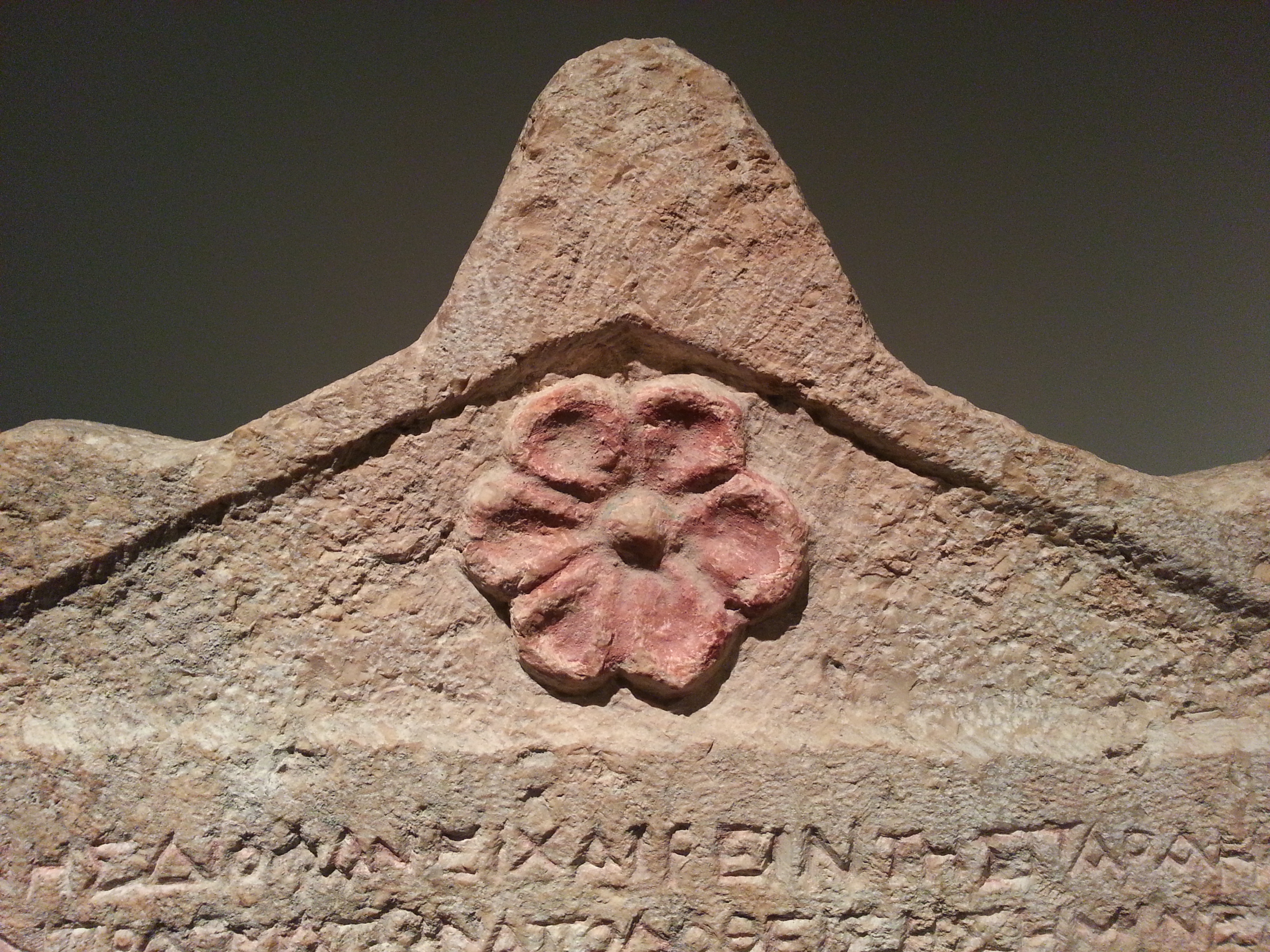
Upper part of the stele, showing the red-painted rosette, three acroteria, and the beginning of the inscription

The main body of the stele (comprising fragments A, B, C, and D) measures 110 cm (43 in) in height, 57.5 cm (22.6 in) in width, and between 12.9 and 16.2 cm (5.1 and 6.4 in) in depth. A fifth fragment (E) measures 37 by 22 cm (14.6 by 8.7 in). The Greek text was carved by a single stonemason. Before the inscription was cut, the surface of the stele was prepared by chiselling with an eight-toothed tool. The letters in the upper portion of the stele are larger, measuring 1.4 cm in height, compared to those in the lower portion, which measure 1.1 cm. The symbol L stands for "year" (ἔτους), a convention that originated in Ptolemaic Egyptian scribal tradition. Traces of red paint, commonly used to highlight characters, were found on all fragments.

The two cover letters are both dated to Year 134 of the Seleucid era, month of Gorpiaios, corresponding to summer 178 BCE. The letter from Dorymenes to Diophanes is dated to the 22nd, and that from Heliodorus to Dorymenes to the 23rd. This creates a chronological anomaly, since the letter from the superior (Heliodorus) should predate the forwarding letter from the subordinate (Dorymenes). Cotton, Wörrle, and Gera all attribute this to a stonecutter's error.

A scribal anomaly occurs in line 36 of the king's letter, where the engraver carved θεωυν, a hybrid form combining the genitive plural θεῶν ("of the gods") with the singular θεοῦ ("of the god"). Gera suggested that this may reflect the fact that the king's letter, intended for publication in a religiously diverse region, included an alternative singular reading for its monotheistic Jewish and Samaritan populations. The stonecutter, copying from a papyrus that contained both variants, may have accidentally conflated them.

== Content ==
=== Structure and chain of command ===
The inscription includes three documents arranged in reversed chronology. The first is a letter from Dorymenes, the strategos (governor) of the entire satrapy (province) of Coele-Syria and Phoenicia, to Diophanes, whom Gera identified as the meridarches (district governor) of Idumaea, the administrative district that included Maresha. The second is from Heliodorus, the prime minister (originally, ὁ ἐπὶ τῶν πραγμάτων, 'the one in charge of affairs'), to Dorymenes. The last is a royal edict, or prostagma, from King Seleucus IV Philopator to Heliodorus.

Through this structure, the inscription reveals the full chain of command in the Seleucid Empire: the King at the top, followed by the chief minister, the provincial governor, and finally the local district official. This structure parallels earlier Seleucid dossiers concerning high priestly appointments under Antiochus III, including those from Pamukçu in Mysia, Akşehir in Phrygia, Nahavand and Kermanshah in Iran, and Dodurga in Caria. In each case, a royal prostagma (decree) was forwarded down a chain consisting of the king's chief minister (or viceroy), then the provincial governor, or strategos, and finally, a local district official (hyparchos or meridarches). Among these dossiers is an ordinance from Antiochus III dating to 209 BCE, appointing a certain Nicanor as the high priest of sanctuaries across Asia Minor, which survived in two copies in Mysia and Phrygia. Nicanor's career closely parallels that of Olympiodorus: both were foster-brothers of the king, both served as chamberlain as their first post, and both were elevated to the Friends. Gera speculates that Olympiodorus may have been Nicanor's son, since Seleucid courtiers often retraced the careers of their fathers.

It is possible that the Dorymenes of the inscription is the father of Ptolemaios, son of Dorymenes, who appears in 1 and 2 Maccabees as governor of the satrapy under Antiochus IV around 165 BCE. If so, this could be evidence for continuity of personnel in the royal courts of Seleucus IV and his brother and successor Antiochus IV.

The text also confirms the use of "brother" as a formal way for the king and his ministers to address one another. This style of address appears in the Books of Maccabees and was previously dismissed as a literary invention; however, thanks to the inscription, it was confirmed as an actual court custom. This form of address did not necessarily reflect age parity: Antiochus V Eupator, a boy-king of nine, addressed his chief minister Lysias as "brother" in a letter that appears in 2 Maccabees 11:22, and Heliodorus could likewise address the older Dorymenes as "brother" because of his superior rank.

=== Olympiodorus ===
At the center of the stele is the appointment of an individual named Olympiodorus. According to the inscription, he had been raised alongside the future king as his syntrophos (foster-brother), suggesting that his father was likely one of the philoi ("Friends") of Antiochus III. He first served as chamberlain and was later elevated to the rank of "First Friend". This represents the earliest known attestation of the rank "First Friend" in the Seleucid court, predating the previously earliest reference to Nicanor son of Patroclus under Antiochus IV in 165 BCE, as attested in 2 Maccabees 8:9.

According to the inscription, he was appointed to a religious-administrative position over all the temples in the satrapy of Coele Syria and Phoenicia. The precise title is not preserved. Cotton, Wörrle proposed the low ranking position of official "in charge of the temples". Gera argued that the position was that of High Priest (archiereus) of the satrapy, drawing on three lines of evidence. He noted the close parallel between Olympiodorus's career and that of Nicanor, who was appointed archiereus of cis-Tauric Asia Minor by Antiochus III in 209 BCE. He also observed the similarity between the language Seleucus IV uses to justify the appointment and that used by Antiochus III. Finally, he referred to the appearance of the formula "in the contracts", which is used specifically in documents recording Seleucid high priestly appointments.

This appointment was intended to strengthen royal oversight of temple revenues, likely driven by the Seleucid Empire's need to pay heavy reparations to the Roman Republic following the Treaty of Apamea, the 188 BCE peace agreement signed after the Seleucid defeat in the Roman–Seleucid war. The final installment of 12,000 talents owed to Rome under the treaty was due in 177 BCE, the year after the inscription was drafted, and the appointment may have been timed to extract revenue from provincial sanctuaries to help meet this obligation.

The letter contrasts Seleucus IV's care for sanctuaries in the other satrapies, "from the very start" of his reign, as he states, with the alleged neglect of temples in Coele Syria and Phoenicia. This contrast could be propagandistic rather than factual, since independent evidence, including the statement in 2 Maccabees 3 that Seleucus funded sacrifices at the Jerusalem Temple from his own revenues, shows the satrapy's sanctuaries were not entirely neglected during the earlier part of this reign. The king's rhetoric was designed to justify the appointment by exaggerating the need for reform.

=== Copies ===
Other copies of this royal ordinance exist: one from elsewhere in Maresha and another seemingly from the Phoenician city of Byblos in modern-day Lebanon. However, these are only partial; the Heliodorus Stele remains the most complete copy of the ordinance.

Another copy of the inscription was rediscovered in 2013 by historian Werner Eck in the IAA warehouse at Beth Shemesh, where it was identified as a duplicate of a known Seleucid decree. It had originally been discovered in 1954 by Avshalom Ya'acobi near Maresha/Beit Guvrin and later transferred to the state's antiquities collection, where it remained largely unstudied. Since this is the second copy discovered at Maresha, it indicates that multiple versions of the same royal ordinance were displayed in the city.

== Connection to 2 Maccabees 3 ==
The inscription provides historical background for a narrative in 2 Maccabees, Chapter 3. It is an independent witness to an event leading up to the Maccabean Revolt in Judea that was otherwise attested only in that book. In that chapter, a Seleucid official named Heliodorus is described as a minister sent by Seleucus IV to confiscate funds from the Temple in Jerusalem, an attempt that was miraculously thwarted by divine intervention, through a horseman and two youths. The inscription confirms Heliodorus as a historical figure and describes him as holding a central position in the Seleucid apparatus.

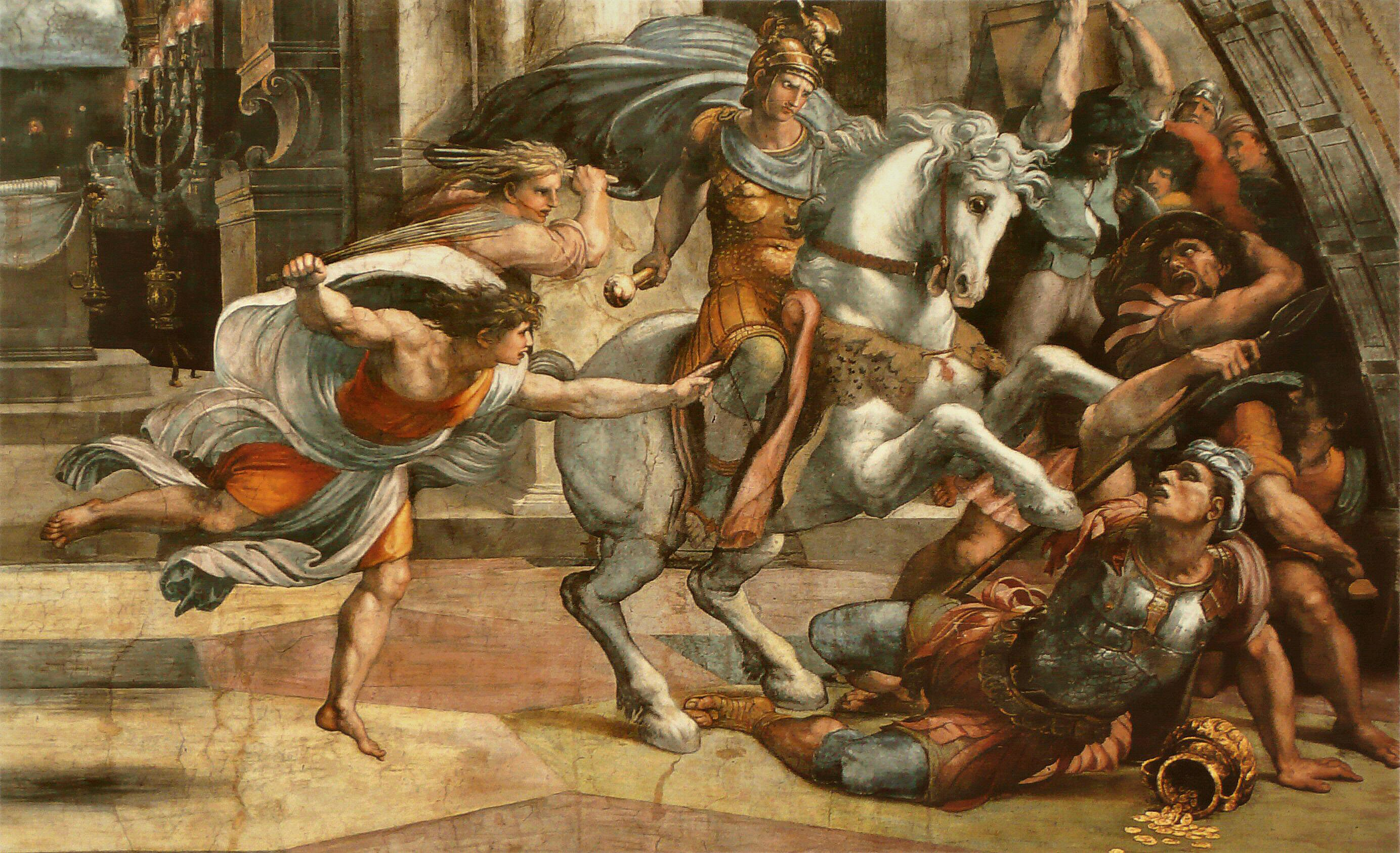
Heliodorus chased from the Jerusalem Temple: 1511 depiction of the "Heliodorus affair" in 2 Maccabees by Raphael, Vatican Museums

More than anything, the mention of a Seleucid official appointed over temples throughout the entire Coele-Syria and Phoenicia region, which included the region of Judea, and in it, the Jerusalem Temple, lends historicity to the account in 2 Maccabees. It serves as the historical context for Heliodorus's attempted confiscation of Temple funds. However, while 2 Maccabees identifies Heliodorus as the one who attempted to seize the temple treasures, the inscription identifies Heliodorus as the chief minister and Olympiodorus as the official appointed over the temples.

There are two primary theories to resolve this discrepancy. The first suggests an escalation: the appointment of Olympiodorus to oversee the temples created tensions between the Jews and the Seleucid authorities, which required a direct expedition by Heliodorus himself. The second option is that Olympiodorus was the official who challenged the Jewish priesthood in Jerusalem, but the author of 2 Maccabees replaced him with the more famous figure of Heliodorus, whose name carries a similar sound. A Seleucid high priest exercising authority over the Jerusalem Temple would have been theologically unacceptable to Jewish readers, since the high priesthood was understood as divinely bestowed upon Aaron and his descendants. Moreover, Olympiodorus's middling rank would have made him a less compelling antagonist than the kingdom's chief minister. Heliodorus also became notorious as the assassin of Seleucus IV, making him a more fitting villain.

The inscription provides evidence of the diminishing privileges previously granted by Antiochus III to the Jews of Judea, which had included an autonomous governance according to ancestral laws, and financial support for the Jerusalem Temple. Under this policy, the strategos and high priest Ptolemaios son of Thraseas had administered royal support for the Jerusalem Temple, including subsidies for sacrificial animals, wine, oil, frankincense, as well as donations in kind and tax exemptions for temple functionaries, all documented in royal prostagmata preserved by Josephus in Antiquities of the Jews 12.138–144. It is clear that the appointment of a Seleucid overseer over the temples was a departure from this arrangement that also reduced the autonomy of the Jerusalem priesthood. This act may represent the early stages of a policy shift under Seleucus IV, that triggered the decline in relations between the Jewish population and the Seleucid authorities. This decline reached its lowest point under King Antiochus IV Epiphanes, whose desecration of the Temple, confiscation of its funds, and subsequent anti-Jewish persecutions, ultimately sparked the Maccabean Revolt.

== See also ==
- Apollophanes Cave
- Seleucid Empire#Economy

== Bibliography ==
=== Sources ===
- Ameling, Walter; Cotton, Hannah M.; Eck, Werner; Ecker, Avner; Isaac, Benjamin; Kushnir-Stein, Alla, eds. (2018). Corpus Inscriptionum Iudaeae / Palaaestinae. Vol. IV: Iudaea / Idumaea. Part 2: 3325–3978. Berlin: Walter de Gruyter. ISBN 978-3-11-054364-3.
- Cotton, Hannah M.; Wörrle, Michael (2007). "Seleukos IV to Heliodoros: A New Dossier of Royal Correspondence from Israel". Zeitschrift für Papyrologie und Epigraphik. 159: 191–205. ISSN 0084-5388. JSTOR 20191205.
- Gera, Dov (2009). "Heliodoros, Olympiodoros, and the Temples of Koilê Syria and Phoinikê". Zeitschrift für Papyrologie und Epigraphik. 169: 125–155. ISSN 0084-5388. JSTOR 20756676.
- Gera, Dov (2018). "3511. Ordinance of Seleucus IV Philopator concerning Olympiodorus, 178 BC". In Ameling, Walter; Cotton, Hannah M.; Eck, Werner; Ecker, Avner (eds.). Volume 4/Part 2: Iudaea / Idumaea: 3325-3978. Corpus Inscriptionum Iudaeae/Palaestinae. Berlin: De Gruyter. pp. 956–967. doi:10.1515/9783110544930. ISBN 9783110543643.
