= Postage stamps and postal history of Israel and Palestine =

Postage stamps and postal history of Israel and Palestine refers to either:

- Postage stamps and postal history of Israel
- Postage stamps and postal history of Palestine
