= Postage stamps and postal history of Israel =

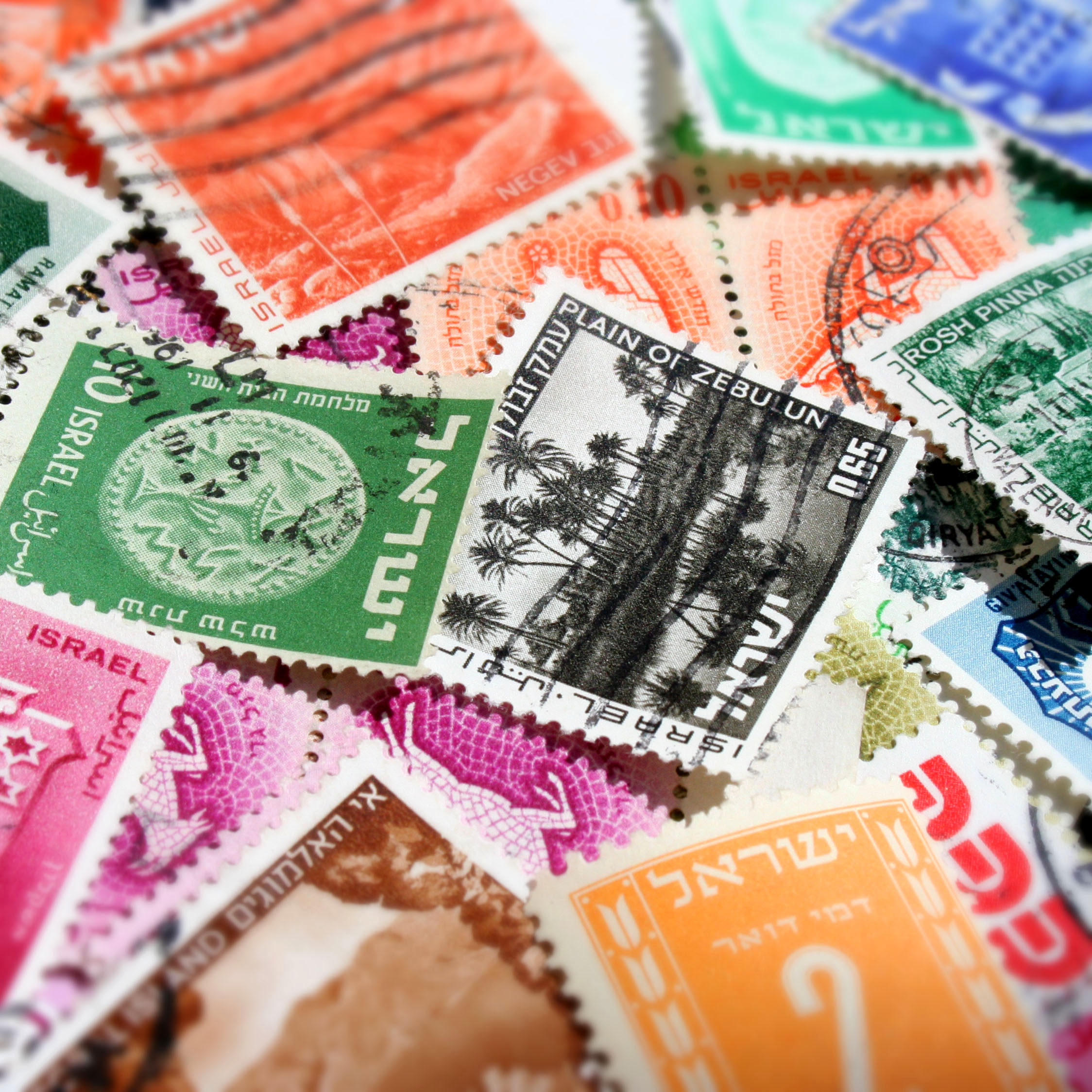
The first stamps of Israel

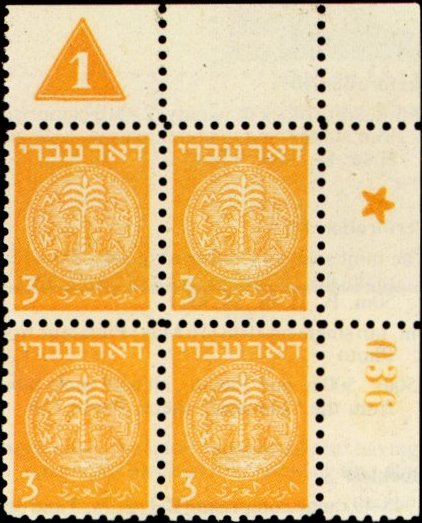
A block of four of the 1948 3 mils value from the first series of Israeli stamps

The postage stamps and postal history of Israel is a survey of the postage stamps issued by the state of Israel, and its postal history, since independence was proclaimed on May 14, 1948. The first postage stamps were issued two days later on May 16, 1948. Pre-1948 postal history is discussed in postage stamps and postal history of Palestine.

== Historical context ==
The postal history of Israel builds upon the centuries-long development of postal services in Palestine. During the rule of the Mamluks, mounted mail service was operated in Deir al-Balah, Lydda and other towns on the Cairo to Damascus route. During the Ottoman period, postal services relied upon Turkey's stamps. Foreign consulates set up the early post offices. During World War I, the British Egyptian Expeditionary Force occupied Palestine and demarcated stamps as "E.E.F." in 1918.

During the British Mandate, postage stamps and services were provided by British authorities. At first using temporary stamps issued in February 1918 by the British Expeditionary Forces in Palestine, and in February 1920 issuing permanent stamps bearing the imprint: "Palestine Eretz Israel". From 1933 to 1948, mandate services included airmail stamps and, as an innovation, air letter cards.

In April 1948, the British discontinued all postal services, and post offices and operations were, in part, turned over to the Israeli government. In May 1948, as the British withdrew and postal services broke down, the provisional government issued overprints on Jewish National Fund stamps and ad hoc postage was created in Nahariya and Safed.

== Postal history ==
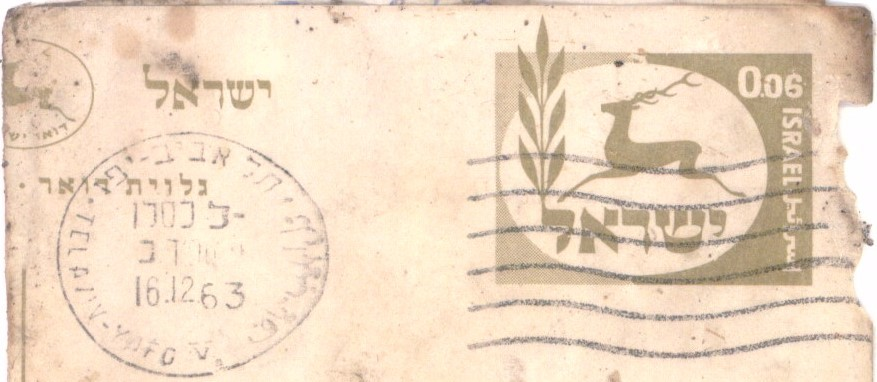
Imprinted stamp for 6 ag. on a postal card from 1963, showing the old logo (1949–2006) of Israel Post

Stamps have been issued by Israel Post, the Israeli postal operator, since Sunday, 16 May 1948, the first business day after Israel declared independence, Saturday being a day of rest. The first set of stamps was entitled Doar Ivri ("Hebrew Post") because the country's name had not yet been chosen. The first set of definitive stamps included values of 3, 5, 10, 15, 20, 50, 250, 500, and 1000 mils. The stamps were printed by letterpress, perforated or as a rouletted variation, and with Israel's emblematic "tabs" with marginalia about the stamp. Stamp booklets were issued for the 5, 10, 15 and 20 mil stamps. The Doar Ivri stamps were designed by Otte Wallish using ancient coins from the First Jewish–Roman War and later Bar Kokhba revolt (as pictured at top of article).

Israeli stamps are trilingual, in Arabic, English and Hebrew, following the practice of the British Mandate of Palestine (as required by the League of Nations). Israel Post first issued postage due stamps, tête-bêche and gutter pairs in 1948, airmail stamps in 1950, service stamps, for government offices, in 1951 and provisional stamps in 1960. The tabs have gone through three unofficial phases. From 1948 to 1954, the tabs were written in Hebrew (with four exceptions: the Maccabia, Israel Bonds, Zionist Congress and Z.O.A. stamps). From 1954 until 1967, the inscriptions were usually in Hebrew and French. Since 1967, the tabs are typically Hebrew and English. Rarely, a tab is matched with the wrong stamp, as with two mix-ups on some Doar Ivri stamps.

From the outset, Israel created its own commemorative cancellations, including a first day cancel for the new Doar Ivri on May 16, 1948, and cancels for the Maccabiah Games and its major cities the same year. By 1960, more than 325 unique postmarks had been designed. Beginning with the Doar Ivri stamps, too, Israel has provided first day covers. For instance, on July 5, 1967, a first day cover featuring Moshe Dayan was issued from the new post office in Jerusalem, soon after the Six-Day War.

Israel has 64 post offices in 1950, expanding to 114 by 1960 and, after the Six-Day War, to 178 branches by 1970. In 1955, two settlements in the Negev began Israel's first mobile post office, a red truck. By 1990, Israel ran 53 routes for 1,058 locations, including Israeli settlements in the West Bank and Gaza.

Due to hyperinflation, in 1982 and 1984 Israel issued non-denominated stamps with an olive branch design. These stamps were said to be dreary yet convenient, insofar as they avoided the need for both the government and the customers to constantly update their postage.

During the 1990s, Israel experimented with vending machines for postal labels (franking labels). The Klussendorf machines and their labels were withdrawn from service in 1999. Twenty-two colorful designs were issued, including 12 tourist sites and seven holiday season designs. Israel Post also provides the Express Mail Service in cooperation with 143 other postal authorities.

The Israel Defense Forces provide mail services for the military. During the 1973 Yom Kippur War, for example, the IDF postal agency issued a series of postcards with cartoons to boost morale. Postcards show an Israeli cartoon character looming over Damascus, hail and fire raining down on Egyptian pyramids (quoting Exodus 9:24), and "Judgment Day, pictured here".

=== Postage stamps ===
In its early years, Israel issued stamps picturing the Jewish holidays, Jerusalem, Petah Tikva, the Negev, the Maccabiah Games, and Independence bonds. Every year, Israel issues a festival series to commemorate Rosh Hashanah. In 1948, the festival series featured the "flying scrolls". In a self-reflective gesture, the postal authority also issued a souvenir sheet commemorating its own first stamps. In 1952, Israel issued its first stamp honoring a named person, Chaim Weizmann. Other honorees of the 1950s included Theodor Herzl, Edmond de Rothschild, Albert Einstein, Sholem Aleichem, Hayim Nahman Bialik and Eliezer Ben-Yehuda. The first woman honored was Henrietta Szold (1960), the first rabbi was the Baal Shem Tov (1961), and the first non-Jew was Eleanor Roosevelt (1964).

In 1998, Israel was the first country to honor Chiune Sugihara, who has since been honored on stamps from Gambia, Grenada, Guinea, Japan, Liberia, Lithuania, and Sierra Leone. Stamps were issued in memory of two Arab leaders, King Hassan II of Morocco and King Hussein of Jordan, in 2000.

Researchers at Emory University found that, through 2005, 161 Israeli stamps deal with women, though most do so anonymously. Of the 45 stamps dedicated to individual women, 11 concerned Biblical characters and eight were of fighters: Haviva Reik, Hannah Szenes, Rachel Yanait Ben Zvi, Rivka Guber, Rene Levy, Zivia Lubetkin, Sarah Aaronsohn, and an unnamed member of the Jewish Brigade.

Israeli stamps cover general themes, including philately itself, such as the 1954 stamp exhibition in Jerusalem, as well as themes emblematic of the state, such as Judaism and Jewish history. For instance, in its first 40 years, nearly 10% of Israeli stamps included archeological motifs, for intellectual and ideological reasons.

The country produced a total of 110 new issues in the 1960s, 151 in the 1970s, 162 in the 1980s and 216 in the 1990s. Israel Post produces several dozen new issues each year: 40 new issues in 2000, 33 in 2001, 50 in 2002, 46 in 2003, 38 in 2004, 42 in 2005, 38 in 2006, and 44 in 2007. In 2008, new issues have honored Israel Rokach and Akiva Aryeh Weiss, two UNESCO World Heritage Sites (The Biblical Tels and the Incense Route), and Mekorot (the national water system).

=== Joint issues ===
Since its 1993 stamp for the 50th anniversary of Warsaw Ghetto Uprising, issued jointly with Poland, such joint issue stamps have been produced with other postal authorities and in 1996, a joint Hanukkah stamp was issued with the United States, in miniature sheet format. This was Israel's first self-adhesive stamp.

On January 27, 2008, a joint issue with the United Nations debuted for International Holocaust Remembrance Day. Stamps were also issued jointly with Germany (in 2005) to honor their diplomatic relations, Austria and Hungary (2004, honoring Theodor Herzl), Italy (2004, honoring the Great Synagogue of Rome), Georgia (in 2001, honoring Shota Rustaveli), and Hungary (in 2001, honoring the Dohány Synagogue of Budapest).

=== Withdrawals ===
Israel Post has been forced on a number of occasions to withdraw certain stamps which caused concern in religious circles. In November 2006 a stamp bearing the Divine Name was taken out of circulation over fear that it may be treated with disrespect. Similar action was taken over a series that depicted passages from the Talmud.

== Relations with Palestinian postal services ==
Starting in 1994–1995, Israel shifted away from providing postal services for territories that, under the Oslo Accords, were to come under the auspices of the Palestinian National Authority (PNA). The PNA established post offices throughout the PNA, developed its own unique postmarks and issued stamps. The PNA's Ministry of Telecom & Information Technology issued a critical report on postal services in areas under Israeli control.

== Israeli stamp collecting ==
The Israel Philatelic Federation lists 12 stamp clubs, and 11 philatelic businesses in Israel. The country has stamp fairs (using its own cancellation), annual souvenir sheets, postage exhibitions, philatelic journals, and catalogs (pictured). In 1998, the Israel Post established the Postal and Philatelic Museum in Tel Aviv. Tel Aviv was selected to host the 2008 World Stamp Championship under the auspices of the Fédération Internationale de Philatélie, the international organization for philately.

Collecting stamps of broadly Jewish interest, forming topical Judaica collections, is a hobby of philatelists everywhere. While the sources listed in the previous paragraph catalogue Israeli stamps, there is no central catalogue of topical Judaica stamps. There is, however, the Judaica Topical Association and Judaica Topical News.

Emory University in Atlanta (Georgia, US) created an ongoing database for both Israeli and topical Judaica stamps rooted in, but not limited to, its own Sol Singer Collection of Philatelic Judaica. The database, composed of downloadable "stampcharts" and articles of philatelic interest, is available to the public and Emory University welcomes comments

Owing to sales to collectors, including those in the Jewish diaspora, philatelic items has been a considerable revenue stream for Israel's government and the Israeli post office is a client of the Inter-Governmental Philatelic Corporation.

== See also ==
- Postage stamps and postal history of Palestine
- Postage stamps and postal history of the Palestinian National Authority
- Category:Postage stamps of Israel
