= Otte Wallish =

Israeli graphic designer (1906–1977)

Otte Wallish אוטה וליש
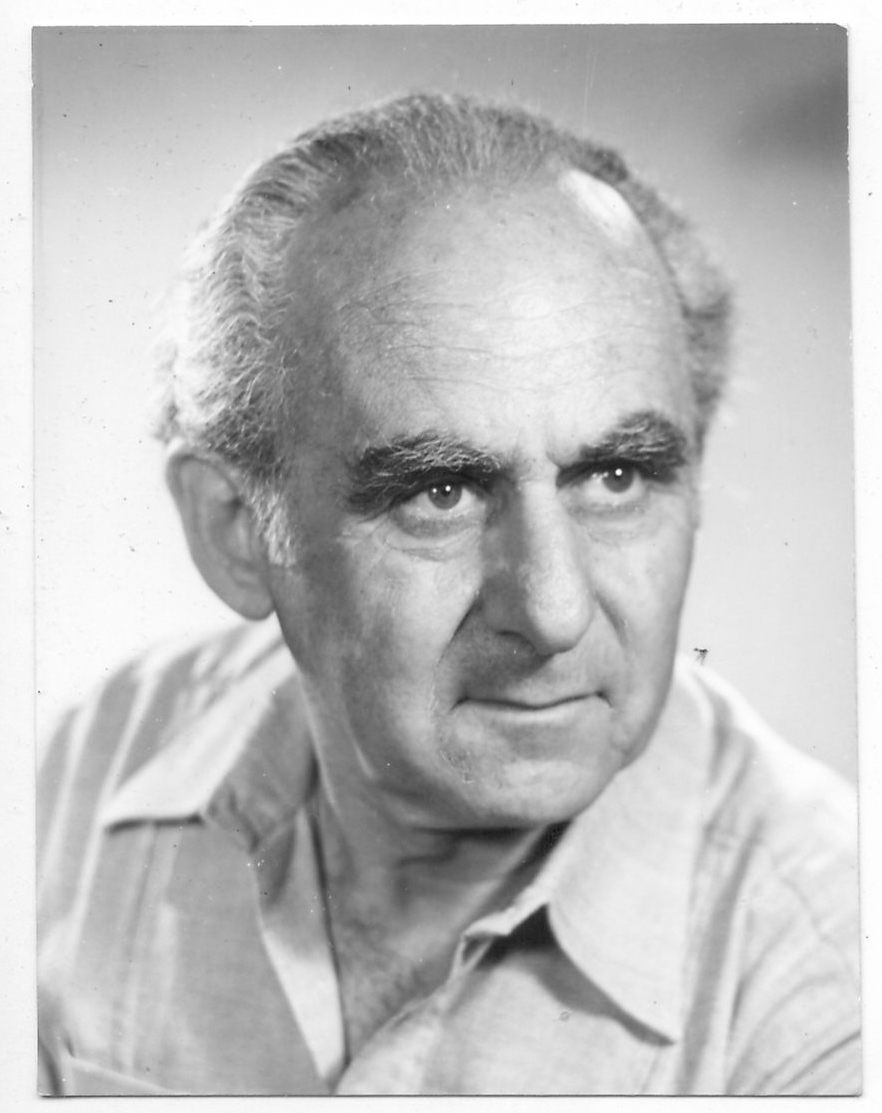
- Born: 1906; Znojmo, Moravia, Austria-Hungary (now Czech Republic)
- Died: 1977 (aged 70–71); Tel Aviv, Israel
- Known for: graphic designer
- Movement: Israeli art

Otte Wallish (Hebrew: אוטה וליש; 1906–1977) was a Czech–Jewish artist and émigré to Mandatory Palestine who established himself as a graphic designer and contributed to the symbolic self-representation of the newly founded State of Israel as a Jewish state.

Born in Znojmo, Austria-Hungary, Wallish studied at the Academy of Fine Arts in Vienna before emigrating to Mandatory Palestine in 1934. He played a significant role in shaping the visual identity of the nascent State of Israel, most notably by designing the scroll for the Israeli Declaration of Independence and the country's first postage stamps, known as the Doar Ivri series. Wallish's work extended to various aspects of Israel's national symbolism, including the design of coins, banknotes, medals, and logos for major corporations. He also created posters promoting Zionism and Jewish immigration to Israel. His contributions to Israeli visual culture spanned from the pre-state period through the early decades of independence, making him a key figure in the development of Israeli graphic design and national iconography.

== Biography ==
Otte Wallish was born in 1906 in the town of Znojmo, Moravia, at the time a crown land of the Austro-Hungarian Empire (today in the Czech Republic). He was a Czech of Jewish descent. He attended the Academy of Fine Arts in Vienna. After serving in the Czech army, he opened a graphic design and advertising office in Prague. He had jobs with the Jewish National Fund and United Israel Appeal. He married and then emigrated by boat to Mandatory Palestine in 1934, a time of increasing peril for European Jews. His wife joined him in 1935; a sibling survived the Holocaust and lived in the Czech Republic. The couple had two children and settled in a Herzliya house with Bauhaus furniture. He used the German Wallisch and, after moving to Israel, adopted the English Wallish transliteration of his name in Hebrew. (His first name is often incorrectly cited as Otto.)

During the 1930s and 1940s, Wallish worked on artistic arrangement, statistical graphs, and other design aspects for books. In 1929, his own book was published, ABC: Ein Bilderbuch. In 1936, Wallish set up a design studio in a building in Nahalat Binyamin, Tel Aviv, that had been chosen as a national landmark. His design studio doubled as a kind of front for SHA'I, the Haganah's secret service.

== Israel's Declaration of Independence scroll and ceremony ==
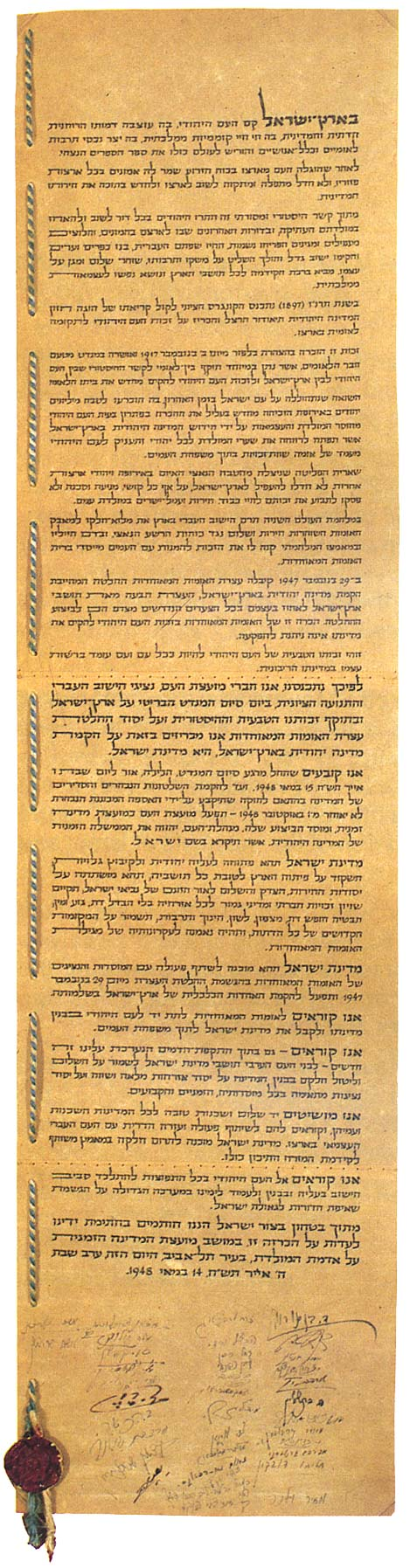
Declaration of Independence Scroll designed by Otte Wallish

Wallish was responsible for the calligraphy and design of the scroll for the Israeli Declaration of Independence. Due to drafting debates beyond his control, Wallish had only finished the bottom part of the scroll by the time of the signing and announcement. In fact, David Ben-Gurion did not read the actual scroll but had to work from handwritten notes for the public declaration on 14 May 1948. The photograph shown here was taken by Wallish's brother-in-law, Rudi Weissenstein.

Wallish's scroll was prepared in three sections that were bound together. The original Declaration scroll is located in Israel's National Archives. He based the calligraphy style on a Torah scroll from the 16th century.

In addition, Walisch handled the preparation of the exhibit hall in which the State's Independence was announced. At the direction of Ben-Gurion and the immediate guidance of Ze'ev Sharef, Secretary of the National Administration, Wallish had the hall cleared of art not related to Jews and Israel. He had the hall's works exchanged for such works as Marc Chagall's Jew Holding a Scroll.

== Postal stamps ==
=== Israel's first Doar Ivri stamps ===
Sketch by Wallish for the first stamps of a country to be named Yehudah

In 1948, too, Wallish took the lead in designing Israel's first postage stamps. He chose a design based on ancient coins, found in archaeological research on the First Jewish-Roman War and the Bar Kochba Revolt. He also designed the first day cover for the stamps' first usage on the first business day after Independence was declared, Sunday, 16 May 1948. Since the name of the state had not yet been determined during the design and secretive printing of the stamps, they were designed with the name Doar Ivri ("Hebrew mail") rather than Israel, the name found on all subsequent postage issues.

In 2007, several original pieces of Wallish artwork for the Doar Ivri stamp were sold at auction. In one preliminary essay, the stamp is designed as a triangle. Furthermore, in another Wallish essay, the stamps on the first day cover were prepared with the "wrong" name of the state: Yehudah (Hebrew: יהודה, cf. Judah or Judea), as shown here. He had also proposed to put Eretz Yisrael on the stamps, which the provisional government leaders turned down as well. After speaking privately with German stamp dealers, who recommended a Hebrew equivalent to Deutsche Post ("German Mail"), Wallish proposed the phrase Doar Ivri, which was accepted.

=== Other Israel stamps ===
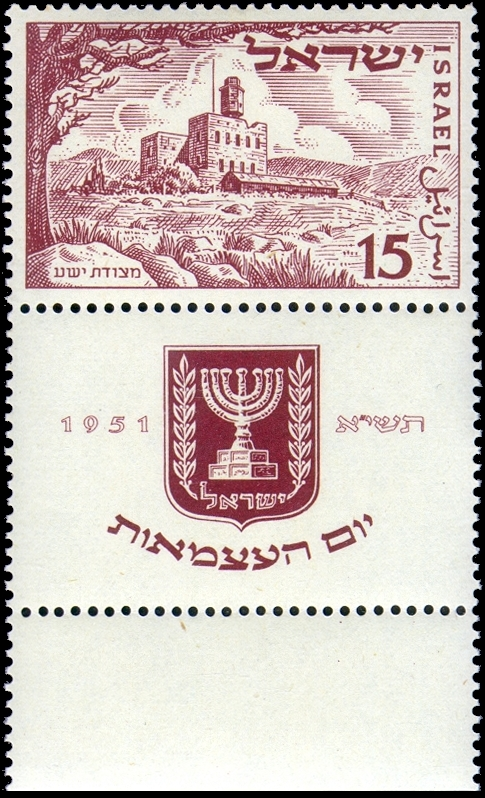
Third Independence Day stamp, featuring the Yesha Fort (issued on May 9, 1951). Inscription on tab: "Independence Day 5711 – 1951".

After completing the Doar Ivri series, Wallish continued to be a leading designer of Israeli stamps. His Doar Ivri design was also used for Israel's first provisional postage dues; he then designed the First Festival stamps (the first bearing the name of Israel, featuring an ancient LMLK seal impression), Israel's first postage dues (1949) and the symbol of the Israel Post. Wallish also designed the annual holiday stamp in 1952, stamps for three philatelic exhibitions (the souvenir sheet for Tabul 1949, Taba 1952, Tabim 1954). He also prepared the first airmail stamps, a definitive series with motifs from ancient art (1950), the coinage stamps definitives (based on doar ivri but with Israel named), as well as provisional official mail (bul sherut) stamps on the coinage design (1951) stamps.

Wallish also contributed a variety of original designs, including stamps commemorating Petah Tikva's 70th anniversary, Israel Independence Day (1951, 52, 54, 57, and 58), World Refugee Year (1960), the 25th Zionist Congress (1960), and the centennial of the Hebrew press in Israel (with a Halbanon newspaper page in the background, 1963). He also designed a menorah stamp (1952) and a defense series (1957), with the insignia of the Haganah.

In 1950, Wallish designed a stamp to celebrate Israel's acceptance into the Universal Postal Union. With a globe in the background, the design foregrounds the symbol of the Israel Post, a running stag. He had submitted a bid for a design of the Israel Post symbol but had lost out to the brothers Shamir, who were also active in designing stamps. In 1952, Wallish again featured the running stag in his new series of postage dues. In 1957, the UPU graphic was enlisted for the first Israeli aerogrammes. Wallish lost out to the brothers Shamir again in competing for the 1949 Jerusalem stamp. Whereas the winning design depicts a scene looking up toward the city and the Tower of David, the Wallish artwork shows a flat approach and two religious Jews on the path to Jerusalem.

Less well known are the stamps that Wallish designed but were not mass-produced. In 1948, the Israeli Army planned to print special military stamps. Wallish submitted designs that were accepted and printed on a trial basis in July 1958. One stamp (10 mil) portrayed a Jewish warrior from Egypt, another (15 mil) the Menorah from the Arch of Titus, and the highest denomination bore the sword and olive branch insignia of the Haganah. However, civilian postal officials turned down the idea and the four-color stamps were never put into use.

== Numismatics ==
=== Israel's first coins ===
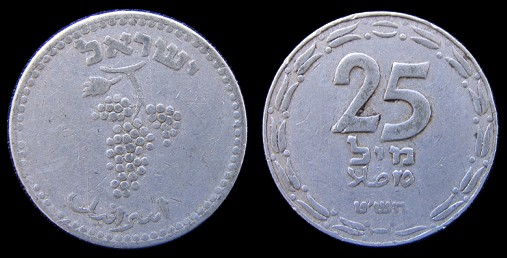
First coins, 1948

Israel's first coins were designed from a proposal submitted by the Israel Numismatic Society, put together with Leo Kadman, Hanan Pavel, and Wallish.

=== Banknotes, medallions and medals ===
In addition, Wallish designed paper currency, the Israeli government's first medallion, with a coin bearing the inscription IVDAEA CAPTA (lit. Judaea captured), and military medals.

== Posters and symbols ==
For municipalities in Israel, Wallish designed insignias; for major corporations—including Osem and Tnuva—he created logos. He did artistic work for advertising campaigns as well.

Over the years, Wallish also designed posters. For instance, one poster shows the Jewish immigration by ship and another promotes the ZIM shipping line. His posters have been featured in exhibition and the 1997 "Selling Zionism" exhibit at the Israel Museum. In 2006, a Wallish poster was shown at "The New Hebrews: 100 Years of Art in Israel" exhibit, Martin-Gropius-Bau in Berlin. An art critic states that "We Will Immigrate (1946) by Otte Wallish (1903–1977) shows a threatening-looking barrage of ships poised to release their passengers—possibly illegal immigrants—onto Palestine's shores." His posters are displayed as well at the Central Zionist Archives and the Tel Aviv Museum.

== Selected works ==
- Mechner, E. and O. Wallisch. Palestine transformed: a pictorial atlas of Eretz Israel. Jerusalem: [Keren Kayemeth (JNF/KKL, Jewish National Fund) and Keren Hayesod (Palestine Foundation Fund)], 1941. (20 pages) This work lists 15 illustration by Wallish, dealing with such topics as the development of the coastal plain, the transformation of the Jezreel Valley from swamps, settlements such as Hanita, stages of "land redemption" and "colonization," the kibbutz and the moshav, and industrial Palestine. On p. 16, four Jews defense soldiers are portrayed: a shomer or guard of 1900, a former Jewish Legion policeman, one of the "Ghaffirim" or "Notrim" (Supernumerary Police) of the 1936–1938 Arab revolt, and the "Palestinian soldier" of the Yishuv.
- Mechner, E. and O. Wallish. Eretz Israel: Facts and figures. Jerusalem: [Keren Kayemeth (Jewish National Fund) and Keren Hayesod (Palestine Foundation Fund)], 1947. (32 pages) The book contains charts, graphs or maps on pages 7–31, including a chart showing the change of Jewish population after the Holocaust by European country, trends in Jewish immigration to Palestine, maps of the Balfour Declaration and the White Papers of 1922 and 1939, improvements in infant mortality and life expectancy among Jews and Arabs, fundraising and land acquisition, irrigation projects, and recruiting for the Jewish Brigade, and foreign trade.
- Mechner, E., artistic arrangement by Otte Wallish. Tel Aviv. (Series: New Palestine in Pictures.) Tel Aviv: The Maon Press, 1937. 31 leaves
- Singer, Miriam. Kelle und Schwert: aus den Heldentagen von Dagania (lit. "Trowel and Sword: From the Heroic Days of Dagania", in German). Jerusalem: KKL Headquarters & Tel Aviv: Omanuth Verlag, 1935. Illustrations by Otte Wallisch.
- Wallisch, Otte. ABC: Ein Bilderbuch (lit. "ABC: A Picture Book", in German). Jerusalem: Keren Kayemeth Leisrael, 1929
- Weichselbaum, S. Hundert Bäume (lit. "One Hundred Trees", in German). Tel Aviv: Omanuth Verlag, 1935. Illustrations by Otte Wallisch.
- Ziman, Joshua. Erez Israel in figures. Jerusalem: Keren Kayemeth Leisrael, 1931
