= Joint issue =

A joint issue is the release of stamps or postal stationery by two or more countries to commemorate the same topic, event or person. Joint issues typically have the same first day of issue and their design is often similar or identical, except for the identification of country and value.

== Continental joint issues ==
- Europa postage stamps : Between 1956 and 1973 the postal authorities of several European nations issued stamps with a common design but since 1974 a common topic is used on stamps issued each year. These are not true joint issues, because they do not share the same designs or dates of issue.

== An early unrealized trans-Atlantic joint issue ==
- 1914 peace commemoratives: In 1914, the United Kingdom, the Dominion of Canada and the United States agreed on a plan by which each of the three nations would issue its own series of stamps that year to commemorate the 100 years of Anglo-American peace that had prevailed since the end of the War of 1812. After the outbreak of World War I later that year, however, the UK and Canada deemed it inappropriate to issue peace stamps and withdrew from the project. The US had already produced essays for 2¢ and 5¢ stamps but canceled further plans for the designs. (This would not have been a true joint issue because each country would have designed its stamps individually.)

== Australia ==
The Australia Post has collaborated several times with the postal administration of another country to release a joint issue.

Year	Postal administration	Topic	Note	Date of issue
1958	New Zealand	30th Anniversary of First Tasman Flight		August 27, 1958
1963	New Zealand; United Kingdom	Completion of the Commonwealth Pacific Cable System		December 3, 1963
1983	New Zealand	Australia-New Zealand Closer Economic Relations Trade Agreement		March 9, 1983
1988	United States	Bicentenary of Australia	Koala and eagle	January 26, 1988
1988	United Kingdom	Bicentenary of Australia		June 21, 1988
1988	New Zealand	Bicentenary of Australia	Koala and kiwi	June 21, 1988
1990	Soviet Union	Scientific Co-operation in Antarctica		June 13, 1990
1995	Thailand; Laos	Opening of the Thai-Lao Friendship Bridge		April 8, 1994
1995	China	Koala and panda		September 1, 1995
1996	Indonesia	Australian Spotted Cuscus (Spilocuscus maculatus) and Indonesian Bear Cuscus (Ailurops ursinus)		March 22, 1996
1996	Germany	Baron Ferdinand von Mueller	Centenary of death of German-Australian botanist	October 9, 1996
1996	Christmas Island	Willem de Vlamingh	Tercentenary of de Vlamingh's voyage to Western Australia	November 1, 1996
1998	Singapore	Native orchids of Australia and Singapore	Phalaenopsis rosenstromii, Arundina graminifolia, Grammatophyllum speciosum, Dendrobium phalaenopsis	August 6, 1998
1999	Canada	Maritime links - Marco Polo		March 19, 1999
1999	Ireland	Maritime links - Polly Woodside		March 19, 1999
2000	Greece	Sydney Olympic Games	Handover to Athens	September 15, 2000
2001	Hong Kong	Dragon boat racing		June 25, 2001
2001	Sweden	Daniel Solander	Swedish botanist who accompanied Captain Cook on HMS Endeavour	August 16, 2001
2002	France	Bicentenary of encounter between Nicolas Baudin and Matthew Flinders		April 4, 2002
2002	Thailand	50th anniversary of diplomatic relations	Waterlilies: Nymphaea immutabilis, Nelumbo nucifera	August 6, 2002
2005	United Kingdom	UNESCO World Heritage Sites	Australia: Greater Blue Mountains Area, Wet Tropics of Queensland, Purnululu National Park, Uluṟu-Kata Tjuṯa National Park; UK: Blenheim Palace, Stonehenge, Heart of Neolithic Orkney, Hadrian's Wall	April 21, 2005
2009	Norfolk Island	Species at Risk	Subantarctic fur seal, C.I. blue-tailed skink, Green turtle, Bridled nail-tail wallaby, N.I. green parrot	August 4, 2009
2010	Papua New Guinea	Kokoda	Kokoda Trail Campaign in WW II	April 20, 2010
2011	South Korea	50th anniversary of diplomatic relations	Musical instruments: haegeum, didgeridoo	October 28 and 31, 2011
2013	Israel	Battle of Beersheba in WW I		May 10, 2013
2013	Germany	Ludwig Leichhardt	Bicentenary of birth of German explorer and naturalist	October 10 and 15, 2013
2014	Norfolk Island	Norfolk Island pines (Araucaria heterophylla)	Centenary of Nortfolk Island as an external territory of Australia	July 22, 2014
2015	New Zealand	ANZAC	Centenary of landing at ANZAC Cove (Gallipoli Campaign in WW I)	April 7, 2015
2015	New Zealand; Singapore	50th anniversary of diplomatic relations between Australia and Singapore and between New Zealand and Singapore	Parliament House, Canberra, Parliament House, Wellington and Parliament House, Singapore	August 14, 2015

[top]

== Austria ==
The Austria Post has collaborated several times with the postal administration of other countries to release joint issues.

Year	Postal administration	Topic	Note	Date of issue
2004	Israel, Hungary	100th anniversary of death of Theodor Herzl		
2010	Israel	Simon Wiesenthal, Nazi hunter		June 14, 2010
2020	Vatican City	Christmas		November 20, 2020

[top]

== Belgium ==
The Belgium Post has collaborated several times with the postal administration of other countries to release joint issues.

Year	Postal administration	Topic	Images	Note
1991	Portugal	Europalia '91	Princess Isabel and Philip le Bon	
1991	Finland	Alfred William Finch (1854–1930)	Painting The English Coast near Dover	
1993	Hungary	Missale Romanus		
1994	France, Switzerland	Georges Simenon		
1995	Ireland	250th anniversary of the Battle of Fontenoy		
1996	Luxembourg	Théo van Rysselberghe		
1997	Italy	Queen Paola of Belgium		
1999	Israel	Paintings of James Ensor		
1998	France	René Magritte		
1998	Poland	Mniszech Palace		
2001	China	Pottery and Porcelain		
2001	Democratic Republic of the Congo	70th Anniversary of Tintin in the Congo		
2002	Croatia	Lace		
2002	Portugal	Windmills		
2004	France	Centenary of Edgar Pierre Jacobs' birth creator of comic Blake and Mortimer		
2005	Turkey	Carpets and tapestry; relationship between both countries.		
2006	Denmark	CoBrA (Copenhagen - Brussels - Amsterdam) artist group (1948–1951); paintings.		
2006	Singapore	Reassignment of commercial warehouses.		
2007	Czech Republic	Stoclet Palace		
2007	Luxembourg	Luxembourg: 2007 European culture capital.		
2008	New Zealand	New Zealand: 90th anniversary of the end of World War One.		
2012	Monaco	Art by Jan Brueghel; Cabaret on the Banks of the River	Souvenir sheet	

[top]

== Berlin ==
Deutsche Bundespost Berlin of West Berlin prior to German reunification in 1990 had released the following joint issues.

Year	Postal administration	Topic	Images	Note
1969	Venezuela	200th birthday of Alexander von Humboldt		
1990	Austria; West Germany; East Germany; Belgium	500th anniversary of European Postal Services		

[top]

== Brazil ==
Year	Postal administration	Topic	Note	Date of issue
2000	Portugal	Discovery of Brazil, 500th anniversary	Block of 4	April 11, 2000
2000	China	Masks and puppets		October 9, 2000
2001	South Africa	World Conference Against Racism		August 30, 2001
2002	Argentina; France; Germany; Italy; Uruguay	2002 World Cup Soccer Tournament		April 22, 2002
2005	Cuba	Dances		August 16, 2005
2007	Uruguay	Giuseppe Garibaldi, Italian leader		July 4, 2007
2008	Portugal	Arrival of Portuguese Royal Family, 200th anniversary		January 22, 2008
2008	Japan	Japanese immigration to Brazil		June 18, 2008
2009	South Korea	Bridges		October 30, 2009
2010	Syria	Historical and tourist sites		June 28, 2010
2011	Serbia	Writers	Ivo Andric of Yugoslavia (Nobel Prize winner); Rachel de Queiroz of Brazil	October 26, 2011
2012	Mexico	Traditional foods of Brazil and Mexico		June 1, 2012

[top]

== Bulgaria ==
Bulgarian Posts of the Republic of Bulgaria have released the following joint issues:

Year	Postal administration	Topic	Note	Date of issue
2009	Italy	Diplomatic relations, 130th anniversary	Souvenir sheet	October 22, 2009
2009	Serbia	Nature conservation: Balkan area birds.	Twin issue - Two identical stamps. Eurasian woodcock (Scolopax rusticola); Rufous-tailed rock thrush (Monticola saxatilis). Multicolored	
2013	Czech Republic; Slovakia; Vatican City	Mission of Sts. Cyril and Methodius to Slavic Lands 1150th anniversary	Souvenir sheet	
2013	Russia	135th anniversary of the Russo-Turkish War (1877–1878)	Souvenir sheet	
2014	Russia	Diplomatic relations, 135th anniversary		
2016	Israel	Bird Migration. Storks: The stork is connected to human habitats and in Europe it signifies the arrival of spring and symbolizes hope. Some 600,000 storks migrate through Israel's skies twice a year, among them probably all of Bulgaria's storks.	Souvenir leaf	September 13, 2016
2017	Ukraine	Black Sea Flora and Fauna	Souvenir sheet	
2018	Russia	140th anniversary of the Russo-Turkish War (1877–1878)	Souvenir sheet	

[top]

== Canada ==
Canada Post has released the following joint issues. The United States Postal Service has been Canada Post's most prolific philatelic partner.

Year	Postal administration	Topic	Note	Date of issue
1959	United States	Opening of the St. Lawrence Seaway	Same design single issued by both countries.	June 26, 1959
1976	United States	United States Bicentennial	Same design single issued by both countries.	June 1, 1976
1977	United States	50th anniversary Peace Bridge	United States' stamp design has a markedly different design than the Canadian issue.	August 4, 1977
1984	France	350th anniversary of Jacques Cartier's landing in New France	Same design single issued by both countries.	April 20, 1984
1984	United States	25th anniversary of the St. Lawrence Seaway	United States design differs from Canada design but uses same colours.	June 26, 1984
1990	China	Norman Bethune (1890–1939), surgeon	Same design se-tenant pair issued by both countries.	March 2, 1990
1992	United States	50th Anniversary of the Alaska Highway	USA design differs considerably from Canadian design.	May 15, 1992
1995	Mexico	Migratory Wildlife	Mexico design differs from Canadian design.	August 15, 1995
1997	Italy	John Cabot	Same design single issued by both countries.	June 24, 1997
1999	Australia	Maritime links	On stamp of each country on one souvenir sheet. Designs are significantly different. Sailing ship - Marco Polo	March 19, 1999
2002	Hong Kong	Corals	Identical souvenir sheets of 4 stamps issued by each country in native denomination(s).	May 19, 2002
2002	Thailand	National Emblems	Different souvenir sheets of 2 stamps issued by each country in native denomination.	October 4, 2003
2004	Greenland; Norway	150th birthday of Otto Sverdrup	Identical souvenir sheets from each country. Canada & Greenland 1 stamp and 2 labels; Norway 2 stamps and 1 label.	March 24, 2004
2004	France	400th anniversary of first French settlement in Acadia at Saint Croix Island, Maine	Same design single issued by both countries. Canada also issued a souvenir sheet with stamp from each country. Pierre Dugua, Sieur de Monts	June 26, 2004
2005	Ireland	Biosphere reserves	Same design se-tenant pair issued by both countries in differing souvenir sheet designs. Each country also issued same design se-tenant pairs in sheet format. Killarney National Park & Waterton Lakes National Park featuring the Saskatoon berry	April 22, 2005
2005	China	Diplomatic relations, 35th anniversary	Same designs each country. Canada: one pane of 16 ( 8 se-tenant pairs) and souvenir sheet of 1 se-tenant pair; China: one pane of 8 of each design. Wild cats.	October 13, 2005
2006	United States	Quadricentennial of Champlain's voyages	Both countries' stamps also appear on a single souvenir sheet.	May 28, 2006
2007	Denmark; Finland; Greenland; Iceland; Norway; Sweden; United States	International Polar Year 2007–2008	Each participating country issued identical sized souvenir sheet but each country's stamp design is different.	February 12, 2007
2008	France	400th anniversary of the founding of Quebec City	Same design single issued by both countries.	May 16, 2008
2008	Japan	Publication of Anne of Green Gables written by Lucy Maud Montgomery	Japan issue is sheet of 12 including 1 se-tenant pair of same design as Canada. Canada issue is souvenir sheet of 2, and 2 self-adhesive singles from booklet	June 20, 2008
2010	Israel	Friendship with Israel, 60th anniversary	Same design single issued by both countries. Canada's version ex self-adhesive booklet.	April 14, 2010
2010	Sweden	Sea mammals	Two designs se-tenant in souvenir sheet [Canada]; Each country issued same design se-tenant pairs in booklet format.	May 13, 2010
2012	Guernsey	War of 1812	Same two designs in se-tenant pair for each country issued in sheet format.	June 15, 2012
2017	France	100th Anniversary of the Battle of Vimy Ridge	Both countries' same design stamps appear on a single souvenir sheet: Canada - 2 single stamps; France - 1 se-tenant pair.	April 8, 2017
2017	India	Diwali, the Festival of Lights	Same design se-tenant pair issued by both countries. Both countries also issued the pair in different souvenir sheet designs, with Canada having one stamp from each countries forming a pair.	September 21, 2017
2017	United States	The History of Hockey	Two stamp designs used by both countries. One stamp showing a player in a contemporary uniform and using modern equipment, and the other wearing vintage garb and using old-fashioned gear. The non-denominated (49¢) U.S. forever stamps issued in two different formats: in a pane of 20, and in a souvenir sheet of two stamps. Canada's non-denominated (85¢) permanent-rate stamps issued in a booklet of 10 self-adhesive stamps, and a perforated gummed souvenir sheet of two.	October 20, 2017

[top]

== Chile ==
Year	Postal administration	Topic	Note
1997	Japan	Diplomatic relations centenary	
2002	Poland	Ignacy Domeyko (1802–89), mineralogist	
2006	Estonia	Antarctic wildlife	Se-tenant pair
2010	Ireland	John Mackenna (1771–1814), Bernardo O'Higgins (1778–1842)	Irishmen involved in Chilean independence

[top]

== People's Republic of China ==
Year	Postal administration	Topic	Note	Date of issue
1990	Canada	Norman Bethune (1890–1939), surgeon		
1994	United States	Cranes	Whooping crane and black-necked crane	
1995	Australia	Wildlife	Koalas and pandas	
1996	South Korea	China/Korea submarine fiber-optic cable system		
1996	San Marino	Diplomatic relations, 25th anniversary		
1996	Singapore	Waterfronts	Singapore waterfront Panmen, Suzhoa, China	
1997	Sweden	Pheasants	Chinese copper pheasant common pheasant	
1997	New Zealand	Roses	China rose New Zealand monthly rose	
1998	Germany	World culture and natural heritage: Würzburg Palace and Puning Temple	Two values with unique images	
1998	France	The Louvre, France; Hall of Heavenly Peace, Imperial Palace, China		
1998	Switzerland	Chillon Castle, Lake Geneva; Bridge 24, Slender West Lake, Yangzhou		
1999	North Korea	Mount Lu, Mount Kumgang		
1999	Russia	Red deer	Se-tenant pair	
2000	Cuba	Beaches	Coconuts Bay, China; Varadero Beach, Cuba	
2001	Belgium	Ancient Chinese receptacles		
2001	Egypt	Ancient gold masks	Mask of San Xing Dui; Funerary mask of Tutankhamun	
2001	Portugal	Sailing ships	Chinese junk Portuguese caravel	
2002	Malaysia	Flowers		
2002	Hong Kong; Macau	2002 World Cup Soccer Tournament	Different designs. A souvenir sheet exists with stamps of the three countries	
2002	Slovakia	Architecture	Bojnice Castle, Slovakia; Handan Congtai Pavilion, China	
2002	South Korea	Martial arts	Se-tenant pair	
2003	Iran	Buildings	Bell tower, China; Mosque, Iran	
2003	Hungary	Book printing	Ritual of Zhou, China; Hungarian illuminated chronicle	
2003	Hong Kong; Macau	Launch of 1st crewed Chinese spacecraft		
2004	Singapore	Suzhou Industrial Park, 10th anniversary		
2004	Greece	2004 Summer Olympics, Athens		
2004	Romania	Chinese and Romanian handicrafts	Drum with tigers and birds, China; Cucuteni pottery jar, Romania	
2004	Spain	Buildings	Jinmao Tower, China; Park Guell, Spain	
2005	Liechtenstein	Painting of flower arrangements		
2006	Netherlands	Farm technology		
2006	Poland	Silver and gold objects		June 20, 2006
2007	Hong Kong	Handover of Hong Kong to China, 10th anniversary		
2007	Mexico	Mountains	Mount Gongga, China; Popocatepetl, Mexico	
2008	India	Temples	White Horse Temple, China; Maha Bodhi Temple, India	June 6, 2008
2008	United Kingdom	Handover of the Olympic Flag	National Stadium, Beijing; Corner Tower, Forbidden City; London Eye; Tower of London	
2009	Macau	Return of Macau to China, 10th anniversary		
2011	Denmark	Armillary spheres		
2012	Israel	Diplomatic relations, 20th anniversary		
2013	Turkey	Bridges		
2014	France	Rivers		
2019	Slovakia	75th anniversary of diplomatic relations		October 7, 2019

[top]

== Croatia ==
Year	Postal administration	Topic	Note
1998	Vatican City	Christmas	
1998	Slovakia	Cardinal Juraj Haulik (1788–1869)	Archbishop of Zagreb
2002	Czech Republic	80th anniversary of the death of Vlaho Bukovac	Divan
2002	Belgium	Lace	
2003	Hungary	St. Laszlo his royal robes	Issued June 13, 2003
2008	Slovenia	Stone buildings	
2011	Vatican City	Rudjer Boskovich (1711–1787), astronomer	Also depicts dome of St Peters Basilica
2012	San Marino	20 years of diplomatic relations	Souvenir sheet of 2
2017	Israel	Flowers	Issued September 4, 2017

[top]

== Cyprus ==
The Cyprus Postal Services of the Republic of Cyprus has released the following joint issues.

Year	Postal administration	Topic	Note	Date of issue
1996	Russia	Orthodox Christian religion	Block of 4 stamps	
1999	Greece	4000 years of Hellenism	Block of 4 stamps	
2004	Czech Republic; Estonia; Latvia; Lithuania; Hungary; Malta; Poland; Slovakia; Slovenia	Admission to the European Union	Single stamp	
2006	India	Folk dances	Nati dance of Himachal Pradesh, India; Folk Dance of Cyprus	April 12, 2006
2008	Malta	Adoption of euro	Miniature sheet	

[top]

== Czech Republic ==
Česká pošta of the Czech Republic has released the following joint issues.

Year	Postal administration	Topic	Note
1993	Germany; Slovakia	600th anniversary of the death of John of Nepomuk	
1993	Slovakia	Arrival of St Cyril and St Methodius, 1130th anniversary	
1993	Slovakia; Sweden	Painting The Baroque Chair by Nemes	
1997	Israel	Jewish monuments in Prague	
1997	Germany; Hungary; Poland; Vatican City	St Adalbert	
2002	Croatia	80th anniversary of the death of Vlaho Bukovac	Divan
2004	Cyprus; Estonia; Latvia; Lithuania; Hungary; Malta; Poland; Slovakia; Slovenia	Admission to the European Union	Single stamp
2005	France	Battle of Austerlitz 1805–2005	
2007	Belgium	Stoclet Palace	
2008	Slovakia	Karel Plicka	Miniature sheet
2011	Slovenia	Johann Gerstner, violinist	
2011	Luxembourg	Marriage of John of Luxembourg and Elizabeth of Bohemia	700th anniversary
2011	Hungary; Poland; Slovakia	Visegrad Group - 20th anniversary	
2013	Bulgaria; Slovakia; Vatican City	Mission of Sts. Cyril and Methodius to Slavic Lands 1150th anniversary	Souvenir sheet
2016	Hungary; Poland; Slovakia	450th anniversary of the birth of Jan Jesenius	
2019	Slovakia	30th anniversary of the Velvet Revolution	November 13, 2019

[top]

== Denmark ==
Post Danmark has collaborated a number of times with other postal administration to release joint issues.

Year	Postal administration	Topic	Note
1963	Greenland	50th anniversary of the Bohr model	
1967	Greenland	Wedding of Margrethe II of Denmark and Henrik, Prince Consort of Denmark	
1968	Greenland	Children's charity	Semi-postal
1969	Finland; Iceland; Norway; Sweden	100 years of postal cooperation of the Nordic countries	
1973	Finland; Iceland; Norway; Sweden	Nordic House in Iceland	
1973	Greenland	Volcano outbreak of Heimaey	Semi-postal
1977	Finland; Iceland; Norway; Sweden	Nature conservation	
1985	West Germany	30th anniversary of the Bonn-Copenhagen declarations	
1985	Greenland	25th anniversary of Ingrid of Sweden's arrival to Denmark	
1985	Sweden	900th anniversary of Canute IV of Denmark's gift to the Diocese of Lund	
1988	France	Danish–French Cultural Year	Hommage à Léon Degand, Robert Jacobsen
1992	Greenland	25th wedding anniversary of Margrethe II of Denmark and Henrik, Prince Consort of Denmark	
1993	Russia	500 years of diplomatic relations	
1995	Sweden	450th birthday of Tycho Brahe	
2000	Sweden	Inauguration of the Oresund Bridge	
2002	Faroe Islands; Greenland	Centennial of the International Council for the Exploration of the Sea	
2003	Greenland	Centennial for Danish exploration in Greenland	
2004	Faroe Islands; Greenland	Wedding of Frederik, Crown Prince of Denmark and Mary, Crown Princess of Denmark	
2005	Malta	200th birthday of Hans Christian Andersen	
2005	Germany	50th anniversary of the Bonn-Copenhagen Declarations	
2006	Belgium	Paintings of the avant-garde movement COBRA	
2012	China	Armillary Spheres	By Tycho Brahe and Guo Shoujing
2013	Faroe Islands	Danish theologian and philosopher, Søren Aabye Kierkegaard	

[top]

== Ecuador ==
Year	Postal administration	Topic	Note	Date of issue
2010	Venezuela	Manuela Sáenz (1797–1856)	Mistress of Simón Bolivar	May 24, 2010

[top]

== Estonia ==
The Estonian Post Office has collaborated a number of times with other postal administration to release joint issues.

Year	Postal administration	Topic	Note	Date of issue	Stamp year
1992	Latvia; Lithuania; Sweden	Mare Balticum. Nature conservation of the Baltic Sea		03. October 1992	
1993	Finland	Friendship		08. February 1993	
1995	Latvia; Lithuania	Via Baltica		20. April 1995	
1997	Latvia; Lithuania	Old ships of the Baltic Sea		10. May 1997	
1999	Latvia; Lithuania	10th anniversary of the Baltic Way		23. August 1999	
2000	Russia	Fish of Lake Peipsi-Pihkva		25. October 2000	
2001	Latvia; Lithuania	Nature of the Baltic Sea coast		15. September 2001	
2003	Ukraine	Old trade routes from the Baltic Sea along the Dnieper River		17. September 2003	
2004	Cyprus; Czech Republic; Latvia; Lithuania; Hungary; Malta; Poland; Slovakia; Slovenia	Admission to the European Union		01. May 2004	
2005	Kazakhstan	Hunting dogs		19. October 2005	
2006	Chile	Estonian-Chilean friendship, Antarctica		25. October 2006	
2008	Latvia; Lithuania	The highest orders of the Baltic states		15. March 2008	
2012	Latvia; Lithuania	Railway bridges		25. October 2012	
2014	Latvia; Lithuania	25th anniversary of the Baltic Chain		23. August 2014	2014
2016	Latvia; Lithuania	Baltic Assembly 25		08. November 2016	2016
2017	Romania	Forests' gold: Forest species		24. November 2017	2017
2018	Israel	Litwinsky house		28. August 2018	2018
2020	Russia	Discovery of Antarctica 200		28. January 2020	2020
2021	Brazil			01. November 2021	

[top]

== Finland ==
Posti has collaborated a number of times with other postal administration to release joint issues.

Year	Postal administration	Topic	Note	Date of issue
1967	Sweden	Pioneer works of Finnish immigrants to Sweden		June 16
1969	Denmark; Iceland; Norway; Sweden	100 years of postal cooperation of the Nordic countries		February 28
1973	Denmark; Iceland; Norway; Sweden	Nordic House in Iceland		June 26
1977	Denmark; Iceland; Norway; Sweden	Nature conservation		February 2
1985	Soviet Union	150 years of the national epic Kalevala		February 28
1988	Sweden; United States	350th anniversary of the founding of New Sweden		March 29
1991	Belgium	Alfred William Finch (1854–1930)	2 stamps, ceramic vase, Iris, painting The English Coast near Dover	September 7
1993	Estonia	Friendship		February 8
1993	Russia	750th anniversary of Vyborg		May 6
1994	Sweden	Finland-Sweden track and field meet		August 26
1995	Russia	Endangered species	Block of 4	March 1
1999	Åland Islands	Primula veris - the symbol of Åland		April 28
1999	Italy	Christmas		November 5
2006	Sweden	Suomenlinna		May 4
2007	Hong Kong	Woodwork	Souvenir sheet of 2	November 2
2008	Greenland	125th anniversary of the first passing of the great ice barrier by Adolf Erik Nordenskiöld		October 20
2010	Japan	Christmas		November 5

[top]

== France ==
The French Post Office has collaborated with the postal administration of other countries to release several joint issues.

Year	Postal administration	Topic	Note	Date of issue
1983	United States	Bicentennial of Treaty of Paris	Stamp designs are dissimilar	September 2, 1983
1984	Canada	350th anniversary of Jacques Cartier's landing in New France		April 20, 1984
1986	United States	Centennial of the Statue of Liberty		July 4, 1986
1986	Finland	Lapland expedition, 250th anniversary	Proved Earth's poles are flattened	September 5, 1986
1988	Germany	France-Germany Cooperative Treaty, 25th anniversary	Konrad Adenauer and Charles de Gaulle	January 15, 1988
1988	Denmark	French-Danish Cultural Exchange Program; Sculpture by Robert Jacobsen	Homage to Leon Degand	September 22, 1988
1988	Switzerland	Painting by Jean Tinguely	Méta-mécanique	November 25, 1988
1989	United States	Bicentennial of the French Revolution	Stamp designs dissimilar; France issued three stamps plus label	March–July, 1989
1992	Greece	1992 Summer Olympics, Barcelona		April 3, 1992
1994	Sweden	France Sweden cultural relations	Booklet pane of 6 stamps	March 18, 1994
1994	United Kingdom	Opening of the Channel Tunnel	Two se-tenant pairs	May 3, 1994
1994	Belgium; Switzerland	Georges Simenon (1903–1989)	Writer	October 15, 1994
1996	Monaco; Italy	RAMOGE agreement between France, Italy and Monaco, 20th anniversary		May 14, 1996
1998	Belgium	Painting by René Magritte	The Return	April 18, 1998
1998	China	The Louvre, France; Hall of Heavenly Peace, Imperial Palace, China		September 12, 1998
1999	Poland	Frédéric Chopin (1810–1849), composer		October 17, 1999
2000	New Zealand	Birds	Kiwi and falcon	November 4, 2000
2002	Australia	Bicentenary of encounter between Nicolas Baudin and Matthew Flinders		April 4, 2002
2003	India	Fine arts	A peacock from 19th-century Indian jewellery crafted in the Meenakari tradition and a rooster from the 15th-century French work Heures à l'usage de Rome	December 1, 2003
2004	United Kingdom	Centenary of Entente Cordiale	British and French art	April 6, 2004
2004	Italy; United Nations	World Day of Road Safety	3 UN issues (New York, Geneva, Vienna)	April 7, 2004
2004	Belgium	Centenary of Edgar Pierre Jacobs' birth creator of the comic Blake and Mortimer		May 15, 2004
2004	Canada	400th anniversary of first French settlement in Acadia at Saint Croix Island, Maine	Pierre Dugua, Sieur de Monts	June 26, 2004
2005	Czech Republic	Battle of Austerlitz 1805–2005		May 4, 2005
2005	Vatican City	Louvre and Vatican Museums	Based on a painting and a sketch by Raphael	November 10, 2005
2006	United Nations	UNESCO World Heritage Sites	French towns: Provins, Mont Saint-Michel, Paris: Banks of the Seine, Roman aqueduct over the Gardon, Carcassonne &and Château de Chambord	June 17, 2006
2006	Argentina	Music and dance; anniversary of Argentinean tango artist Carlos Gardel	Stylized dancers and bandoneón player	June 21, 2006
2006	Romania	French-speaking countries summit in Bucharest	Constantin Brâncuși sculptures; Sleeping Muse and The Sleep	September 25, 2006
2007	Armenia	Year of Armenia in France		May 22, 2007
2007	French Southern and Antarctic Lands; French Polynesia; Mayotte; New Caledonia; Saint Pierre and Miquelon; Wallis and Futuna	Bicentennial of the Cour des Comptes (French Government Accountability Office)	Palais Cambon building, national flag, dates 1807–2007	March 17, 2007
2008	Canada	400th anniversary of the founding of Quebec City		May 16, 2008
2008	Brazil	Relationship between France and Brazil	Mer de Glace in the Alps and Serra do Araca in Amazonia.	July 13, 2008
2008	Vietnam		Bonifacio in France and Halong Bay in Vietnam.	October 15, 2008
2008	Israel	Commemorating first flight between France and Israel		November 6, 2008
2009	Switzerland	René de Saint-Marceaux (1845–1915), sculptor of UPU Monument		October 9, 2009
2009	Venezuela	Francisco de Miranda (1750–1816) revolutionary in France and Venezuela		November 6, 2009
2010	Monaco	Paris Institute of Human Paleontology, centennial		June 1, 2010
2012	Hong Kong	Art (paintings, sculpture)		May 3, 2012
2012	United States	Miles Davis and Edith Piaf	Se-tenant pair; French issue is of two denominations	June 12, 1012
2012	Andorra French admin.	King Henry IV (1553–1610) co-prince of Andorra		November 8, 2012
2013	Germany	Élysée Treaty, 50th anniversary		January 2, 2013
2013	Vietnam	Alexandre Yersin		September 23, 2013
2014	China	Rivers (Qinhuai River and Seine)		March 27, 2014

[top]

== French Southern and Antarctic Territories ==
Year	Postal administration	Topic	Note
2007	French Polynesia; France; Mayotte; New Caledonia; Saint Pierre and Miquelon; Wallis and Futuna	Bicentennial of the Cour des Comptes (French Government Accountability Office)	Palais Cambon building, national flag, dates 1807–2007
2011	Mayotte	Ship Marion Dufresne	1 stamp

[top]

== Gambia ==
Year	Postal administration	Topic	Note
2011	Liberia; Sierra Leone	Legendary Heroes of Africa - 12 South African Jewish anti-apartheid activists	Each country issued a sheet of 4 stamps

[top]

== German Democratic Republic ==
Deutsche Post of the German Democratic Republic prior to German reunification in 1990 had released the following joint issues..

Year	Postal administration	Topic	Images	Note
1990	Austria; Berlin; West Germany; Belgium	500th anniversary of European Postal Services		

[top]

== Federal Republic of Germany ==
Deutsche Post, and its predecessor Deutsche Bundespost prior to German reunification in 1990, collaborates with the postal administrations of other countries to release joint issues on a regular basis.

Year	Postal administration	Topic	Images	Note
1973	France	10th anniversary of Franco-German Cooperation Treaty		
1983	United States	300th anniversary of German emigration to America		
1985	Denmark	30th anniversary of the Bonn-Copenhagen Accord		
1988	France	25th anniversary of Franco-German Cooperation Treaty		
1989	Ireland	Franconian apostles		
1990	Austria; Berlin; East Germany; Belgium	500th anniversary of European Postal Services		
1990	Greece	Heinrich Schliemann		
1991	Poland	750th anniversary of the Battle of Liegnitz		
1993	Czech Republic; Slovakia	600th anniversary of the death of John of Nepomuk		
1993	Austria; Switzerland	Lake Constance Region		
1993	Poland	750th anniversary of the death of Hedwig Heidrich		
1995	Ireland; Italy; San Marino; Vatican City	100th anniversary of radio		
1995	Sweden	100th anniversary of Alfred Nobel's testament		
1996	Japan	200th birthday of Philipp Franz von Siebold		
1996	Australia	100th anniversary of the death of Ferdinand von Mueller		
1997	Czech Republic; Hungary; Poland; Vatican City	1000th anniversary of the death of Adalbert, Bishop of Prague		
1997	France; Luxembourg	European Region SaarLorLux		
1998	China	World culture and natural heritage: Würzburg Palace and Puning Temple		two values with unique images
1999	South Korea	250th birthday of Johann von Goethe		
2000	Spain	Christmas		Two values
2001	Spain	Christmas		Two values with unique images, joint souvenir sheet
2002	Argentina; Brazil; France; Italy; Uruguay	FIFA World Cup champions of the 20th century		Se-tenant pairs
2003	France	40th Anniversary of German-French Cooperation Treaty		
2003	Austria	100th anniversary of the Salzach Bridge		
2004	Russia	German-Russian youth interaction in the 21st century		Joint booklet
2005	Denmark	50th anniversary of the Bonn-Copenhagen Accord		
2005	Vatican City	20th World Youth Day in Cologne		
2005	Israel	50th anniversary of diplomatic relations		
2006	Netherlands	400th birthday of Rembrandt		The Netherlands issued a sheetlet of five se-tenant stamps and label
2006	Sweden	650th anniversary of the Hanseatic League		Sweden issued a block of four se-tenant stamps
2007	Sweden	100th birthday of Astrid Lindgren		Sweden issued a souvenir sheet
2007	Latvia	UNESCO World Heritage Sites: Wismar, Stralsund and Riga		
2008	Switzerland	Rhine River Bridge at Bad Säckingen		
2008	Vatican City	Christmas		Two unique stamps
2009	United Nations	UNESCO World Heritage Sites: Luther memorials in Eisleben and Wittenberg		
2009	Austria; Hungary	20th anniversary of the opening of the Hungarian-Austrian Border		
2010	Argentina	Argentina: Country of Honor at the Frankfurt Book Fair		
2011	Japan	UNESCO World Heritage Sites: Regensburg Cathedral and Yakushi-ji Temple in Nara		
2011	Romania	Biertan/Birthälm Church		
2012	Liechtenstein	Pfälzer Hütte		
2012	Poland	UNESCO World Heritage Site - Muskauer Park		
2013	France	Elysee Treaty, 50th anniversary		
2013	South Korea	Diplomatic relations with Germany		Se-tenant pair
2015	Israel	50th anniversary of diplomatic relations		

[top]

== Greece ==
Hellenic Post (ELTA) begun releasing joint issues with other countries in 1999.

Year	Postal administration	Topic	Note
1999	Cyprus	4000 years of Hellenism	Block of 4 stamps
1999	Japan	Centenary of relations between Greece and Japan	1 stamp
2000	Australia	Sydney Olympic Games	2 stamps
2004	China	Athens 2004: From Athens to Beijing	2 stamps
2007	Spain	Joint issue Greece-Spain: Asclepios	1 miniature sheet
2007	Armenia	Joint issue Greece-Armenia	
2016	Israel	25 years of diplomatic relations	

[top]

== Greenland ==
Post Greenland has collaborated a number of times with other postal administration to release joint issues.

Year	Postal administration	Topic	Note
1963	Denmark	50th anniversary of the Bohr model	
1967	Denmark	Wedding of Margrethe II of Denmark and Henrik, Prince Consort of Denmark	
1968	Denmark	Children's charity	Semi-postal
1973	Denmark	Volcano outbreak of Heimaey	Semi-postal
1985	Denmark	25th anniversary of Ingrid of Sweden's arrival in Denmark	
1992	Denmark	25th wedding anniversary of Margrethe II of Denmark and Henrik, Prince Consort of Denmark	
2002	Denmark; Faroe Islands	Centennial of the International Council for the Exploration of the Sea	
2003	Denmark	Centennial for Danish exploration in Greenland	
2004	Canada; Norway	150th birthday of Otto Sverdrup	
2004	Denmark; Faroe Islands	Wedding of Frederik, Crown Prince of Denmark and Mary, Crown Princess of Denmark	
2007	Faroe Islands; Iceland	10th anniversary of the West Nordic Council	
2007	France	Birth centennial of Paul-Émile Victor, French polar explorer	
2008	Finland	125th anniversary of the first passing of the great ice barrier by Adolf Erik Nordenskiöld	
2013	Israel	Endangered species	Issued June 11, 2013

[top]

== Hong Kong ==
Year	Postal administration	Topic	Note
1999	Singapore	Tourism	
2001	Australia	Dragon boat races	
2002	China; Macau	2002 World Cup Soccer Tournament	Different designs. A souvenir sheet exists with stamps of the three countries
2002	Canada	Corals	
2003	Sweden	Waterfowl	
2004	China; Macau	Launch of the first crewed Chinese spacecraft	
2004	New Zealand	Rugby sevens	
2006	Portugal	Fishing villages	
2006	Austria	Fireworks	
2007	China	Handover of Hong Kong to China, 10th anniversary	
2007	Finland	Woodwork	Souvenir sheet of 2
2008	South Korea	Masks	
2009	Brazil	Soccer	
2012	Romania	Handicrafts	
2012	France	Art (paintings, sculpture)	

[top]

== Hungary ==
Magyar Posta has collaborated a number of times with other postal administration to release joint issues.

Year	Postal administration	Topic	Note
1993	Belgium	Matthias Rex	
1994	Poland	Józef Zachariasz Bem, general	
1997	Poland; Czech Republic; Germany; Vatican City	St. Adalbert	
2000	Israel	Dohány Street Synagogue, Budapest	
2001	Slovakia	Mária Valéria Bridge	
2002	Turkey		
2003	Croatia	Robe of King Ladislaus, 11th century	Issued June 13, 2003
2003	China	Book printing	Ritual of Zhou, China; Hungarian illuminated chronicle
2004	Cyprus; Czech Republic; Latvia; Lithuania; Malta; Poland; Slovakia; Slovenia; Estonia	Admission to the European Union	
2004	Austria; Israel	Theodor Herzl	
2005	Romania	George Enescu and Béla Bartók	
2009	Austria; Germany		
2009	Japan		
2010	Iran		
2011	Poland; Czech Republic; Slovakia	V4 (Visegrád Group), 20 years	
2012	Sweden	The 100th anniversary of the birth of Raoul Wallenberg	
2012	Slovenia	Folk treasures of the Mura area and the Slovene Raba region	
2016	Czech Republic; Poland; Slovakia	450th anniversary of the birth of Jan Jesenius	

[top]

== Iceland ==
Íslandspóstur has collaborated a number of times with other postal administration to release joint issues.

Year	Postal administration	Topic	Note	Date of issue
1969	Denmark; Finland; Norway; Sweden	100 years of postal cooperation of the Nordic countries		February 28
1973	Denmark; Finland; Norway; Sweden	Nordic House in Iceland		June 26
1977	Denmark; Finland; Norway; Sweden	Nature conservation		February 2
1992	Faroe Islands	500 years anniversary of the discovery of America		April 6
1994	Faroe Islands; Ireland	Discoveries and innovations		April 18
1995	Luxembourg	40th anniversary of flight connections between Iceland and Luxembourg		September 18
2000	Vatican City	1000 years of Christianity in Iceland		February 4
2007	Faroe Islands; Greenland	10th anniversary of the West Nordic Council		February 15
2011	Malta	Friendship with Malta		September 15

[top]

== India ==
India Post has collaborated a number of times with the postal administration of other countries to release a joint issue.
India Post has released 41 Joint issues until Oct 2025.

Year	Postal administration	Topic	Note / Image	Date of issue
1990	Soviet Union	Indo-Soviet friendship issue	Paintings on - Indian elephant and maharaja on a throne, India; Red Square, Moscow, Russia	August 16, 1990
1995	South Africa	India-South Africa cooperation issue	2 stamps of Mahatma Gandhi	October 2, 1995
2002	Japan	50th anniversary of diplomatic relations, Japan issued as part of series 'Japan and South Asia in 21st Century'	Japanese stamp design has a markedly different design than the Indian issue. India issued two stamps depicting the classical dances Kathakali of India and Kabuki of Japan, while Japan issued a single stamp of the Taj Mahal For few months now, there is a discussion going on if the stamps issued in 2002 by India Post and Japan Post with the title “50th Anniversary of Diplomatic Relations between India and Japan” is really a joint issue or not. Some one filed an application to India Post under the Right to information (RTI) act of 2005, to confirm the joint issue status and to provide a copy of memorandum of understanding signed between both postal departments. Indian Post provided the following information about the issue presently referenced in the catalogue under [P20020412a]: 1) This is not a joint issue 2) since it was not a joint issue they could not provide a copy of memorandum of understanding between India Post and Japan Post (see copy of answer below).	April 26, 2002
2003	France	Fine Arts	A rooster from the 15th-century French work - Heures a l'usage de Rome; A peacock from 19th-century Indian jewellery crafted in the Meenakari tradition	November 29, 2003
2003	South Korea	30th anniversary of diplomatic relations	Jantar Mantar, Jaipur, India; Cheomseongdae, Gyeongju, South Korea	December 10, 2003
2004	Iran	Philosopher Poets	Indian mystic poet and saint Kabir; Iranian poet Hafez	August 16, 2004
2006	Cyprus	Folk Dances	Nati Dance of Himachal Pradesh, India and Folk Dance of Cyprus	April 12, 2006
2006	Mongolia	50 years of diplomatic relations	Ancient art: horse - 20th-century bronze replica of the equestrian deity Rao Dev from Bastar, Madhya Pradesh, India; A Bronze Age sculpture of a horse from Mörön, Khövsgöl Aimag, Mongolia	September 11, 2006
2008	China	Temples	Maha Bodhi Temple, India; White Horse Temple, China	July 11, 2008
2009	Philippines	60 years of diplomatic relations	Gangetic dolphin and Butanding	November 16, 2009
2010	Mexico	60 years of diplomatic relations	Folk Dances - Kalbelia, India and Jarabe Tapatío, Mexico	December 15, 2010
2012	Israel	20 years of diplomatic relations	Festival of Lights - Diwali and Hanukkah	November 5, 2012
2014	Slovenia	25th anniversary of the Convention on the Rights of the Child	Universal Children's Day, India, Slovenia	November 28, 2014
2015	France	50 years of space co-operation.	Satellites SARAL and Megha-Tropiques	April 10, 2015
2015	Singapore	Presidential Residences	The Istana and Rashtrapati Bhavan	November 24, 2015
2016	United Nations	Solidarity Movement for Gender Equality	'HeForShe' Campaign	March 8, 2016
2017	Portugal	500 Years Of Portugal-India Interaction: Folk Dances	Dandiya Dance and Pauliteiros de Miranda	March 8, 2017
2017	Belarus	25th Anniversary of Establishing Diplomatic Relations between India and Belarus.	National Emblem, India, Belarus	September 12, 2017
2017	Canada	Canada's 150th anniversary and Diwali festival.	Lamp (Deep), Diwali, the Festival of Lights	September 21, 2017
2017	Russia	Folk Dances	Beryozka and Bhavai	October 10, 2017
2017	Papua New Guinea	National Birds	Raggiana Bird of Paradise and Blue Peafowl	December 31, 2017
2018	Vietnam	Friendship with India: Ancient Religious Structures	Pho Minh Pagoda and Sanchi Stupa	January 25, 2018
2018	Iran	Friendship with India: Trade Ports	Shahid Behesti Port and Deendayal Port, Kandla	February 17, 2018
2018	South Africa	Anniversaries and Jubilees	Nelson Mandela and Mahatma Gandhi	July 26, 2018
2018	South Africa	20 Years of Strategic Partnership	Oliver Reginald Tambo and Deendayal Upadhyaya Note: South African version not released due to poor printing quality	June 7, 2018
2018	Armenia	Folk Dances	Hov Arek and Manipuri	August 29, 2018
2018	Serbia	70th Anniversary of Diplomatic Relations	Nikola Tesla and Swami Vivekananda	September 15, 2018
2019	South Korea	Famous People	Royalty, Queen Heo	July 30, 2019
2021	Bangladesh	50th Anniversary of Diplomatic Relations	Parliaments and Monuments	March 27, 2021
2021	Germany	70th Anniversary of Diplomatic Relations	Flags, Dances, Structures	June 10, 2021
2022	United Arab Emirates	50th Anniversary of UAE's formation & 75th Year of India's Independence	Flags, Palace	Feb 18, 2022
2023	Luxembourg	75 Years of Friendship	Flags, Artist Amar Nath Sehgal	Mar 15, 2023
2023	Vietnam	50 Years of Diplomatic Relations	Flags, Sports	Oct 16, 2023
2023	Mauritius	75 Years of Diplomatic Relations	Birds	Nov 2, 2023
2023	Oman	Celebrating Oman & India's Friendship	Folk Dance	Dec 15, 2023
2024	Romania	75 Years of Diplomatic Relations	Folk Costumes	Sep 17, 2024
2025	Israel	Purnim & Holi Festival	Festivals	Feb 11, 2025
2025	Portugal	50 Years of Re-establishment of Diplomatic Relations	Folk Dance	Apr 7, 2025
2025	Maldives	60 Years of Diplomatic Relations	Traditional Boats	Jul 25, 2025
2025	Philippines	75 Years of Diplomatic Relations	National Flowers	Aug 5, 2025
2025	Mongolia	75 Years of Diplomatic Relations	Traditional Dance & Drama	Oct 14, 2025

India Post planned joint issues that did not materialize.

Year	Postal administration	Topic	Note
2012	Switzerland		
2020	China	70th Anniversary of the establishment of diplomatic ties	Military standoff along the Line of Actual Control (LAC) in eastern Ladakh.
2022	Turkmenistan Kazakhstan Kyrgyzstan Tajikistan Uzbekistan	30th Anniversary of Diplomatic Relations	Central Asia Summit
2022	Thailand	75th Anniversary of Diplomatic Relations	Thailand 2022 Stamp Programme
2023	Sri Lanka	75th Anniversary of Independence from British Rule, Theme - Parliaments	Joint Issue
2023	Hungary	Nov 2023 - The Art of Amrita Sher-Gil	Hungary 2023 Stamp Programme Amrita110 Project

[top]

== Iran ==
Iran Post has collaborated a number of times with the postal administration of other countries to release a joint issue.

Year	Postal administration	Topic	Note	Date of issue
2004	India	Poets	Indian mystic poet and saint Kabir; Iranian poet Hafez	August 16, 2004

[top]

== Ireland ==
The Irish Post Office has collaborated several times with the postal administration of another country to release a joint issue.

Year	Postal administration	Topic	Note	Date of issue
1981	United States	James Hoban Commemoration	White House Architect	September 29, 1981
1984	United States	John McCormack	Tenor	June 6, 1984
1989	West Germany	Irish Franconian Apostles	St. Kilian, St. Colman and St. Totnan	June 15, 1989
1995	Belgium	250th anniversary of the Battle of Fontenoy		May 15, 1995
1995	Germany; Italy; San Marino; Vatican City	100th anniversary of Radio		June 8, 1995
1997	Mexico	150th anniversary of the San Patricio; Saint Patrick's Battalion		September 12, 1997
1999	United States	Irish migration to the United States	150th anniversary of Ireland's Great Famine	February 26, 1999
1999	Australia	Polly Woodside	Three-masted, iron-hulled barque launched in Belfast in 1885	March 19, 1999
2004	Sweden	Nobel Prize in Literature	William Butler Yeats, George Bernard Shaw, Samuel Beckett and Seamus Heaney	October 1, 2004
2005	Canada	Biosphere Reserves	Killarney National Park & Waterton Lakes National Park featuring the Saskatoon berry	April 22, 2005
2008	Spain	Popular dancing	Irish dancer & flamenco dancer	November 7, 2008
2010	Chile	John Mackenna (1771–1814), Bernardo O'Higgins (1778–1842)	Irishmen Involved in Chilean Independence	October 28, 2010

[top]

== Israel ==
Israel Post has collaborated a number of times with other postal administration to release a joint issue.

Year	Postal administration	Topic	Note	Date of issue
1993	Poland	50th anniversary of Warsaw Ghetto Uprising		18Apr1993
1996	United States	Hanukkah	Hanukkah stamp	22Nov1996
1997	Czech Republic	Jewish Monuments in Prague		30Apr1997
1997	Russia	Alexander Pushkin's "Eugene Onegin"	Translated by Abraham Shlonsky	19Nov1997
1999	Belgium	Painting by James Ensor	My Favorite Room	16May1999
1999	Slovakia	Ceramic Urns	Located in Museum of Jewish Culture, Bratislava, Slovakia	23Nov1999
2000	Hungary	Dohány Street Synagogue, Budapest		19Sep2000
2001	Georgia	Shota Rustaveli, Georgian national poet		3Sep2001
2004	Italy	Centennial of the Great Synagogue of Rome		20May2004
2004	Austria; Hungary	Centennial of death of Theodor Herzl		6Jul2004
2005	Germany	40 years of diplomatic relations		3Nov2005
2008	United Nations	International Holocaust Remembrance Day	Includes stamps for New York, Vienna and Geneva	27Jan2008
2008	France	Commemorating first flight between France and Israel		6Nov2008
2009	Poland	Berek Joselewicz, Polish Freedom Fighter	Souvenir sheet - painting by Juliusz Kossak	22Apr2009
2009	Romania	Yiddish theatre - Iași, Romania		26Nov2009
2010	Canada	Friendship, 60th anniversary		14Apr2010
2010	Austria	Simon Wiesenthal, Nazi hunter		14Jun2010
2010	Vatican City	Pope's visit to Israel		15Nov2010
2012	India	20 years of diplomatic relations	Festival of Lights - Diwali, India; Israel, Hanukkah	November 5, 2012
2012	China	Diplomatic relations, 20th anniversary		20Mar2012
2012	Nepal	Dead Sea, Mount Everest, flags of Israel and Nepal		4Sep2012
2013	Australia	Battle of Beersheba in WW I		16May2013
2013	Greenland	Endangered species		11Jun2013
2013	Uruguay	José Gurvich, "The Annunciation of Sarah"		29Oct2013
2014	Malta	Knights Hospitaller halls		28Jan2014
2014	Thailand	60 Years of Friendship	Mangosteen & pomegranate	6May2014
2014	Ecuador	Orchids	(Stamp never issued by Ecuador)	14Dec2014
2015	Philippines	Philippine rescue of Jews in Holocaust		27Jan2015
2015	Germany	50 Years Diplomatic Relations		5Jul2015
2015	Vatican City	Church of the Holy Sepulchre, Jerusalem		2Sep2015
2016	Greece	25 Years Diplomatic Relations		9Feb2016
2016	Spain	30 years of diplomatic relations	Bridge of Strings, Jerusalem	19Apr2016
2016	Bulgaria	Bird Migration		13Sep2016
2017	Portugal	Dolphin research		4Apr2017
2017	Croatia	20 years of diplomatic relations	Flowers	4Sep2017
2017	Russia	Gorny Convent, Ein Karem, Israel		14Nov2017

[top]

== Italy ==
Year	Postal administration	Topic	Note	Date of issue
1992	United States	Discovery of America, 500th anniversary		April 24, 1992
1992	Portugal; Spain; United States	Voyages of Christopher Columbus	6 souvenir sheets	May 22, 1992
1994	San Marino	Basilica of St. Mark, 900th anniversary		October 8, 1994
1995	Germany; Ireland; San Marino; Vatican City	100th anniversary of Radio		June 8, 1995
1995	Brazil; Portugal	St Anthony of Padua		June 13, 1995
1996	San Marino	Marco Polo's return from China 700th anniversary	China '96 Philatelic Exhibition	March 22, 1996
1996	France; Monaco	RAMOGE agreement between France, Italy and Monaco, 20th anniversary		May 14, 1996
1997	Belgium	Queen Paola of Belgium, 60th birthday		May 23, 1997
1997	Canada	John Cabot's voyage to Canada, 500th anniversary		June 24, 1997
1998	Venezuela	Christopher Columbus Landing in Venezuela; Exploration of Amerigo Vespucci		August 12, 1998
1998	San Marino; Vatican City	Italia '98 Intl. Philatelic Exhibition	Pictured: John Paul II	October 23, 1998
1999	Finland	Christmas		November 5, 1999
2002	Argentina; Brazil; France; Germany; Uruguay	FIFA World Cup Champions of the 20th century	Se-tenant pairs	November 29, 2002
2003	Belgium	Europalia Italia Festival, Belgium		September 13, 2003
2004	France; United Nations	World day of Road safety	3 UN issues (New York, Geneva, Vienna)	April 7, 2004
2004	Thailand	Rome Bangkok Foundation	Souvenir sheet	April 21, 2004
2004	Israel	Centennial of the Great Synagogue of Rome		May 20, 2004
2004	Pakistan	50th anniversary of first ascent of K-2	Stamp designs are different	July 31, 2004
2005	Vatican City	Ramification of Modifications to Concordat,	Set of 2	June 9, 2005
2006	San Marino	Two Republics Philatelic Exhibition		April 5, 2006
2009	San Marino; Vatican City	Italian Language Day		October 21, 2009
2009	Bulgaria	Diplomatic relations, 130th anniversary	Souvenir sheet	October 22, 2009
2011	Russia	Russian-Italian Year of Culture		December 10, 2011
2011	San Marino	Anita Garibaldi and Giuseppe Garibaldi; First Tower of San Marino	Souvenir sheet	June 4, 2011
2012	Vatican City	Battle of the Milvian Bridge, 1700th anniversary	Souvenir sheet	September 13, 2012
2020	Slovakia	National Philatelic Exhibition MILANOFIL 2020		March 27, 2020

[top]

== Japan ==
Japan Post has collaborated a number of times with the postal administration of other countries to release a joint issue.

Year	Postal administration	Topic	Note	Date of issue
1960	United States	Centennial of Treaty of Amity and Commerce		
2002	India	50th anniversary of diplomatic relations, part of series 'Japan and South Asia in 21st Century'	Japanese stamp design has a markedly different design than the Indian issue. India issued two stamps depicting the classical dances Kathakali of India and Kabuki of Japan, while Japan issued a single stamp of the Taj Mahal	April 12, 2002
2015	United States	Gifts of Friendship	Stamp panes featuring U.S. designs (cherry blossoms and the Lincoln Memorial, and dogwood blossoms and the U.S. Capitol) and Japanese designs (the National Diet Building framed with cherry blossoms, and the clock tower outside the National Diet Building behind a foreground of white dogwoods). The U.S. pane shows the two U.S. designs at upper left and the two Japanese designs and at bottom left, with eight additional stamps (four of each of the U.S. designs) on the right. The Japanese pane shows the two Japanese designs at upper left and the two U.S. designs at bottom left, with six additional stamps on the right in three designs (two of each) depicting flowering tree blossoms.	April 10, 2015

[top]

== Latvia ==
Latvijas Pasts has collaborated a number of times with other postal administration to release a joint issue.

Year	Postal administration	Topic	Images	Note
1992	Estonia; Lithuania; Sweden	Mare Balticum. Nature conservation of the Baltic Sea		2x 4 stamps booklet
1995	Estonia; Lithuania	Via Baltica		
1997	Estonia; Lithuania	Old ships of the Baltic Sea		
1999	Estonia; Lithuania	10th anniversary of the Baltic Way		
2001	Estonia; Lithuania	Nature of the Baltic Sea coast		1 stamp, 3 stamp s/s
2004	Cyprus; Czech Republic; Estonia; Hungary; Lithuania; Malta; Poland; Slovakia; Slovenia	Admission to the European Union		
2006	Kazakhstan	Costume jewelry		
2007	Germany	World Heritage Sites - Riga, Stralsund and Wismar		
2008	Estonia; Lithuania	The highest orders of the Baltic states		
2012	Estonia; Lithuania	Railway bridges		

[top]

== Lithuania ==
Lithuania Post has collaborated a number of times with other postal administration to release a joint issue.

Year	Postal administration	Topic	Images	Note
1992	Estonia; Latvia; Sweden	Birds of the Baltic Shores		
1995	Estonia; Latvia	Via Baltica Highway Project		
1997	Estonia; Latvia	Old Ships of the Baltic Sea		
1999	Estonia; Latvia	10th anniversary of the Baltic Way		
2001	Estonia; Latvia	Baltic Coast Landscapes		
2004	Cyprus; Czech Republic; Estonia; Hungary; Latvia; Malta; Poland; Slovakia; Slovenia	Admission to the European Union		Different Designs
2007	Belarus	Birds		Horizontal Pair
2008	Estonia; Latvia	Highest Orders of the Baltic States		
2012	Estonia; Latvia	Railway bridges		

[top]

== Malaysia ==
Year	Postal administration	Topic	Image featured	Date of issue
2002	China	Rare flowers	Couroupita guianensis aubl and camellia nitidissima	February 5, 2002
2002	Singapore	Tropical birds	White-bellied woodpecker, black-naped oriole, red-throated sunbird and Asian fairy-bluebird	June 27, 2002
2007	Brunei	Unique marine life	Leaf scorpionfish, oranged-striped triggerfish, chambered nautilus and spotted boxfish	February 6, 2007
2007	Brunei Cambodia Indonesia Laos Myanmar Philippines Singapore Thailand Vietnam	ASEAN 40th anniversary	Feature buildings from each of the 10 member states: Secretriat Building, National Museum of Cambodia, Fatahillah Museum, Lao typical house, The Malayan Railway Headquarters Building, Yangon Post Office, Malacañang Palace, National Museum of Singapore, Vimanmek Mansion and Presidential Palace	August 8, 2007
2010	South Korea	The 50th anniversary of Malaysia-Korea diplomatic relations	Korean tiger and Malayan tiger	February 23, 2010
2011	Indonesia	Joint issue	Malaysia's National Monument, Proclamation Monument, Malaysia's first currency issued after merdeka, Malaysia's first stamp issued after merdeka, Surakarta military stamp, Oeang Republik Indonesia banknote, red junglefowl and green junglefowl	August 8, 2011
2014	Hong Kong	Local food	Nasi lemak, Satay, Poon choi and egg waffle	October 9, 2014
2015	Thailand	Marine creatures	Phyllorhiza punctata, Hypselodoris bullockii, Hymenocera picta and Trapezia areolata	June 8, 2015
2015	Brunei Cambodia Indonesia Laos Myanmar Philippines Singapore Thailand Vietnam	ASEAN community	Flags of the member states forming a five petalled flower	August 8, 2015
2024	China	50th Anniversary of Malaysia-China Diplomatic Relations	Pine trees and merbau trees	May 31, 2024
2024	Singapore	100th Anniversary of Johor Causeway	Views of the Causeway from Malaysia and Singapore during the past and present	June 28, 2024

[top]

== Malta ==
MaltaPost has collaborated a number of times with other postal administration to release a joint issue.

Year	Postal administration	Topic	Note	Date of issue
2004	Cyprus; Czech Republic; Estonia; Hungary; Latvia; Lithuania; Poland; Slovakia; Slovenia	Admission to the European Union	set of 2 (1 with common design)	May 1, 2004
2005	Denmark	200th birth anniversary of Hans Christian Andersen	set of 4	March 3, 2005
2007	Vatican City	Christmas 2007	set of 3	November 20, 2007
2008	Cyprus	Adoption of Euro	1 miniature sheet of 2 stamps	January 1, 2008
2010	Gibraltar	100 ton gun	1 miniature sheet of 4 stamps	February 19, 2010
2011	Iceland	Fishing villages	1 miniature sheet of 1 stamp	September 15, 2011
2013	Curaçao	Harbours	1 miniature sheet of 1 stamp	August 20, 2013
2014	Israel	Knights Hospitaller halls	Single stamp	January 28, 2014
2014	Cyprus; Egypt; Greece; Jordan; Lebanon; Libya; Morocco; Palestine; Slovenia; Syria	Postal Union for the Mediterranean	Single stamp This has been described as an omnibus issue	June 9, 2014
2020	Slovakia	Viticulture		October 24, 2020

[top]

== Mayotte ==
Year	Postal administration	Topic	Note
2007	French Southern and Antarctic Lands; French Polynesia; France; New Caledonia; Saint Pierre and Miquelon; Wallis and Futuna	Bicentennial of the Cour des Comptes (French Government Accountability Office)	Palais Cambon building, national flag, dates 1807–2007
2011	French Southern and Antarctic Lands	Ship Marion Dufresne	1 stamp

[top]

== Mexico ==
Correos de México, the national postal service of Mexico, has collaborated a number of times with the postal administration of other countries to release a joint issue.

Year	Postal administration	Topic	Note	Date of issue
2010	India	60 years of diplomatic relations	Folk dances - Kalbelia, India; Jarabe Tapatío, Mexico	December 15, 2010

[top]

== Monaco ==
Year	Postal administration	Topic	Note
1993	United States	Princess Grace	Actress Grace Kelly
1996	France; Italy	RAMOGE agreement between France, Italy and Monaco, 20th anniversary	
2010	France	Human Paleontology Institute-Paris, Centennial	
2012	French Southern and Antarctic Lands	Prince of Monaco Islands	Souvenir sheet
2012	Belgium	Art by Jan Breughel; Cabaret on the Banks of the River	Souvenir sheet

[top]

== Mongolia ==
Mongol Post, the national postal service of Mongolia, has collaborated with some postal administration of other countries to release a joint issue.

Year	Postal administration	Topic	Note	Date of issue
2006	India	50 years of diplomatic relations	Ancient art: horse : 20th-century bronze replica of the equestrian deity Rao Dev from Bastar, Madhya Pradesh, India; A Bronze Age sculpture of a horse from Mörön, Khövsgöl Aimag, Mongolia	September 11, 2006

[top]

== Nepal ==
Year	Postal administration	Topic	Note	Date of issue
2012	Israel	Mount Everest and the Dead Sea, highest and lowest points on Earth's surface		

[top]

== Netherlands ==
Year	Postal administration	Topic	Note	Date of issue
1959	Belgium Luxembourg	10 years of NATO		
1964	Belgium Luxembourg	20 years of the Benelux		
1969	Belgium Luxembourg	25 years of the Benelux		
1974	Belgium Luxembourg	30 years of the Benelux		
1982	USA	Bicentennial of Diplomatic Recognition		April 20, 1982
1989	Belgium	150 years of Limburg		
2000	Belgium	Celebrating the UEFA European Championship in 2000		
2006	Germany	400th birthday of Rembrandt		July 15, 2006
2017	Luxembourg	Multilaterale Hertogpost		August 25, 2017

[top]

== Norway ==
Posten Norge has collaborated a number of times with other postal administration to release joint issues.

Year	Postal administration	Topic	Note	Date
1969	Denmark; Finland; Iceland; Sweden	100 years of postal cooperation of the Nordic countries		February 28
1973	Denmark; Finland; Iceland; Sweden	Nordic House in Iceland		June 26
1977	Denmark; Finland; Iceland; Sweden	Nature conservation		February 2
1987	Somalia	Red Cross Rehabilitation Centre in Mogadishu		May 8
2004	Canada; Greenland	150th birthday of Otto Sverdrup		March 26

[top]

== Pakistan ==
Pakistan Post has collaborated with other countries to release several joint issues.

Year	Postal administration	Topic	Note
1965	Iran; Turkey	1st anniversary RCD	Hands holding Book, and Flags of Pakistan, Turkey & Iran
1969	Iran; Turkey	5th anniversary RCD	Mughal miniature (Pakistan), Safavi miniature (Iran), Ottoman miniature (Turkey)
1970	Iran; Turkey	6th anniversary RCD	Saiful Malook lake (Pakistan), Seeyo-se-Pol Bridge (Iran), View from Fethiye (Turkey)
1971	Iran; Turkey	7th anniversary RCD	Badshahi Mosque (Pakistan), Chahar Bagh School (Iran), Selimiya Mosque (Turkey)
1972	Iran; Turkey	8th anniversary RCD	Paintings; fisherman (Turkey), Persian woman (Iran), Young man (Pakistan)
1973	Iran; Turkey	9th anniversary RCD	Statue of man (Iran), Main Street Moenjodaro (Pakistan), Mausoleum of Antiochus (Turkey)
1974	Iran; Turkey	10th anniversary RCD	Handicrafts carpets from all three countries
1975	Iran; Turkey	11th anniversary RCD	Handicrafts; camel skin vase (Pakistan), tiles (Iran), porcelain vase (Turkey)
1976	Iran; Turkey	12th anniversary RCD	Portraits; Quaid-i-Azam (Pakistan), Raza Shah (Iran), Kemal Atatürk (Turkey)
1977	Iran; Turkey	13th anniversary RCD	Human face vase (Turkey), toy bullock cart (Pakistan), buff earth ware (Iran)
1978	Iran; Turkey	14th anniversary RCD	Roses
1979	Iran; Turkey	15th anniversary RCD	Paintings
1990	Indonesia	IPECC	Historical places and people
1994	Indonesia	IPECC	Handicrafts pottery
2002	Kyrgyzstan	10th anniversary of diplomatic relations	Flags
2004	Italy	50th anniversary of first ascent of K-2	

[top]

== Peru ==
Serpost, the national postal service of Peru, has collaborated with some postal administration of other countries to release a joint issue.

Year	Postal administration	Topic	Note	Date of issue
2013	India	50th anniversary of diplomatic relations	Taj Mahal, India; Machu Picchu, Peru	March 19, 2013 (However, India is yet to release its set of stamps.)

[top]

== Philippines ==
Philippine Postal Corporation, the national postal service of the Philippines, has collaborated with some postal administration of other countries to release a joint issue.

Year	Postal administration	Topic	Note	Date of issue
2009	India	60 years of diplomatic relations	Gangetic dolphin Butanding	November 16, 2009
2015	Israel	Rescue of Jews during Holocaust		

[top]

== Poland ==
Year	Postal administration	Topic	Note
1991	Germany	750th anniversary Battle of Legnica	
1993	Israel	50th anniversary Warsaw Ghetto Uprising	
1993	Germany	St. Jadwiga (Hedwig)	750th death anniversary
1998	Belgium	Mniszech Palace (Belgian Embassy in Warsaw)	
1998	Sweden	Sigismund III Vasa (1566–1632)	King of Sweden and Poland
1999	France	Frédéric Chopin composer	150th death anniversary
1999	Ukraine	nature conservation cooperation	Se-tenant pair
2000	Vatican City	Pope John Paul II, 80th birthday	
2002	Chile	Ignacy Domeyko (1802–1889), mineralogist	
2002	Vatican City	Pontificate of John Paul II, 25th anniversary	Sheet of 25 plus silver foil self-adhesive
2004	Czech Republic; Cyprus; Estonia; Latvia; Lithuania; Hungary; Malta; Slovakia; Slovenia	Admission to the European Union	Single stamp
2006	China	Gold and silver artefacts	June 20, 2006
2009	Israel	Berek Joselewicz, freedom fighter	
2012	Germany	UNESCO World Heritage Site - Muskauer Park	
2016	Czech Republic; Hungary; Slovakia	450th anniversary of the birth of Jan Jesenius	
2020	Slovakia	100th anniversary of the birth of Pope John Paul II	

[top]

== Portugal ==
Year	Postal administration	Topic	Note
2017	Israel	Dolphin research	Issued April 4, 2017

[top]

== Romania ==
Year	Postal administration	Topic	Images	Note
2006	Hungary	Famous Composers, Romania		Issued June 8, 2006
2009	Israel	Yiddish theater, Iasi, Romania		
2011	Germany	Biertan/Birthälm Church		
2018	France	General Berthelot on the Romanian front		Issued November 27, 2018
2019	Vatican City	The Visit of Pope Francisc in Romania		Issued May 31, 2019

[top]

== Russia ==
Russian Post has collaborated a number of times with other postal administration to release a joint issue.

Year	Postal administration	Topic	Images	Note
1992	United States	Space Exploration		
1992	Sweden	Christmas. Russian icons		
1993	Finland	Septcentennial of Vyborg		
1993	Denmark	500 years of diplomatic relations		
1994	Belarus; Ukraine	50th anniversary of the liberation of Russia, Belarus and Ukraine		
1995	Finland	Nature conservation		
1996	Cyprus	Art and culture of the Eastern Orthodox Church		
1997	Israel	International Pushkin Year - Translation of Eugene Onegin in Hebrew by Abraham Shlonsky		
1999	China	Red deer		
1999	Switzerland	Bicentennial of Suvorov's Italian and Swiss expedition		
2000	Belarus; Ukraine	Bimillennial of Christianity		
2000	Estonia	Fish of the Lake Peipsi-Pihkva - zander, European smelt		
2001	Armenia	Bicentennial of Ivan Lazarev's death - the founder of Lazarev Institute of Oriental Languages		
2002	Kazakhstan	Rare birds - demoiselle crane, great black-headed gull.		
2003	Belgium	150th anniversary of Russian-Belgian diplomatic relations		
2003	Iran	Nature conservation of the Caspian Sea		
2004	Germany	Russian-German intercultural learning of the youth in the 21st century		
2005	Belarus	Fauna		
2005	North Korea	Animals of the Far East		
2013	Algeria	The 50th anniversary of establishment of diplomatic relations		
2013	Azerbaijan	Pres. Heydar Aliyev (1923–2003), Order of St, Andrew the Apostle		
2013	Bulgaria	135th anniversary of the Russo-Turkish War (1877–1878)		Souvenir sheet
2014	Bulgaria	Diplomatic relations, 135th anniversary		
2017	Israel	Gorny Convent, Ein Karem, Israel		Issued November 14, 2017

[top]

== Slovakia ==
Year	Postal administration	Topic	Note
1993	Czech Republic; Germany	600th anniversary of the death of John of Nepomuk	
1993	Czech Republic	Arrival of St Cyril and St Methodius, 1130th anniversary	
1993	Czech Republic; Sweden	Painting The Baroque Chair by Nemes	
1999	Israel	Ceramic Urns	
2004	Cyprus; Czech Republic; Estonia; Latvia; Lithuania; Hungary; Malta; Poland; Slovenia	Admission to the European Union	Single stamp
2008	Czech Republic	Karel Plicka	Miniature sheet
2011	Czech Republic; Hungary; Poland	Visegrád Group - 20th anniversary	
2013	Bulgaria; Czech Republic; Vatican City	Mission of Sts. Cyril and Methodius to Slavic Lands 1150th anniversary	Souvenir sheet
2016	Czech Republic; Hungary; Poland	450th anniversary of the birth of Jan Jesenius	
2019	Slovenia	Astronomical clock	March 22, 2019
2019	China	75th anniversary of diplomatic relationships	October 7, 2019
2019	Czech Republic	30th anniversary of the Velvet revolution	November 13, 2019
2020	Italy	National Philatelic Exhibition MILANOFIL 2020	March 27, 2020
2020	Poland	100th anniversary of the birth of Pope John Paul II	May 18, 2020
2020	Malta	Viticulture	October 24, 2020

[top]

== Slovenia ==
Pošta Slovenije has collaborated a number of times with other postal administration to release a joint issue.

Year	Postal administration	Topic	Note
2004	Cyprus; Czech Republic; Latvia; Lithuania; Malta; Poland; Slovakia; Hungary; Estonia	Admission to the European Union	
2008	Croatia	Stone buildings	
2012	Hungary	Folk treasures of the Mura area and the Slovene Raba region	
2013	Austria	Postojna Cave, the First Underground Post Office	
2014	India	25th anniversary of the Convention on the Rights of the Child	
2019	Slovakia	Astronomical clock	March 22, 2019

[top]

== South Africa ==
South African Post Office has collaborated with some postal administration of other countries to release a joint issue.

Year	Postal administration	Topic	Note	Date of issue
1995	India	India-South Africa cooperation issue	2 stamps of Mahatma Gandhi	October 2, 1995

[top]

== South Korea ==
Korea Post has collaborated a number of times with the postal administration of other countries to release a joint issue, mainly commemorating diplomatic relations.

Year	Postal administration	Topic	Note	Date of issue
1996	China	Korea-China submarine fiber-optic cable system	submarine fiber-optic cable and flags	February 8, 1996
1999	Germany	250th birthday of Johann von Goethe	Portrait of Johann von Goethe	August 12, 1999
2002	China	2002-The Year of People's Exchange between Korea-China	Taekwondo and Wushu	November 20, 2002
2002	Vietnam	10th anniversary of diplomatic relations	Dabotap and One Pillar Pagoda	December 21, 2002
2003	India	30th anniversary of diplomatic relations	Cheomseongdae and Jantar Mantar	December 10, 2003
2007	Singapore	30th anniversary of diplomatic relations	Wedding robes	March 30, 2007
2008	Thailand	50th anniversary of diplomatic relations	Changdeokgung Juhamnu and Grand Palace Phra Thinang Chakri Maha Prasat	October 1, 2008
2008	Hong Kong	Traditional masks	Chwibari mask and Big Head Buddha mask	November 6, 2008
2009	Philippines	60th anniversary of diplomatic relations	Korean traditional cow play and Panagbenga Festival	March 3, 2009
2009	Mongolia; Kazakhstan	Traditional earrings	Earrings from 5th–6th centuries Silla, 18th–19th centuries Mongolia and 2nd century BC–1st century AD Kazakhstan	June 12, 2009
2009	Brazil	50th anniversary of diplomatic relations	Incheon Bridge and Octávio Frias de Oliveira Bridge	October 30, 2009
2010	Malaysia	50th anniversary of diplomatic relations	Siberian tiger and Malayan tiger	February 23, 2010
2010	United Arab Emirates	30th anniversary of diplomatic relations	Gyeongbokgung Amisan chimney and Barjeel	June 18, 2010
2011	Portugal	50th anniversary of diplomatic relations	Turtle ship and Nau ship	April 15, 2011
2011	Australia	50th anniversary of diplomatic relations	Haegeum and Didgeridoo	October 28, 2011
2012	Mexico	50th anniversary of diplomatic relations	Gray whales	January 26, 2012
2012	Colombia	50th anniversary of diplomatic relations	Ginseng and Coffee	March 9, 2012
2013	Peru	50th anniversary of diplomatic relations	Seongsan Ilchulbong and Machu Picchu	April 1, 2013
2013	Slovakia	20th anniversary of diplomatic relations	Pansori and dancers from the Lúčnica ensemble	May 31, 2013
2013	Germany	130th anniversary of diplomatic relations	Gyeongbokgung Hyangwonjeong and Bayreuth Sun Temple	June 25, 2013
2013	Indonesia	40th anniversary of diplomatic relations	Bukcheong sajanoreum and Banteng bull play	September 17, 2013
2014	Uruguay	50th anniversary of diplomatic relations	Nongak and Candombe	October 7, 2014
2015	Bolivia	50th anniversary of diplomatic relations	Scaly-sided merganser and Swallow-tailed cotinga	April 24, 2015
2016	France	130th anniversary of diplomatic relations	Celadon Openwork Incense Burner and Pippin's reliquary	June 3, 2016
2017	Sri Lanka	40th anniversary of diplomatic relations	Chunaengjeon and Kandyan dance	November 14, 2017
2018	Iran	Lion artifacts	Lion-shaped Incense Burner Cover from Silla and the Golden Rhyton from Achaemenid Empire	October 23, 2018
2019	India	Heo Hwang-ok	Portrait of Heo Hwang-ok, Tomb of Queen Consort of King Suro and Pasa Stone Pagoda	July 30, 2019
2019	Croatia	National parks	Seoraksan National Park and Northern Velebit National Park	August 29, 2019

[top]

== Spain ==
Year	Postal administration	Topic	Note
2016	Israel	Bridge of Strings, Jerusalem	

[top]

== Sweden ==
Posten AB has collaborated a number of times with other postal administration to release a joint issue.

Year	Postal administration	Topic	Date	Note
1969	Denmark; Finland; Iceland; Norway	100 years of postal cooperation of the Nordic countries		
1973	Denmark; Finland; Iceland; Norway	Nordic House in Iceland		
1977	Denmark; Finland; Iceland; Norway	Nature conservation		
1983	United States	Bicentennial of Treaty of Amity and Commerce		
1985	Denmark	900th anniversary of Canute IV of Denmark's gift to the Diocese of Lund		
1986	United States	International Philatelic Exhibition STOCKHOLMIA '86		
1988	Finland; United States	350th anniversary of the founding of New Sweden		
1992	Estonia; Latvia; Lithuania	Mare Balticum. nature conservation of the Baltic Sea		
1992	Russia	Christmas. Russian icons		
1994	France	Cultural relations of Sweden and France		
1994	Finland	1994 Swedish-Finnish Country Games in Athletics		
1995	Denmark	450th birthday of Tycho Brahe		
1995	Germany	Centennial of Alfred Nobel's will		
1996	Czech Republic; Slovakia	Paintings from Moderna Museet		
1997	China	Pheasants		
1997	Switzerland	Nobel Prize recipients		
1998	Poland	Sigismund III Vasa (1566–1632)		King of Sweden and Poland
1999	Singapore	Butterflies		
1999	Belgium	Belgian recipients of the Nobel Peace Prize		
2000	Denmark	Inauguration of the Oresund Bridge		
2001	United States	Centennial of the Nobel Prize	March 22	
2001	Australia	Daniel Solander	August 16	
2002	New Zealand	Handicraft	May 2	
2002	Thailand	Royal palaces	October 5	
2003	Spain	Spanish recipients of the Nobel Prize in Medicin	March 20	
2003	Hong Kong	Waterfowl	October 4	
2004	Ireland	Irish recipients of the Nobel Prize in Literature	October 1	
2005	Norway	Centennial of the separation of Norway from Sweden. Inauguration of the Svinesund Bridge	May 27	
2005	United States	Centennial birthday of Greta Garbo	September 23	
2006	Finland	Suomenlinna	May 4	
2006	Germany	650 years of the Hanseatic League	September 7	
2007	Germany	Centennial birthday of Astrid Lindgren	November 8	
2010	Canada	Animals of the sea	May 13	
2010	Ireland	The art of engraving	August 26	
2012	Hungary	The 100th anniversary of the birth of Raoul Wallenberg		
2015	United States	Ingrid Bergman		

[top]

== Thailand ==
Thailand Post has collaborated a number of times with other postal administration to release a joint issue.

Year	Postal administration	Topic	Note	Date of issue
1995	China	50th Anniversary of Diplomatic Relations	Two elephant herds were drinking water in the river originating from the same source	July 1, 1995
1997	Singapore	Joint Issue	Shells found in Thailand and Singapore: Drupa morum (Roding, 1798), Nerita chamaeleon (Linnaeus, 1758), Littoraria melanostoma (Gray, 1839), Cryptospira elegans (Gmelin, 1791)	October 9, 1997
2002	Australia	Joint Issue	Native Lotus and Water lilies: Nelumbo nucifera, Nymphaea immutabilis	August 6, 2002
2002	Sweden	Joint Issue	Royal palaces: Dusit Maha Prasat Throne Hall, Kungliga Slottet I Stockholm	October 5, 2002
2003	Canada	Joint Issue	National Tree: Ratchaphruek (Golden Shower), Maple	October 4, 2003
2003	South Africa	10 Years of Diplomatic Relations	Elephant: Asian elephant, African elephant	December 9, 2003
2004	Italy	Joint Issue	Historic buildings: Phu Khao Thong ("Golden Mountain") of Wat Saket in Bangkok, Colosseum in Rome	April 21, 2004
2005	Argentina	50th Anniversary of Diplomatic Relations	Dances: Tango, Klong Yao dance	February 2, 2005
2006	Iran	50th Anniversary of Diplomatic Relations	Wat Chai Watthanaram at Ayutthaya province and Apadana Palace at Persepolis	February 11, 2006
2006	Laos	Inauguration of the second Thai–Lao Friendship Bridge	The Second Thai–Lao Friendship Bridge over the Mekong connects Mukdahan Province in Thailand with Savannakhet in Laos.	December 20, 2006
2007	Brunei; Cambodia; Indonesia; Laos; Malaysia; Myanmar; Philippines; Singapore; Thailand; Vietnam	ASEAN 40th Anniversary	The architectural landmarks from 10 ASEAN countries: Secretariat Building, Bandar Seri Begawan, Brunei Darussalam; National Museum of Cambodia, Phnom Penh, Cambodia; Fatahillah Museum, Jakarta, Indonesia; Lao typical house, Laos; Malayan Railway Headquarters Building, Kuala Lumpur, Malaysia; General Post Office, Yangon, Myanmar; Malacanang Palace, Manila, Philippines; National Museum of Singapore, Singapore; Vimanmek Mansion, Bangkok, Thailand; Presidential Palace, Hanoi, Vietnam	August 8, 2007
2007	Japan	120th Anniversary of Diplomatic Relations	Designs of Thailand: The statue of demon at the Emerald Buddha Temple, Mother-of-pearl inlay work on the soles of the Reclining Buddha in Wat Pho, Orchid, Thai female dancer Designs of Japan: The Five-storied Pagoda in Nikko Toshogu Shrine, The dragon pattern on the Gagaku costume, A cherry blossom, Kabuki	September 26, 2007
2008	Turkey	50th Anniversary of Diplomatic Relations	The Loha Prasat (Iron Castle) of Wat Rajannadda of Thailand, and the Sultan Ahmed Mosque (Blue Mosque) of Turkey	May 12, 2008
2008	South Korea	50th Anniversary of Diplomatic Relations	Palaces: Chakri Maha Prasat Throne Hall, Grand Palace and Juhamnu Pavilion, Changdeokgung Palace	October 1, 2008
2011	Laos	60th Anniversary of Diplomatic Relations	Thai lady wearing her national costume, Ratchaphruek (Golden Shower); Lao lady wearing her national costume, Dok Champa	April 22, 2011
2011	Portugal	500th Anniversary of Diplomatic Relations	Two pairs of se-tenent designs illustrating the arrival of "NAU", the Portuguese ship to Ayutthaya and the historic scene of contact between Ayutthaya and Portugal 500 years ago	July 20, 2011
2011	Pakistan	60th Anniversary of Diplomatic Relations	The Victory Monument in Bangkok, Thailand and Minar-e-Pakistan in Lahore, Pakistan	December 13, 2011
2014	Laos	20th Anniversary of the First Thai-Lao Friendship Bridge	Songkran festival in Nong Khai Province and Boun That Luang festival in Vientiane, Wat Pho Chai in Nong Khai and Wat Ong Teu Mahawihan in Vientiane	April 5, 2014
2014	Israel	60th Anniversary of Diplomatic Relations	Mangosteen, Pomegranate	June 5, 2014
2014	Vatican City	Joint Issue	The oil-paint by Mr. Remi Mel describing the scene of appointing missionaries in 1659 and St. Joseph's Catholic Church in Ayutthaya	August 15, 2014
2014	Macau	Joint Issue	General Post Office buildings of Thailand and Macau	November 1, 2014
2015	North Korea	40th Anniversary of Diplomatic Relations	National bird: Siamese Fireback, Northern Goshawk	May 8, 2015
2015	Malaysia	Joint Issue	Marine Life: Harlequin shrimp, Coral guard crab, Nudibranch, White-spotted jellyfish	June 8, 2015
2015	Brunei; Cambodia; Indonesia; Laos; Malaysia; Myanmar; Philippines; Singapore; Thailand; Vietnam	ASEAN Community Commemorative Issue	ASEAN member states' flags are unified in a form of a flower, while a pigeon in the background symbolizes the region's pacific aspect, a handshake below the flags portrays friendship and the golden ears of rice refer to basic agriculture, the main ASEAN way of life	August 8, 2015
2015	Singapore	50th Anniversary of Diplomatic Relations	Mango Sticky Rice (Khao Niew Mamuang), Ice cream sandwich	September 18, 2015
2015	Sri Lanka	60th Anniversary of Diplomatic Relations	Phra Pathommachedi pagoda, Jethavana Stupa	November 2, 2015
2016	Indonesia	Joint Issue	Ramayana (called Ramakien in Thai) paintings: Mural painting from Temple of the Emerald Buddha, Balinese Kamasan Traditional painting	May 5, 2016
2016	Vietnam	40th Anniversary of Diplomatic Relations	Puppet shows: Mahajanaka Puppet show, King Le Loi and the Legend of Restored Sword Lake Water puppet show	August 5, 2016
2017	Russia	120th Anniversary of Diplomatic Relations	The royal photo of King Chulalongkorn and Emperor Nicholas II, taken during the royal visit to Russia in 1897	July 3, 2017
2018	Turkey	60th Anniversary of Diplomatic Relations	Martial Arts: Muay Thai, Turkish oil wrestling	May 12, 2018
2018	Romania	Joint Issue	Traditional folk costumes: Phuthai costume, Oltenia costume	May 31, 2018
2019	Philippines	70th Anniversary of Diplomatic Relations	Thai elephant, Filipino water buffalo (Carabao)	June 14, 2019
2019	Maldives	40th Anniversary of Diplomatic Relations with Maldives	Thai designs: Ang Thong Islands, Ratchaphruek (Golden Shower), Durian, Fishing boat Maldives designs: Atoll of Maldives, Rose, Coconut, Fishing boat	June 21, 2019

[top]

== Turkey ==
Year	Postal administration	Topic	Date of issue
2008	Indonesia		October 24, 2008
2010	Spain	The alliance of civilizations	October 18, 2010
2012	China	Bridges	November 26, 2012
2013	Romania	135th anniversary of diplomatic relations between Turkey-Romania	October 10, 2013
2013	Palestine		December 12, 2013
2014	Poland	600th anniversary of diplomatic relations between Turkey-Poland	November 28, 2014
2015	Iran		February 18, 2015

[top]

== United Nations ==
Year	Postal administration	Topic	Note
2008	Israel	International Holocaust Remembrance Day	

[top]

== United States ==
The United States Postal Service collaborates with the postal administration of another country to release a joint issue on a sporadic basis. With seven joint issues, Sweden is the most prolific philatelic partner of the United States.

Year	Postal administration	Topic	Note	Date of issue
1959	Canada	Opening of the St. Lawrence Seaway		
1960	Mexico	Sesquicentennial of Mexican Independence		
1960	Japan	Centennial of Treaty of Amity and Commerce		
1965	Spain	Quadricentennial of the Settlement of Florida		
1975	Soviet Union	Apollo-Soyuz Test Project	Two se-tenant stamps	
1976	Canada	United States Bicentennial		
1977	Canada	50th anniversary Peace Bridge	United States stamp design is a radically different design from the Canadian issue	
1980	Italy	250th birthday of Filippo Mazzei	Stamp designs are dissimilar	
1981	Ireland	Sesquicentennial of James Hoban's Death	US issued two denominations	
1982	Netherlands	Bicentennial of Diplomatic Recognition	The Netherlands issued two denominations	
1983	Sweden	Bicentennial of Treaty of Amity and Commerce		
1983	West Germany	Tricentennial of German Emigration		
1983	France	Bicentennial of Treaty of Paris	Stamp designs are dissimilar	
1984	Ireland	100th birthday of John McCormack		
1984	Canada	25th anniversary of the St. Lawrence Seaway	Stamp designs are dissimilar	
1986	Sweden	Stamp collecting	Booklet pane of four stamps	
1986	Italy	Sesquicentennial of Francis Vigo's death	Postal card	
1986	France	Centennial of the Statue of Liberty		
1987	Morocco	Bicentennial of Friendship		
1988	Australia	Bicentennial of Australia		
1988	Finland; Sweden	Settlement of New Sweden	Sweden issued booklet pane with additional stamps	
1989	France	Bicentennial of the French Revolution	Stamp designs dissimilar; France issued three stamps plus label	
1990	Federated States of Micronesia	Establishment of Free Association	Micronesia issued three stamps	
1990	Marshall Islands	Establishment of Free Association US		
1990	Soviet Union	Sea creatures	block of four	
1991	Switzerland	Septuacentennial of Switzerland		
1991	Soviet Union	10th anniversary of William Saroyan's Death US		
1992	Italy; Portugal; Spain	Quincentennial of Columbus' Voyages	Six souvenir sheets (five with three stamps, one with a single stamp)	
1992	Russia	Space Exploration	block of four	
1993	Monaco	Grace Kelly		
1994	China	Cranes	US: se-tenant pair; China: two single stamps	
1995	Palau	Marine life / First anniversary of Independence		
1996	Mexico	Endangered species	Stamp designs dissimilar: block of 15; Mexico: block of 25	
1996	Israel	Hanukkah	Hanukkah stamp	
1998	Mexico	Cinco de Mayo	US issued two values - Mexico issued one stamp; see Holiday stamp	
1999	Ireland	Sesquicentennial of Irish Emigration		
2001	Sweden	Centennial of the Nobel Prize		
2005	Sweden	100th birthday of Greta Garbo		
2006	United Kingdom	Animals in Children's literature	8 stamps issued by each country, 2 share the same character/design	
2006	Canada	Quadricentennial of Champlain's voyages	both countries' stamps also appear on a single souvenir sheet	
2007	Canada; Denmark; Finland; Greenland; Iceland; Norway; Sweden	International Polar Year 2007–2008	booklet of souvenir sheets	
2012	France	Miles Davis and Edith Piaf	Se-tenant pair; French issue is of two denominations	
2015	Japan	Gifts of Friendship	Stamp panes featuring U.S. designs (cherry blossoms and the Lincoln Memorial, and dogwood blossoms and the U.S. Capitol) and Japanese designs (the National Diet Building framed with cherry blossoms, and the clock tower outside the National Diet Building behind a foreground of white dogwoods). The U.S. pane shows the two U.S. designs at upper left and the two Japanese designs and at bottom left, with eight additional stamps (four of each of the U.S. designs) on the right. The Japanese pane shows the two Japanese designs at upper left and the two U.S. designs at bottom left, with six additional stamps on the right in three designs (two of each) depicting flowering tree blossoms.	
2015	Sweden	Ingrid Bergman	The U.S. stamp, at the "Forever" domestic rate, is part of the "Legends of Hollywood" series. The Sweden Post issue features two designs, both at the international letter rate.	
2017	Canada	The History of Hockey	Two stamp designs used by both countries. One stamp showing a player in a contemporary uniform and using modern equipment, and the other wearing vintage garb and using old-fashioned gear. The non-denominated (49¢) U.S. forever stamps issued in two different formats: in a pane of 20, and in a souvenir sheet of two stamps. Canada's non-denominated (85¢) permanent-rate stamps issued in a booklet of 10 self-adhesive stamps, and a perforated gummed souvenir sheet of two.	October 20, 2017

[top]

== Uruguay ==
Year	Postal administration	Topic	Note
2013	Israel	Jose Gurvich, "The Annunciation of Sarah"	

[top]

== Vatican City ==
Year	Postal administration	Topic	Note
1995	Germany; Ireland; Italy; San Marino	100th anniversary of Radio	
1997	Germany; Czech Republic; Hungary; Poland	St. Adalbert (956–997)	
1998	Italy; San Marino	Italia '98 (Stamp Expo)	John Paul II pictured
1998	Croatia	Christmas	
2000	Iceland	Christianity in Iceland, 1000th anniversary	
2000	Poland	Pope John Paul II, 80th birthday	
2002	New Zealand	Nativity	Painting by Ambrogio di Baldese
2003	Poland	Pontificate of John Paul II, 25th anniversary	Sheet of 25 plus silver foil self-adhesive
2005	Germany	20th World Youth Day	
2005	Italy	Ramification of Modifications to Concordat,	Set of 2
2005	France	Louvre and Vatican museums	Based on a painting and a sketch by Raphael
2005	Switzerland	Swiss Guard, 500th anniversary	Set of 2
2007	Singapore	Diplomatic relations, 25th anniversary	Set of 2
2007	Malta	Christmas	Set of 3
2008	Germany	Christmas	Set of 2
2008	Gibraltar	Gibraltar shrine to Our Lady of Europe, 700th anniversary	
2010	Israel	Pope's visit to Israel	Issued November 15, 2010
2011	Croatia	Rudjer Boskovich (1711–1787), Astronomer	also depicts Dome of St Peters Basilica
2012	Italy	Battle of the Milvian Bridge, 1700th anniversary	Souvenir sheet
2013	Italy	Edict of Milan 1700th anniversary	3 stamps plus souvenir sheet
2013	Bulgaria; Czech Republic; Slovakia	Mission of Sts. Cyril and Methodius to Slavic Lands 1150th anniversary	Souvenir sheet
2015	Israel	Church of the Holy Sepulchre, Jerusalem	Issued September 2, 2015
2020	Austria	Christmas	Issued November 20, 2020

[top]

slo

== See also ==
- Omnibus issue
