= Holiday stamp =

Postage stamps commemorating festivals or holidays

Holiday stamps are a type of postage stamp issued to commemorate a particular religious festival or holiday.

== Cinco de Mayo ==
=== United States and Mexico ===
In 1997 a joint issue was issued by Mexico, who issued one stamp, and the United States, who issued both a 32-cent and a 33-cent denomination. Cinco de Mayo celebrates the defeat of the French Army by Mexican soldiers at the Battle of Puebla though some people believe it is the Mexican day of independence.

== Easter ==
Ukraine is among the countries that have issued a stamp commemorating Easter, a Christian holiday.

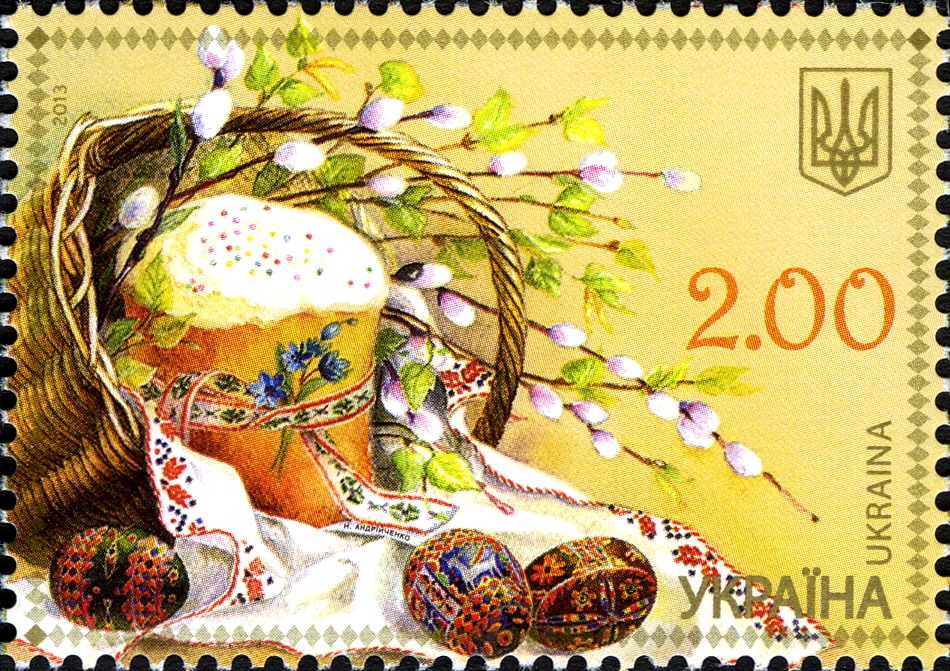
2013 Ukrainian Easter stamp

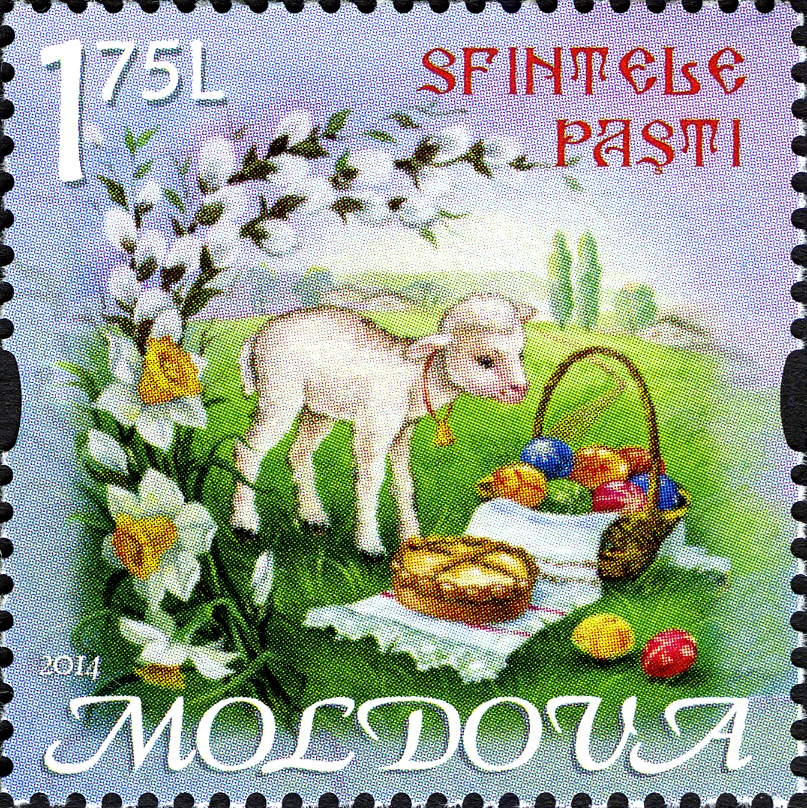
2014 Moldovan Easter Stamp

== Eid stamp ==
=== United States ===
The United States Postal Service issued a 34-cent stamp on the 1 September 2001 at the annual Islamic Society of North America's convention in Des Plaines, Illinois. It features gold Arabic calligraphy on a lapis background that commemorates two of the most important Muslim festivals: Eid ul-Fitr, marking the end of the month-long fast of Ramadan and Eid al-Adha, at the end of the pilgrimage to Mecca. During the festival, Muslims wish each other "Eid Mubarak," the phrase featured on the stamp. "Eid Mubarak" translates into English as "blessed festival," and can be paraphrased as "May your religious holiday be blessed." This phrase can be applied to both Eid al-Fitr and Eid al-Adha. This stamp was designed by the Islamic calligrapher Mohammed Zakariya.

On 12 August 2011, a new version of the Eid stamp, a "forever" stamp for first-class mail, was issued. With a red background, its calligraphy (i.e., text) is distinctly different from the 2001 stamp with a blue background. On the forever stamp, the text in the upper left corner is "2011 USA", and text in the upper right, running vertically, reads "FOREVER". Text running across bottom reads "EID GREETINGS".

Pakistan is among the other countries with an Eid stamp.

US Eid stamp 2001

== Hanukkah stamp ==
US Hanukkah stamp 1996

=== United States and Israel ===
The U.S. Postal Service issued a 32-cent stamp on October 22, 1996, as a joint issue with Israel. Hanukkah commemorates the revolt led by Judah Maccabee against the government of Antiochus IV in 165 BC. This initial printing produced 103.5 million stamps and in it was re-issued in 1999 in a 33-cent value.

The Israeli stamp employs the same multi-colored menorah design, by American Hannah Smotrich, a graduate of the Yale School of Art. Israel also issued a first-day cover as well as a souvenir sheet, which shows both stamps (pictured on left). As a unique feature, this was this first self-adhesive stamp in Israel.

In 2004, the U.S. issued another Hanukkah stamp depicting a photograph of a dreidel (a spinning toy with four sides), with the word 'Hanukkah' in the background. The dreidel shown was purchased in Jerusalem by an American couple. The stamp was first issued on October 15 in New York. The initial version of the stamp has been reissued; in 2006 it was 39 cents, in 2007, it was 41 cents stamp, and in 2008 it was a 42 cent stamp.

In 2013 United States Postal Service issued a new version of Hanukkah stamp which depicted menorah again. The stamp was issued on November 19 in New York.

== Independence Day stamps ==
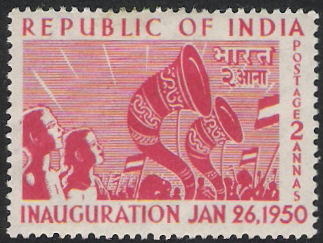
1950 Republic of India Inauguration

Many countries issue stamps to celebrate their Independence Day or Republic Day.

India celebrates its Independence on August 15, beginning with its first three stamps issued in 1947. Republic Day is celebrated on January 26, commencing with the four stamps issued in 1950.

Pakistan celebrates its Independence (Yaum e Azadi) on August 14, beginning with its first recess printed stamps.

== Kwanzaa stamp ==
First Kwanzaa stamp in 32 cent denomination

Kwanzaa is a non-religious African-American festival which synthesizes and reinvents traditional African "first fruits" celebrations. The U.S. Postal Service issued the first 32 cent stamp designed by self-taught artist Synthia Saint James for Kwanzaa on October 22, 1997. This design was revalued three times to 33-cent, 34-cent and 37-cent in 1999, 2001 and 2002, respectively. A total of 133 million Kwanzaa stamps were produced in 1997. A second Kwanzaa stamp, a 37-cent self-adhesive value, was introduced on October 16, 2004, with a new design by Daniel Minter that was intended to convey "balanced formality with a celebratory, festive mood." This stamp has been reissued; the 2006 was 39 cents, the 2007 value was 41 cents, the 2008 was 42 cents.

== Rosh Hashanah ==
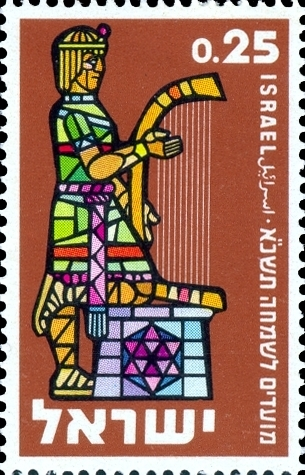
1960 Israeli festival stamp

Israel has issued its "festival" series of stamps every year to commemorate the Jewish New Year, Rosh Hashanah. In 1948, Israel's first festival stamps were designed by Otte Wallish and depicted LMLK seals stamped onto jars from the time of King Hezekiah (circa 700 BCE). The Rosh Hashanah stamps often display secular and patriotic motifs, such as bread, wine, olives, soldiers, kibbutzniks, Israeli dancing and the national library (1992). Fittingly, many series feature religious motifs, such as curtains for synagogue arks (1999), Hebrew Bible stories (1994), ushpizin of Sukkot (1997), Jewish lifecycle events (1995), and the orders the Mishnah (2006), with Nezikin pictured here.

== Saint Valentine's Day stamps ==
Several countries have issued love stamps for Saint Valentine's Day, such as; Belgium, France, Sweden, Norway and Denmark. Collectors will often try to collect covers from romantically named towns. Perhaps the most well known, servicing more than 200,000 each year around Valentine's Day, is Loveland, Colorado, US.

=== Ireland ===
In January 1985 and subsequent Januarys An Post, the Irish Post Office, started issuing love stamps for use on cards and letters for Saint Valentine's Day. The first pair of stamps issued depicted clouds and balloon (22p value) and hearts and flowers (26p value). An Post continues to issue new designs each year.

== Lunar New Year ==
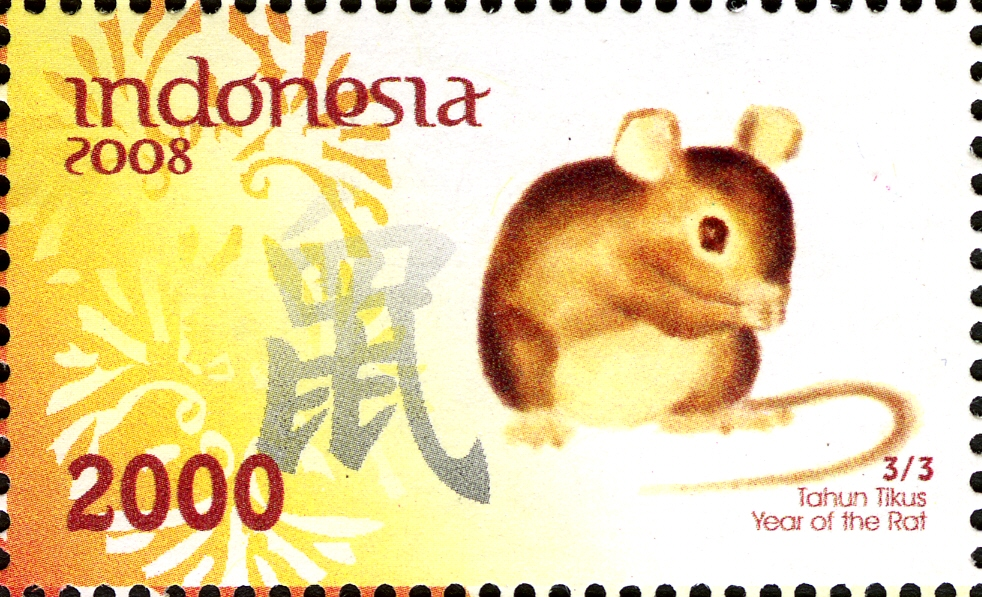
2008 Indonesian stamp

Several nations issue postage stamps to mark the Lunar New Year (or Chinese New Year). Typically appearing in January and February, issuing countries have included China, Taiwan, Hong Kong, Malaysia, Singapore, United States, New Zealand, Australia, Canada, and France.

The stamps usually depict the animal sign of that year, consisting of the sequence: Rat, Ox, Tiger, Rabbit, Dragon, Snake, Horse, Goat, Monkey, Rooster, Dog and Pig. The designs may be part of a set, or individually designed; for instance, since 1992 the US has been issuing Chinese New Year stamps using a common design type based on colored paper cutouts of the animals. In succeeding years, the U.S. Postal Service issued additional stamps until all twelve animals associated with the Chinese lunar calendar were represented. The calligraphic characters on these stamps may be translated into English as "Happy New Year".

Hong Kong was one of the first countries to issue a commemorative stamp for the lunar new year since the 1960s (1967), but other countries have followed:

- Republic of China (Taiwan) – since 1965
- People's Republic of China – since 1980
- Malaysia – Firstly started since 2000, Started again since 2010 until now
- Singapore – Zodiac series since 1996, Festival series on-off since 1971, biannually since 2000
- United States – since 1992
- Australia – since 1994
- Canada – since 1997
- Macau – since 1984
- France – since 2005
- Ireland – since 1994

Most of these stamps consist of first-day covers, commemorative sheets, and multiple country brochures.

== See also ==
- Commemorative stamp
- Stamp collecting
