= General Post Office, Yangon =

Building in Myanmar

General Post Office
- ရန်ကုန်စာတိုက်ကြီး
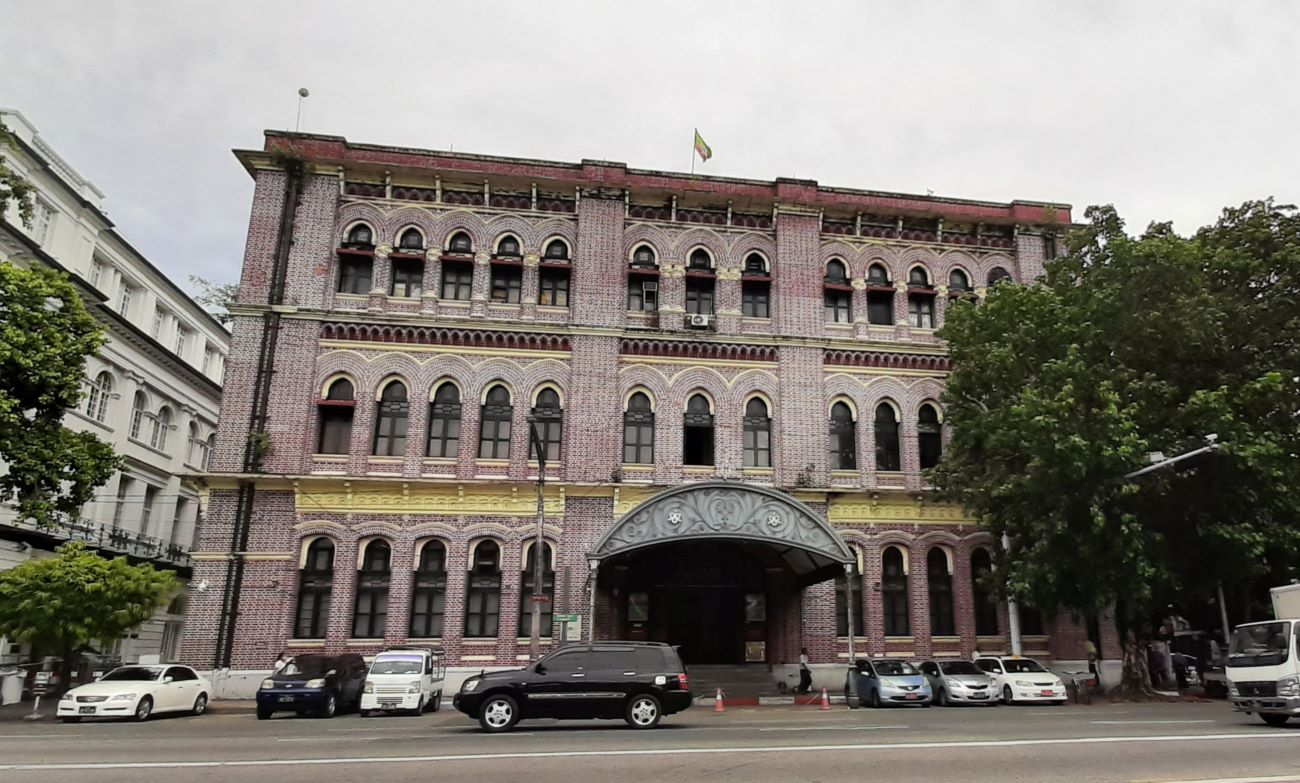

General information
- Location: Yangon, Myanmar
- Coordinates: 16.769458°N 96.163934°E
- Completed: 1908

General Post Office (Burmese: ရန်ကုန်စာတိုက်ကြီး) is a colonial-era landmark in Yangon, Myanmar (formerly Rangoon, Burma), designated in the Yangon City Heritage List. Located on the corner of Bo Aung Kyaw Street and Strand Road in Kyauktada Township, the building houses the central post office of Yangon.

General Post Office was built in 1908 by AC Martin & Company, and housed the headquarters of Bulloch Brothers & Company, a Scottish rice trading firm founded by James and George Bulloch. The company was liquidated in 1933, and the building was subsequently acquired and repurposed in 1936 by the colonial government as the general post office for Rangoon.

The building is noted for its lancet arched windows, its Beaux-Arts portico, ornate stucco work, and foyer.
