= Ziph =

Ziph or Zif may refer to:

- Ziph (Bible), a town of the Tribe of Judah, near Hebron
  - Wilderness of Ziph, a desert near the town of Ziph mentioned as the place where David hid himself from
- Another Judahite town named Ziph, south at the borders of the land of Edom
- One of five words inscribed on LMLK seals, possibly referring to the Judahite town of Ziph
- Zif, a Palestinian village close to Hebron, identified with the biblical Ziph
