= Moresheth-Gath =

Town of the Tribe of Judah in the Bible

Coordinates: 31.6334°N 34.9166°E

Moresheth-Gath (Hebrew: מוֹרֶשֶׁת גַּת), also Moreshet-Gat, was a town of the tribe of Judah in ancient Israel mentioned in the Bible. It was located in the Shephelah region between Lachish and Achzib.

== Etymology ==
The name Moresheth-Gath appears only once in the Hebrew Scriptures, inscribed in a verse taken from Micah 1:14. Biblical exegetes, Avraham ibn Ezra and David Kimhi, both explain the word as being "a place-name in the land of the Philistines," Kimhi adding that the name implies "the inheritance of Gath," namely, the city of Gath which was captured by David and which came into his inheritance (1 Chronicles 18:1); moresheth, in Hebrew, being derived from the Hebrew yerushah (ירושה= lit. "inheritance"). Jonathan ben Uzziel's Aramaic Targum, on the same verse, does not write Moreshet as a proper noun, but rather explains the word as a verb, meaning, "those who inherit Gath" (מחסיני גת), which is also the same approach taken by Rashi, in his commentary on the verse.

Others have argued that the name Moresheth-Gath means "possession of Gath", and that since Gath was the city of origin of Goliath, it has been speculated that Moresheth held a subservient relationship with the Philistine city. Wellhausen renders the passage in Micah "Thou must let go Moresheth, O Gath."

== History ==
Later scholars of biblical literature have understood Moresheth-Gath to be a place-name written in the construct state, meaning, "Maresha of Gath". Maresha is mentioned as the home town of the prophet Micah in the biblical Book of Micah and the Book of Jeremiah. The town was possibly also connected with Eliezer the prophet, and may have been one of Rehoboam's fortified towns When mentioned in the Bible, it is often in connection with Lachish, Keilah, Achzib and Mareshah.

It may also be the city Muchrashti, mentioned in the Amarna letters, and not coincidentally, as the town was located on an important route to Egypt and the south, explaining its fortification by Rehoboam.

Its strategic location led to its capture by Sennacherib in his attack on Judah in 701 BC. Centuries later, both Vespasian and Saladin camped nearby on the eve of sacking Jerusalem.

== Location ==
- Moresheth-Gath has been tentatively identified as Tell ej-Judeideh, about 2 kilometres (1.2 mi) north of Beit Guvrin and 9.7 kilometres southeast of Tell es-Safi, which was excavated in 1898–1900 by F. Bliss and R.A.S. Macalister.
- Jerome places Maresha a little to the East of Eleutheropolis (Beit Guvrin). The ruins of a village between one and two miles East of Beit Jibrin would fit his description, viz. Tel Sandahannah, and which has positively been identified as Maresha, based on a funerary inscription. Jerome says a church was built over Micah's tomb. Eusebius, gives similar location. Conversely, Tell ej-Judeideh lies to the north of Eleutheropolis.
- The Madaba Map shows a village called Morasthi to the north of Eleutheropolis, near a church of St. Micah. Scholars have noted that the source of the Madaba map is Eusebius' Onomasticon. The word "Morashti" is a noun showing that the person (in this case Micah) came from the village Maresha, but is erroneously used by Eusebius as a place-name in itself. The biblical verses referring to this name speak of "Micah the Morasthite," and where the Aramaic Targum in Micah 1:1 translates the sense as meaning, "Michah of Maresha."
- Some have believed Moresheth-Gath to have been in the vicinity of Mareshah. Although identification of Moresheth-Gath with Mareshah is discounted by Eusebius' time, there still remains some support for the site being none other than Maresha.
- Some scholars have identified Tell Khirbat al-Bayḍā approximately 6 km northeast of Maresha with Moresheth-Gath. While others suggest Tel-Goded to be Moresheth-Gath. Tel-Goded is today's Modern Hebrew name of the Tell formerly called Tell ej-Judeideh and lies exactly 9.7 kilometres southeast of Tell es-Safi.

== See also ==
- Book of Micah
- Maresha
- MMST
- LMLK
