= Zif, Hebron =

Zif
- Municipality type D (Village council)

Arabic transcription(s)
  - Arabic: زيف
- Location of Zif within the West Bank Location of Zif within Palestine
- Coordinates: 31°27′57″N 35°8′17″E
- Palestine grid: 163/098
- State: Palestine
- Governorate: Hebron

Government
  - Type: Village council

Population (2017)
  - Total: 1,061

Zif (Arabic: زيف) is a Palestinian village located 7 kilometers (4.3 mi) south of Hebron. The village is in the Hebron Governorate in the southern West Bank. According to the Palestinian Central Bureau of Statistics, Zif had a population of 1,061 in 2017.

== History ==
Tell Ziph near Zif has been identified as the site of ancient Ziph.

=== Iron Age ===
==== Hebrew Bible ====
Zif is identified with the biblical town of Ziph. It appears several times in the Hebrew Bible as a town in the vicinity of Hebron that belongs to Tribe of Judah (Joshua 15:20–55). The nearby "Wilderness of Ziph" is mentioned as a place where David hides himself from Saul (1 Samuel 26:1–2). Later, the town of Ziph is said to be fortified by Rehoboam (1 Kings 11:5–8). Its name was found on a number of royal Judahite LMLK seals along with those of Hebron, Socoh and MMST.

==== Archaeology ====
Iron Age remains were found at Tell Ziph, the nearby tell.

=== Roman and Byzantine periods ===
Zif existed as a village in the Roman period. Between the Great Jewish Revolt and the Bar Kokhba Revolt, it served as the administrative center for the district south of Hebron. Evidence of its Jewish population during this period is found in an inscription on an ossuary from Zif and two documents discovered in the Tze'elim Stream.

In the 4th century, Eusebius described it a place "of the tribe of Judah. It is now a kṓmē in the Daromas in the territory of Eleutheropolis, near Hebron, eight miles to the south. Where David hid". It had a Jewish population until at least the 4th century, but it became Christian during the Byzantine period.

The remains of a Byzantine-era Christian communal church have been discovered at Zif. Potsherds from the Byzantine period have also been found here.

=== Ottoman period ===
In 1838, Edward Robinson was the first to identify the village Zif and its adjacent Tell Zif with the biblical town of Ziph.

In 1863, Victor Guérin visited and described the ruins.

In 1874, surveyors from the PEF Survey of Palestine visited, and noted about Tell ez Zif: "A large mound, partly natural; on the north side a quarry; on the south are tombs. One of these has a single chamber, with a broad bench running round; on the back wall are three kokim with arched roofs, the arches pointed on the left side wall; at the back is another similar koka. A second tomb was a chamber, 8 feet to the back, 9 feet wide, with three recesses, one on each side, one at the back; they are merely shelves, 8 feet by 5 feet, raised some 2 feet. This tomb has a porch in front, supported by two square rock-cut piers."

=== 1967 and aftermath ===
In September 2002, a bomb filled with screws and nails, planted by Jewish settlers, exploded in the village's school, wounding five children. A second bomb was found by the school's principal and was detonated by Israeli bomb experts.

== Current status ==
Zif has been under Israeli occupation since 1967. The primary health care facilities in the village itself are designated by the Ministry of Health as level 1 and at nearby Yatta as level 3.

== Bibliography ==
- Conder, C.R.; Kitchener, H.H. (1883). The Survey of Western Palestine: Memoirs of the Topography, Orography, Hydrography, and Archaeology. Vol. 3. London: Committee of the Palestine Exploration Fund. (p. 315)
- Dauphin, C. (1998). La Palestine byzantine, Peuplement et Populations. BAR International Series 726 (in French). Vol. III : Catalogue. Oxford: Archeopress. ISBN 0-860549-05-4.
- Guérin, V. (1869). Description Géographique Historique et Archéologique de la Palestine (in French). Vol. 1: Judee, pt. 3. Paris: L'Imprimerie Nationale.
- Magness, J. (2003). The Archaeology of the Early Islamic Settlement in Palestine. Eisenbrauns. ISBN 978-1-4575-0070-1.
- Palmer, E.H. (1881). The Survey of Western Palestine: Arabic and English Name Lists Collected During the Survey by Lieutenants Conder and Kitchener, R. E. Transliterated and Explained by E.H. Palmer. Committee of the Palestine Exploration Fund. (p. 408)
- Robinson, E.; Smith, E. (1841). Biblical Researches in Palestine, Mount Sinai and Arabia Petraea: A Journal of Travels in the year 1838. Vol. 2. Boston: Crocker & Brewster.
- Tsafrir, Y.; Leah Di Segni; Judith Green (1994). (TIR): Tabula Imperii Romani: Judaea, Palaestina. Jerusalem: Israel Academy of Sciences and Humanities. ISBN 965-208-107-8.
