= MMST =

Word appearing on LMLK seals from the Kingdom of Judah

MMST (Hebrew: ממשת MMŠT) is a word written in Paleo-Hebrew abjad script. It appears exclusively on LMLK seal inscriptions, seen in archaeological findings from the ancient Kingdom of Judah, whose meaning has been the subject of continual controversy.

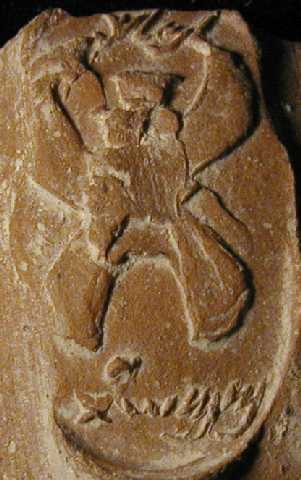
LMLK stamp; Redondo Beach collection #21

== Transliterations into the Latin alphabet ==
- Mamsatt (Ginsberg, 1948)
- Mamshat & variants
  - Mamshath (Conder, 1901)
  - Mamshat (Sellers and Albright, 1931)
  - Mamschat (Galling, 1937); reads in German like Mamshat in English
  - Mameshat (Yeivin, 1961)
- Mamshet (Aharoni, 1960)
- Mamshit & variants
  - Mamshith (Driver, 1909)
  - Mamshit (Vilnay, 1960)
- Memsath (McCown, 1947)
- Memshat & variants
  - Memshat (Bliss, 1900)
  - Memshath (Macalister, 1905)
- Mimshat (Macalister, 1925)

== Interpretations ==
=== As a place ===
Charles Warren excavated the first two specimens in the original 1868–1869 excavations at Jerusalem (Warren, 1870); however, those were both only partial impressions showing the final two letters ST. The first complete inscription was published by F. J. Bliss after excavating it in Tell Ej-Judeideh (Bliss, 1900), later determined to be biblical Moresheth-Gath. Here is a list of ancient sites that scholars have associated with the MMST labels:

- Moresheth-Gath (Clermont-Ganneau, 1899)
- Mampsis (also known as Kurnub; Hommel, 1901)
- Mareshah (Vincent, 1907)
- Tel Masos (see articles Tel Masos (fr) in French, and תל משוש (he) in Hebrew Wikipedia; also known as Tell el-Meshash or Khirbat al-Mishash; Abel, 1938)
- An unknown site near Gezer such as Emmaus (Albright, 1943)
- Jerusalem (via MMS[L]T) or one of its suburbs (Ginsberg, 1948)
- Tel 'Erani (Yeivin, 1961)
- Tel 'Ira (see French article Tel Ira in French Wikipedia; Yadin, 1961)
- An unknown site between Bethlehem & Hebron (Lang, 1972); Bethlehem vicinity preferred (Rainey, 1982)
- An unknown site between Beth Shemesh & Aijalon such as Emmaus (Lang, 1972)
- Emmaus (also known as Amwas; Lemaire, 1975)
- Ramat Rachel (Barkay, 1993)

These proposals fall into two main streams of thought. One school places MMST in a geographical region based on the identification of three other regions surrounding Hebron, Sokho, and Ziph (the other words on the LMLK seals). The chief problem is that the majority of the seal impressions were not found in any particular region associated with one of the four inscriptions. For example, the majority of HBRN stamps were found at Lachish significantly to the west. The other school of thought identifies MMST in the vicinity of Jerusalem (which includes Ramat Rachel), based upon the fact that the majority of MMST stamps were excavated in and around there. The chief problem is that there were more HBRN stamps than MMST found at Jerusalem and more Z(Y)F stamps than MMST found at Ramat Rachel (Grena, 2004, pp. 354–360).

In further support of a place name interpretation is the notion that MMST was lost from the Hebrew Masoretic version of the Book of Joshua, but preserved in a form corrupted beyond recognition through Greek transliteration in the Septuagint. The Septuagint version contains eleven additional place names, one of which could correspond to the lost MMST (Rainey, 1982, p. 59; cf. Joshua 15:59–60 in the New Revised Standard Version):

"...eleven cities, and their villages..."

- Theco
- Ephratha (Baethleem)
- Phagor
- Aetan
- Culon
- Tatam
- Thobes
- Carem
- Galem
- Thether
- Manocho

=== As a person ===
In 1905, R.A.S. Macalister suggested that MMST could also mean Mareshah, but instead of identifying it with the town, he proposed that the seal referred to a potter (or family of potters).

=== As a proclamation ===
If the LMLK seal inscriptions were votive slogans or mottoes instead of geographical places, MMST may share the same etymological root as MMSLTW (Strong's Concordance #4475), a Hebrew word used in the Bible translated alternately as domain, dominion, force, government, power, realm, responsibility, rule. (See Genesis 1:16, 1 Kings 9:1, 2 Chronicles 8:6, Psalms 103:22, 114:2, 136:8–9, 145:13, Isaiah 22:21, Jeremiah 34:1, 51:28, Daniel 11:5, Micah 4:8.) The parallel passage found in 2 Kings 20:13 and Isaiah 39:2 has garnered special attention for its association of the word in the same chronological context as the LMLK seals:

And Hezekiah was attentive to them, and showed them all the house of his treasures--the silver and gold, the spices and precious ointment, and all his armory--all that was found among his treasures. There was nothing in his house or in all his dominion that Hezekiah did not show them.

Likewise 2 Chronicles 32:9:

After this Sennacherib king of Assyria sent his servants to Jerusalem (but he and all the forces with him laid siege against Lachish), to Hezekiah king of Judah, and to all Judah who were in Jerusalem...

Note that Ginsberg suspected such a literal reading of the inscription in a paper presented in 1945, but changed to the geographic association with Jerusalem in 1948.

Note also the well-known Moabite inscription from Kerak that begins with the fragmented phrase ...MSYT MLK. While we may never know if the first word is a compound of KMS, the Moabite deity mentioned in the Bible as Chemosh, the MMST on the LMLK seals may have been "MMSYT" written scriptio defectiva with a possible relation to the Arabic "mumsa", "place where one spends the night".

=== As a tax ===
Recently, Daniel Vainstub pointed out that some of the MMST seals appear to include the Hebrew letter נ (nun) between the two letters מ (mem) or א (aleph) over the space between the ש (shin) and ת (tav). Vainstub suggested that the more common MMST (i.e., without additional letters) was a short-form of the Hebrew מ-משאת (from the mas'et), which was an ad-hoc tax of agricultural products occasionally used by the kings of Judah. At times, makers of the MMST seals preferred to use longer forms of the word. The appearance of the letter nun signifies the longer מן משאת, which has the same meaning as ממשאת (from mas'et) or ממשת (likewise).

== See also ==
- Archaeology of Israel

== Bibliography ==
- Abel, Pere [Félix-Marie] (1938). Geographie de la Palestine II. p. 377, footnote 17 (in French).
- Aharoni, Y. (1960). "Hebrew jar-stamps from Ramat Rahel". Eretz-Israel: Archaeological, Historical and Geographical Studies. 6: 28.
- Albright, William Foxwell (1943). "The excavation of Tell Beit Mirsim, Volume III: The Iron Age". Annual of the American Schools of Oriental Research. XXI–XXII: 73–75.
- Barkay, G. (personal communication quote by editor Ephraim Stern; 1993). Ramat Rahel in New Encyclopedia of Archaeological Excavations in the Holy Land. p. 1267.
- Bliss, F. J. (1900). "List of casts and wax impressions of stamped jar-handles". Palestine Exploration Quarterly. 32 (July): 298. doi:10.1179/peq.1900.32.3.298.
- Clermont-Ganneau, C. (1899). "Note on the inscribed jar-handle and weight found at Tell Zakariya". Palestine Exploration Quarterly. 31 (July): 204–207. doi:10.1179/peq.1899.31.3.204.
- Conder, C. R. (1901). "Jar-handle inscriptions II". Palestine Exploration Quarterly. 33 (January): 63.
- Galling, Kurt (see Kurt Galling in German Wikipedia; 1937). Biblisches Reallexikon. pp. 337–340 (in German).
- Ginsberg, Harold Louis (1948). "MMST and MSH". Bulletin of the American Schools of Oriental Research. 109 (109). The American Schools of Oriental Research: 20–21. doi:10.2307/1355843. JSTOR 1355843. S2CID 163246887.
- Grena, G.M. (2004). LMLK--A Mystery Belonging to the King vol. 1. Redondo Beach, California: 4000 Years of Writing History. ISBN 0-9748786-0-X.
- Hommel, Fritz (1901). "MMST--Mampsis". The Expository Times. 12 (September): 288.
- Lang, Bernhard (1972). "Recension: "Die Königs-Stempel" by Peter Welten". Revue Biblique (in German). 79 (3 (July 1972)): 441–444.
- Lemaire, André (1975). "MMST = Amwas, vers la solution d'une enigme de l'epigraphie Hebraique". Revue Biblique (in French). 82 (1): 15–23.
- Macalister, R. A. Stewart (1905). "The craftsmen's guild of the tribe of Judah". Palestine Exploration Quarterly. 37 (January): 243–253. doi:10.1179/peq.1905.37.3.243.
- Macalister, R. A. S. (1925). A Century of Excavation in Palestine. pp. 37–38, 190–1.
- McCown, Chester Charlton (1947). Tell en-Nasbeh I: Archaeological and Historical Results. pp. 156–161.
- Rainey, Anson F. (1982). "Wine from the royal vineyards". Bulletin of the American Schools of Oriental Research. 245 (Winter). The American Schools of Oriental Research: 57–62. doi:10.2307/1356528. JSTOR 1356528. S2CID 164003915.
- Rolles, S. R. (1909). Modern Research as Illustrating the Bible. Oxford University Press. pp. 74–77.
- Sellers, Ovid R. & Albright, W. F. (1931). "The first campaign of excavation at Beth-zur". Bulletin of the American Schools of Oriental Research. 43 (43): 8. doi:10.2307/1354782. JSTOR 1354782. S2CID 163731900.
- Vilnay, Zev (1960). Gath (Kiryat-Gat) (1960 and possibly earlier, to 1942 ed.).
- Vincent, Louis-Hugues (1907). Canaan d'après l'exploration récente (in French). Paris: libr. V. Lecoffre (Gabalda et Cie). pp. 357–360.
- Warren, Charles (1870). "Phoenician inscription on jar handles". Palestine Exploration Quarterly. 2 (September 30): 372.
- Yadin, Yigael (1961). "The fourfold division of Judah". Bulletin of the American Schools of Oriental Research. 163 (163). The American Schools of Oriental Research: 6–12. doi:10.2307/1355766. JSTOR 1355766. S2CID 163378419.
- Yeivin, Shemuel (1961). First Preliminary Report on the Excavations at Tel Gat (Tell Sheykh 'Ahmed el-Areyny) 1956–1958. Jerusalem: The Gat Expedition. pp. 9–11.
