= Micah (prophet) =

Prophet in Judaism and Christianity

Prophet Micah מִיכָה Μιχαίας
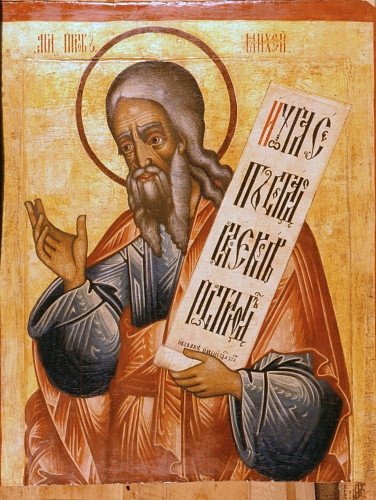
- The prophet Micah, as depicted by an 18th-century Russian Orthodox icon from the iconostasis of a church on Kizhi Island in Karelia, Russia.

Prophet
- Born: Moresheth-Gath, 8th century BC
- Venerated in: Second Temple Judaism (historically); Rabbinic Judaism; Eastern Orthodox Church; Catholic Church; Oriental Orthodox Churches; Assyrian Church of the East; Ancient Church of the East
- Feast: August 14, January 5 (Eastern Orthodox); July 31, December 31 (Roman Catholic); July 31 (Armenian Apostolic Church); August 16 (Mesori 10) (Coptic Orthodox); August 16 (Nähase 10) (Ethiopian Orthodox, Eritrean Orthodox)
- Major works: Book of Micah

According to the Hebrew Bible, Micah (Hebrew: מִיכָה הַמֹּרַשְׁתִּי, Mīḵā hamMōraštī—"Micah the Morashtite”; Paleo-Hebrew: 𐤌𐤉𐤊𐤄, Mīkhāh; Koine Greek: Μιχαίας, Michaías; Biblical Aramaic: מִיכָא, Mîḵā’; Church Slavonic: Михе́й, Mikhéy; Latin: Michaeas, Micheas) was a prophet of Yahweh and is traditionally regarded as the author of the Book of Micah. He is considered one of the Twelve Minor Prophets of the Hebrew Bible and is depicted as a contemporary of the prophets Isaiah, Amos and Hosea. Micah is described as having been from Moresheth-Gath, in southwest Judah and prophesying during the reigns of kings Jotham, Ahaz, and Hezekiah of the southern Kingdom of Judah in the 8th century BC.

Micah's messages were directed chiefly toward Jerusalem. He prophesied the future destruction of Jerusalem and Samaria by the Neo-Assyrian Empire, the destruction and then future restoration of the Judean state, and he rebuked the people of Judah for dishonesty and idolatry.

The formation of the Book of Micah is debated, with a consensus that its final stage occurred during the Persian period or Hellenistic period, but uncertainty remains about whether it was formed at the time or merely finalized.

Micah 5:2 is interpreted by Christians as a prophecy that Bethlehem, a small village just south of Jerusalem, would be the birthplace of the Messiah.

== Biblical narrative ==
Micah was active in the Kingdom of Judah from before the fall of Israel in 722 BC and experienced the devastation brought by Sennacherib's invasion of Judah in 701 BC. He prophesied from approximately 740 to 698 BC. Micah was from Moresheth, also called Moresheth-Gath, a small town in southwest Judah. Micah lived in a rural area, and often rebuked the corruption of city life in Israel and Judah. Unlike prophets such as Isaiah and Hosea, no record of his father's name has been retained by the scribes, but it is likely that he was descended from the common people, as the target of his message was towards the privileged classes. John Taylor comments that "To call a man a rural prophet is not to say that he was ignorant."

Micah prophesied during the reigns of kings Jotham, Ahaz, and Hezekiah of Judah. Jotham, the son of Uzziah, was king of Judah from 742 to 735 BC, and was succeeded by his own son Ahaz, who reigned over Judah from 735 to 715 BC. Ahaz's son Hezekiah ruled from 715 to 696 BC. Micah was a contemporary of the prophets Isaiah, Amos, and Hosea. Jeremiah, who prophesied about thirty years after Micah, recognized Micah as a prophet from Moresheth who prophesied during the reign of Hezekiah, quoting text found in Micah 3:12.

The Hebrew name Micah (מִיכָה, Mīḵā) is a theophoric name, meaning “Who is like Yah(weh)?” The meaning is a rhetorical question following an interrogative structure, implying that no one is like God. This name has the same etymological origin as the name Micaiah (מִיכָיָהוּ, Mīḵāyāhū), which another prophet—Micaiah, Son of Imlah—bears in the books of 1 Kingdoms (1 Kings) and 2 Chronicles. This name also shares a similar etymology to that of the name Michael (מִיכָאֵל, Mīkhā’ēl), which means “Who is like El?” In the name Michael (the name of a prominent archangel, the Archangel Michael), the Hebrew word “El,” a generic term meaning “God,” is used, while the names Micah and Micaiah utilize the Divine Name.

== Message ==
Micah’s messages were directed mainly towards Jerusalem, and were a mixture of denunciations and prophecies. In his early prophecies, he predicted the destruction of both Samaria and Jerusalem for their respective sins. The people of Samaria were rebuked for worshipping idols, which were bought with the income earned by prostitutes. Micah was the first prophet to predict the downfall of Jerusalem. According to him, the city was doomed because its beautification was financed by dishonest business practices, which impoverished the city's citizens. He also called to account the prophets of his day, whom he accused of accepting money for their oracles.

Micah also anticipated the destruction of the Judean state and promised its restoration more glorious than before. He prophesied an era of universal peace over which the Governor will rule from Jerusalem. Micah also declared that when the glory of Zion and Jacob is restored, the LORD will force the Gentiles to abandon idolatry.

Micah also rebuked Israel because of dishonesty in the marketplace and corruption in government. He warned the people, on behalf of God, of pending destruction if ways and hearts were not changed. He told them what the LORD requires of them:

He hath shewed thee, O man, what is good; and what doth the LORD require of thee, but to do justly, and to love mercy, and to walk humbly with thy God?

— Micah 6:8

Israel's response to Micah's charges and threats consisted of three parts: an admission of guilt, a warning of adversaries that Israel will rely on the LORD for deliverance and forgiveness, and a prayer for forgiveness and deliverance.

Another prophecy given by Micah details the future destruction of Jerusalem and the plowing of Zion (a part of Jerusalem). This passage (Micah 3:11–12), is stated again in Jeremiah 26:18, Micah's only prophecy repeated in the Old Testament. Since then Jerusalem has been destroyed three times, the first one being the fulfillment of Micah's prophecy. The Babylonians destroyed Jerusalem in 586 BC, about 150 years after Micah gave this prophecy.

== Christian interpretation ==
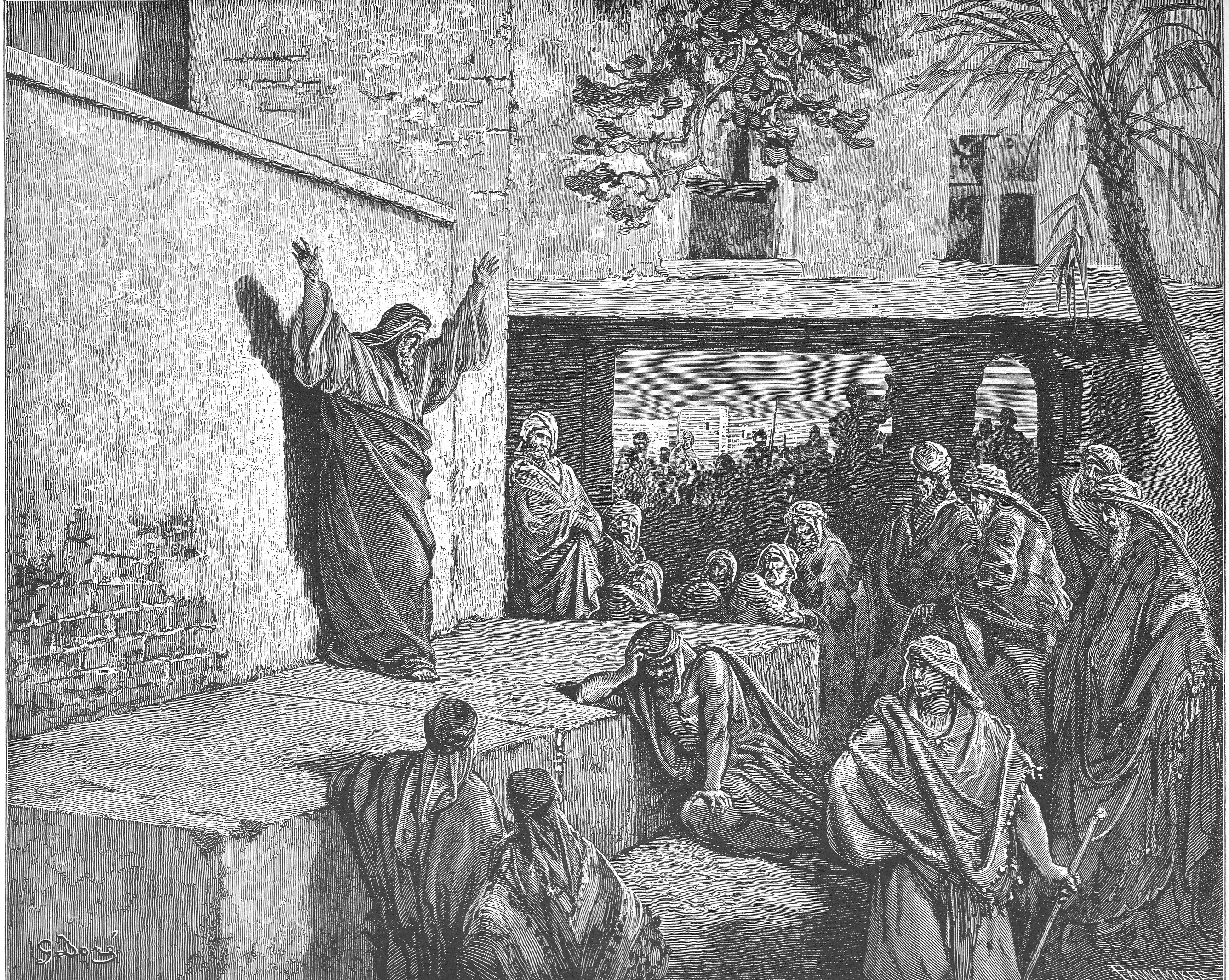
Engraving of the Prophet Micah by Gustave Doré.

Micah 5:2 is interpreted as a prophecy that Bethlehem, a small village just south of Jerusalem, would be the birthplace of the Messiah. Christians also interpret the latter portion of the verse to be an indication of the divinity and eternality of the Messiah.

But thou, Bethlehem Ephratah, though thou be little among the thousands of Judah, yet out of thee shall he come forth unto me that is to be ruler in Israel; whose goings forth have been from of old, from everlasting.

This passage is recalled in Matthew 2:6, and the fulfillment of this prophecy in the birth of Jesus is further described in Matthew 2:1–6.

And thou Bethlehem, in the land of Juda, art not the least among the princes of Juda: for out of thee shall come a Governor, that shall rule my people Israel.

In Matthew 10:35–36 Jesus adapts Micah 7:6 to his own situation;

For I am come to set a man at variance against his father, and the daughter against her mother, and the daughter in law against her mother in law. And a man's foes shall be they of his own household.

Micah was referring to the division in Judah and Samaria, the distrust that had arisen between all citizens, even within families. Jesus was using the same words to describe something different. Jesus said that he did not come to bring peace, but to divide households. Men are commanded to love Jesus Christ more than their own family members, and Jesus indicated that this priority would lead to persecution from others and separation within families.

In Micah 7:20, Micah reminded Judah of God's covenant to be merciful to Jacob and show love to Abraham and his descendants. This is repeated in Luke 1:72–73 in the prophecy Zechariah at the circumcision and naming of John the Baptist. This prophecy concerned the kingdom and salvation through the Messiah. It is a step in the fulfillment of the blessing of the descendants of Abraham. When Micah restated this covenant promise, he was comforting Judah with the promise of God's faithfulness and love.

Micah's prophecy to King Hezekiah is mentioned in Jeremiah 26:17–19:

Then certain of the elders of the land rose up and spoke to all the assembly of the people, saying: “Micah of Moresheth prophesied in the days of Hezekiah king of Judah, and spoke to all the people of Judah, saying, ‘Thus says the Lord of hosts:

“Zion shall be plowed like a field,

Jerusalem shall become heaps of ruins,

And the mountain of the temple

Like the bare hills of the forest.” ’

— Jeremiah 26:17–19, NKJV

== Liturgical commemoration and historical reception ==
The prophet Micah is commemorated and venerated as a saint by multiple Christian churches that historically claim Apostolic succession and follow a liturgical calendar.

Eastern Christianity

In the Oriental Orthodox communion, Micah is commemorated with the other eleven minor prophets in the Calendar of Saints of the Armenian Apostolic Church on July 31. He is commemorated by the Coptic Orthodox Church, Ethiopian Orthodox Tewahedo Church, and Eritrean Orthodox Tewahedo Church on August 16 (Coptic calendar: Mesori 10; Ethiopian calendar: Nähase 10).

In the Eastern Orthodox Church he is commemorated on August 14 (the forefeast of the Great Feast of the Dormition of the Mother of God) and on January 5 alongside the other Minor Prophets during the Feast of the Synaxis of the Holy Seventy Apostles. According to the tradition of the Church, Micah’s holy relics were discovered by a monk near Eleutheropolis (modern-day Beit Guvrin) during the reign of Roman emperor Theodosius the Great in the 4th century AD. The Orthodox Synaxarion commemorates the translation (uncovering) of his relics on his feast day, August 14. In Byzantine iconography, Micah is often depicted holding a scroll that features either Micah 5:2 or Micah 6:8 while wearing a tunic and himation.

Troparion of the prophet Micah — Tone 2:

We celebrate the memory of Your prophet Micah, O Lord; through him, we entreat You: save our souls.

Kontakion to the prophet Micah — Tone 4:

Enlightened by the Spirit, your pure heart became the dwelling place of most splendid prophecy; / for you saw things far off as if they were near. / Therefore, we honor you, blessed and glorious Prophet Micah.

The biblical prophet Micah is recognized in Christian tradition for foretelling the incarnation of Christ, leaving behind writings that remain central to prophetic scripture.

Micah and his writings were also referenced by notable eastern Church Fathers, such as St. John Chrysostom and St. Cyril of Jerusalem.

St. John Chrysostom, quoting Micah 6:8 in Homily 19 on Matthew (pg. 57:63):

“Even before the coming of Christ, the prophets taught this: ‘What does the Lord require of you but to do justice, to love mercy, and to walk humbly with your God?’ You see how nothing burdensome is imposed, nothing difficult, nothing involving the offering of sacrifices or burnt offerings.”

Micah, along with the other Minor Prophets, does not have a specific feast day on the liturgical calendar of the Assyrian Church of the East or the Ancient Church of the East—two branches of the historical Church of the East—however, he has been historically revered and the Book of Micah is read during the Nativity liturgy.

Theodore of Mopsuestia, a prominent theologian of the Antiochene school in the late fourth and early fifth centuries, composed a commentary on the Book of Micah as part of his larger exegetical work on the Twelve Prophets. Though the original Greek text is largely lost, his interpretation survives in part through Syriac translations, particularly in the preserved in Eastern Christian traditions. Theodore approached Micah with a historical-literal method, emphasizing the prophet’s immediate context and downplaying allegorical interpretations. His exegesis influenced later theologians in the East, especially within the Church of the East, where his works were held in high esteem and often transmitted in the biblical commentaries of later figures such as Isho’dad of Merv.

Western Christianity

He is commemorated by the Roman Catholic Church on July 31 alongside other prophets of the Old Testament, as well as on December 31.

Micah and his writings were often referenced by early Latin Church Fathers, such as St. Jerome, who wrote:

“…Micah…which is translated humility. On Micah of Moresheth…Moresheth…means heir. Beautifully, thus, humility…is born in the hope of the Lord’s inheritance.”

Rabbinic Judaism

Unlike in Christianity, Judaism does not have a fixed liturgical day of commemoration for Micah or the other Minor Prophets. However, the Book of Micah is often read during the Jewish liturgical cycle as Haftarot, along with other books of the Nevi’im.

He is referenced several times in the Talmud, where he and the other prophets are discussed along with their writings. Micah is praised in Makkot 24a (Talmud Bavli) for distilling the essence of the Torah into three principles: justice (mishpat), loving-kindness (chesed), and humilty before God (hatznea lekhet).

Makkot 24a:

“Micah came and established [the Torah] upon three [principles], as it is stated: ‘It has been told you, O man, what is good, and what the Lord requires of you: only to do justice, to love mercy, and to walk humbly with your God.’ (Micah 6:8)”

== Bibliography ==
- Delbert R. Hillers, Micah (Minneapolis, Fortress Press, 1984) (Nurse).
- Bruce K. Waltke, A Commentary on Micah (Grand Rapids, Eerdmans, 2007).
- Mignon Jacobs, Conceptual Coherence of the Book of Micah (Sheffield, Sheffield Academic Press, 2009).
- Yair Hoffman Engel, "The Wandering Lament: Micah 1:10–16," in Mordechai Cogan and Dan`el Kahn (eds), Treasures on Camels' Humps: Historical and Literary Studies from the Ancient Near East Presented to Israel Eph`al (Jerusalem, Magnes Press, 2008).
