= Maresha =

Archaeological site in southern Israel

Caves of Maresha
UNESCO World Heritage Site
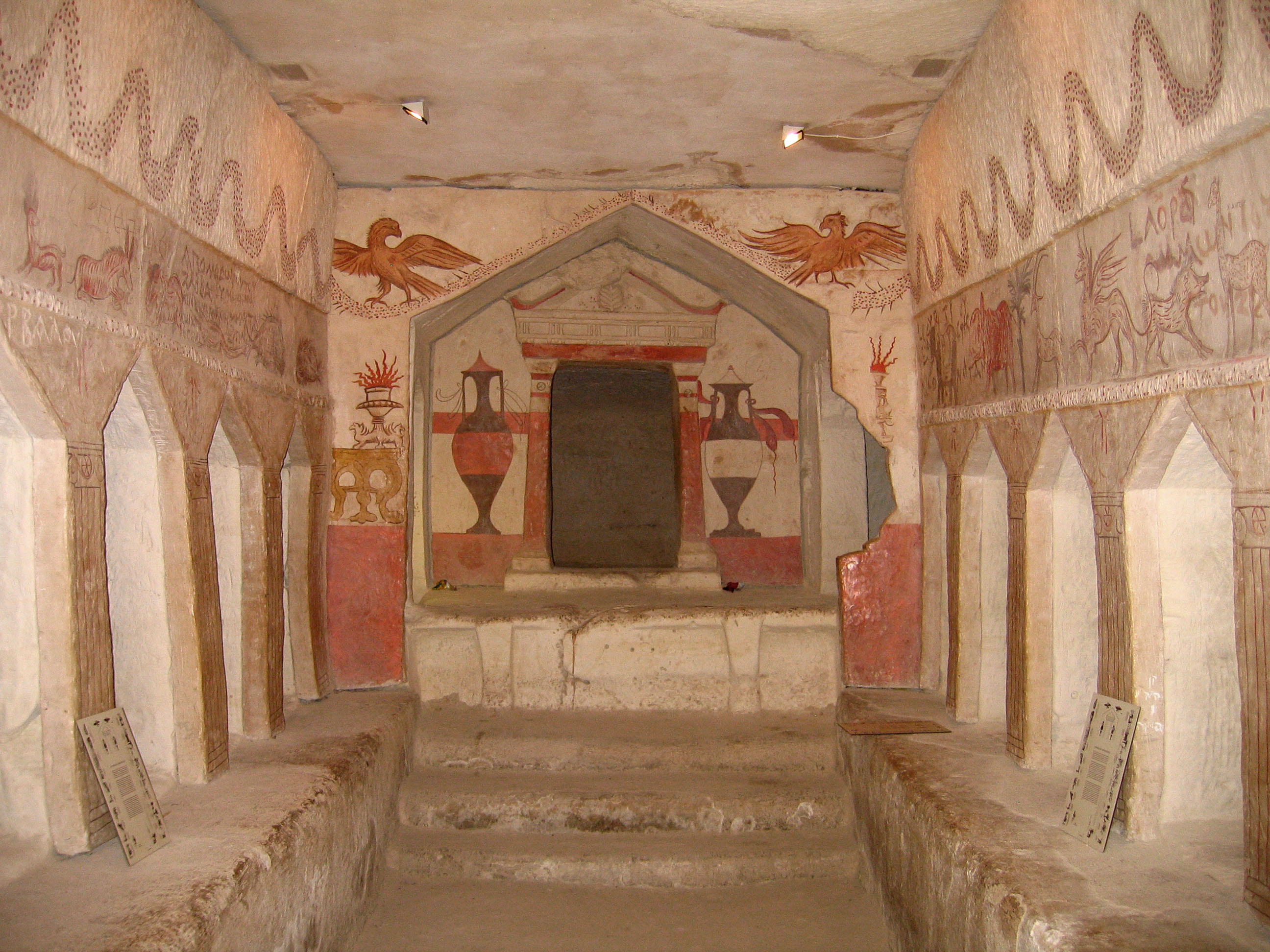
- The Apollophanes Cave (Sidonian Tomb) at Maresha's eastern necropolis

- Location within Israel
- Location: Shfela, Israel,
- Part of: Caves of Maresha and Bet-Guvrin in the Judean Lowlands as a Microcosm of the Land of the Caves
- Criteria: Cultural: (v)
- Reference: 1370
- Inscription: 2014 (38th Session)
- Coordinates: 31°35′35″N 34°53′54″E

Maresha was an Iron Age city mentioned in the Hebrew Bible, whose remains have been excavated at Tell Sandahanna (Arabic name), an archaeological mound or 'tell' renamed after its identification to Tel Maresha (Hebrew: תל מראשה). The ancient Judahite city became Idumaean after the fall of Judah in 586 BCE, and after Alexander's conquest of the region in 332 BCE became Hellenised under the name or Marissa (Greek: Μαρίσσα) . The tell is situated in Israel's Shephelah region, i.e. in the foothills of the Judaean Mountains, about 1.5 kilometres (0.93 mi) south of Beit Gubrin.

Excavations revealed that Maresha was inhabited (not necessarily continuously) during the Iron Age, the Persian period, and the Hellenistic period. The Hasmonean ruler John Hyrcanus captured the city in 113/112 BCE, ending its status as a major Hellenistic center. Maresha remained sparsely populated until its ultimate destruction by the Parthians in 40 BCE, after which it was abandoned.

Maresha was first excavated in 1898–1900 by the British archaeologists Bliss and Macalister on behalf of the Palestine Exploration Fund and again after 1989 by Israeli archaeologist Amos Kloner on behalf of the Israel Antiquities Authority. Most of the artifacts of the British excavation are to be found today in the Istanbul Archaeology Museums.

This site is now protected as part of Beit Guvrin-Maresha National Park and its burial caves are recognized by UNESCO as a World Heritage Site.

== Identification ==
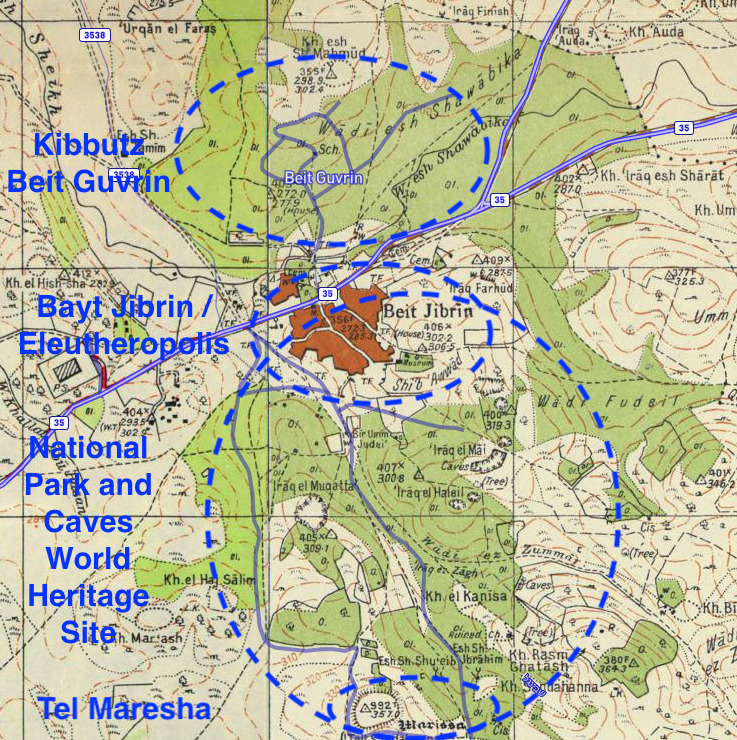
Map illustrating the locations of Kibbutz Beit Guvrin, historical Bayt Jibrin-Eleutheropolis, the ancient caves World Heritage Site, and Tel Maresha (1940s Survey of Palestine map with modern overlay)

The location of Maresha in relation to Eleutheropolis (Beit Gubrin) has been noted by Eusebius in his Onomasticon, who wrote:

Maresa (Joshua 15:44). Tribe of Judah. It is now a deserted site about 2 milestones from Eleutheropolis.

C.R. Conder and H.H. Kitchener of the Palestine Exploration Fund surmised that Maresha should be identified with Khurbet Mar'ash, a ruin 3/4 mile south of Beit Jibrin, based on a phonetic similarity of their names. It was not until J. P. Peters and Hermann Thiersch explored the ruins of Khurbet Sandahannah (grid position 140111 PAL) in 1902 that they discovered a Greek funerary inscription in an adjacent burial cave (known as the Sidonian burial Cave) which explicitly identified the site as Maresha. Today, Khurbet Sandahannah is an archaeological tell comprising 24 dunams (5.9 acres), with its "lower city" incorporating into it an additional 400 dunams (98 acres).

== History ==
=== Iron Age ===
Maresha was one of the cities of Judah during the time of the First Temple and is mentioned as part of the inheritance of the biblical tribe of Judah in the Book of Joshua.

==== Kingdom of Judah ====
Later, in the second Book of Chronicles, it is named as one of King Rehoboam's fifteen fortified cities. In 2 Chronicles it is the site of a battle against an invading Ethiopian army.

According to the Madaba Map, Maresha was the place "whence came Micah the Prophet". In the 6th century BCE, as result of Zedekiah's rebellion against the Babylonian kingdom and its king Nebuchadnezzar II, the latter occupied the Judean kingdom and sent many of its inhabitants into exile. This marked the end of Maresha as a Judahite city.

=== Edomite period ===
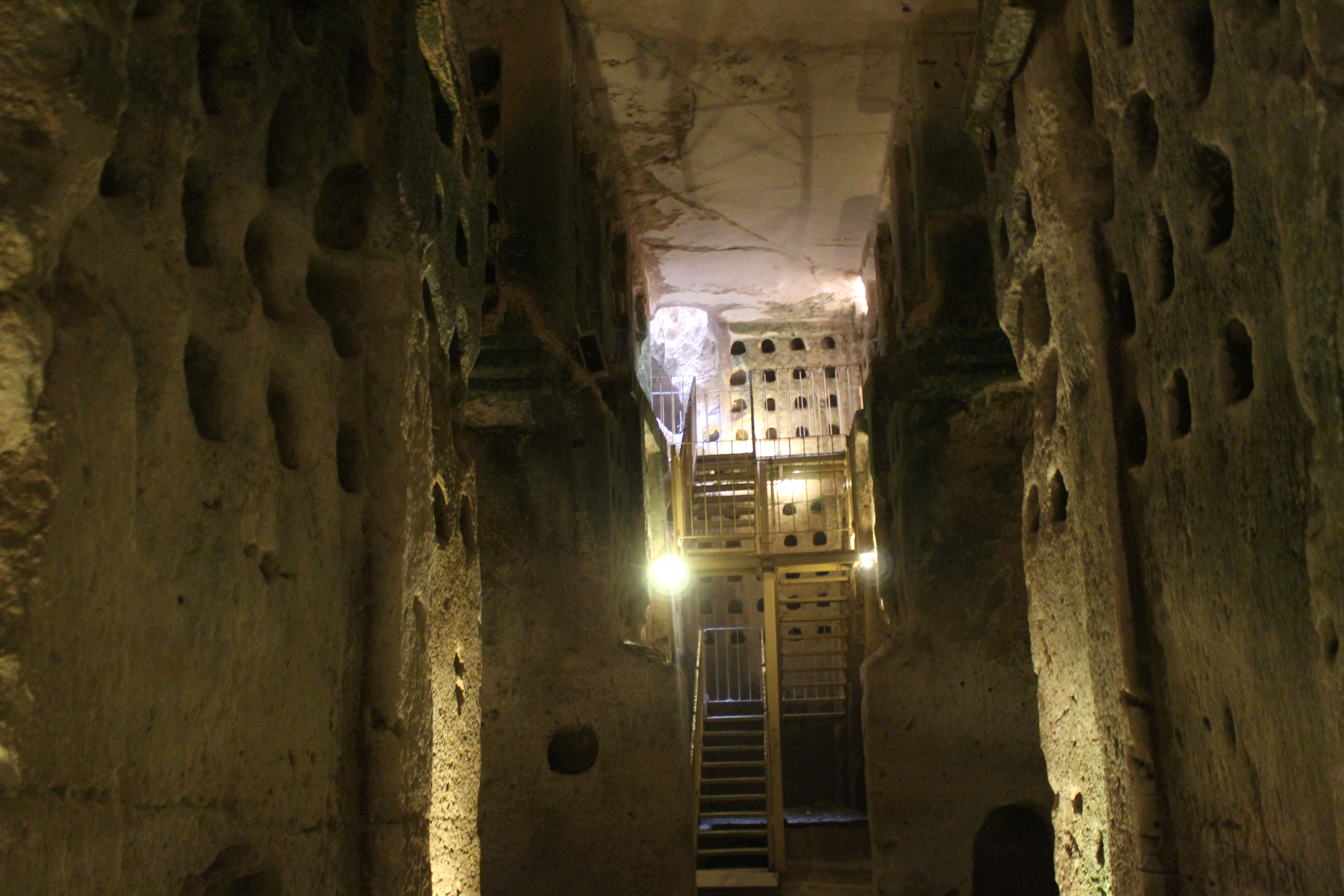
The columbarium at Tell Maresha

Following these events, Edomites who had lived east and south of the Dead Sea migrated to the area and Maresha emerged as a major Idumean city. Hence, from the Persian rule and throughout the Hellenistic kingdoms' rule in the region (6th – 1st century BCE), Maresha was part of the area known as Idumea, a Hellenised form of Edom. During the period of Persian rule, Phoenician colonies were encouraged to spread out along the coastal regions of Palestine and in the adjacent hill country of Judea, whence their early settlement in Maresha took its rise.

=== Hellenistic period ===
With the conquest of the region by Alexander the Great, retired Greek soldiers settled among the inhabitants as was then custom. Maresha reached its zenith, developing as a bilingual (Greek and Aramaic) Hellenistic city encompassing a blend of cultures including Greek, Sidonians and Nabataeans, with a main Idumean identity. With the advent of Hellenisation, the settlement pattern changed, as most everywhere in the region, and the city expanded far beyond the constraints of the fortified, raised tell or mound of Iron Age Maresha. Maresha became the center of an administrative district in the Ptolemaic empire, while from 200 BCE onward the center of a Seleucid administrative district.

=== Decline and fall ===
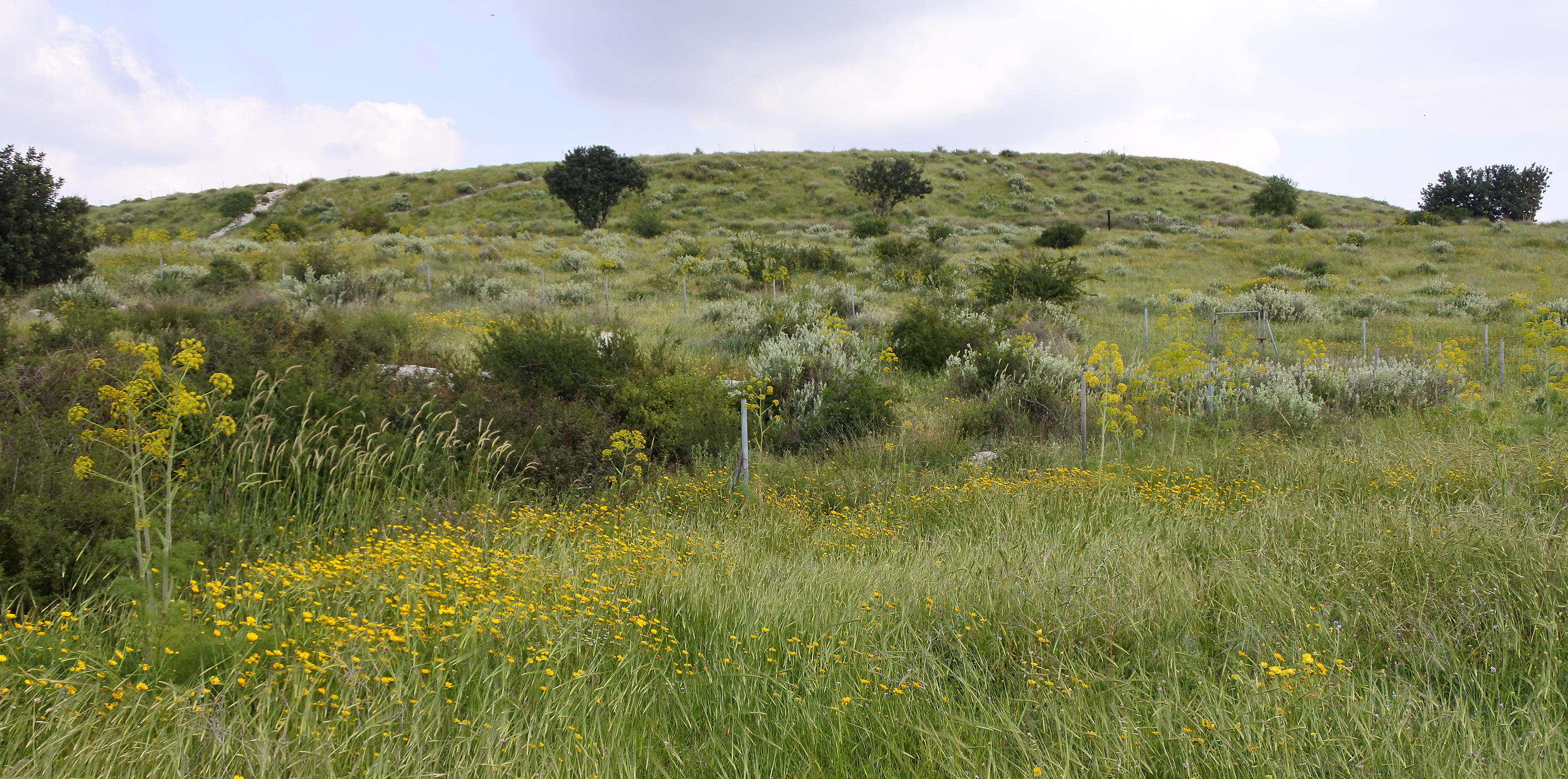
Tel Maresha

The city began its decline during the Maccabean Revolt against the Seleucid Empire (2nd century BCE) when the city was used as base to combat the rebels. The Book of Maccabees reports that Judas Maccabeus and his forces marched through Marisa in around 163/2 BCE when the city was burnt during Judas' conquest of the Idumaean region, from Hebron to Azotus (Ashdod).

Following the rebellion and its success, John Hyrcanus conquered the city in c. 112 BCE, forcibly converting its inhabitants to Judaism, Hyrcanus' conquest ended the life of the city of Maresha. He apparently forbade its inhabitants from living in the upper city, where a garrison was stationed. Very meager artifactual remains are evident from the late 2nd century BCE up to 40 BCE, found in only one corner of the upper city, and almost none in the large lower city surrounding it, which once covered an area of 320 dunams.

If indeed neither the upper nor the lower city were reinhabited at least in part, the one remaining possibility mentioned by Amos Cloner is that the name of Maresha was transferred to the nearby hill of Bet Guvrin, which could have been used as the main settlement of the district for several decades, from the end of the second century BCE until its destruction by the Parthians. A first-century BCE coin, presumed to have been minted by the citizens of Maresha, was discovered during excavations at Bet Guvrin, which can be interpreted as an argument in favour of this suggestion.

In 63 BCE, as part of the arrangements made by Pompey in the region, Maresha, along with all of Edom, was separated from the Jewish kingdom and returned to Idumea. In 47 BCE Julius Caesar then annexed the city to Judea.

Maresha was finally destroyed in 40 BCE by the Parthians as part of the power struggle between Antigonus of the Hasmoneans who had sought their aid and Herod, who was a son of the converted Antipater the Idumaean and was being supported by the Romans.

=== After Maresha: Beth Gabra/Eleutheropolis ===
After the demise of Maresha, the Idumean/Jewish town of Beth Gabra or Beit Guvrin succeeded it as the main settlement in the area. Shaken by two successive and disastrous Jewish revolts against Roman rule in the 1st and 2nd centuries, the town recovered its importance only at the beginning of the 3rd century when it was re-established as a Roman city under the new name of Eleutheropolis. By the time of Eusebius of Caesarea (d. 340 CE), Maresha itself was already a deserted place: he mentions the city in his Onomasticon, saying that it was at a distance of "two milestones from Eleutheropolis".

=== Modern era ===
The Palestinian Arab village Bayt Jibrin, the Arabized form of Beth Gabra, was depopulated during the 1948 Arab-Israeli war. In 1949 Kibbutz Beit Guvrin was established on part of Bayt Jibrin's lands. Most of the archaeologically important areas of ancient Maresha and Beit Guvrin/Eleutheropolis are now part of the Beit Guvrin-Maresha National Park.

== Archaeology ==
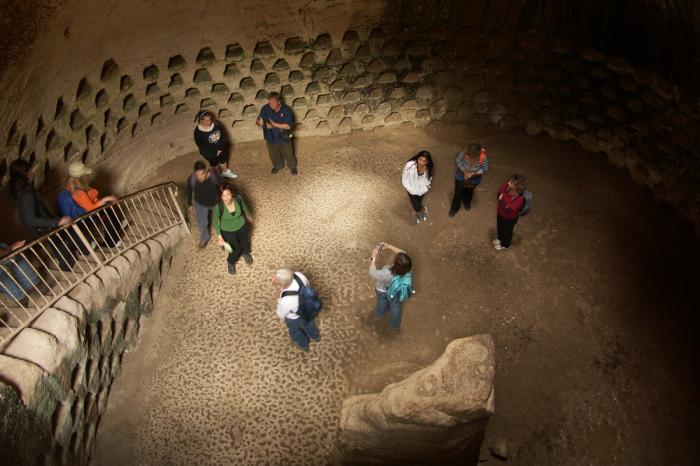

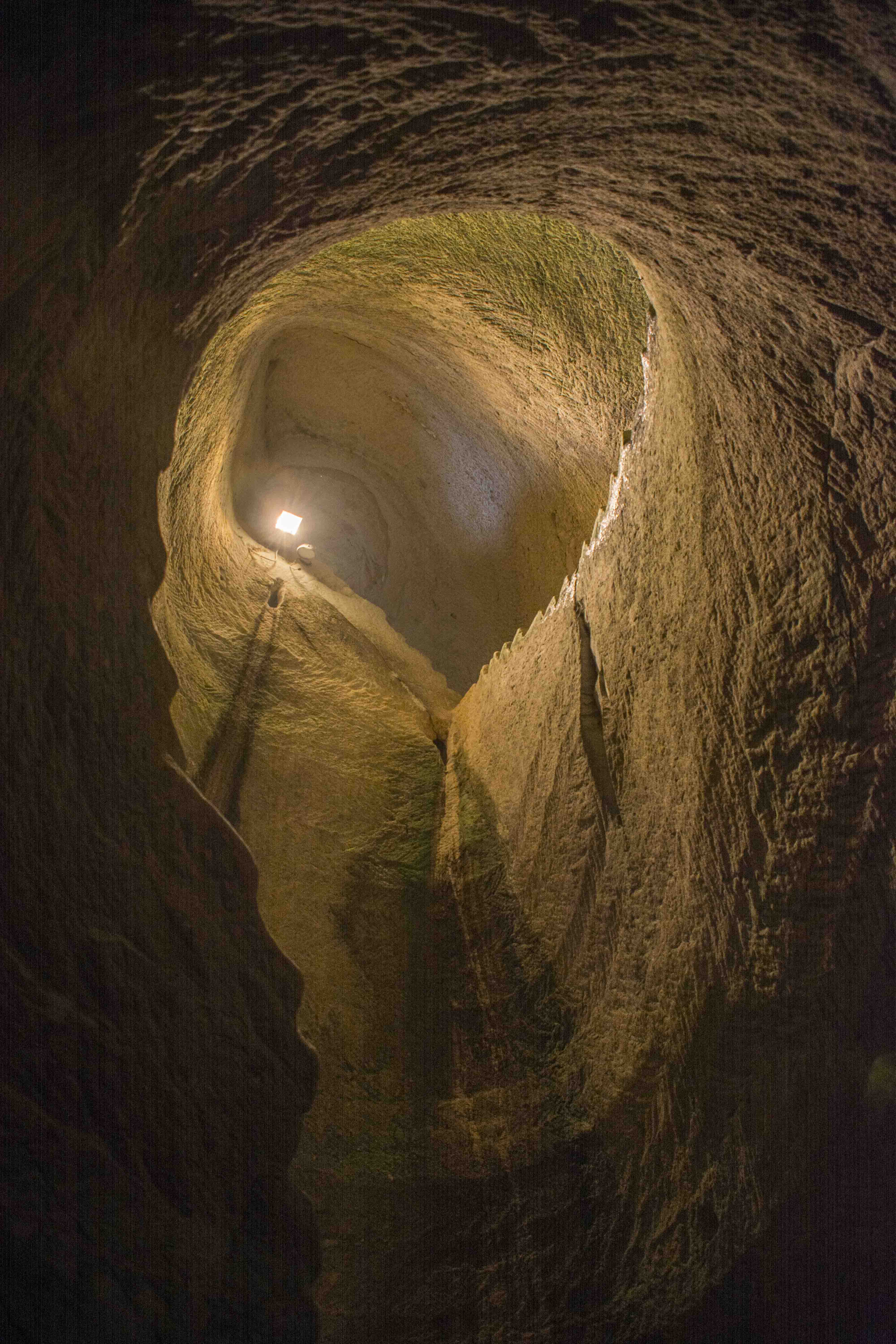
Bell cave

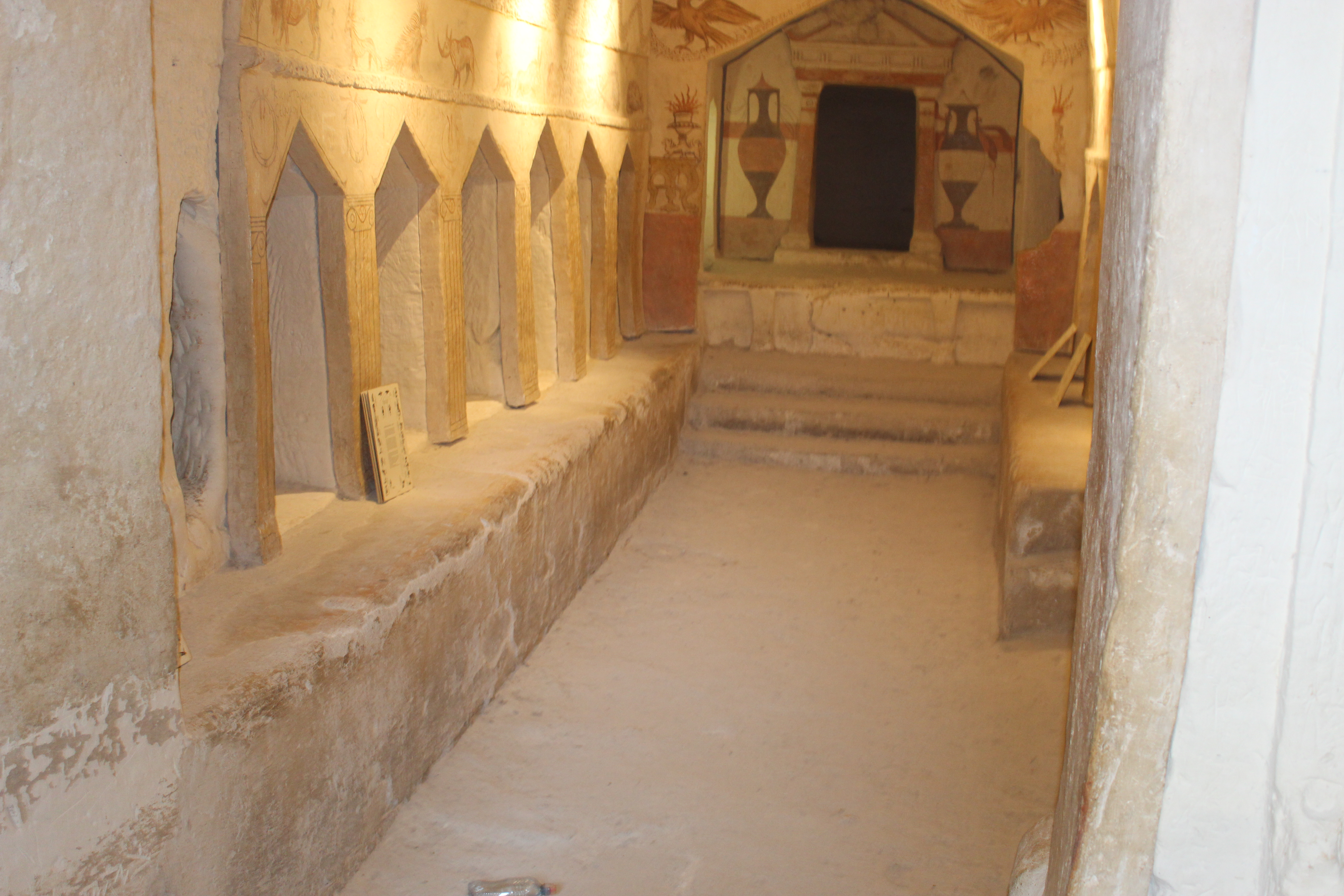
Sidonian burial chamber, the family tomb of Apollophanes

Archaeological excavations have been conducted at the site from 1972 to 2002 by Amos Kloner and from 2002 until 2014, by Bernie Alpert and Ian Stern, initially on behalf of the Archaeological Seminars Institute and the Israel Antiquities Authority. From 2014 excavation and publication work continued on behalf of the Nelson Glueck School of Biblical Archaeology of Hebrew Union College-Jewish Institute of Religion. Less than 10 percent of the caves surrounding Tel Maresha have been excavated. Located some 400 meters above sea level, the bedrock is soft chalk, lending itself to the hewing of caves which were used as quarries, cisterns, tombs, animal mangers, olive presses and dovecots (columbaria). Many of the caves are linked by an underground maze of passageways.

In the necropolis at Marisa, there is a large family tomb, richly decorated with colorful frescoes, loosely known as "the Sidonian Tomb" (or the Apollophanes Cave) due to an inscription reading "Apollophanes son of Sesmaios, archon of the Sidonians at Marisa". Apollophanes is a Greek name also known from the Zenon Papyri that combines the name of the Greek deity Apollo with the word phanes, meaning "appearing", and is marked with the ethnic identifier "Arab" (Αραψ) there. The adoption of Greek names by local inhabitants of Hellenistic Palestine was common, and one of Appollophanes' daughters who is interred in the same tomb is named Demetria. Sesmaois, the name of Appolophanes' father, is based on the Semitic root sms meaning "sun", which was also the name for the deity Shamash. This name, here in its Hellenized form (with the -ois suffix), also appears on two other artifacts discovered in Marisa, namely ostraca dated to the 5th and 4th centuries BCE that are inscribed in Aramaic. Five other family members interred in the tomb carry Idumean and Nabataean names: Sabo, Baba, Babata, Ammoios, and Kosnatanos. Kosnatanos is a Hellenized version of a compound name composed of Qos, the storm deity, and the Semitic root ntn, meaning "to give".

During excavations at Tel Maresha, archaeologists uncovered a lead weight with a Greek inscription that read: "Year 170 (corresponding to 143/2 BCE), the agoranomos [= "market inspector"] being Antipater, son of Heliodorus, and Aristodamus, son of Ariston (?)." The calendar year is written according to the Seleucid era counting, during which same year Simon Thassi of the Hasmonean dynasty assumed power.

Among the major archaeological finds at this site is the Heliodorus Stele. This stele recounts events in Judaea prior to the Maccabean revolt and offers important historical evidence for events that would precede events which modern day Jews commemorate during the holiday of Chanukah.

Approximately 500 ostraca were found in Tell Maresha alone, 400 of which discovered since 2000. Included among these are both dated and undated dockets, tags with personal names and a number of letters of correspondence.

Excavations at Maresha also uncovered eighteen carved representations of circumcised phalli, nearly all made of local chalk. Found in unstratified secondary fills, these life-sized, apparently erect models stand out because depictions of circumcision are almost unknown in Hellenistic art, where an exposed glans was viewed as indecent. Since the objects date to before the Hasmonean conquest of Idumaea, they call into question Josephus's claim that the Idumaeans adopted circumcision through forced Judaization under John Hyrcanus (perhaps in line with Strabo, who depicts the Idumaean conversion as voluntary and makes no mention of forced circumcision). The finds instead align with earlier evidence–such as the Zenon papyri and biblical passages referring to circumcision among the Edomites–indicating that the practice was already established locally. The Hasmonean expansion may therefore have redefined circumcision's symbolic meaning, rather than introducing the rite itself.

In 2022, a large number of knucklebones were found. Some were used to play games (for example, knucklebones) and others to contact the gods (astragalomancy). Those that bear writing were in Greek.

== Tel Maresha and national park ==
Today Maresha is part of the Israeli national park of Beit Guvrin. Many of the ancient city's olive presses, columbaria and water cisterns can still be seen. Furthermore, the Archaeological Seminars Institute, under the license of the Israel Antiquities Authority, conducts excavations of Maresha's many quarried systems, and invites visitors to participate.

== See also ==
- Beit Guvrin-Maresha National Park
- Bayt Jibrin – for the nearby ancient city and later village
- Kibbutz Beit Guvrin
- Archaeology of Israel
- Tourism in Israel

== Gallery ==
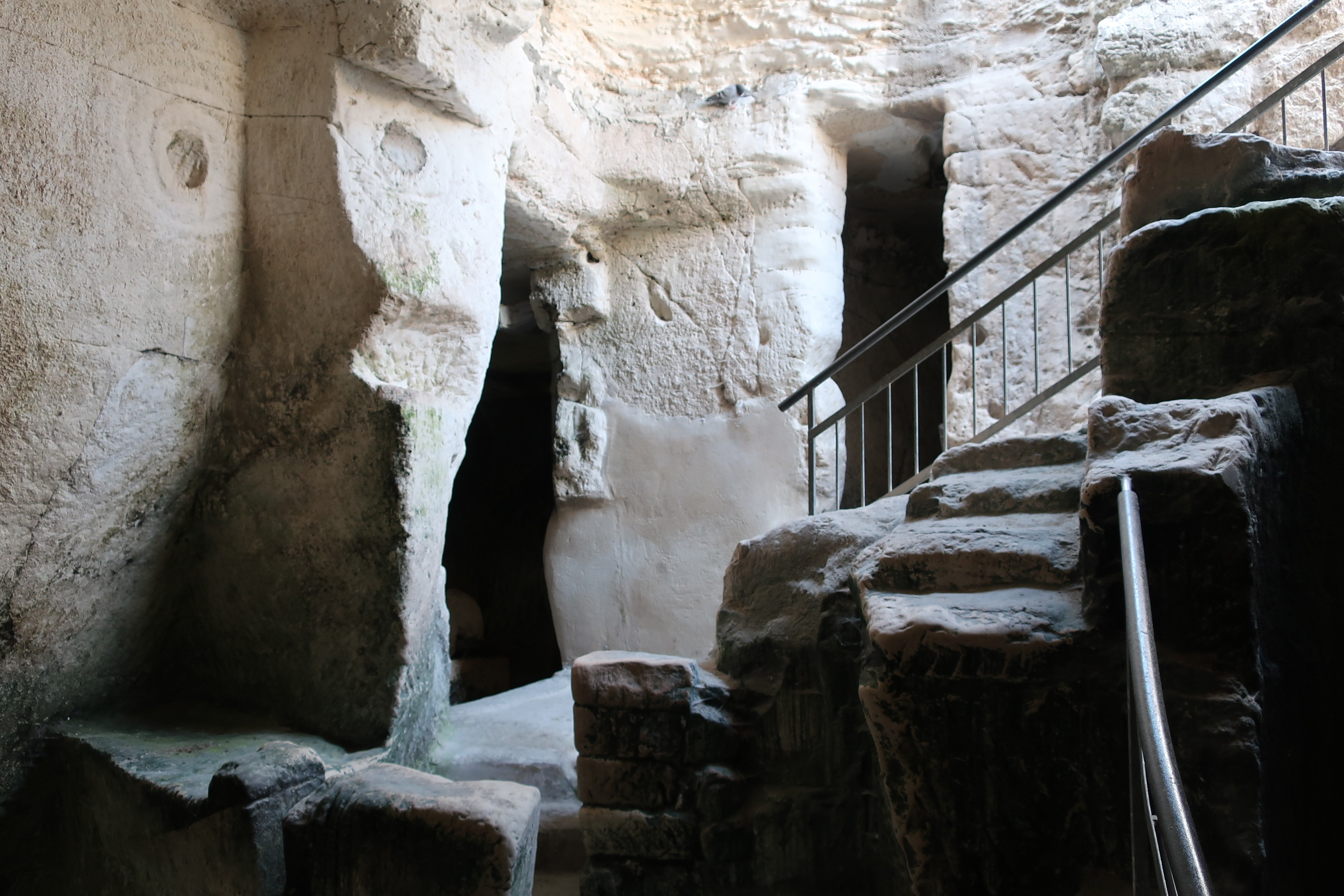

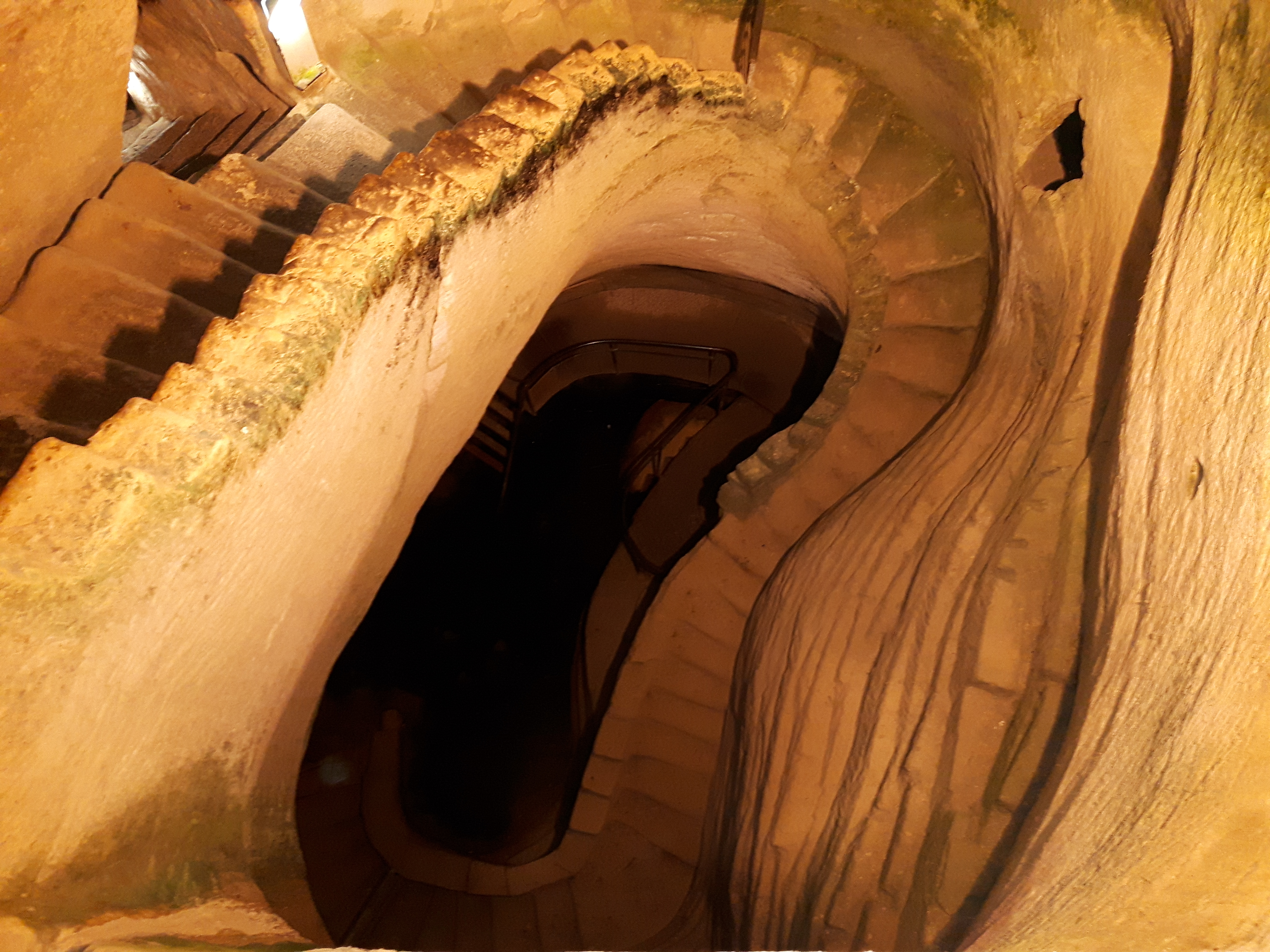
Stairway leading down an ancient quarry Extensive cave dwellings at Tell Maresha

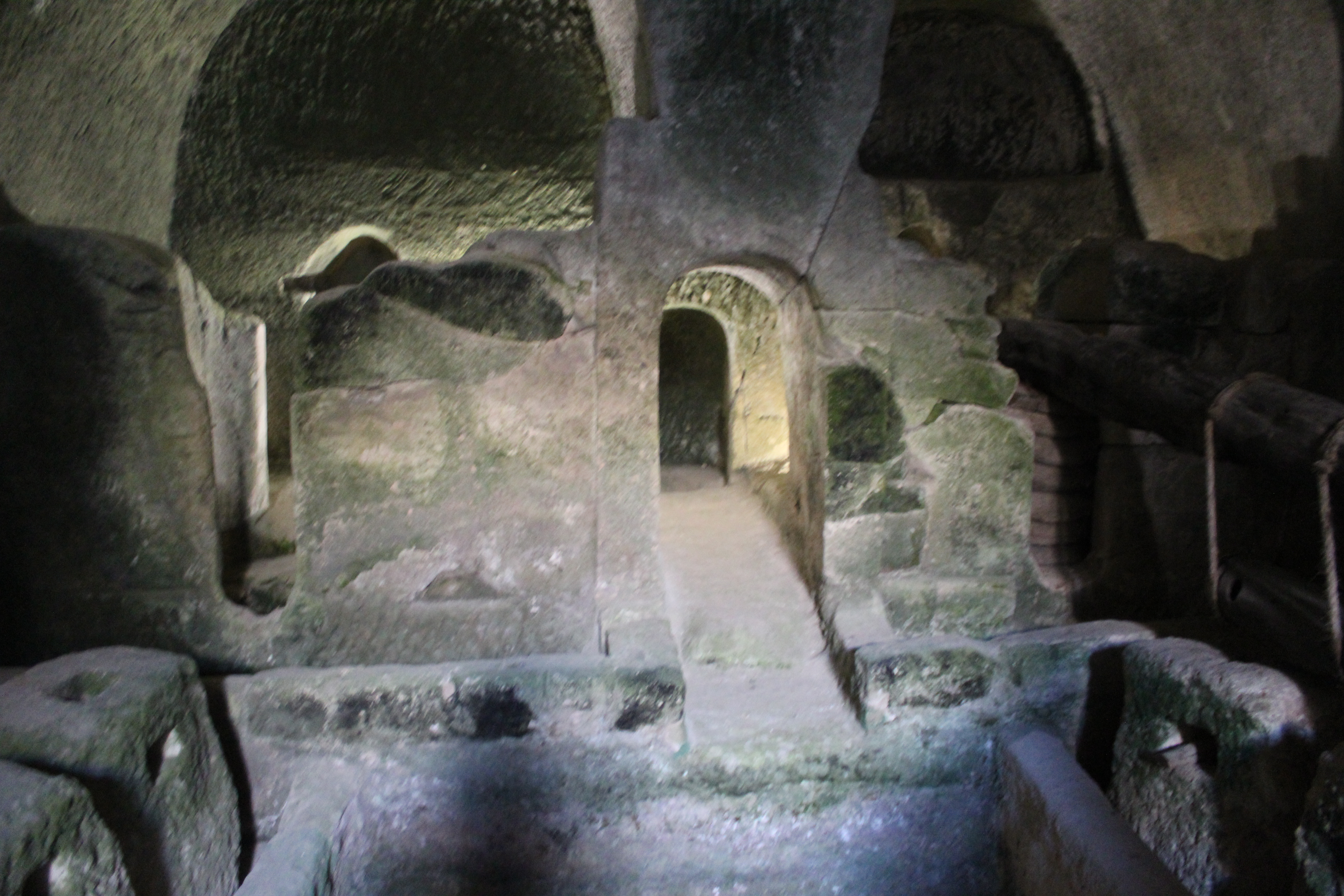
Vast underground chambers at Tell Maresha

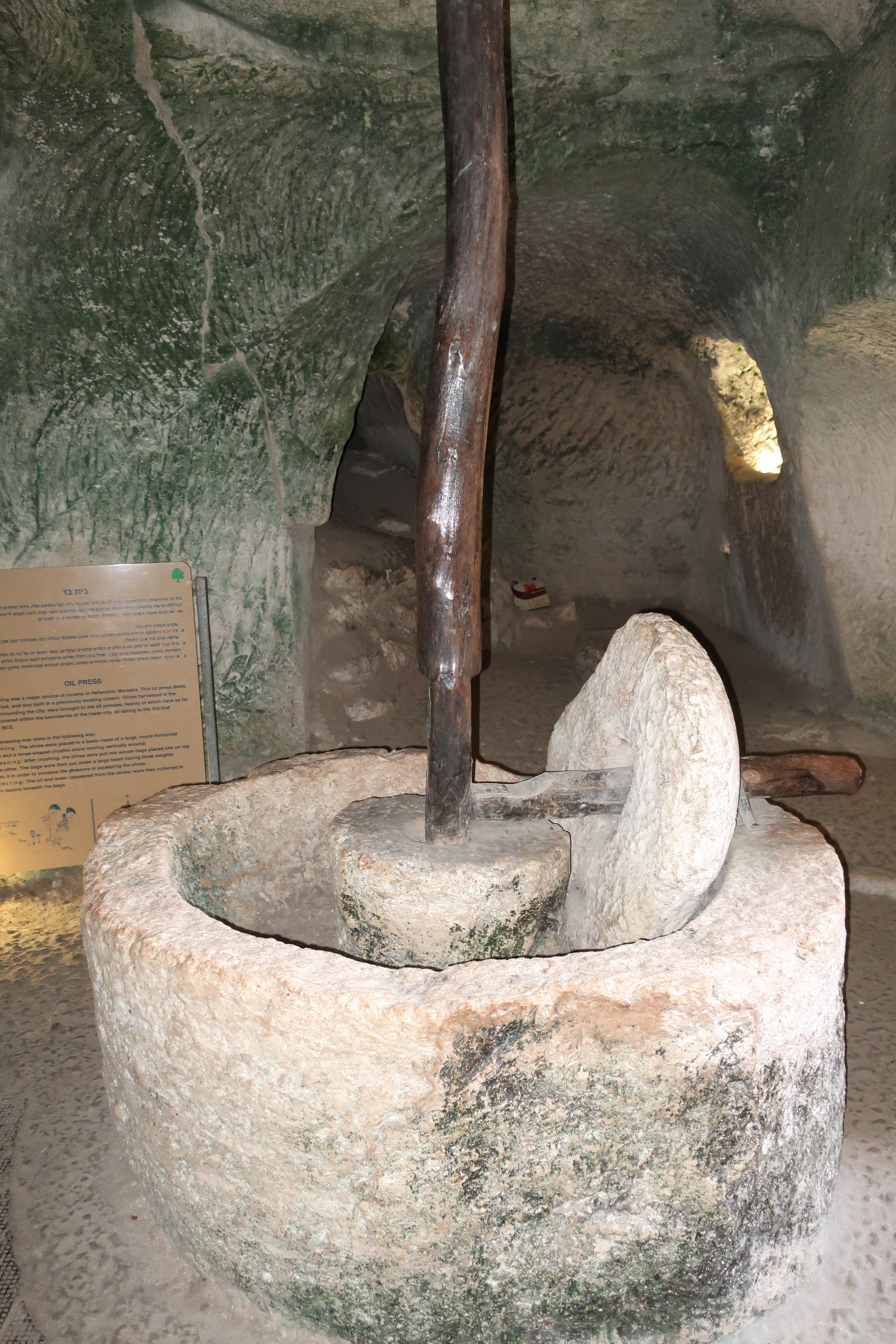
An old olive press at Tell Maresha

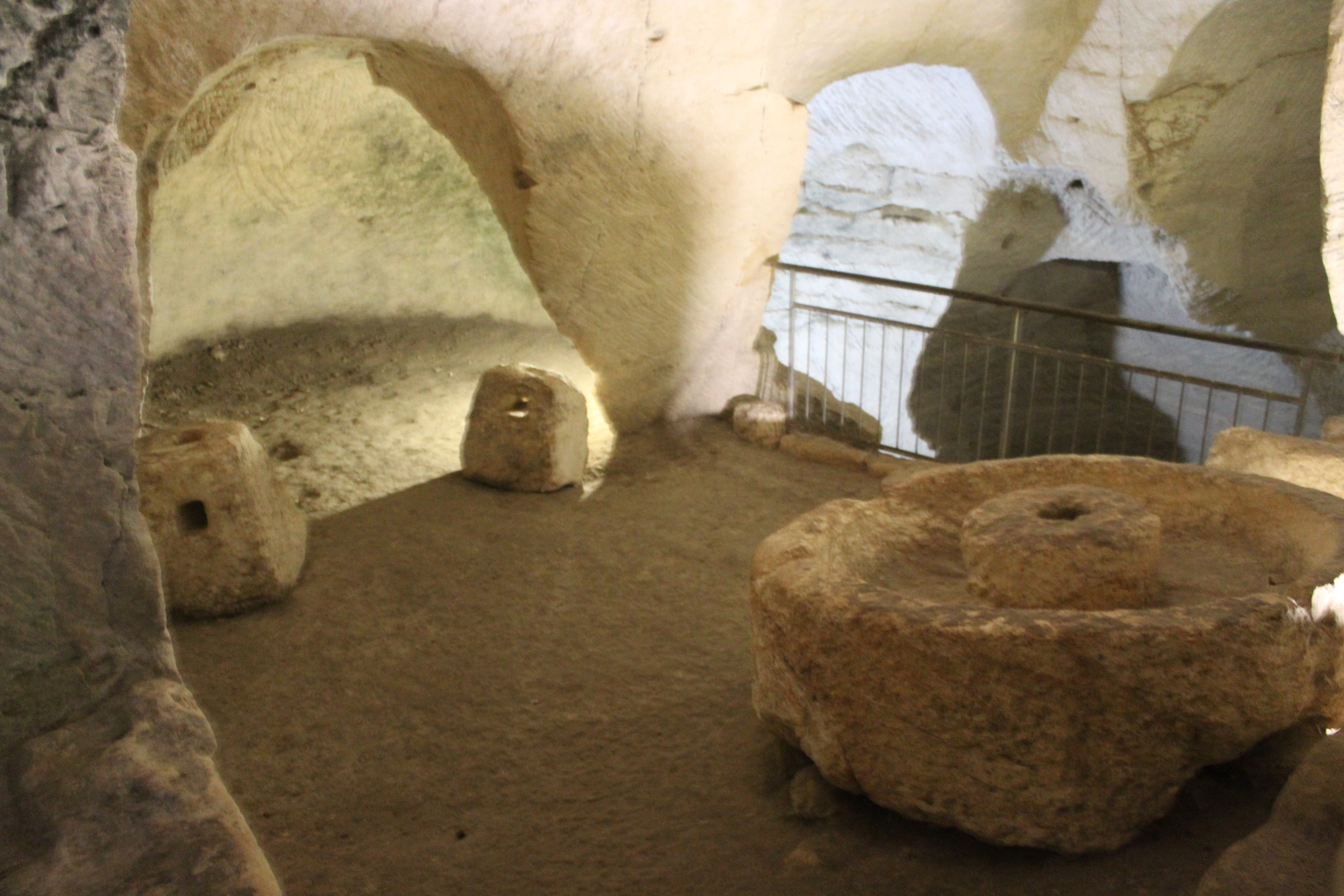
Inner recess of cave dwelling

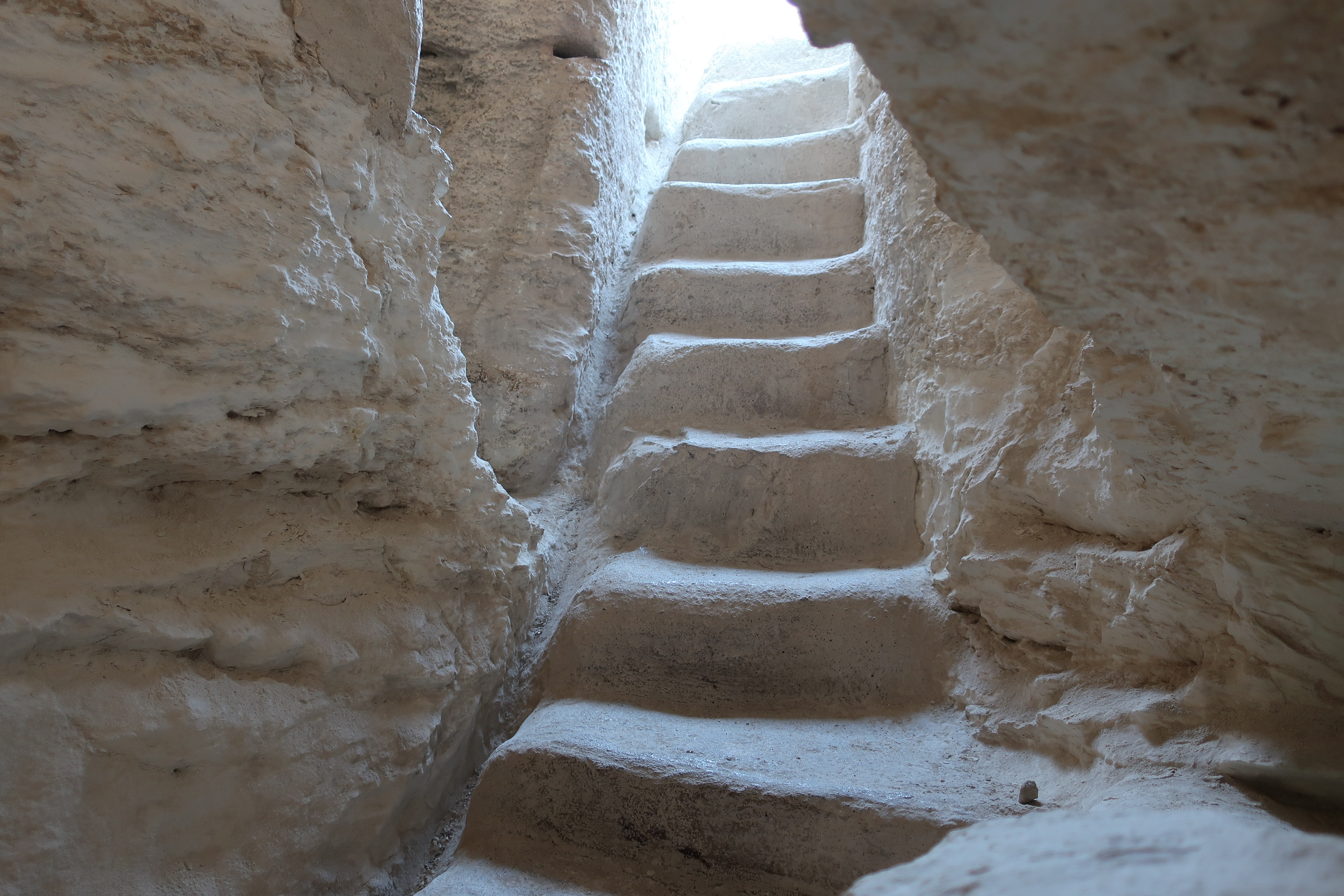
Staircase at ruin Khirbet Sandahannah (now Tell Maresha)

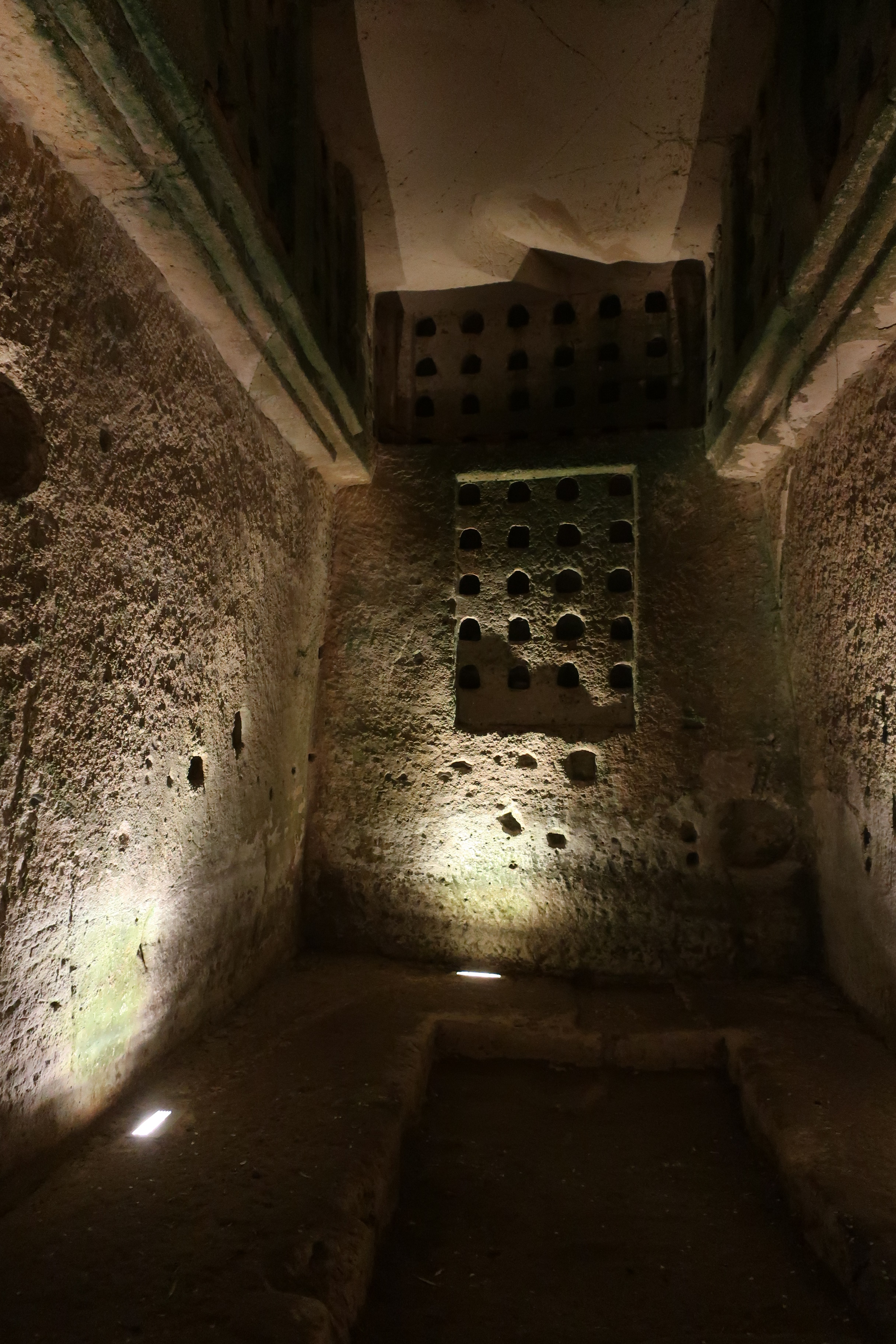
Columbarium (dovecote) in Maresha

== Bibliography ==
- Kloner, Amos, Maresha Excavations Final Report I: Subterranean Complexes 21, 44, 70 (Jerusalem, Israel Antiquities Authority, 2003).
- Jacobson, D. M., The Hellenistic Paintings of Marisa (London, Palestine Exploration Fund, 2005).
- Rainey, A.F. (1983). "The Biblical Shephelah of Judah". Bulletin of the American Schools of Oriental Research. 251 (251). The University of Chicago Press on behalf of The American Schools of Oriental Research: 1–22. doi:10.2307/1356823. JSTOR 1356823.
- Stern, Ian, Excavations at Maresha Subterranean Complex 169. Final Report Seasons 2000–2016. (Annual of the Nelson Glueck School of Biblical Archaeology No. XI). Jerusalem, 2019.
