= Frederick J. Bliss =

American archaeologist

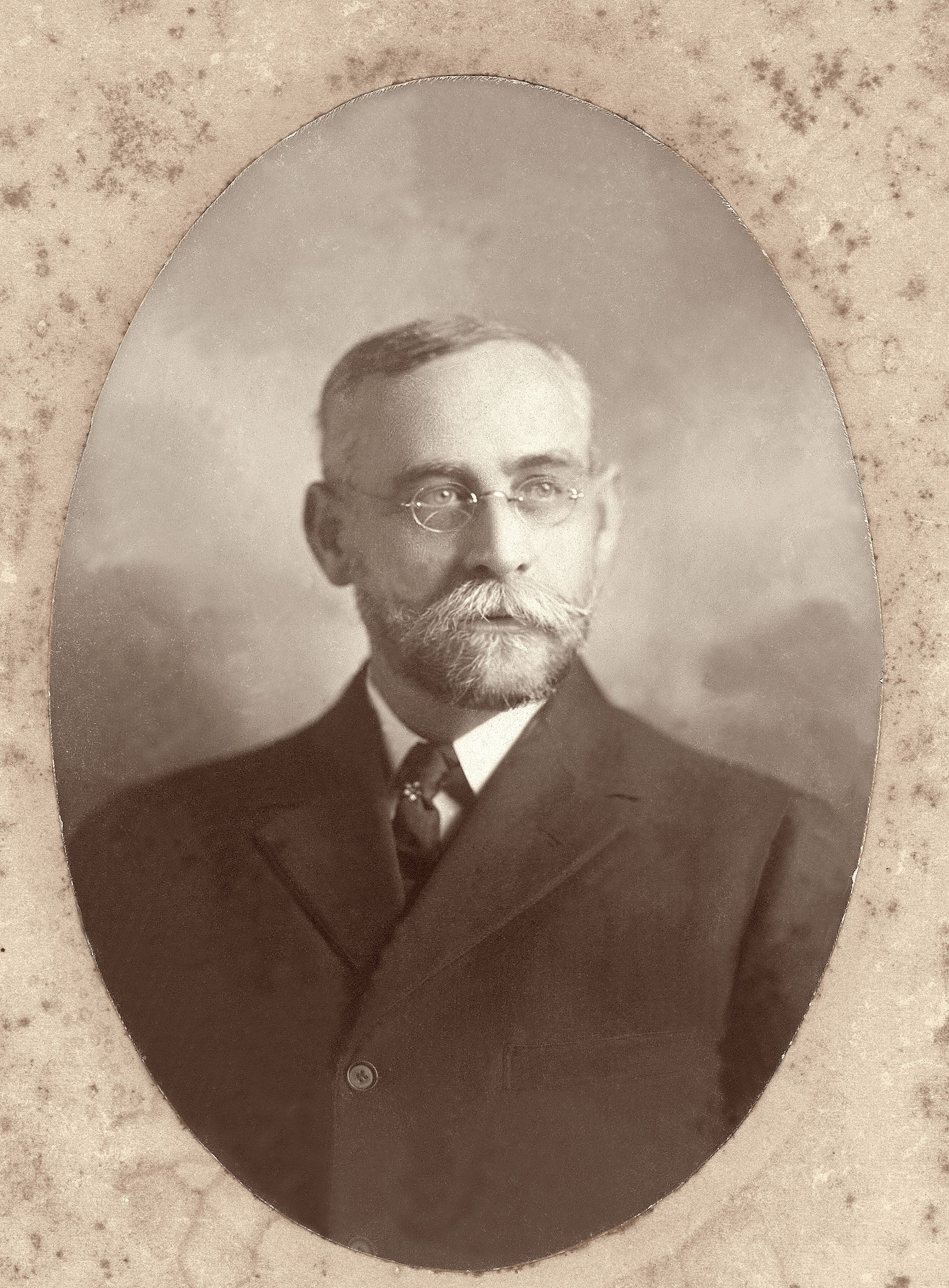
Frederick J. Bliss

Frederick Jones Bliss (22 January 1859 – 3 June 1937) was an American archaeologist.

== Biography ==
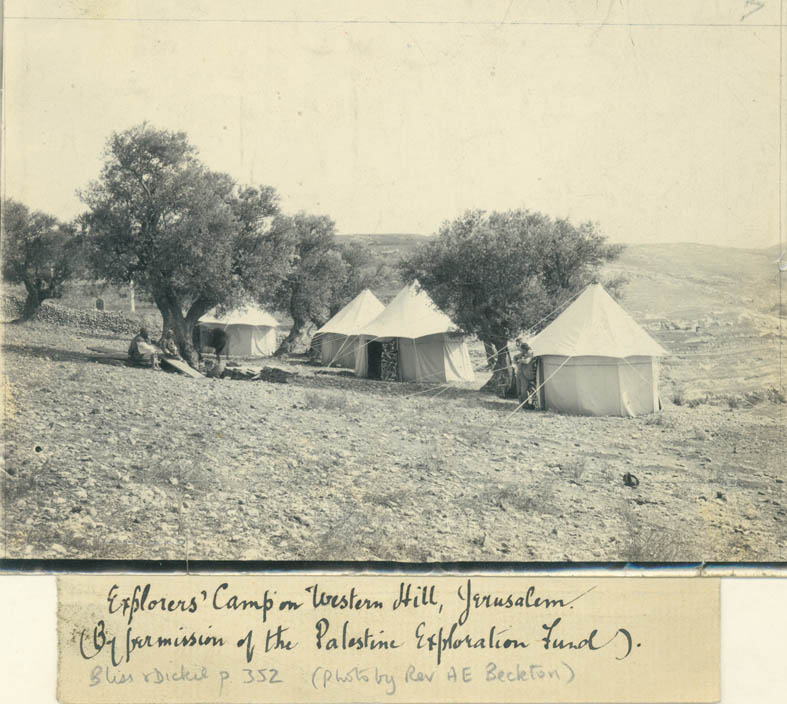
The camp of Bliss on Mount Zion 1894-1897

He was born in Mount Lebanon, Syria, on 22 January 1859. His father, Daniel Bliss, was first a Congregational missionary and later president of the Syrian Protestant College, the future American University of Beirut. Frederick J. graduated from Amherst College (1880) and then taught at the Syrian Protestant College, thereafter attending Union Theological Seminary. After training under Flinders Petrie in Egypt, Bliss became involved with the Palestine Exploration Fund working in the field of Biblical archaeology at the site of Tell el-Hesi between 1894 and 1897, while concurrently leading an expedition that dug in Jerusalem, where he collaborated with A. C. Dickie. Between 1898 and 1900, along with R.A.S. Macalister, Bliss excavated several sites in the Shephelah region of modern Israel, helping to improve the chronology of the region. His excavation reports appeared frequently in the Quarterly Statement of the Palestine Exploration Fund, and included the first jar handle stamped by one of the Hebron LMLK seals (in 1899, this was also the first one with a 4-winged icon) as well as the first complete MMST inscription (in 1900). He was dismissed as the head of the Fund in 1900 due to a disagreement with his peers over the handling of artefacts retrieved from archaeological digs and their transfer to Istanbul at the behest of the Ottoman authority. After the publication of his and Macalister's Excavations in Palestine in 1902, he was not active in the field.

== Bibliography ==
- Hallote, Rachel (2006). Bible, Map And Spade: The American Palestine Exploration Society, Frederick Jones Bliss and the Forgotten Story of Early American Biblical Archaeology. Gorgias Press. ISBN 978-1-59333-347-8.
