= Ziph (Bible) =

Ancient town in Judea mentioned in the Hebrew Bible

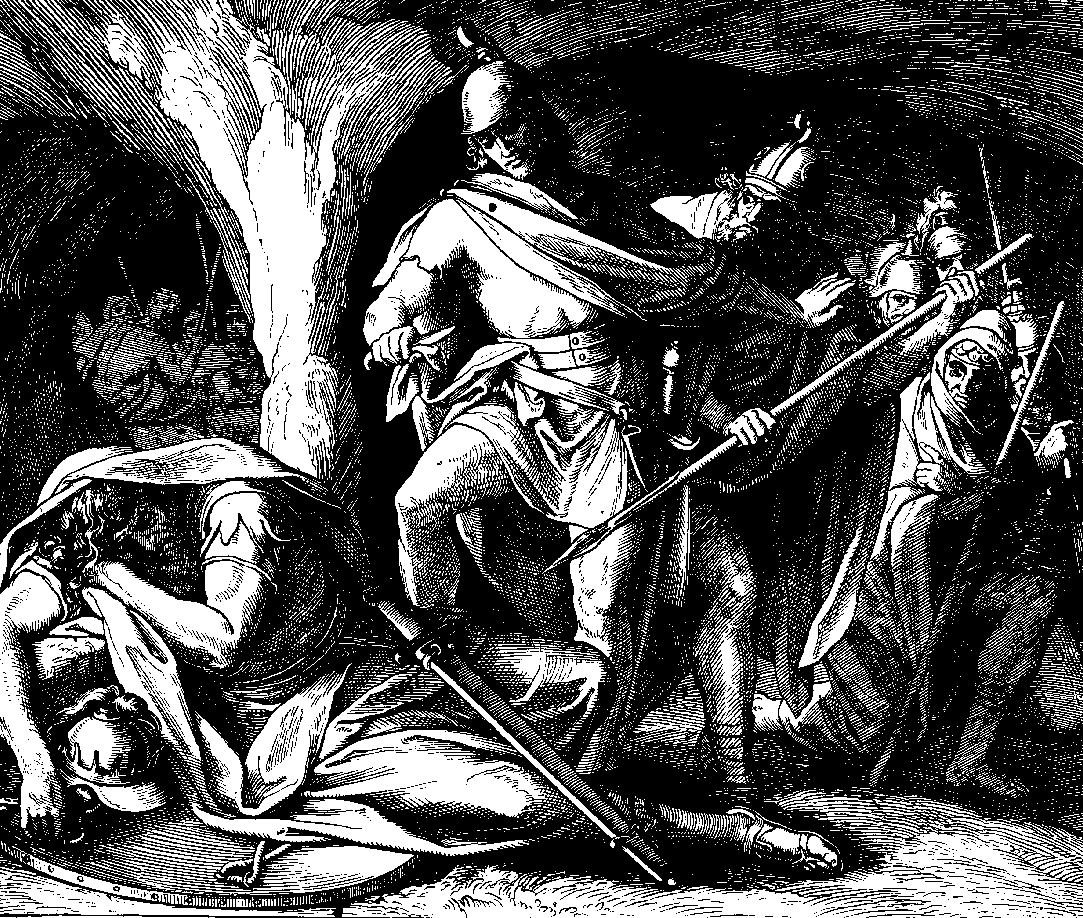
David Spares Saul's Life, 1860 woodcut by Julius Schnorr von Karolsfeld

Ziph (Hebrew: זיף, romanized: Zîp̄) was a town of Judah, located in the Judean Mountains (Joshua 15:55) south-east of Hebron. According to the biblical narrative in 1 Samuel 23, David hid himself from Saul here (1 Samuel 23:19; see also Psalm 54). Saul took his "chosen men of Israel" into the wilderness of Ziph in search of David. The name of Zif is found about four miles south of Hebron, attached to a rounded hill of some 100 feet in height, which is called Tell Zif. Its name appears on a number of LMLK seals along with those of Hebron, Socoh and MMST. It has been identified as the Palestinian village of Zif, Hebron. N

== Archaeology ==
Tel Ziph near Zif, Hebron has been identified as the site of ancient Ziph, with remains of a Byzantine era church.

Scholars debate the interpretation of the word Z(Y)F on LMLK seals. It may be a reference to an economic center established at the site south-east of Hebron during the reign of King Hezekiah (circa 700 BC), or it may be a literal votive inscription meaning, "pinnacle", or "supply".

== See also ==
- Zif, the modern-day Palestinian village near Hebron
