= LMLK seal =

Ancient Hebrew seal stamped on Judahite jars

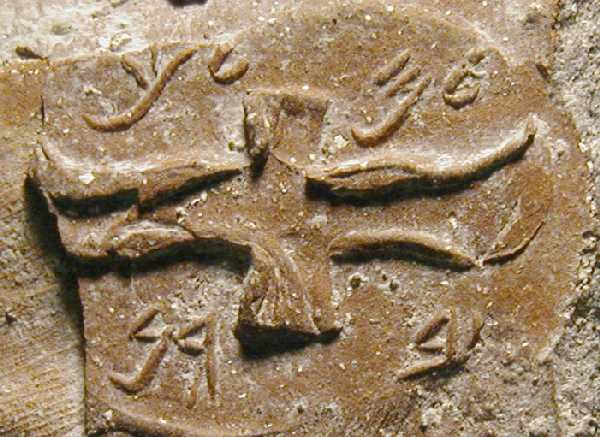
Type H2D LMLK stamp, 2003

The LMLK seal appears on the handles of several large storage jars from the Kingdom of Judah, where it was first issued during the reign of Hezekiah around 700 BCE. Seals bearing these four Paleo-Hebrew letters, as well as a symbol resembling a winged sun, have been discovered primarily on unearthed artifacts in and around Jerusalem, with some in northern Israel. They form part of a larger group of Canaanite and Aramaic seal inscriptions.

Several complete jars were found in situ at the ancient city of Lachish, where they were buried underneath a destruction layer caused by Sennacherib, who reigned over the Neo-Assyrian Empire from 705 BCE to 681 BCE. While none of the original stamp seals have been found, some 2,000 impressions made by at least 21 seal types have been published. The iconography of the two- and four-winged symbols are representative of royal symbols whose meaning "was tailored in each kingdom to the local religion and ideology".

== Text ==
LMLK—lamedh, mem, lamedh, kaph—is in the Hebrew language: לַמֶּלֶךְ (vocalized as lamelekh) (Phoenician: 𐤋𐤌𐤋𐤊 lāmed-mēm-lāmed-kāp), which can be translated as:

- "[belonging] to the king" (of Judah)
- "[belonging] to King" (name of a person or deity)
- "[belonging] to the government" (of Judah)
- "[to be sent] to the king"

As a prepositional prefix, the lāmed (𐤋) has either a genitive or dative function, and the "to" in each of the above readings can also be read as "for" or "of". The other three letters form the word melekh; as shown above, its translation can refer to a specific king, to any king, or to the king's government.

A number of jars say "lmlk Ziph", "lmlk Hebron", "lmlk Socoh", and "lmlk mmst" (whose identification is unknown). These jars were all manufactured in a single site in the Shephelah, possibly at Lachish, under the authority of the king (alluded to in 1 Chronicles 4:23, thus 'lmlk' means 'belonging to the king'), and from there they were sent to each one of the four administrative regions, as indicated by the name of the localities on the jars: Ziph, Hebron, Socoh, and MMST).

== Discovery sites ==
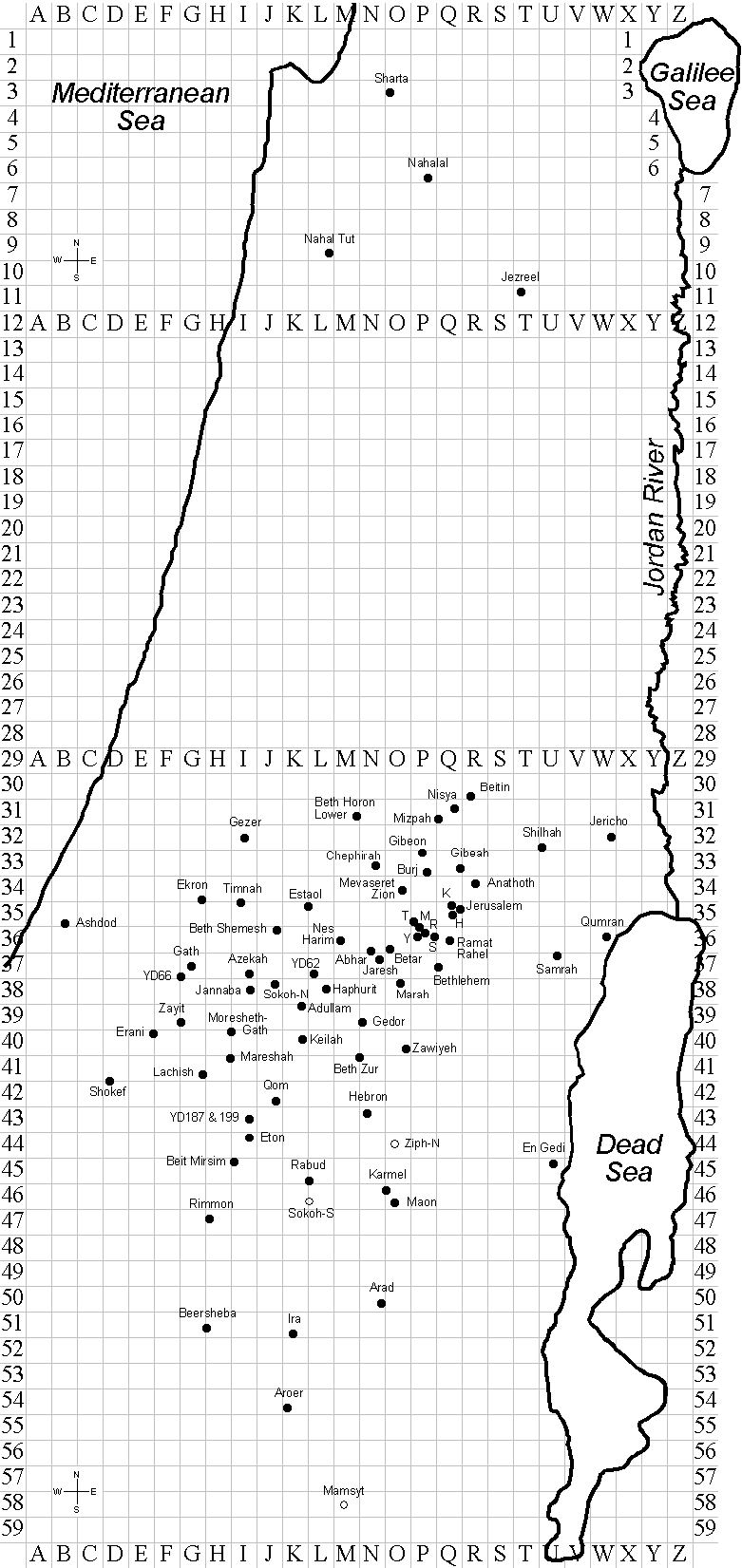
LMLK discovery sites, as of February 2008

Though most of these stamped jar handles have been found in the territory of the Kingdom of Judah (71 sites in the land allotted to Judah, Benjamin, and Simeon), some have also been found in the territory of the Kingdom of Israel (four sites in the northwest region). Over 2,000 stamped jar handles have been found. The 20 sites where the most specimens have been found are:

- Khirbet Qeiyafa – 693
- Tel Lachish – 415
- Jerusalem – 281
- Ramat Rachel – 163
- Mordot Arnona (southern Jerusalem) – 124
- Gibeon – 92
- Mizpah – 88
- Beth Shemesh – 71
- Moresheth-Gath – 39
- Gezer – 37
- Khirbet el-Burj (northwestern Jerusalem) – 24
- Maresha – 19
- Azekah – 18
- Timnah –15
- Gibeah – 14
- Tel Erani – 13
- Hebron – 13
- Sokho (Khirbet Abbad NW of Hebron, not the Sokho SW of Hebron) – 13
- Beth Tzur – 11
- Arad – 9

== Usage theories ==
Beginning with the editio princeps by Charles Warren in 1870, a diverse assortment of theories has been promulgated to explain their function. Since the landmark excavations at Lachish by David Ussishkin during the 1970s, which established the date of the seals to the reign of Hezekiah, the number of feasible explanations has narrowed down to these (all associated with Hezekiah.

- Military rations collected as an emergency during a short period (several months to a few years at most) preceding the Assyrian invasion by Sennacherib
- Government taxes collected throughout the majority of Hezekiah's reign (either 14 or 26 years depending on chronological interpretations) as a long-term economic buildup until the Assyrian invasion by Sennacherib
- Religious tithes collected throughout Hezekiah's 29-year reign in response to his worship reformation following his accession (completely irrespective of the Assyrian invasion by Sennacherib)

In support of the first two theories are the inscriptions, which can be read as the names of four places; in support of the third theory are the geographic statistics, which do not associate any of the four words to a particular place or region other than the entire southern kingdom of Judah. Furthermore, approximately 10–20 percent of the excavated jars and jar handles were stamped.

Depending on which of the above theories are preferred, several other aspects of the operation need interpretation:

- The people who performed the stamping were either government officials working directly for King Hezekiah or Levites and/or priests associated with Solomon's Temple in Jerusalem.
- The icons symbolize either royal stature or a religious nature (Deuteronomy 32:11–12, Ruth 2:12, Psalm 36:7, Psalm 57:1, Psalm 61:4, Psalm 91:4, and Malachi 4:2).
- The super-inscription, LMLK, denotes the Judean government or a specific, divine being (consider its application to the Israelite YHWH as in Psalm 10:16, Isaiah 6:5, and Zechariah 14:9).
- The sub-inscriptions (Hebron, MMST, Socoh, and Ziph) record either 4 places or 4 votive statements.

Engraving styles indicate at least two, possibly five, people made the seals. The 21 types can be grouped together in five or six sets, but they may have been created or utilized in pairs based on quantities of their impressions found so far.

Researchers frequently use a lowercase "x" as a wildcard character when referring to a series such as x4C instead of using an uppercase "G", "H", "M", "S", or "Z" for the first letter designator. Likewise, an "x" can be used for the second letter designator when referring to all seals with the same word, such as H2x in lieu of H2D, H2T, and H2U.

Thus far, significant quantities of x4C, x4L, and x2U stamps have been excavated from below the destruction layer caused by the Assyrian conquest of Sennacherib, but only a single specimen each of the G2T and M2D stamps (excavated from Jerusalem, which was not destroyed by Sennacherib). This suggests that 12 of the 21 seals were made prior to the attack, and the remaining 9 afterwards. The first significant evidence to support this datum came from the landmark excavations at Timnah led by George L. Kelm and Amihai Mazar.

== Additional impressions ==
Several hundred seal impressions made on the same type of jar handle have been found in the same contexts as the LMLK stamps. Over 50 types have been documented, and most of them have a 2-line inscription divided by two somewhat parallel lines. Some have an icon in addition to the inscription; others are strictly anepigraphic (Vaughn 1999).

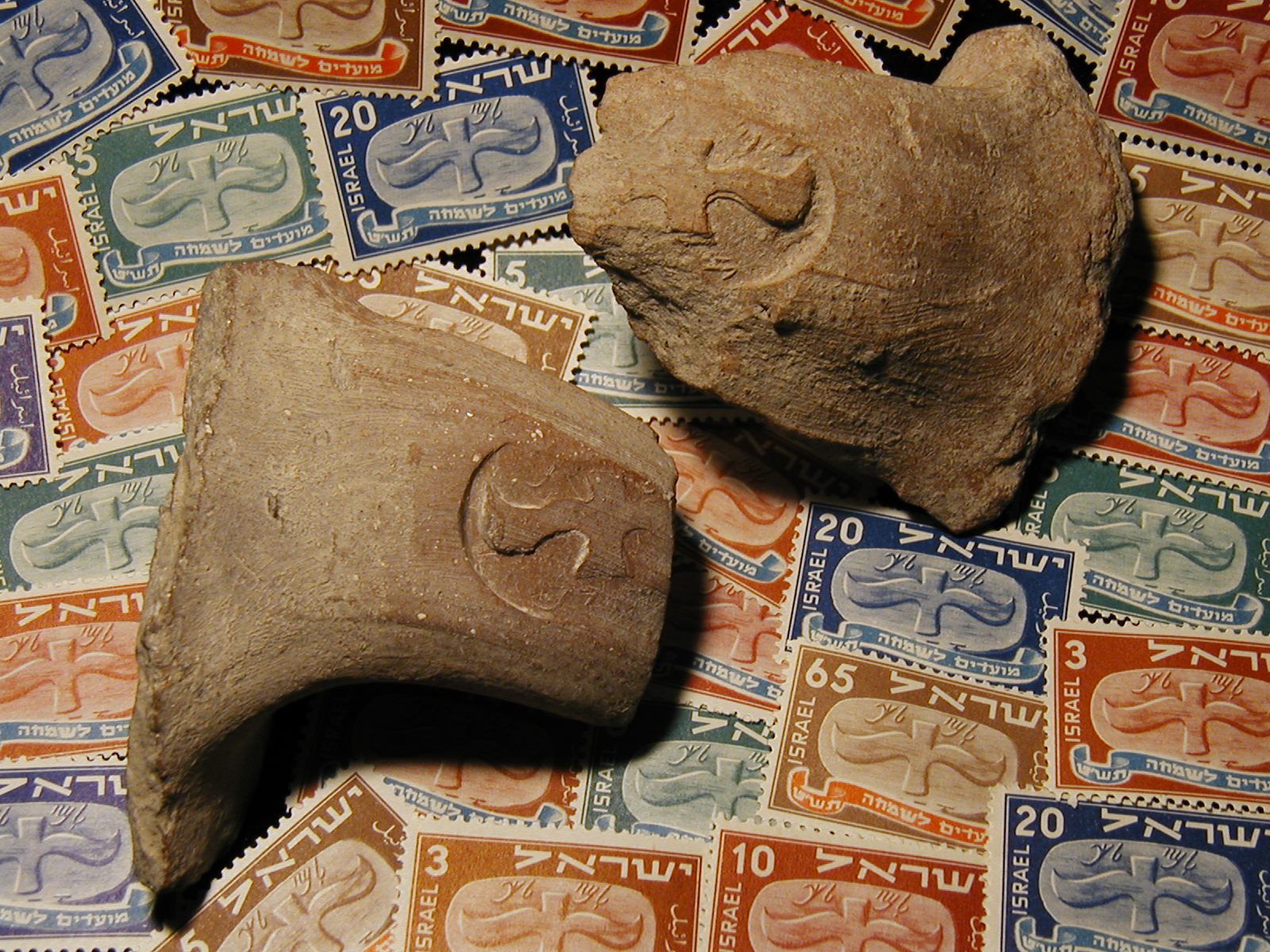
LMLK stamps from the Kingdom of Judah atop LMLK-bearing Israeli postage stamps, 2006

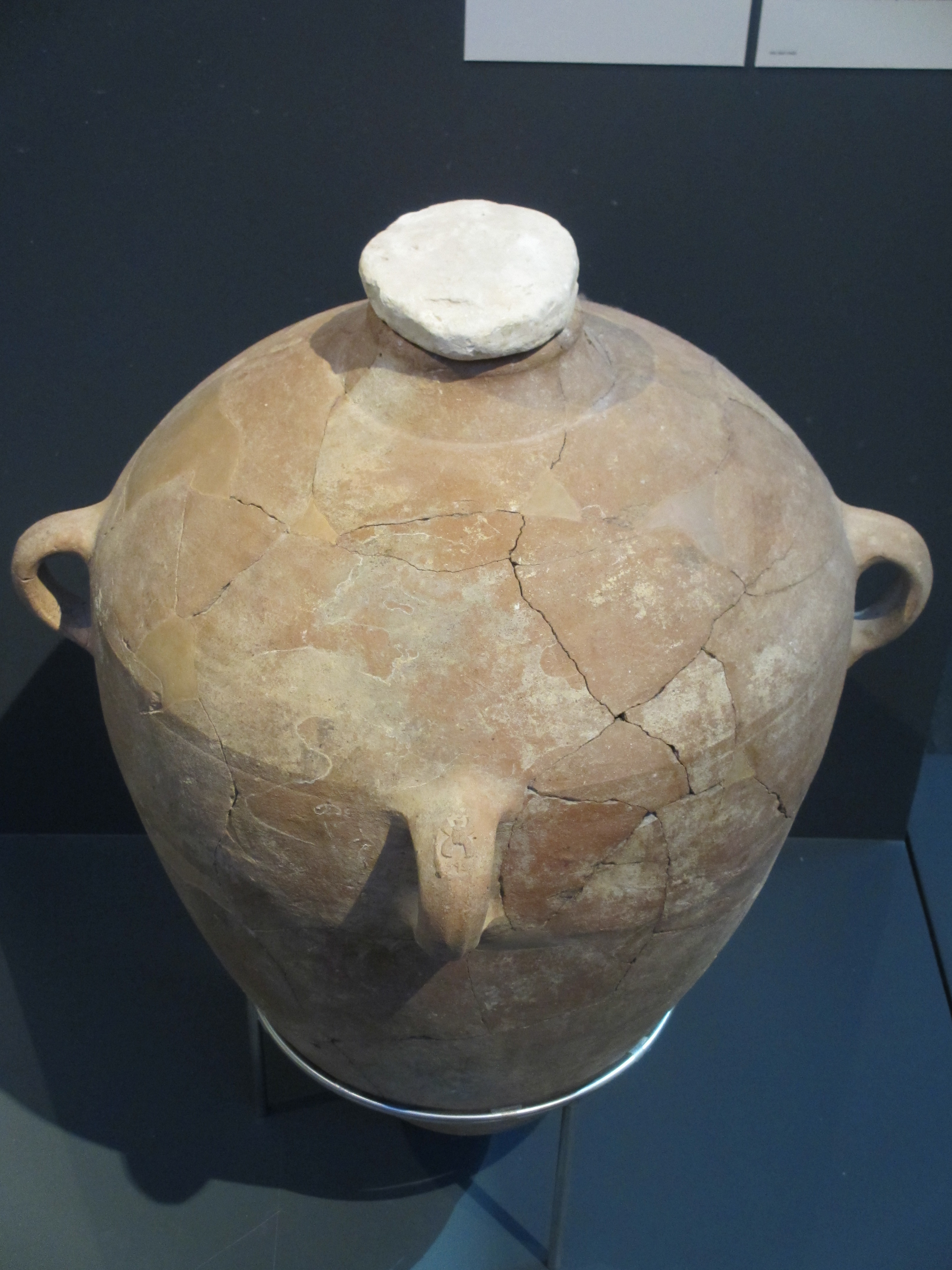
LMLK jar of Hebron on display at the Israel Museum in Jerusalem, 2013

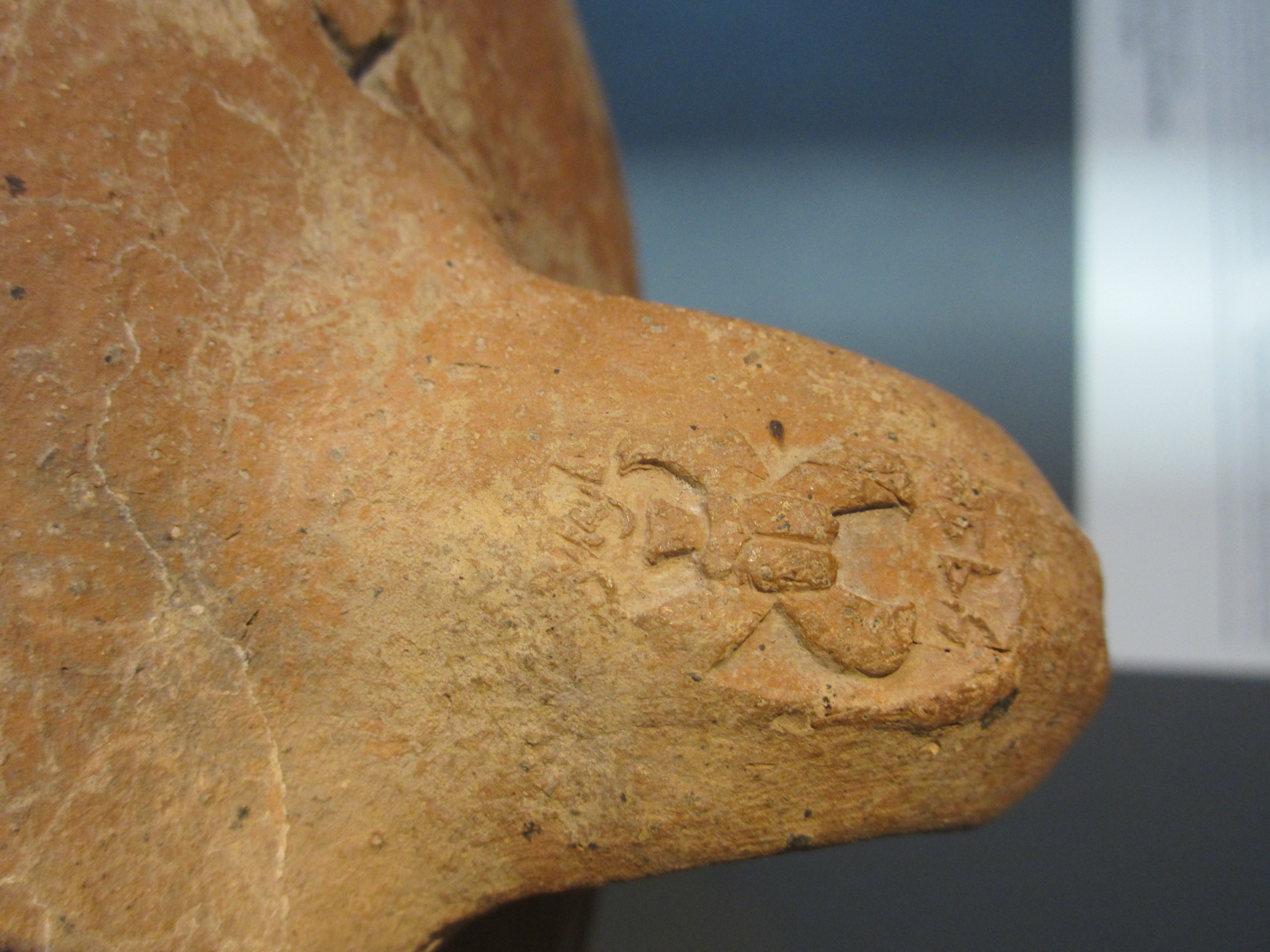
LMLK seal (Hebron) on a jar at the Israel Museum in Jerusalem, 2013

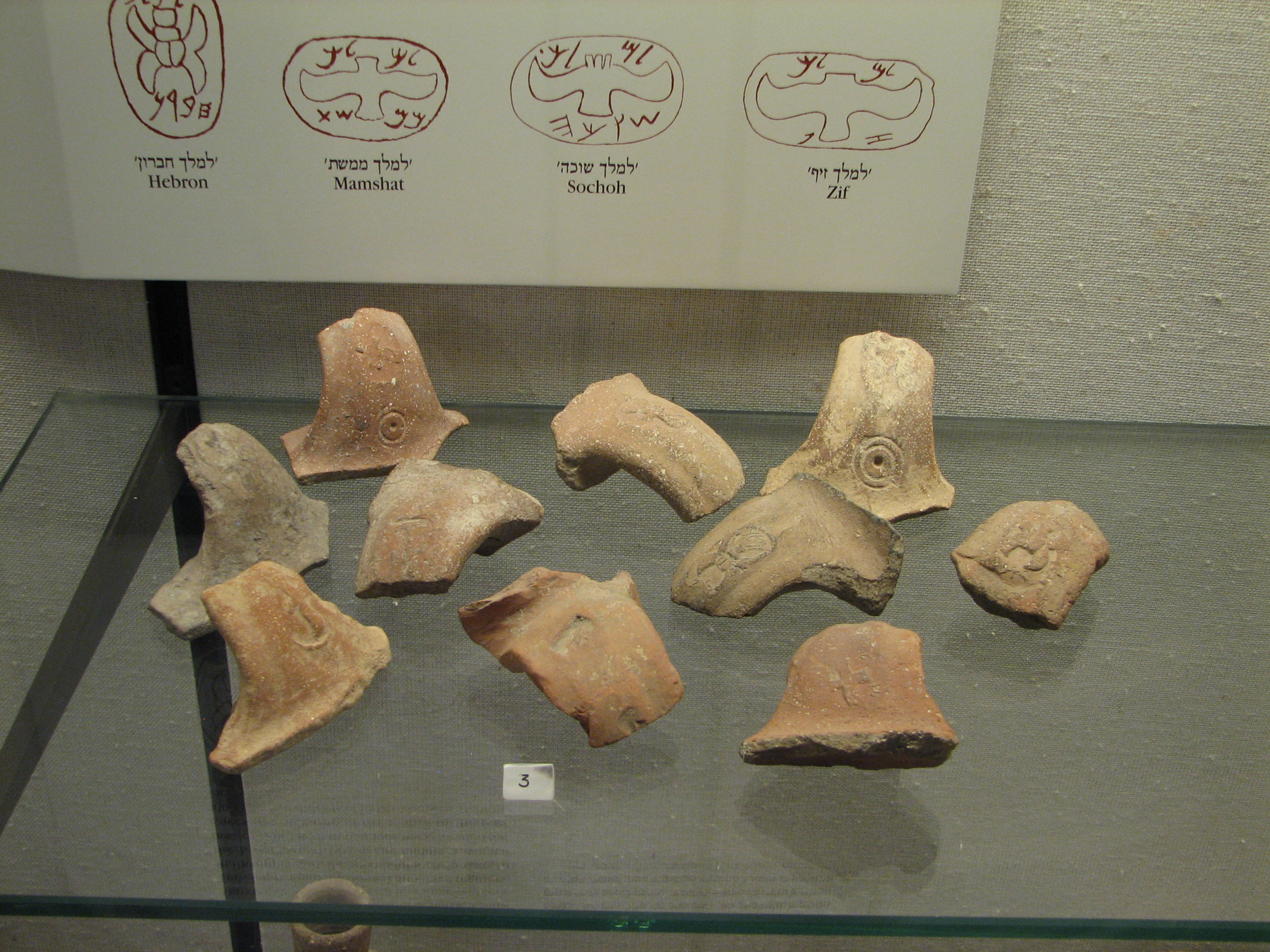
LMLK seals on display at the Hecht Museum in Haifa, 2010

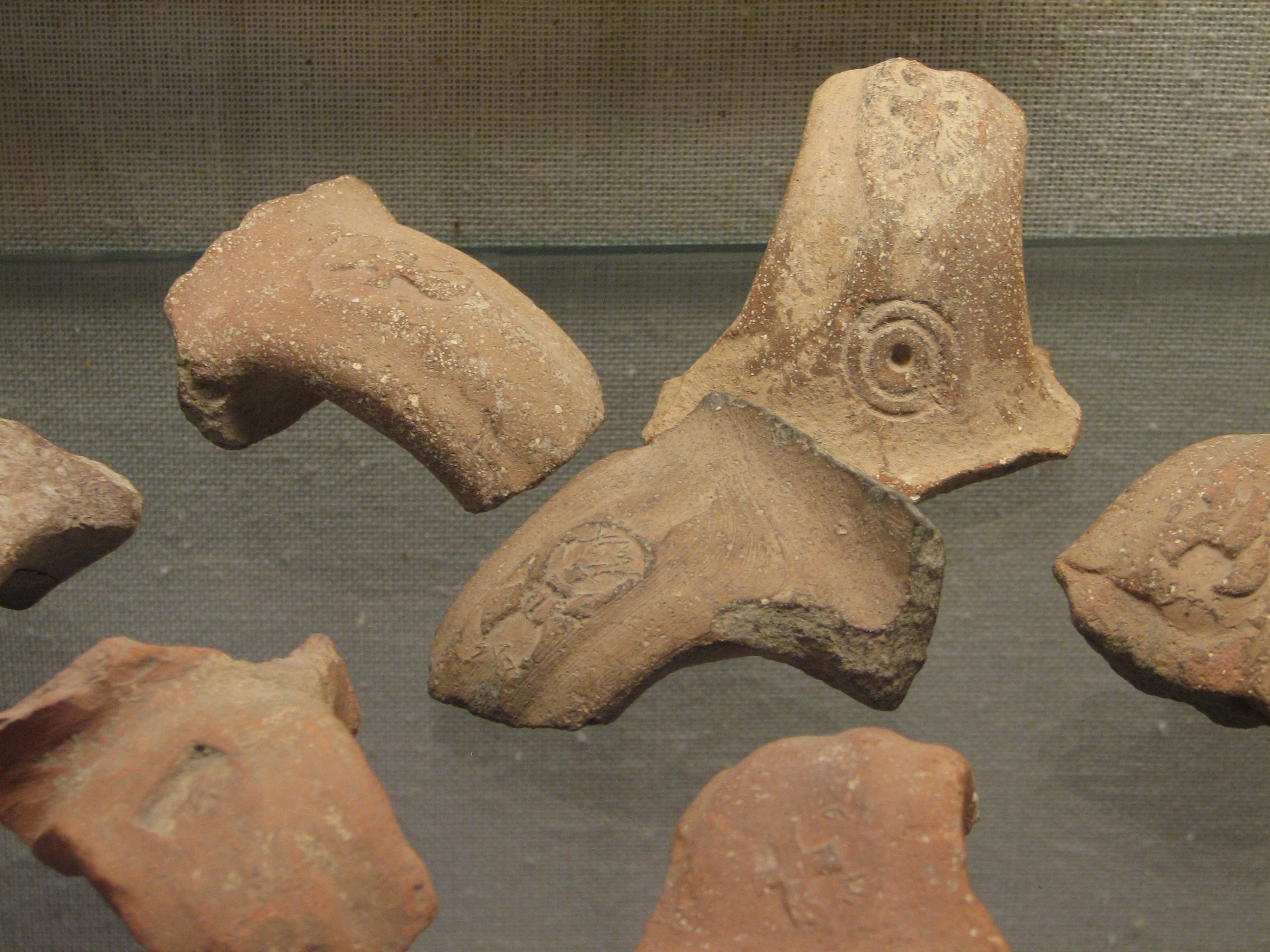
LMLK seals on the display at the Hecht Museum in Haifa, 2010

=== Incisions ===
In addition to the seals, which were stamped in the wet clay before being fired in a kiln, certain other marks were incised on these jar handles:

- Concentric circles (usually two—sometimes only one; sometimes applied to unstamped handles but it is uncertain whether they were ever incised on unstamped jars)
- Plus marks (resembling "+" or "t" or "X")
- Hole marks (resembling the central anchor dot of the concentric circles)
- Drag marks (probably attempts to cancel or obliterate the LMLK stamp)

Hundreds of the handles with the circles have been found, but only a few of the plus, hole, and drag marks. Several LMLK stamps may have had additional inscriptions incised over them containing marks resembling the letters "I V" (hence "Ivy incisions"); however, one or more of these handles may just contain stray Drag marks resembling the letters "I V" with no literate semantics intended.

== Israeli postage stamps ==
In 1948, Israel's postal authority chose the Z2U seal design for the first series of postage stamps to include the name of the renascent state. Five multicolored values (3, 5, 10, 20, and 65-mil denominations; Scott catalog numbers 10-4) were printed in sheets of 300 (six panes of 50). Otte Wallish designed the stamps, which have distinctive tabs written in Hebrew declaring: Flying Scroll: "LMLK" Seal Stamped on the Wine and Oil Jugs Given as Tax to the King. Israel released the stamps on September 26, 1948 in time for the October 4 observance of Rosh Hashanah 5709, the Jewish New Year, and thereby inaugurated its annual series of holiday stamps.

== Reconstructive drawings ==
Types of LMLK seals according to George M. Grena's typology:

H2T

M2T

(reserved
for S2T;
not known
if any
existed)

Z2T

G2T

(reserved
for H2DR;
not known
if any
existed)
(reserved
for M2DR;
not known
if any
existed)

S2DR

(reserved
for Z2DR;
not known
if any
existed)

H2D

M2D

S2DW

Z2D

H2U

M2U

S2U

Z2U

H4L

M4L

S4L

Z4L

H4C

M4C

(reserved
for S4C;
not known
if any
existed)

Z4CI

Z4CY

== See also ==
- Archaeology of Israel
- Biblical archaeology
- List of artifacts significant to the Bible
- Hebrew alphabet
- Phoenician alphabet
