= Adullam =

Archaeological site in Israel

- Khirbat esh-Sheikh Madkur / ʿAīd el Mâ
- 'Eîd el Mieh (Kh. 'Id el-Minya)
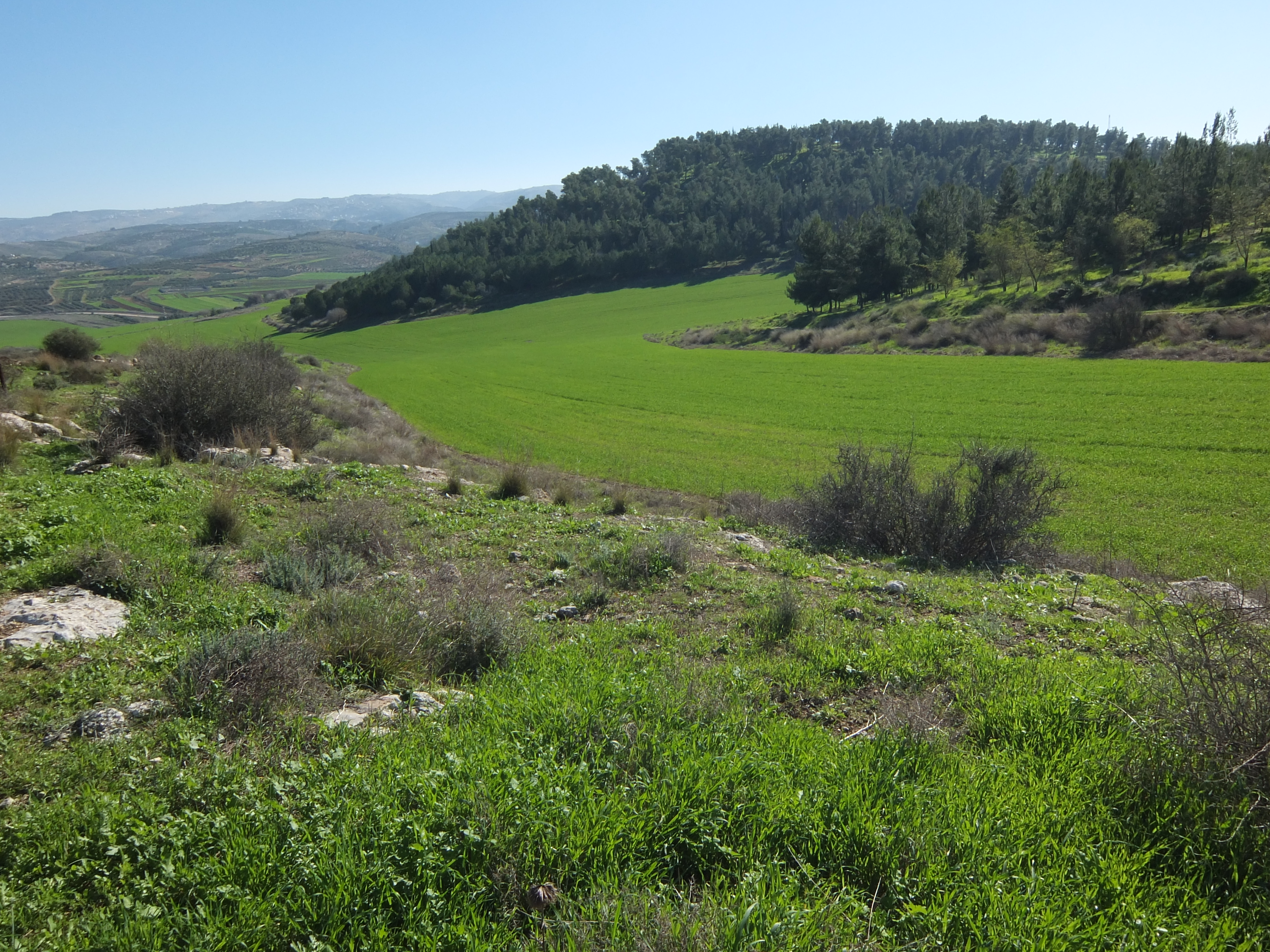
- Pine-covered hill of Adullam, seen from northwest

- Location within Israel
- 31°39′0″N 35°0′9″E
- Periods: Chalcolithic, Early and Late Bronze, Iron Age periods to the Ottoman period
- Cultures: Canaanite, Jewish, Greco-Roman, Byzantine, early Islamic, Ottoman
- Location: Israel
- Region: Shfela
- Grid position: 150/118 PAL

History
- Built: Canaanite period and successive periods
- Abandoned: unknown

Site notes
- Excavation dates: 2015
- Archaeologists: Surveyed by Y. Dagan, B. Zissu, I. Radashkovsky and E. Liraz
- Condition: Ruin
- Owner: Jewish National Fund
- Public access: yes

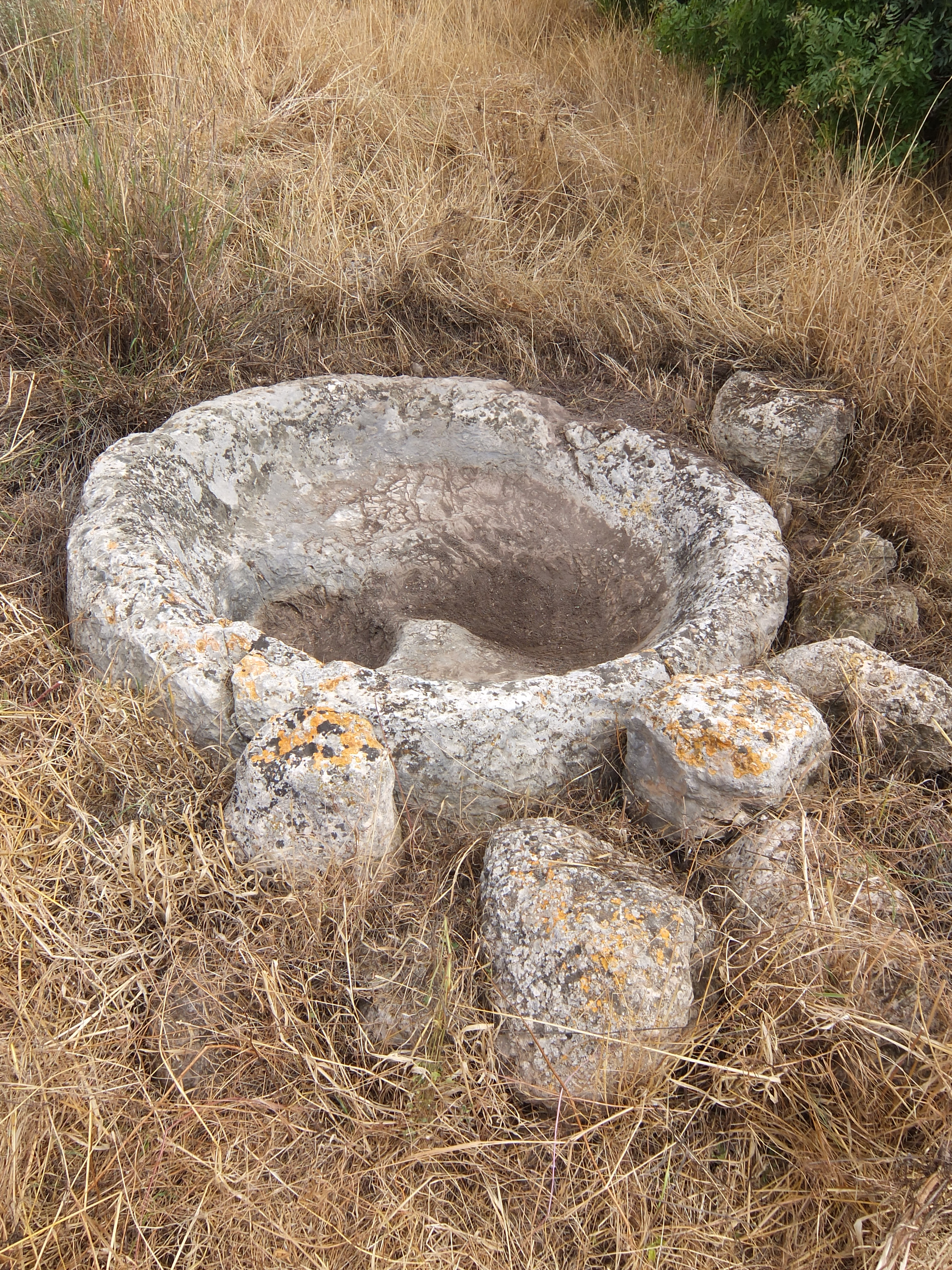
Khirbet 'Eîd el Mieh, stone water trough (at the lower site)

Adullam (Hebrew: עֲדֻלָּם, romanized: ʿĂḏullām, Koine Greek: Οδολλάμ) is an ancient ruin once numbered among the thirty-six cities of Canaan whose kings "Joshua and the children of Israel smote" (Joshua 12:7–24). After that, it fell as an inheritance to the tribe of Judah and was included in the northern division of the Shephelah "lowland" cities of the land of Judah (Joshua 15:35). Adullam is mentioned a number of times in the Hebrew Bible, including events featuring David who took refuge at Adullam, escaping King Saul. At this time Adullam was close to the land of the Philistines.

The current site is also known by the Arabic name Khurbet esh-Sheikh Madhkur, 9 mi. (15 km.) northeast of Bayt Jibrin, and was built upon a hilltop overlooking the Elah valley, straddling the Green Line between Israel and the West Bank, and with its suburban ruin, Levantine Arabic: عيد الميا, romanized: ʿeyd el-Miye, lying directly below it. By the late 19th century, the settlement, which had been a town, was in ruins. The hilltop ruin is named after Madkour, one of the sons of the Sultan Beder, for whom is built a shrine (wely) and formerly called by its inhabitants Wely Madkour.

The hilltop is mostly flat, with cisterns carved into the rock. The remains of stone structures which once stood there can still be seen. Sedimentary layers of ruins from the old Canaanite and Israelite eras, mostly potsherds, are noticeable everywhere, although olive groves now grow atop of this hill, enclosed within stonewall enclosures. The villages of Aderet, Aviezer and Khirbet al-Deir are located nearby. The ruin lies about 3 km (1.9 mi) south of moshav Neve Michael. The site has been surveyed archaeologically and was partially excavated in 2015.

== Main archaeological sites ==
Kh. esh-Sheikh Madkur (Palestine grid: 1503/1175) sits at an elevation of 434 metres (1,424 ft) above sea-level and is thought by modern historical geographers to be the "upper Adullam", based on its proximity to Kh. 'Id el-Minya. The name of this latter site is believed by historical geographers to be a corruption of the word "Adullam." The identification of the upper site with the biblical Adullam is still inconclusive, as archaeological evidence attesting to its Old Canaanite name has yet to be found. In the late 19th century, the hilltop ruin and its adjacent ruins were explored by French explorer, Victor Guérin, who wrote:

[Upon leaving the hilltop ruin, Khirbet el-Sheikh Madkour], at 11:20 [AM], we descend to the east in the valley. At 11:25 [AM], I examine other ruins, called Khirbet A'id el-Miah. Sixty toppled houses in the wadi formed a village that still existed in the Muslim period, as [proven by] the remains of a mosque there observed. In antiquity, the ruins that cover the plateau of the hill of Sheikh Madkour and which extend in the valley were probably one and the same city, divided into two parts, the upper part and the lower part.

While Guérin does not specifically say that the site in question was the ancient Adullam, he holds that Kh. esh-Sheikh Madkour and Kh. 'Id el Minya are to be recognised as the same city; the upper and the lower. The site is maintained by the Jewish National Fund in Israel, and archaeological surveys and partial excavations have been conducted. The site features ancient caverns, cisterns carved into the rock, and a Muslim shrine known as Wely Sheikh Madkour.

Kh. 'Id el Minya, also known as 'Eid al-Miah (Palestine grid: 1504/1181), is the site recognised as Adullam proper, being now a tell at the southern end of Wadi es-Sûr, an extension of the Elah valley. The site was first recognised as the biblical Adullam by French archaeologist Clermont-Ganneau in 1871, based on its location, a close approximation of the name and the ceramic finds it yielded. The ruin sits at an elevation of 351 metres (1,152 ft) above sea-level. The ruin is overgrown with vegetation and trees on the northern flanks of the mountain whereon lies Kh. esh-Sheikh Madkour. Razed stone structures, a stone water trough, and the shaft of a stone column can still be seen there. Palestine Exploration Fund surveyor, C.R. Conder, mentions having seen in ʻAid el-Miyeh an ancient well having stone water-troughs round it.

Earlier attempts at identification have led some to call other cave systems by the name of "Cave of Adullam." Early drawings depicting the so-called "Adullam cave" have tentatively been identified with the cavern of Umm el-Tuweimin, and the cave at Khureitun (named after Chariton the Ascetic), although modern day archaeologists and historical geographers have rejected these early hypotheses as being the Cave of Adullam, and have accepted that ʻAid el-Miyeh is the Adullam of old.

It has been pointed out that Kh. esh-Sheikh Madkour, if indeed it is the biblical Adullam, lies only 7 kilometres (4.3 mi) southwest of Timnah, a site mentioned in Genesis 38, as being visited by Judah when he went up from Adullam to shear his sheep.

== History ==
=== Chalcolithic period ===
Surface finds of late Chalcolithic pottery have been recovered from Tel Adullam and the archaeological site at the foot of the tell. Further evidence of human activity from this period has not been discovered through excavation.

=== Biblical period ===
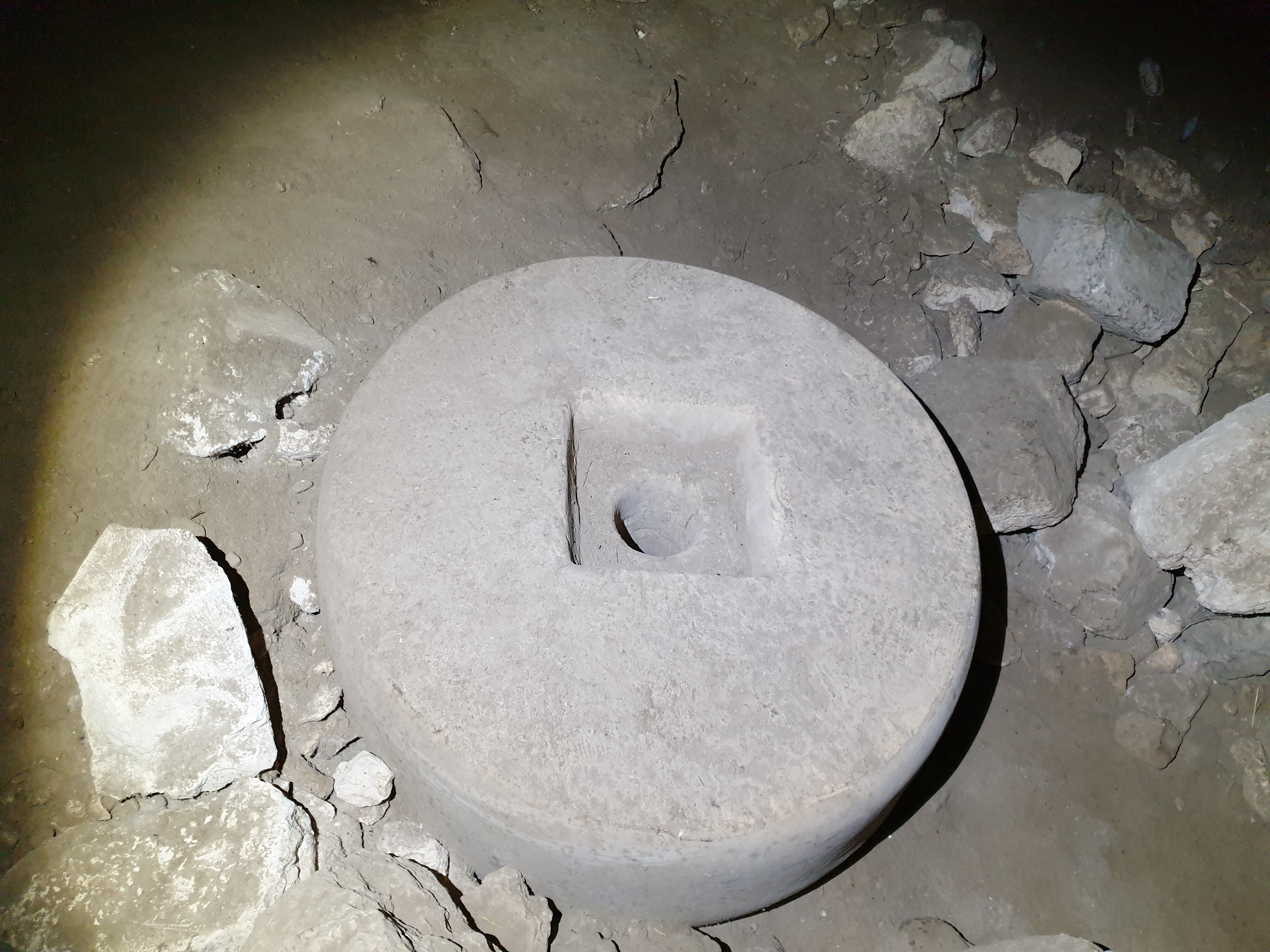
Millstone in an oil press cave

The "Adullam" mentioned in the Hebrew Bible is thought to be identical with Tell Sheikh Madkhur. The so-called "Biblical period", for time reference-sake, has been referred to by historians and archaeologists as the Late Bronze Age and the Iron Age, meaning the Late Canaanite and Israelite periods, respectively. A.F. Rainey recognized Adullam (Kh. esh-Sheikh Madhkûr) as a Late Bronze Age site.

Judah, son of Jacob, split away from his other brothers and met up with an Adullamite called Hirah. In Adullam, Judah met his first wife (unnamed in the Book of Genesis), the daughter of Shuah.

By the Iron Age, Adullam is referred to in the Hebrew Bible as being one of the royal cities of the Canaanites, and is listed along with the cities Jarmuth and Socho as occupying a place in the region geographically known as the Shefelah, or what is a place of transition between the mountainous region and the coastal plains.

During the period of the Israelite conquest of the land of Canaan, Adullam was one of many city-states with independent and sovereign kings. According to the same biblical source, the king of Adullam was slain by Joshua and the Israelites during their conquest of the land. The immediate lands were, by what was thought to be a "divine act" of casting lots, given as a tribal inheritance to the progeny of Judah.

More than 400 years later, the scene of David's victory over Goliath in the Elah valley was within a short distance from Adullam, at that time a frontier village. Although David was elevated and allowed to sit in King Saul's presence, he soon fell into disrepute with the king and was forced to flee.

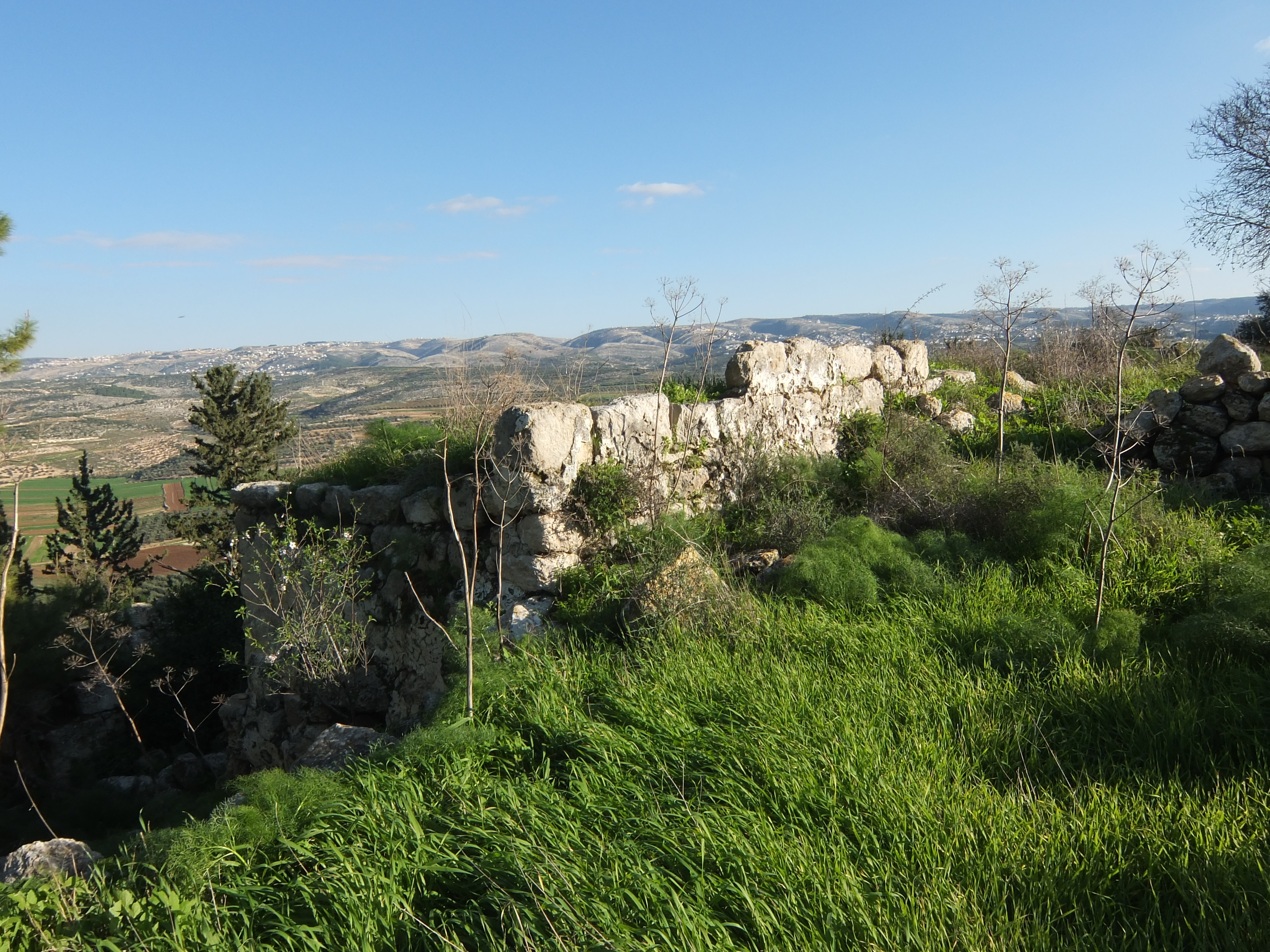
Ruin of Adullam. Wely Madkour

David sought refuge in Adullam after being expelled from the city of Gath by King Achish. The Book of Samuel refers to the Cave of Adullam where he found protection while living as a refugee from King Saul. Certain caves, grottos and sepulchres are still to be seen on the hilltop, as well as on its northern and eastern slopes. It was there that "every one that was in distress gathered together, and every one that was in debt, and every one that was discontented." There, David thirsted for the well-waters of his native Beth-lehem, then occupied by a Philistine garrison. A party of David's mighty-men of valor went and fetched him water from that place, but, when they returned, David refused to drink it.

In the 10th-century BCE, Adullam was thought to have strategic importance, prompting King David's grandson, Rehoboam (c. 931–913 BCE), to fortify the town, among others, against Ancient Egypt. According to Israeli historian Nadav Na'aman, this was not a fortress in the real sense, but only a town inhabited by a civilian population, although it functioned as an administrative military center in which a garrison was stationed and food and armor stored.

=== Assyrian and Chaldean conquests ===
In the late 8th-century BCE, the Book of Micah recalled the cities of the lowlands of Judah during a time of Assyrian encroachment in the country: "I will yet bring unto thee, O inhabitant of Mareshah, him that shall possess thee; he shall come even unto Adullam, O glory of Israel."

Sennacherib, during his third military campaign, despoiled many of the cities belonging to Judah. The Assyrian period was followed by the rise of the Neo-Babylonian Empire, a time marked by general unrest and the eventual deportation of the inhabitants of Judah by the Neo-Babylonian army in the sixth century BCE. Adullam, as with other towns of the region, would not have gone unaffected.

=== Persian period ===
The only record of Adullam for this time-period (c. 539–331 BCE) is taken from the Hebrew canonical books, specifically the account of Nehemiah who returned with the Jewish exiles from the Babylonian captivity, during the reign of Artaxerxes I. According to Ezra, the acclaimed author of the book, some of these returnees had settled in Adullam. According to Nehemiah, the postexilic community that resettled in Adullam traced their lineage to the tribe of Judah.

The political entity that was established in Judea at the time was that of a vassal state, as Judea became a province of the Persian Empire, governed by a satrap.

=== Hellenistic, Roman and Byzantine periods ===
Few records abound for the site during the classical period. In 163 BCE, it was in Adullam that Judas Maccabaeus, the principal leader of the Maccabean Revolt during a time of foreign dominion in the country, retired with his fighting men, after returning from war against the Idumaeans and the Seleucid general, Gorgias. Adullam stood near the highway which later became the Roman road in the Valley of Elah, which road led from Jerusalem to Beit Gubrin.

As late as the early 4th century CE, Adullam was described by Eusebius as being "a very large village about ten [Roman] miles east of Eleutheropolis."

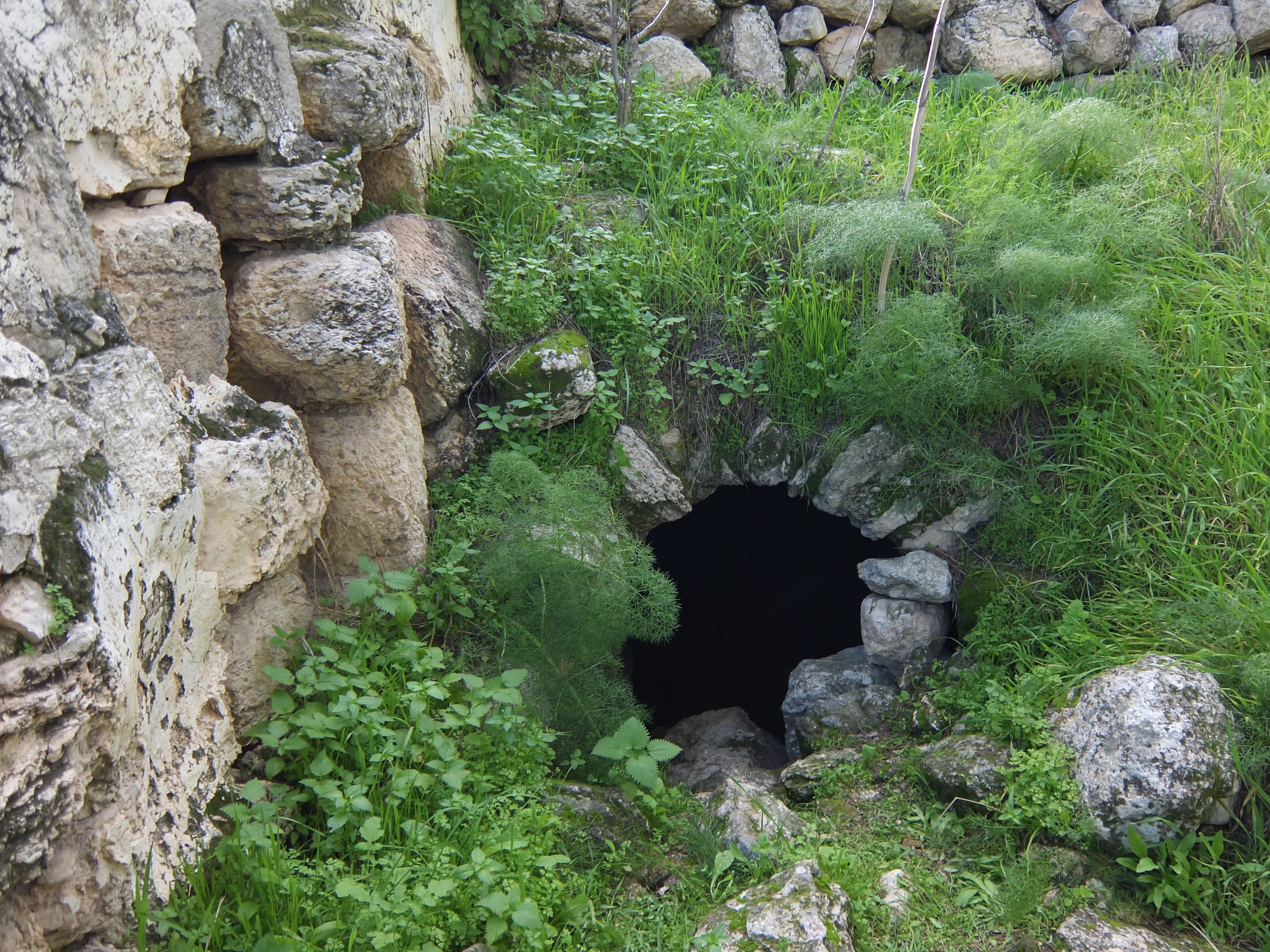
Cave-like structure at the Upper site of Adullam

=== Ottoman period ===
Adullam was an inhabited village in the late 16th century. An Ottoman tax ledger of 1596 lists ʻAyn al-Mayyā [sic] (Arabic: عين الميا) in the nahiya Ḫalīl (Hebron subdistrict), and where it is noted that it had thirty-six Muslim heads of households. The copyist of the same tax ledger had erroneously mistaken the Arabic dal in the document for a nun, and which name has since been corrected by historical geographers Yoel Elitzur and Toledano to read ʻA'ïd el-Miah (Arabic: عيد الميا), based on the entry's number of fiscal unit in the daftar and its corresponding place on Hütteroth's map. Local inhabitants grew wheat and barley, as well as cultivated olives. Total revenues accruing from the village for that year amounted to 5160 akçe.

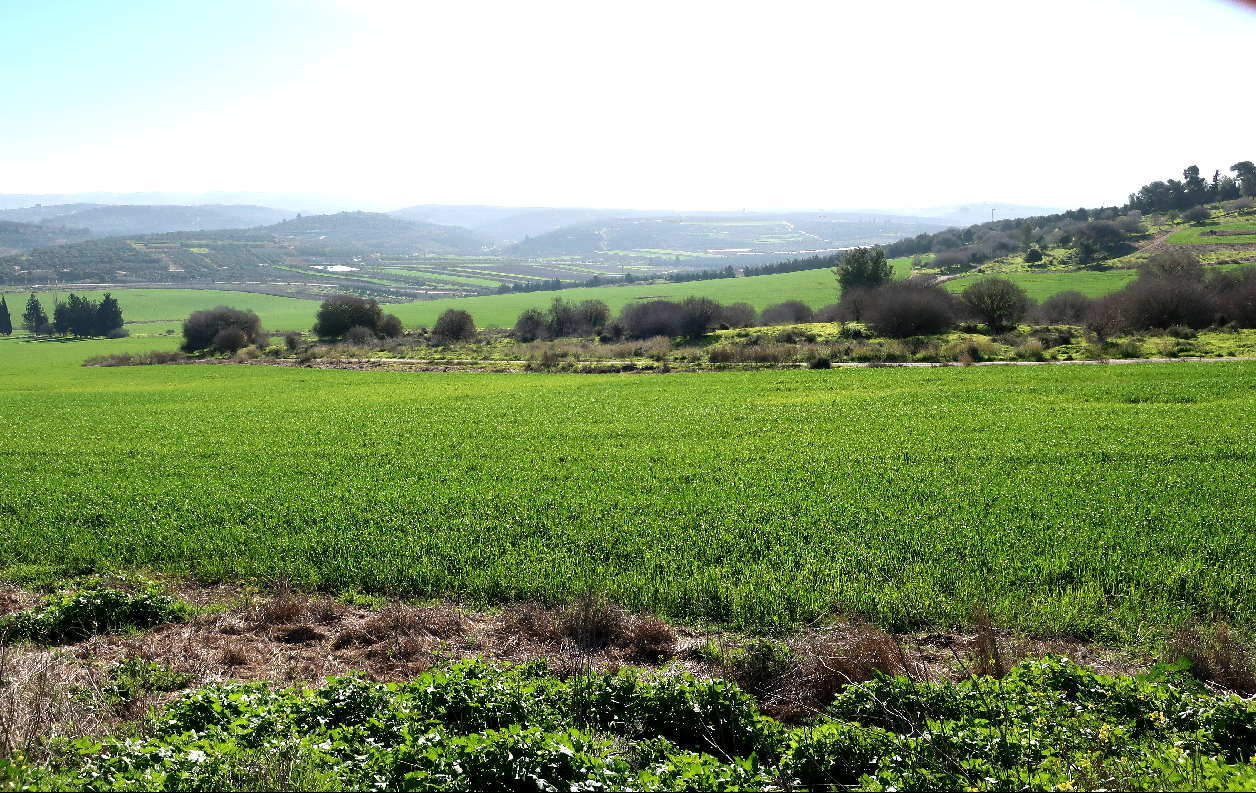
Biblical ruin of Adullam, the Lower site known as ʻAid al-Mieh (in foreground)

According to Conder, an ancient road, leading from Beit Sur to Isdud once passed through ʿAīd el Mâ (Adullam) and was still partially visible.

French orientalist and archaeologist, Charles Clermont-Ganneau, visited the site in 1874 and wrote: "The place is absolutely uninhabited, except during the rainy season, when the herdsmen take shelter there for the night."

The Arabs of Bayt Nattif in the 19th century, when asked about the meaning of the name of the nearby ruin, ʻA'ïd el-Miah, related their own legend about the origin of the name. According to their version, the name ʻA'ïd el-Miah = lit. "Holiday of the Hundred," revolves around an event that occurred there, years ago. According to their story, a large fight broke out on a holiday, in which a hundred people were killed and the settlement destroyed. In memory of the event, the ruins of the settlement were named ʻA'ïd el-Miah, which means "Holiday of the Hundred." Scholars explain this as a case of 'popular etymology', where, in Palestinian toponyms, the original denotation of a town's name is often "re-interpreted" by its local population.

== Modern period ==
In 1957, the establishment of the Adullam region (Hebrew: חבל עדולם) began, a settlement area comprising over 100,000 dunams (25,000 acres), and bearing the name of the biblical city. Near the mound, north of it, Moshav Aderet was established in 1958.

Surveys were conducted on the site in the years 1992 and 1999. As late as 2003, the archaeological site of Adullam, both, Upper and Lower, had not been excavated, but by September 2015, an excavation to a depth of 0.2 m in six squares of equal size was conducted in the surface of the Upper ruin, in hopes of determining the extent of the settlement at the site during the various periods from the relative distribution of the pottery. The gathered pottery sherds found in situ dated from the Early Bronze Age to the Ottoman period.

== Bibliography ==
- Abel, F-M. (1924). "Adullam". Revue Biblique (in French). Paris: 206.
- Abel, F.M. (1933). Géographie de la Palestine. Études bibliques (in French). Vol. 1–2. Paris: Gabalda. (volume 2, 1938)
- Aharoni, Y. (1979). The Land of the Bible: A Historical Geography (2 ed.). Philadelphia: Westminster Press. ISBN 0-664-24266-9. OCLC 6250553. (original Hebrew edition: 'Land of Israel in Biblical Times - Historical Geography', Bialik Institute, Jerusalem (1962))
- Amit, David [in Hebrew] (n.d.). "Tel Adullam". In Ben-Yosef, Sefi (ed.). Israel Guide - Judaea (A useful encyclopedia for the knowledge of the country) (in Hebrew). Vol. 9. Jerusalem: Keter Publishing House. OCLC 745203905.
- Avi-Yonah, Michael (1973) [1971]. "Adullam". Encyclopaedia Judaica. Vol. 2 (A–ANG) (reprint ed.). Jerusalem: Keter Publishing House. p. 312.
- Avi-Yonah, M. (1976). "Gazetteer of Roman Palestine". Qedem. 5. The Institute of Archaeology at the Hebrew University of Jerusalem; Carta: 3–112. JSTOR 43587090.
- Ben-Yosef, Sefi [in Hebrew], ed. (n.d.). Israel Guide - Judaea (A useful encyclopedia for the knowledge of the country) (in Hebrew). Vol. 9. Jerusalem: Keter Publishing House. OCLC 745203905.
- Beyer, Gustav (1931). "Beiträge zur Territorialgeschicte von Südwestpalästinas im Altertum (Das Festungssystem Rehabeams)". Zeitschrift des Deutschen Palästina-Vereins (in German). 54 (3). Deutscher verein zur Erforschung Palästinas. JSTOR 27929938.
- Chapmann III, R.L.; Taylor, J.E., eds. (2003). Palestine in the Fourth Century A.D.: The Onomasticon by Eusebius of Caesarea. Translated by G.S.P. Freeman-Grenville. Jerusalem: Carta. ISBN 965-220-500-1. OCLC 937002750.
- Clermont-Ganneau, C. (1875). "The Site of the City of Adullam" (PDF). Palestine Exploration Fund Quarterly Statement. 7 (3 (July)): 168–177. doi:10.1179/peq.1875.016.
- Clermont-Ganneau, C. (1896). Archaeological Researches in Palestine During the Years 1873–1874. Vol. 2. London: The Committee of the Palestine Exploration Fund. OCLC 3297101.
- Conder, C.R. (1879). Tent Work in Palestine. A Record of Discovery and Adventure. Vol. 2. London: Richard Bentley & Son (published for the Committee of the PEF). OCLC 23589738.
- Conder, C.R.; Kitchener, H. H. (1882). The Survey of Western Palestine: Memoirs of the Topography, Orography, Hydrography, and Archaeology. Vol. 2. London: Committee of the Palestine Exploration Fund.
- Conder, C.R.; Kitchener, H.H. (1883). The Survey of Western Palestine: Memoirs of the Topography, Orography, Hydrography, and Archaeology. Vol. 3. London: Committee of the Palestine Exploration Fund.
- Elitzur, Yoel [in Hebrew] (2004). Ancient Place Names in the Holy Land - Preservation and History. Eisenbrauns. ISBN 1-57506-071-X.
- Emerton, J.A. (1975). "Some Problems in Genesis XXXVIII". Vetus Testamentum. 25 (2): 338–361. doi:10.2307/1516950. JSTOR 1516950.
- Faust, A. (2012). Judah in the Neo-Babylonian Period: The Archaeology of Desolation. Society of Biblical Lit. ISBN 978-1-58983-641-9.
- Garfinkel, Yosef (2023), "The Late Chalcolithic in the Valley of Elah, Israel", in Ben-Yosef, Erez; Jones, Ian W. N. (eds.), “And in Length of Days Understanding” (Job 12:12): Essays in Archaeology in the Eastern Mediterranean and Beyond in Honor of Thomas E. Levy, Cham: Springer International Publishing, pp. 245–265, doi:10.1007/978-3-031-27330-8_12, ISBN 978-3-031-27329-2
- Guérin, Victor (1869). Description Géographique Historique et Archéologique de la Palestine (in French). Vol. 1: Judee, pt. 3. Paris: L'Imprimerie Nationale.
- Hütteroth, W.-D.; Abdulfattah, K. (1977). Historical Geography of Palestine, Transjordan and Southern Syria in the Late 16th Century. Erlanger Geographische Arbeiten, Sonderband 5. Erlangen, Germany: Vorstand der Fränkischen Geographischen Gesellschaft. ISBN 3-920405-41-2.
- Laato, Antti (1995). "Assyrian Propaganda and the Falsification of History in the Royal Inscriptions of Sennacherib". Vetus Testamentum. 45 (2). Brill: 198–226. doi:10.1163/1568533952581324. JSTOR 1535132.
- Naʾaman, Nadav (1986). "Hezekiah's Fortified Cities and the "LMLK" Stamps". Bulletin of the American Schools of Oriental Research. 261 (261): 5–21. doi:10.2307/1357061. JSTOR 1357061. S2CID 222435471.
- Notley, R.S.; Safrai, Z., eds. (2005). Eusebius, Onomasticon: The Place Names of Divine Scripture. Boston / Leiden: E.J. Brill. ISBN 0-391-04217-3. OCLC 927381934.
- Radashkovsky, Igal; Liraz, Elad (2017). "Khirbat esh-Sheikh Madkur (west)". Hadashot Arkheologiyot: Excavations and Surveys in Israel / חדשות ארכיאולוגיות: חפירות וסקרים בישראל. 129 (129). Hadashot Arkheologiyot – Excavations and Surveys in Israel. JSTOR 26693784.
- Rainey, A.F. (1983). "The Biblical Shephelah of Judah". Bulletin of the American Schools of Oriental Research. 251 (251). The University of Chicago Press on behalf of The American Schools of Oriental Research: 1–22. doi:10.2307/1356823. JSTOR 1356823. S2CID 163604987.
- Shaw, Charles S. (1993). The Speeches of Micah: A Rhetorical-Historical Analysis. Bloomsbury Publishing. ISBN 978-0-567-21443-0.
- Sion, Ofer (2008-05-29). "Khirbat esh-Sheikh Madkur". Hadashot Arkheologiyot – Excavations and Surveys in Israel (120).
- Toledano, E. (1984). "The Sanjaq of Jerusalem in the Sixteenth Century: Aspects of Topography and Population". Archivum Ottomanicum. 9: 279–319. Archived from the original on 2016-03-05.
- Tsafrir, Y.; Di Segni, Leah; Green, Judith (1994). (TIR): Tabula Imperii Romani. Iudaea, Palestina: Eretz Israel in the Hellenistic, Roman and Byzantine Periods; Maps and Gazetteer. Jerusalem: Israel Academy of Sciences and Humanities. ISBN 965-208-107-8.
- Zadok, Ran [in Hebrew] (1995–1997). "A Preliminary Analysis of Ancient Survivals of Modern Palestinian Toponymy". Mediterranean Language Review. 9. Harrassowitz Verlag: 93–171. JSTOR 10.13173/medilangrevi.9.1997.0093.
