= Aderet, Israel =

Moshav in central Israel

Aderet: אַדֶּרֶת (Hebrew); أديريت (Arabic)

Hebrew transcription(s)
  - Official: Adderet
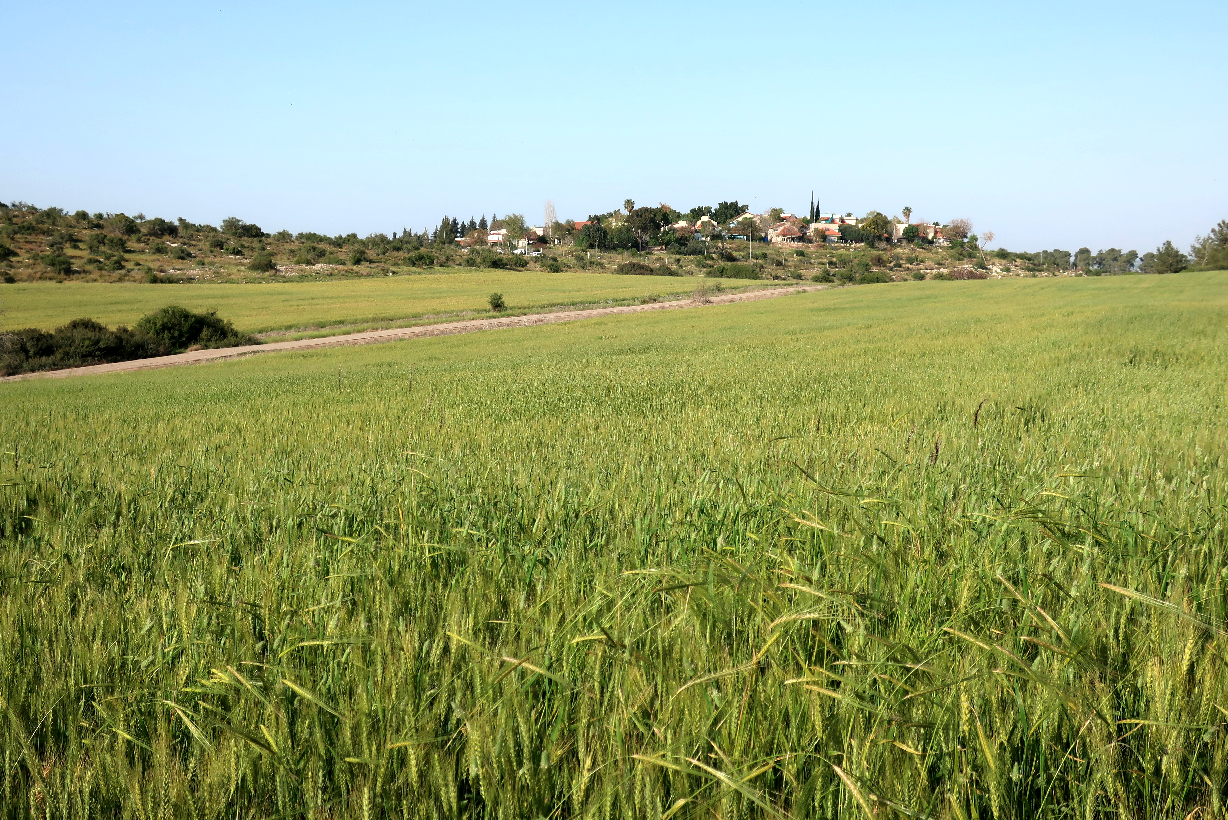
- Wheat fields outside of Moshav Aderet
- Etymology: Glorious (Vine)
- Location within Jerusalem District
- Coordinates: 31°39′37″N 34°59′43″E
- Country: Israel
- District: Jerusalem
- Council: Mateh Yehuda
- Affiliation: Moshavim Movement
- Founded: 1961
- Founder: Moroccan Jews

Government
  - Mayor: Motti Gabbai
- Population (2024): 1,095

Aderet (Hebrew: אַדֶּרֶת) is a moshav in central Israel. Located in the Judean foothills in the Adullam region, south of Beit Shemesh, west of Gush Etzion and overlooking the Valley of Elah, it falls under the jurisdiction of Mateh Yehuda Regional Council. In 2024 it had a population of 1,095.

== History ==
The moshav was founded in the early 1959 by Jewish immigrants from Romania. All of the initial settlers, however, left the site. In 1963, the government re-established the town and brought in Jewish immigrants from the Atlas Mountains in Morocco. Its name was taken from Book of Ezekiel 17:8, meaning "mighty" in the phrase "mighty vine", a symbol of reborn Israel. The name recalls the viticulture in the area.

The residents were involved in poultry farming and other agricultural activities until the late 1980s, when the village evolved into a dormitory community for Jerusalem (40 km) and Tel Aviv (65 km). In 1997 a new neighborhood was built, bringing the population to over 110 families. An additional building project started in late 2006 for seventy plots.

== Education ==
There are two kindergartens in the moshav. School-age children are bused outside the community primarily to either Alon Shvut or Rosh Tzurim. A mechina (pre-military preparatory), open to both religious and non-religious students, was founded after the year 2000. There are four synagogues in Aderet, and the chief rabbi is Moshe Dadon.

== Tourism ==
In the vicinity of Aderet are a vineyard and several archeological sites from the Roman and Byzantine eras in Adullam Grove Nature Reserve, including Horvat 'Ethri and Khirbet Midras from the period of the Bar Kokhba revolt. The cave of Adullam, famous as a refuge for David during his period of flight from King Saul, is 1 km south of Aderet, and the ancient site of Sokho, now famous for its annual flowering of lupines, is 2 km north.

== Gallery ==
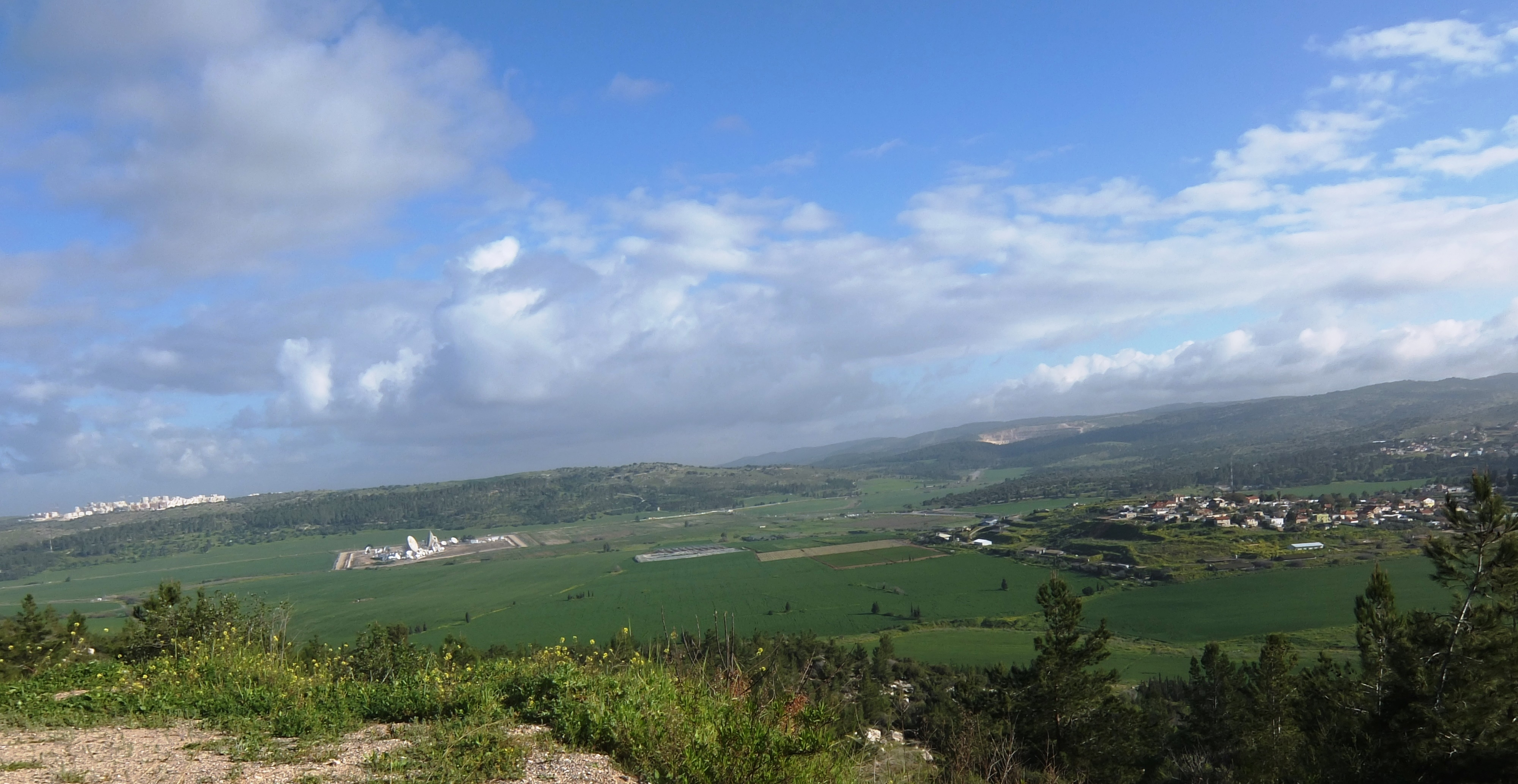
Panoramic view of Elah Valley as seen from atop Moshav Aderet

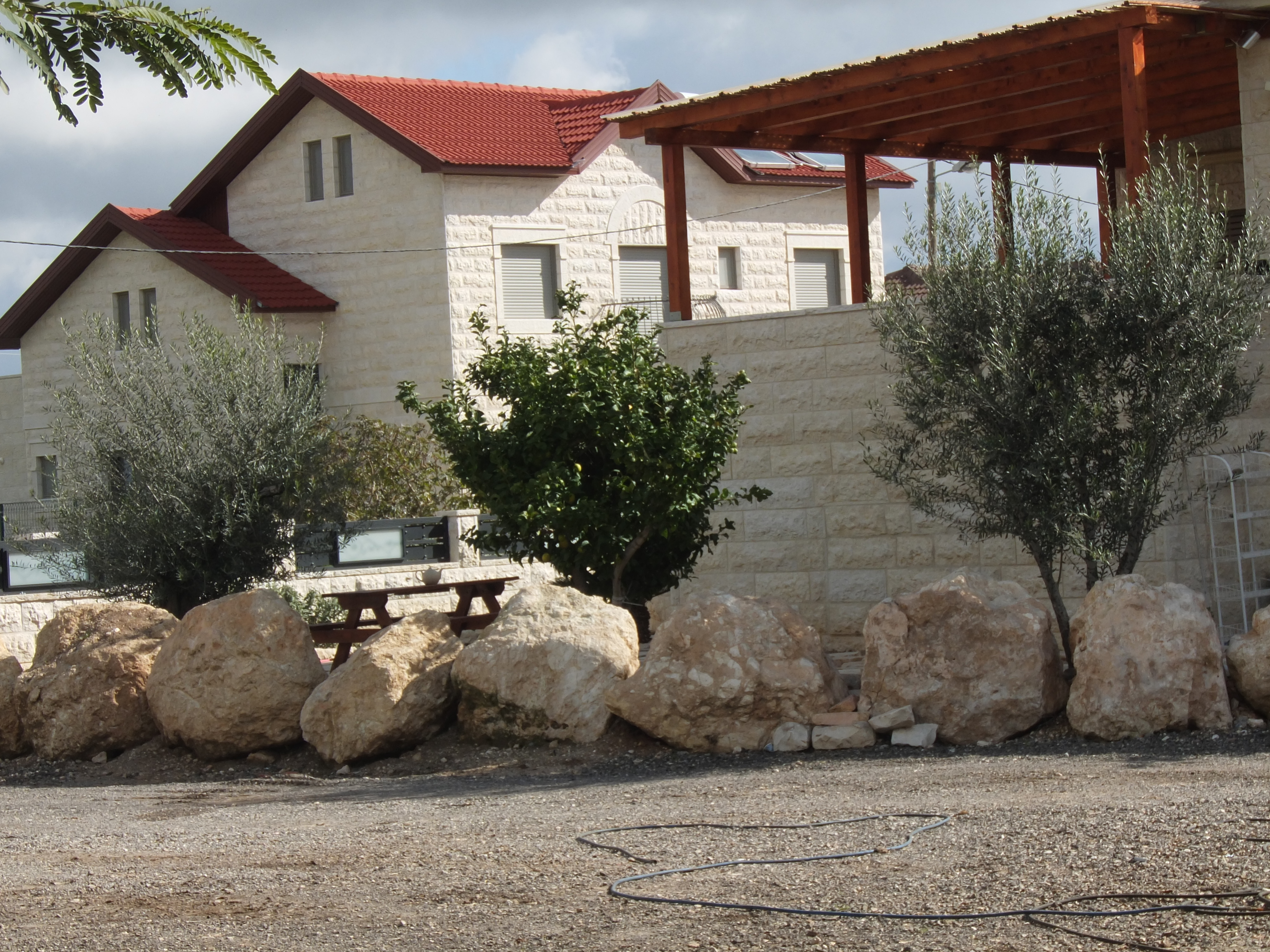
Houses in Aderet

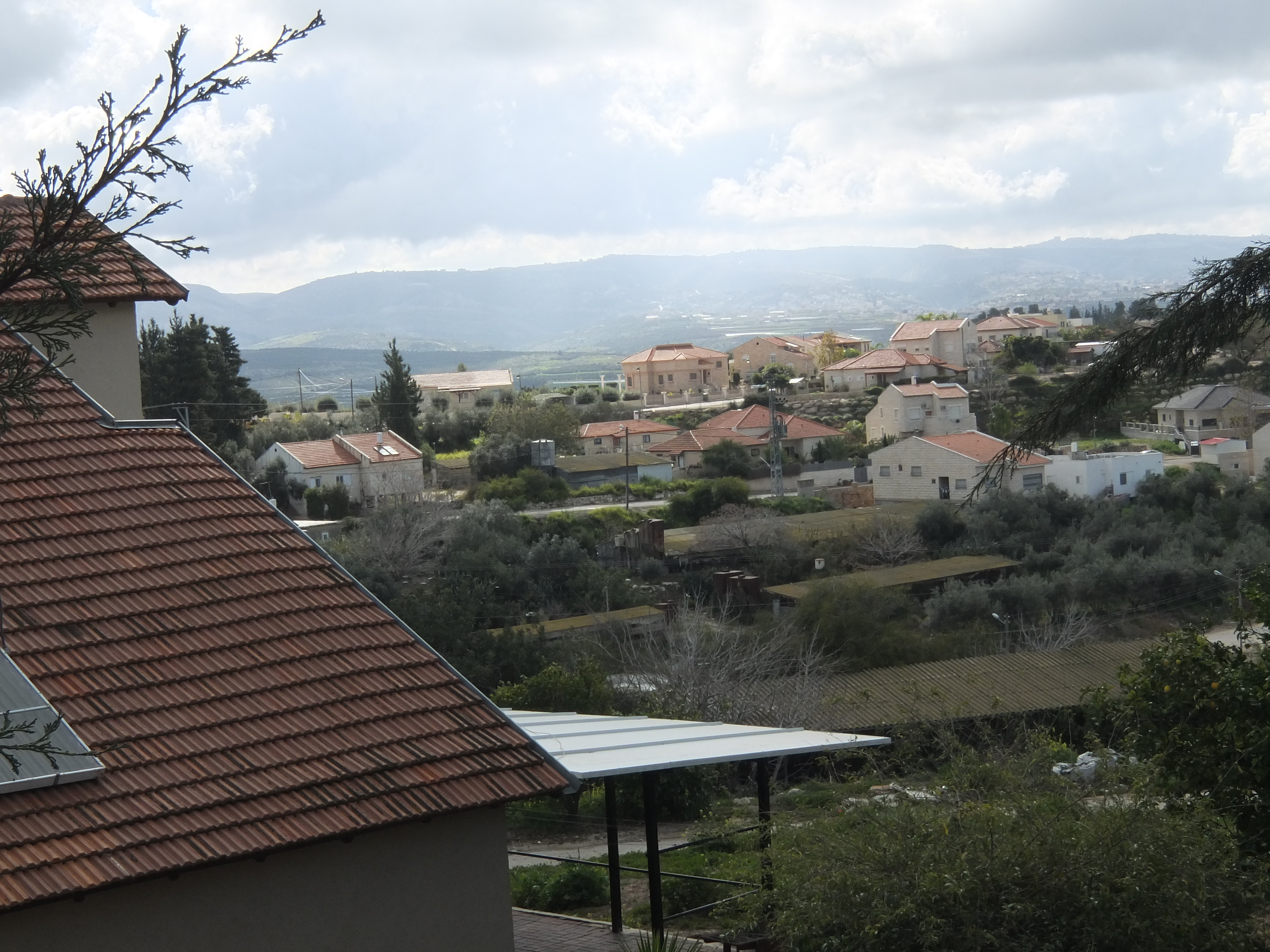
General view of Aderet

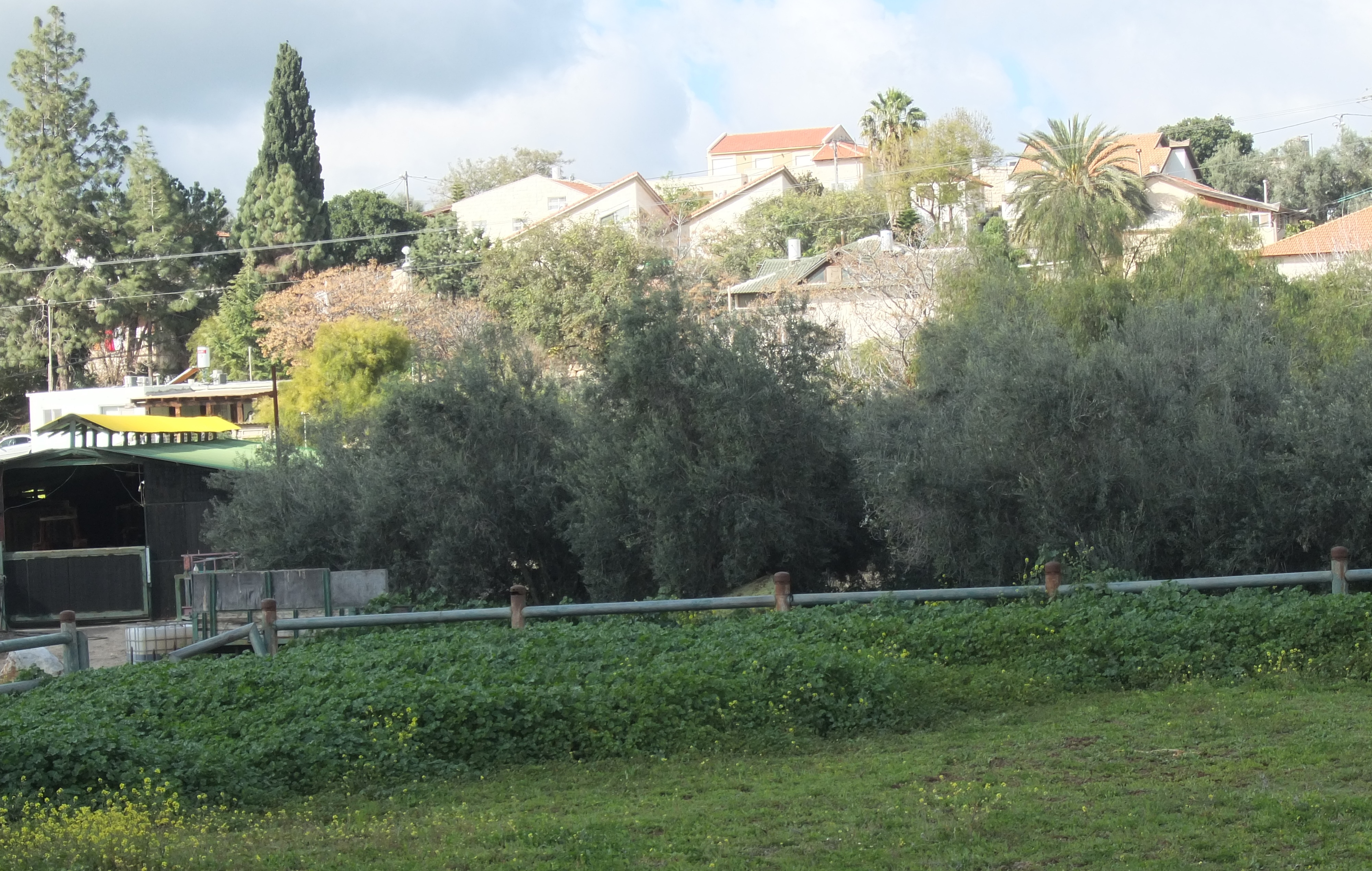
Houses and gardens in Aderet

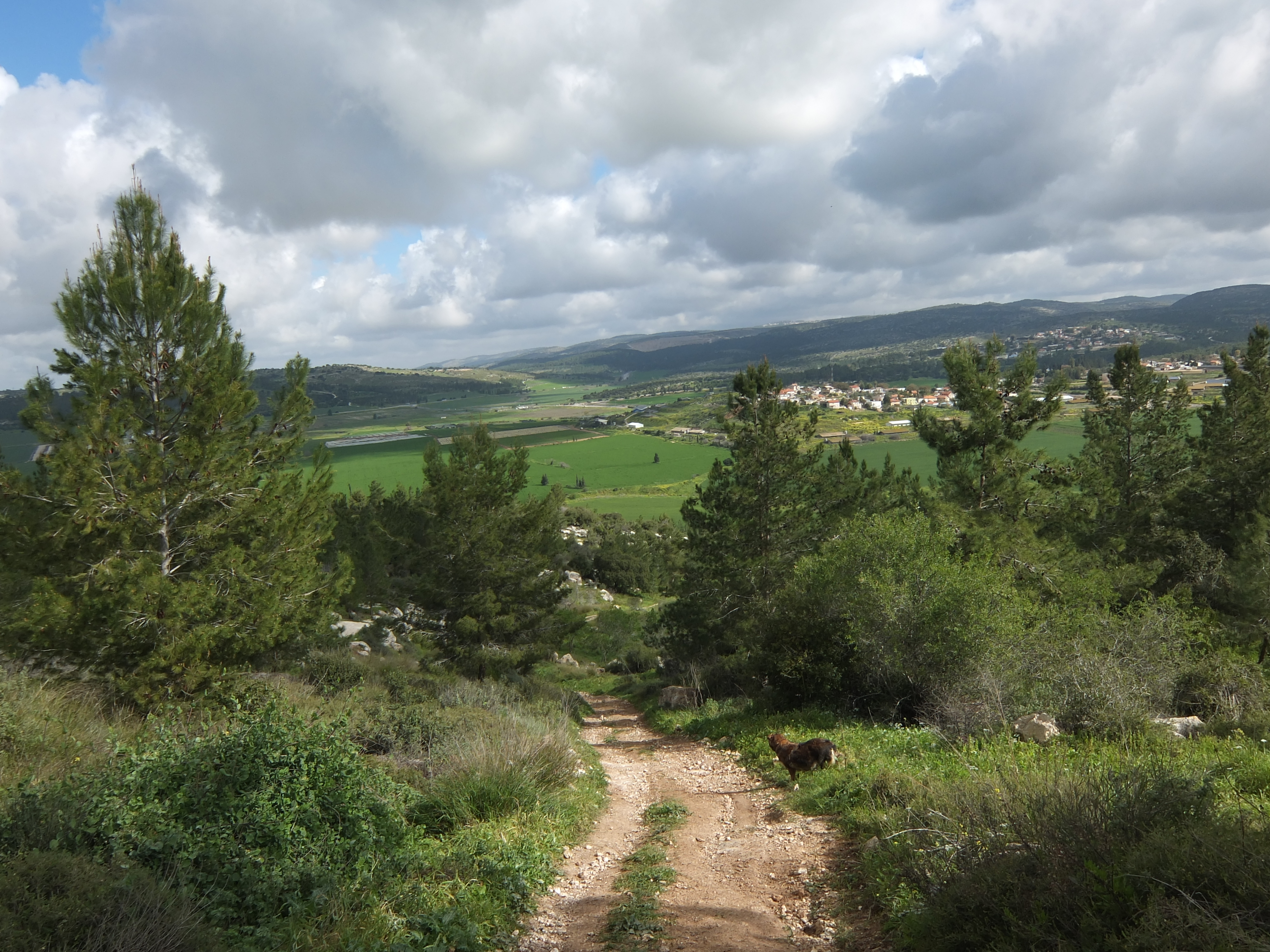
Country road near Aderet

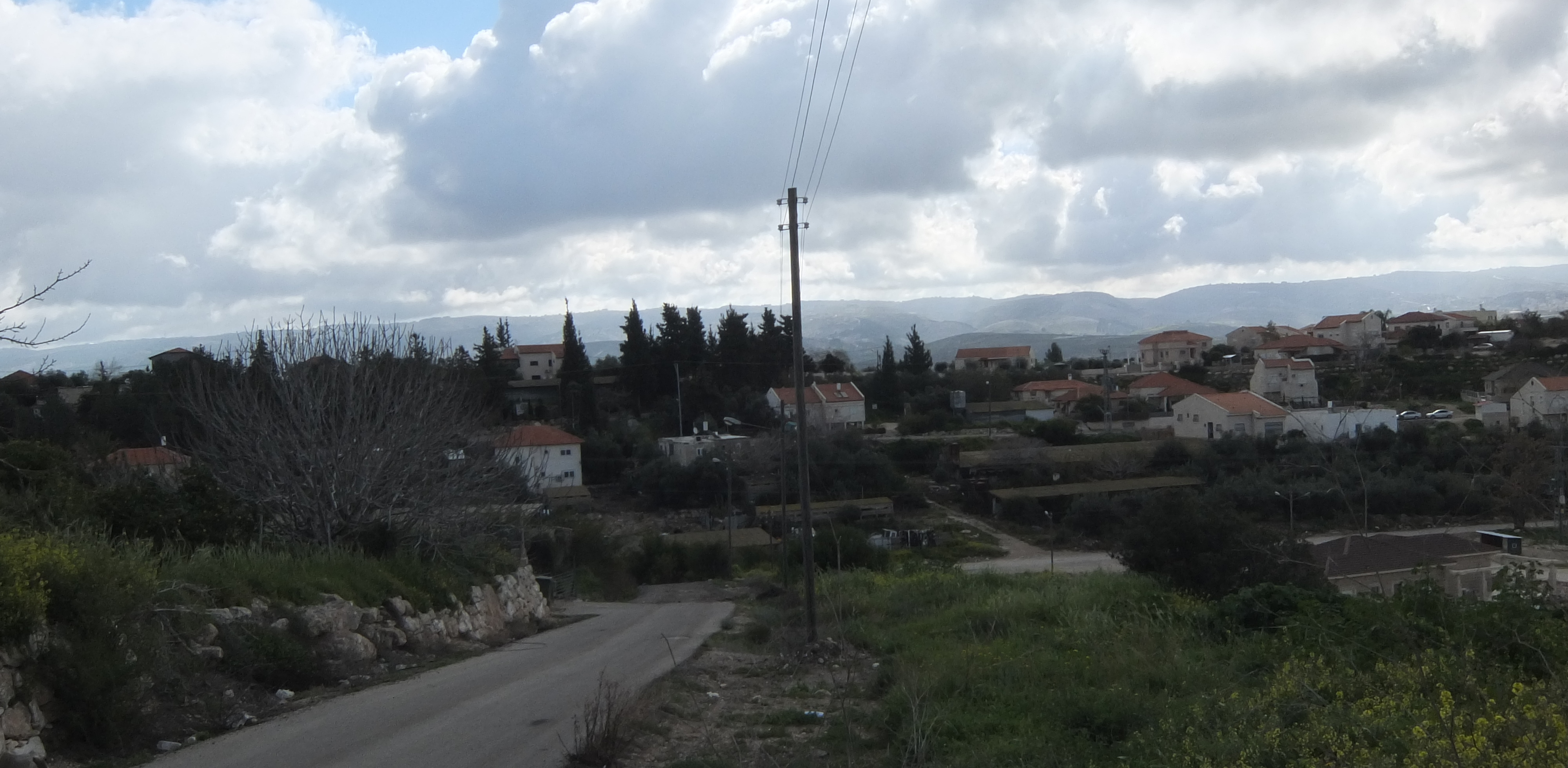
Aderet
