= Valley of Elah =

Geographical place mentioned in the Bible

Coordinates: 31°41′25.10″N 34°57′07.70″E

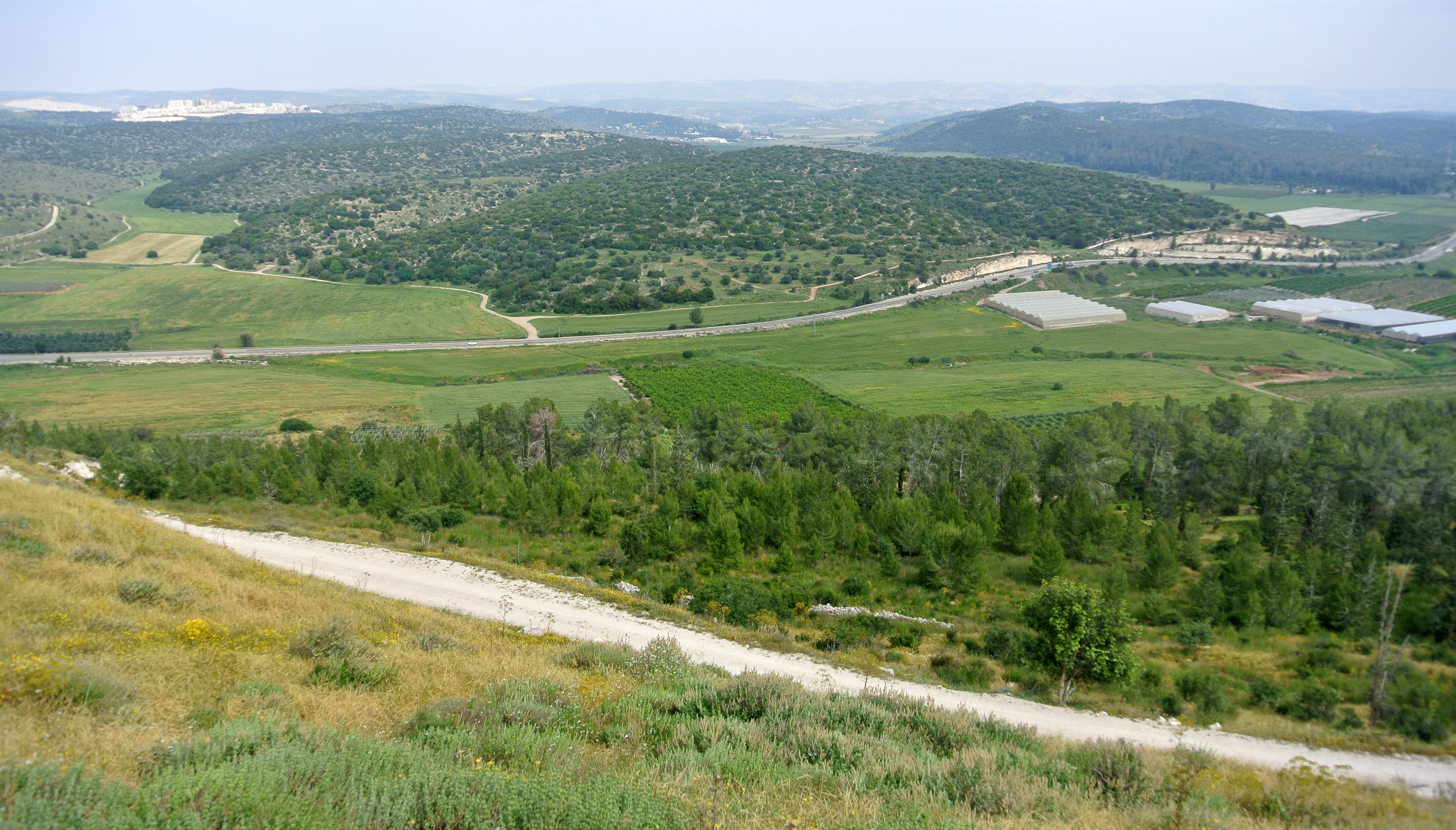
Valley of Elah viewed from the top of Tel Azekah

The Valley of Elah, Ella Valley ("Valley of the terebinth"; from the Hebrew: עמק האלה, romanized: Emeq HaElah), or Wadi es-Sunt (Arabic: وادي السنط), is a long, shallow valley in the Shephelah area of Israel. It is best known from the Hebrew Bible incident where David defeated Goliath (1 Samuel 17:2 and 19). It is home to several important archaeological sites, including those identified as the ancient towns of Azekah and Sokho (1 Samuel 17:1). Rising from the valley on its extreme southeast end lies the hilltop ruin Adullam, and on its north lie the ruins of the ancient fortress city of Khirbet Qeiyafa, which is identified with the ancient town of Shaaraim mentioned in 1 Samuel 17:52.

The valley is named after its indigenous trees: in Hebrew after the large and shady terebinth trees (Pistacia terebinthus and P. palaestina), and in Arabic for the white acacia trees (Faidherbia). On the west side of the valley, near Socho, there is a huge and ancient terebinth, 55 feet (17 m) in height with a trunk 17 feet (5.2 m) in circumference and a canopy at least 75 feet (23 m) in diameter. This tree is notable for being one of the largest terebinths in the area, and marks the valley's upper end.

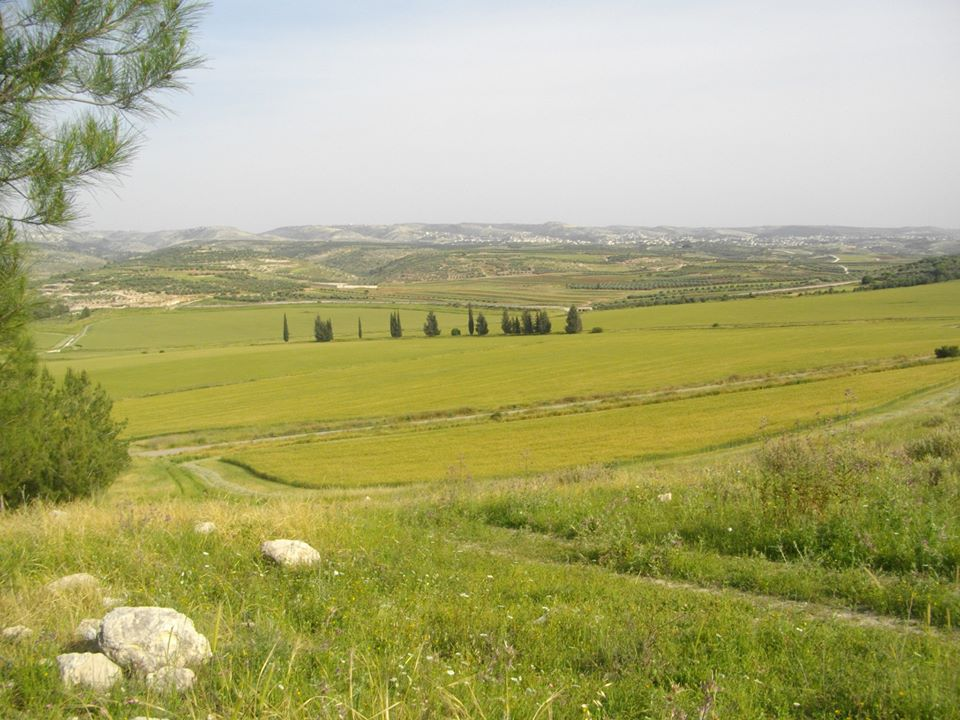
Extension of Elah Valley on its southeastern side, Wadi es-Sur

Since the early 1970s, the valley has also contained a large satellite relay station, with an antenna farm containing some 120 satellite dishes of various sizes. From 2010 to 2014, the region around the valley was believed to be threatened by shale oil extraction through the CCR ground-heating process, with the Green Zionist Alliance (now Aytzim) and the grassroots group Save Adullam, among others, working to stop exploitation of the region. The plan was ultimately blocked in 2014 by a zoning committee decision. In July 2019, the Elah Valley came under the Israel Nature and Parks Authority, owing mainly to its historical importance and the desire to curtail the encroaching city limits of Beit Shemesh to its north.

== History ==
In 2009, Professor Yosef Garfinkel discovered a fortified city from the Iron Age II dated sometime between 1050 and 915 BC at Khirbet Qeiyafa, southwest of Jerusalem in the Elah Valley. The fortifications have been said to support the biblical account of the United Monarchy, the theory that Israel in the time of King David at the beginning of Iron Age II was more than simply a tribal chiefdom. Others are skeptical and suggest it might represent either a Judahite or Canaanite fortress.

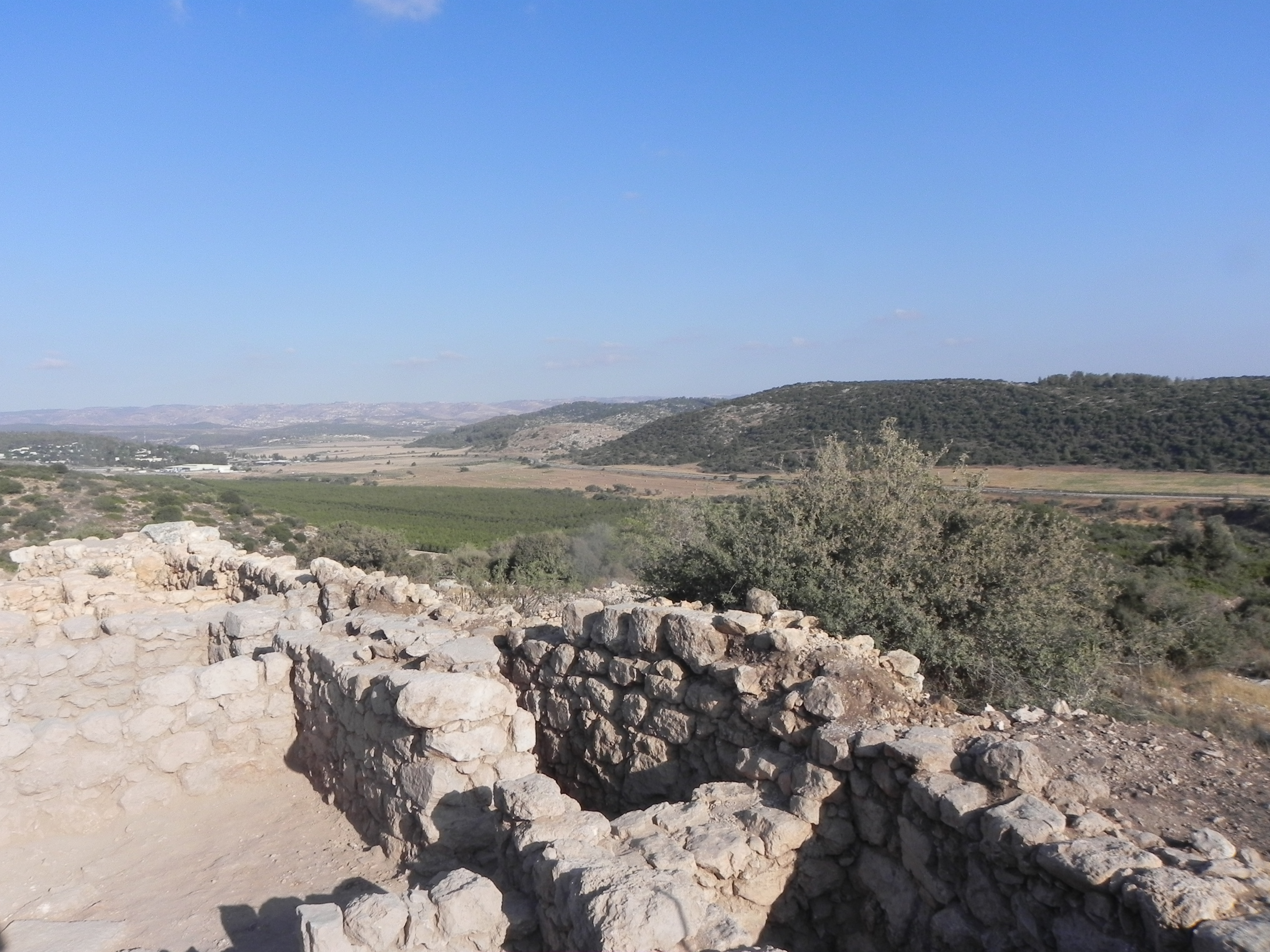
Khirbet Qeiyafa overlooking the Elah Valley

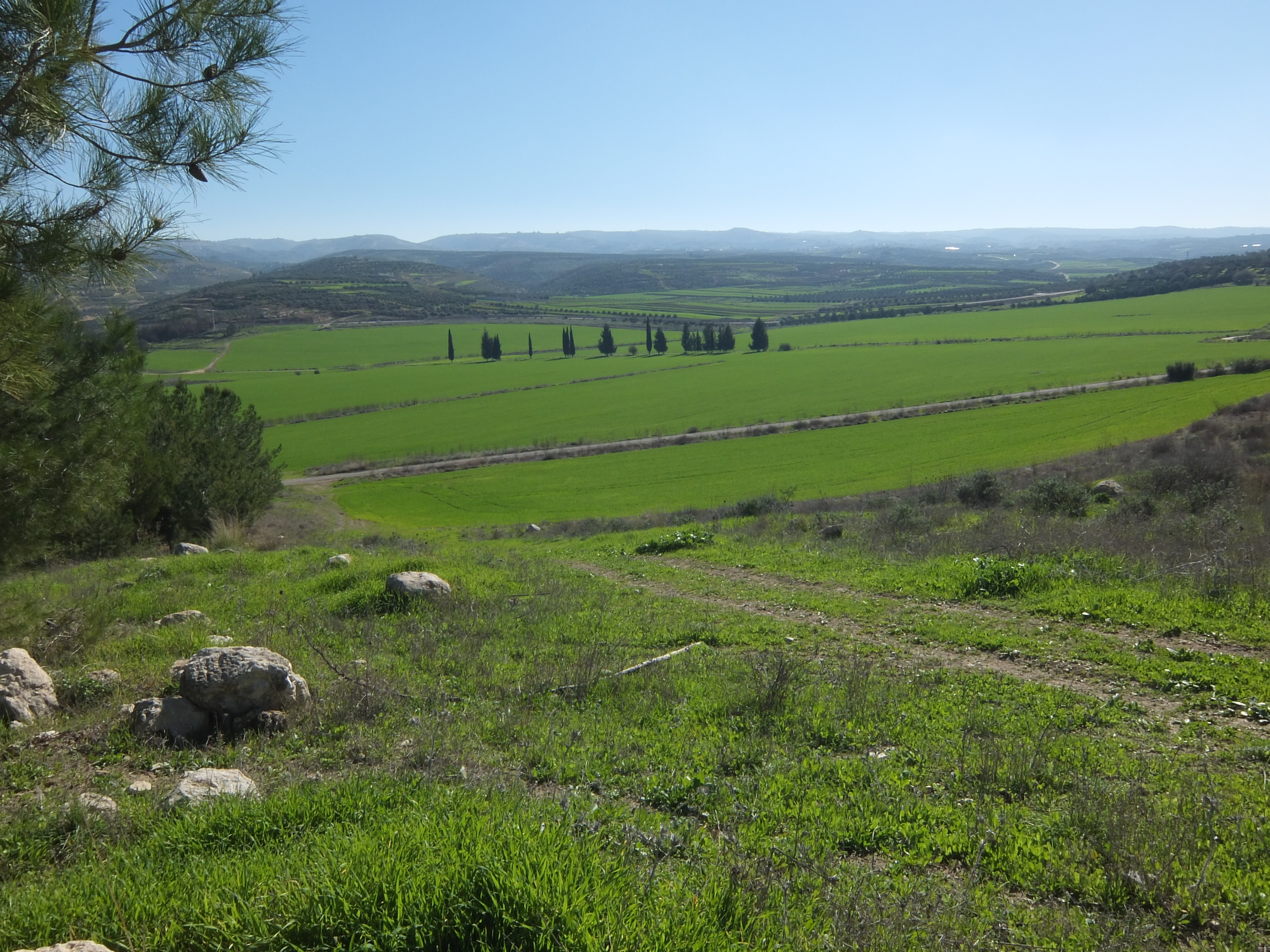
The Valley of Elah after the winter rains, Wadi es Sur

In the late 19th century, Claude Conder and Herbert Kitchener described the Elah Valley as being "one of the most fertile districts in Palestine. It is an open flat vale about half a mile across, and covered with corn; a narrow trench runs down the center full of white pebbles worn by the water in winter. Here and there large terebinths grow along its course (Butmet Wâdy es Sûr), and solitary oak trees (Ballûtet Kŭssis). On either side rise the stony hills covered with brushwood and wild growth."

== Flora and fauna ==
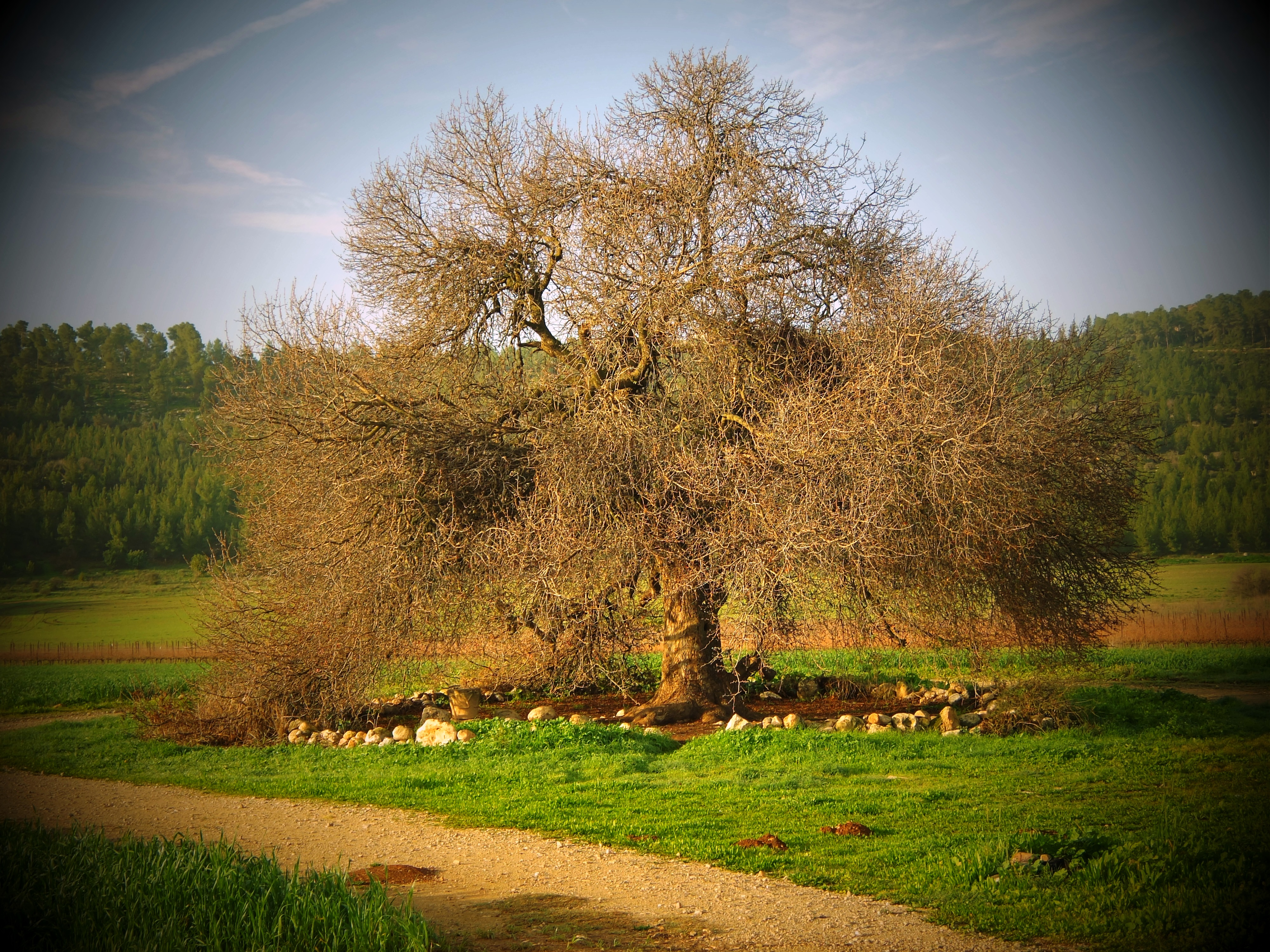
Terebinth (Pistacia atlantica) growing in the Elah Valley

Numerous plant species are native to the Elah Valley, including:

- Terebinth (Pistacia terebinthus)
- Kermes oak (Quercus coccifera)
- Buckthorn (Rhamnus lycioides)
- Carob (Ceratonia siliqua)
- Sweet marjoram (Origanum syriacum)
- Sage (Salvia fruticosa)
- Khella (Visnaga daucoides)
- Fennel (Foeniculum vulgare)
- Anemone (Anemone coronaria)
- Cyclamen (Cyclamen persicum)
- Lupine (Lupinus pilosus)
- Daisy (Glebionis coronaria)
- Syrian cornflower-thistle (Centaurea cyanoides, rare)
- Mallow (Malva nicaeensis)
- Asparagus (Asparagus palaestinus Baker)
- Chicory (Cichorium pumilum; syn. Cichorium endivia)
- Broom lettuce (Lactuca serriola)
- Stinging nettle (Urtica urens)
- Asphodel (Asphodelus aestivus)
- Wild oat (Avena sterilis)
- Wild barley (Hordeum spontaneum; syn. H. ithaburense)
- White mustard (Sinapis alba)
- Arum; cuckoo-pint (Arum palaestinum)
- Caper (Capparis spinosa)
- Wild carrot (Daucus carota)
- Globe-thistle (Echinops adenocaulos)
- Ciliate vetchling (Lathyrus blepharicarpus)
- Spiny broom (Calicotome villosa)
- White acacia (Faidherbia)

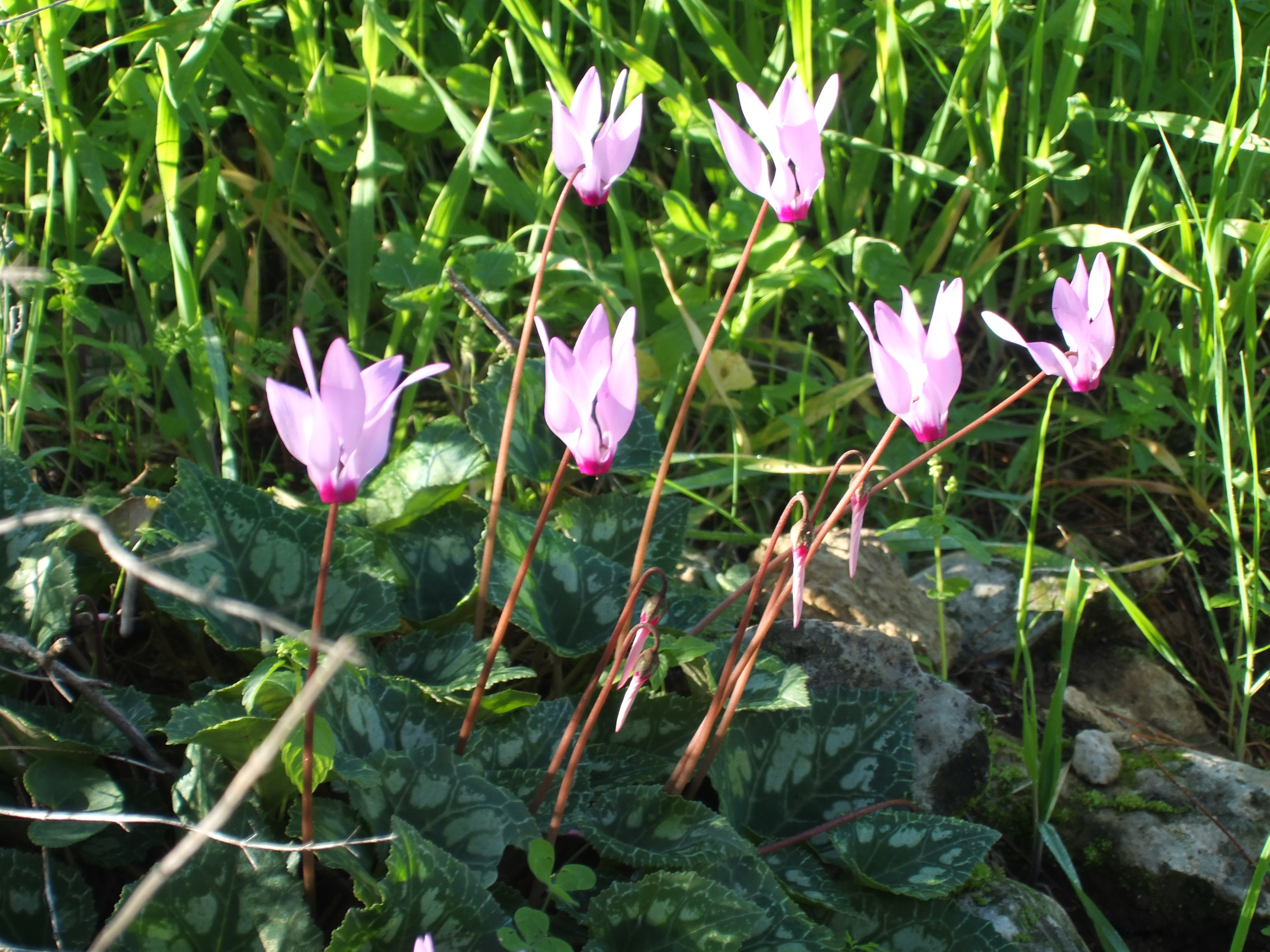
Cyclamen (Cyclamen persicum)

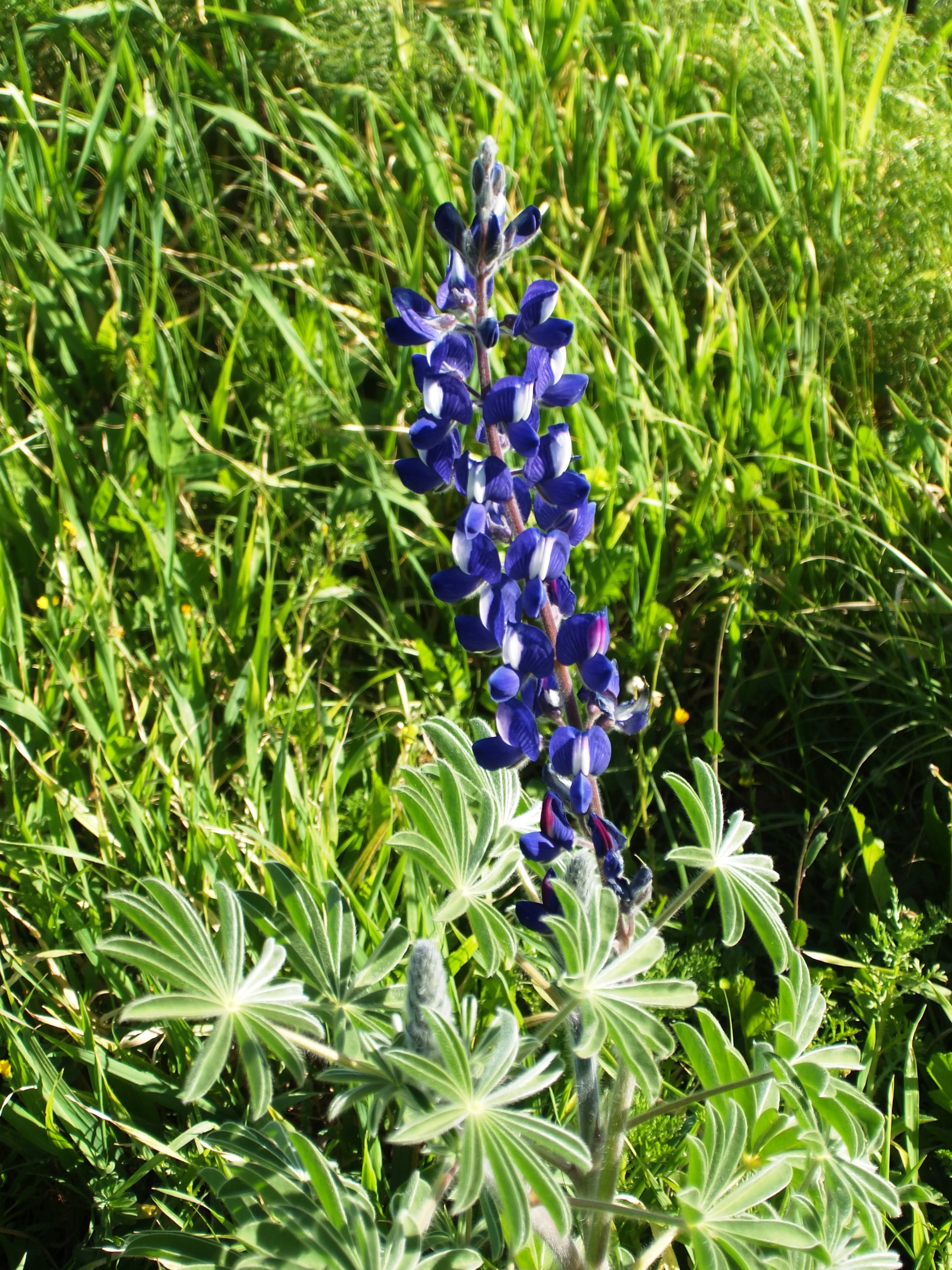
Blue lupine in Tel Socho of the Elah Valley

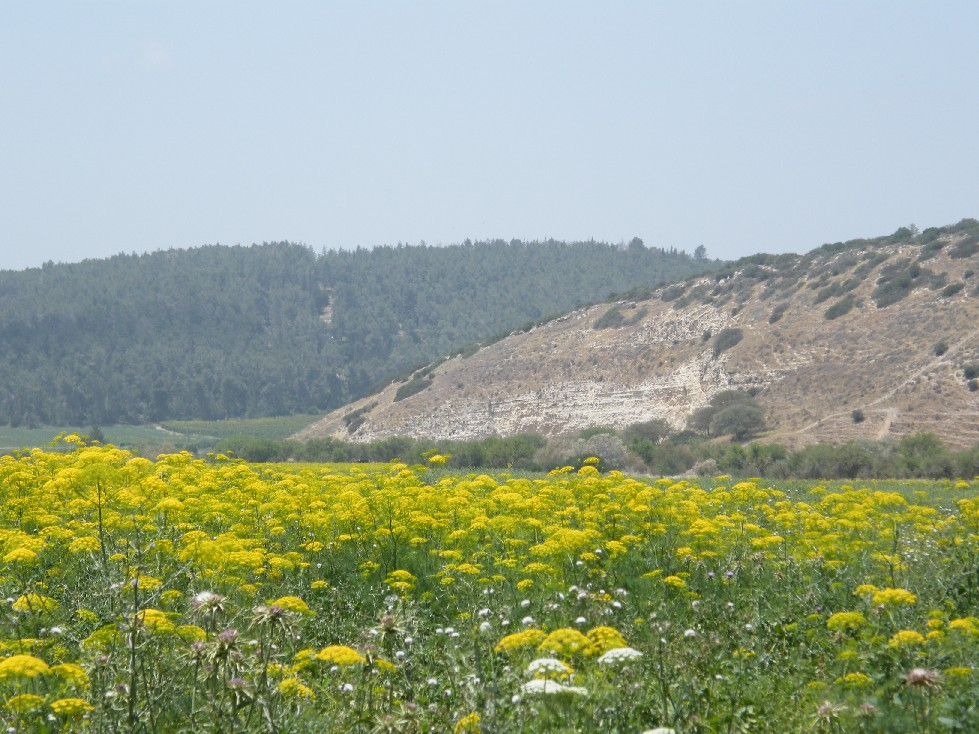
Elah Valley, spring of 2010

Animal species native to the Elah Valley include:

- Mountain gazelle (Gazella gazella)
- Syrian jackal (Canis aureus syriacus)
- Arabian red fox (Vulpes thaleb)
- Crested porcupine (Hystrix cristata)
- Egyptian mongoose (Herpestes ichneumon)
- Southern white-breasted hedgehog (Erinaceus concolor)
- Middle East blind mole-rat (Spalax ehrenbergi; syn. Nannospalax ehrenbergi)
- Greek tortoise (Testudo graeca)
- Günther's vole (Microtus guentheri)
- Sheltopusik (Pseudopus apodus)

== See also ==
- Battle of Ajnadayn (634) between Muslim Arabs and Byzantines
- In the Valley of Elah, 2007 US film

== Gallery ==
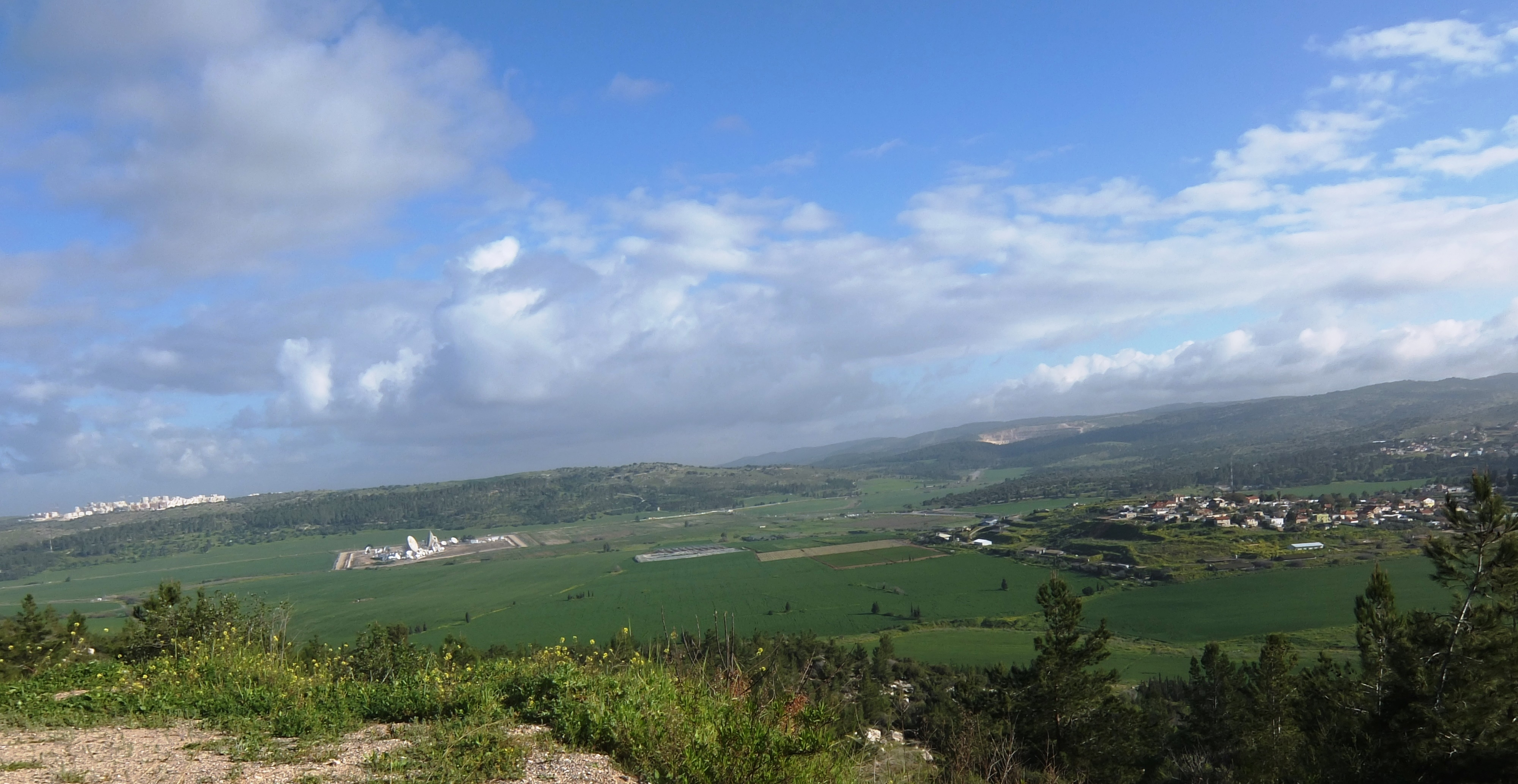
Panoramic view of Elah Valley and Neve Michael as seen from atop Moshav Aderet

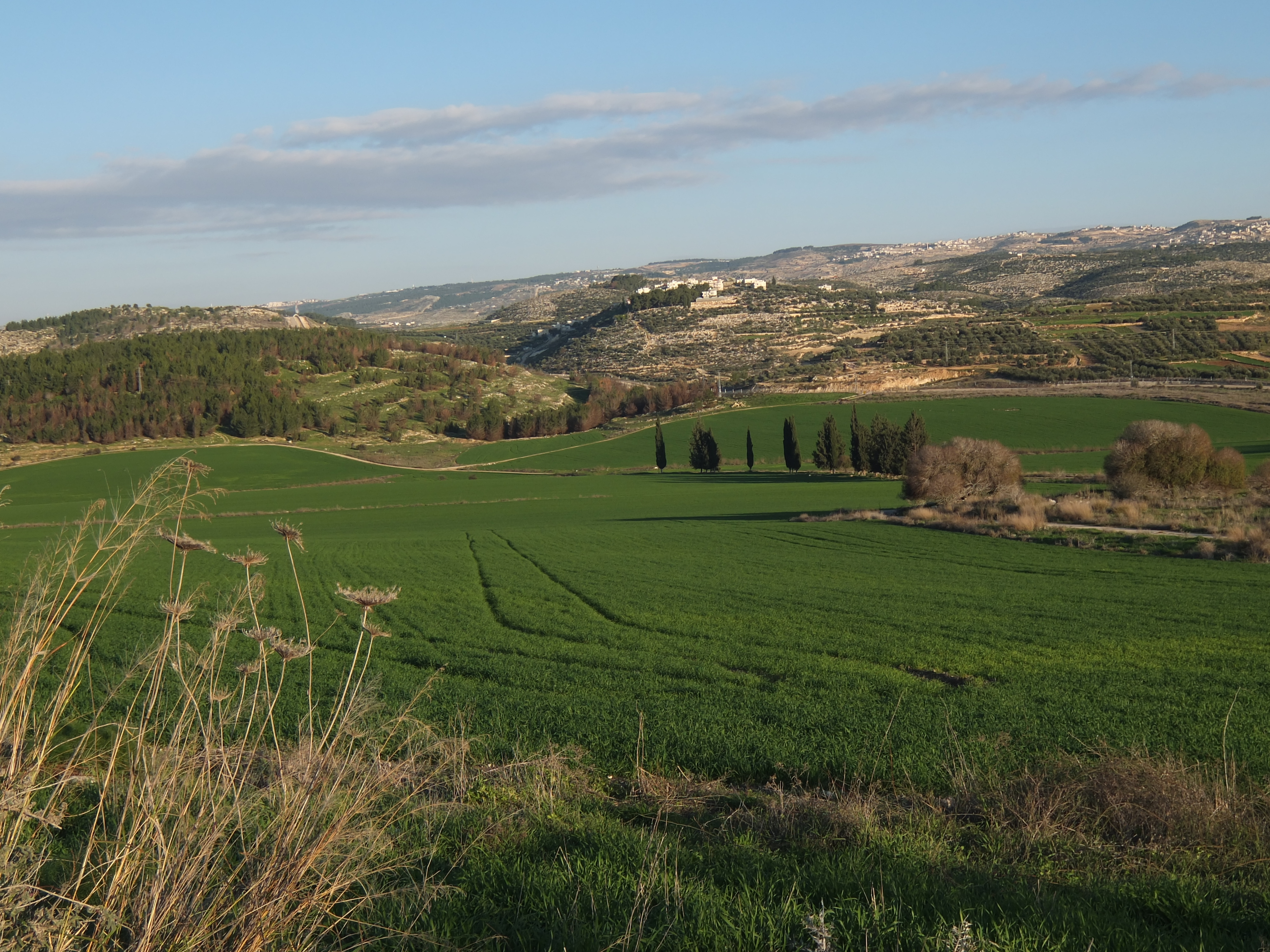
The Valley of Elah, near Adullam

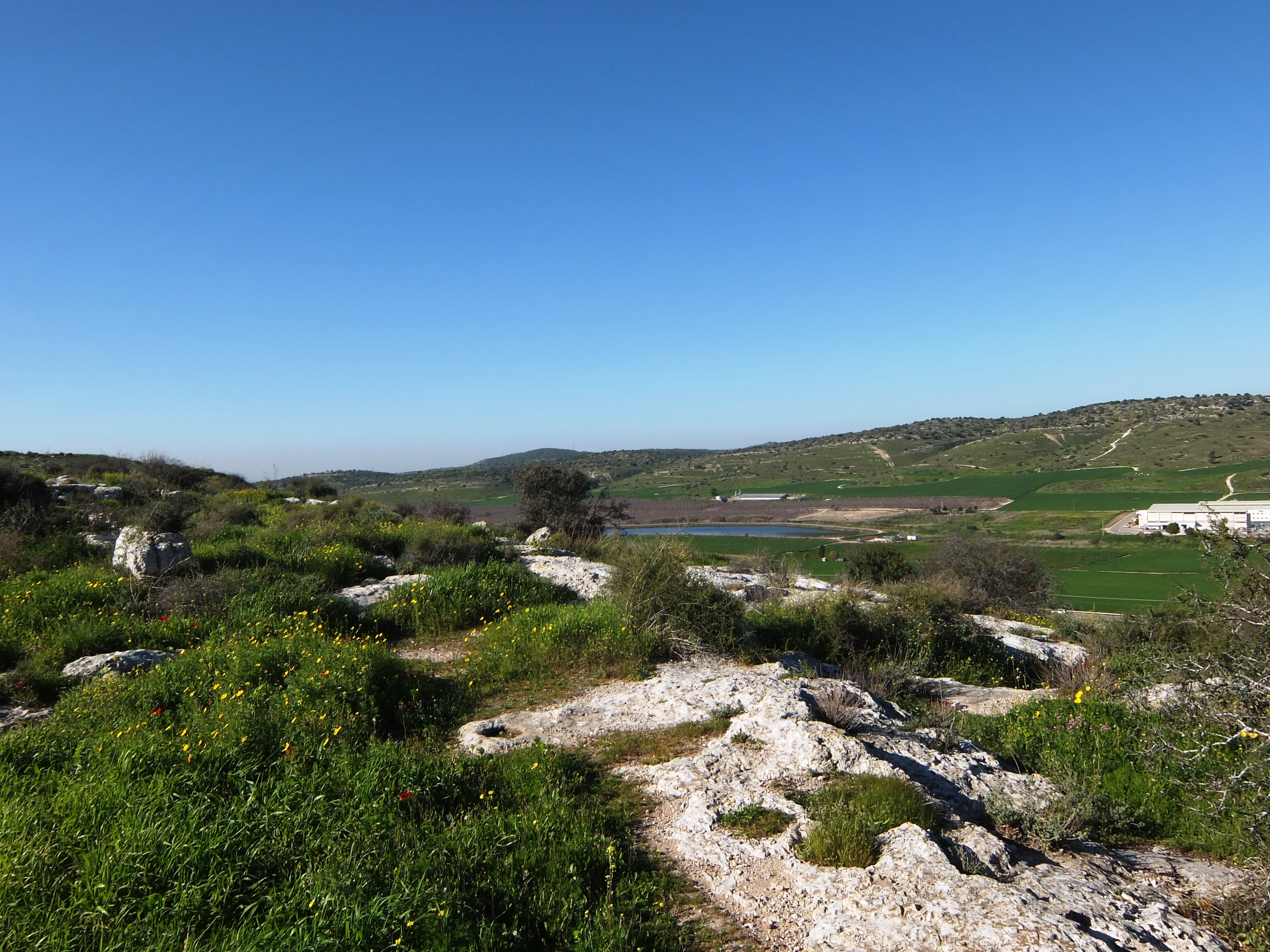
Elah Valley as seen from atop of Tel Socho

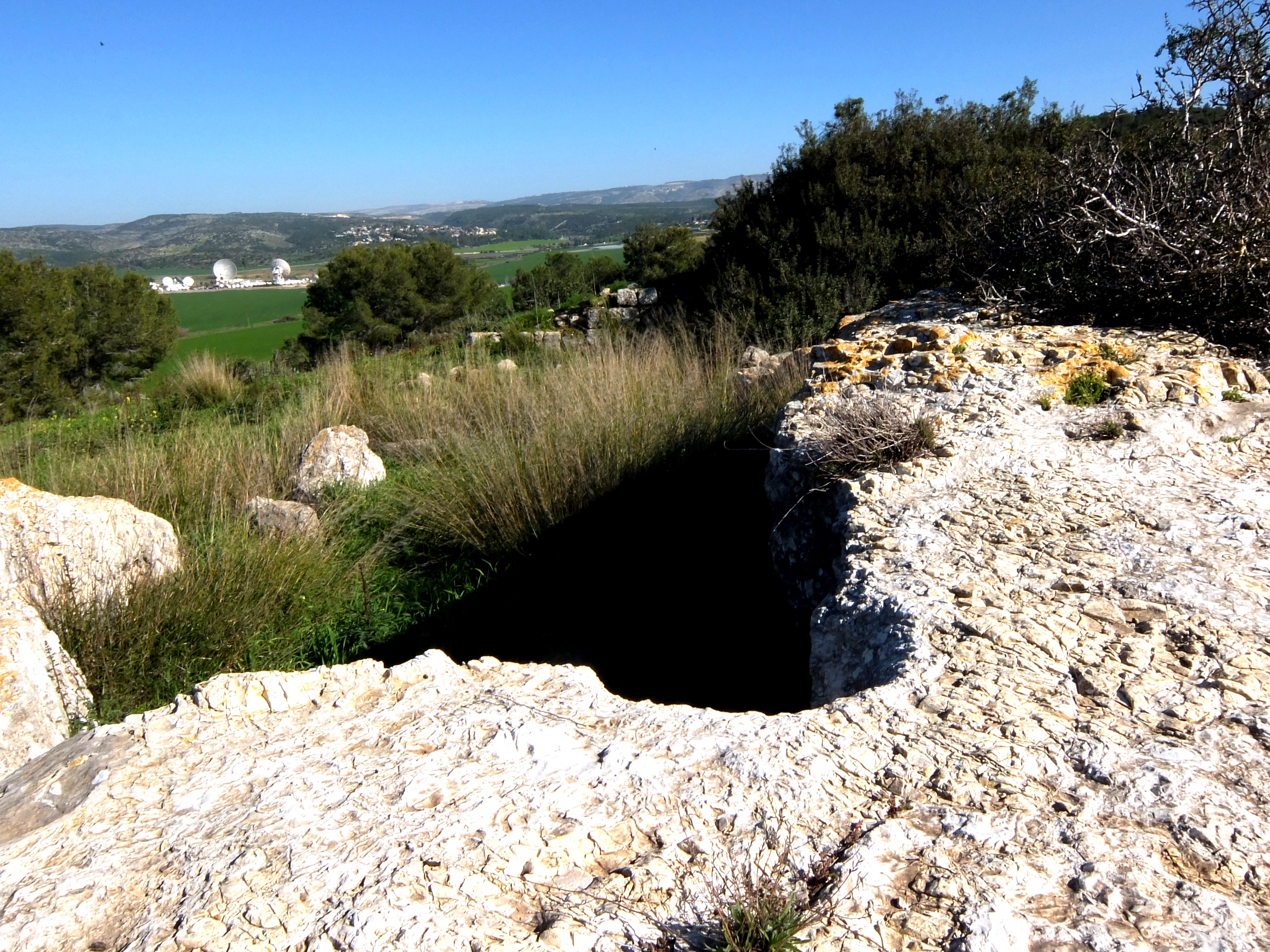
View of Elah Valley, looking east from atop of Tel Socho

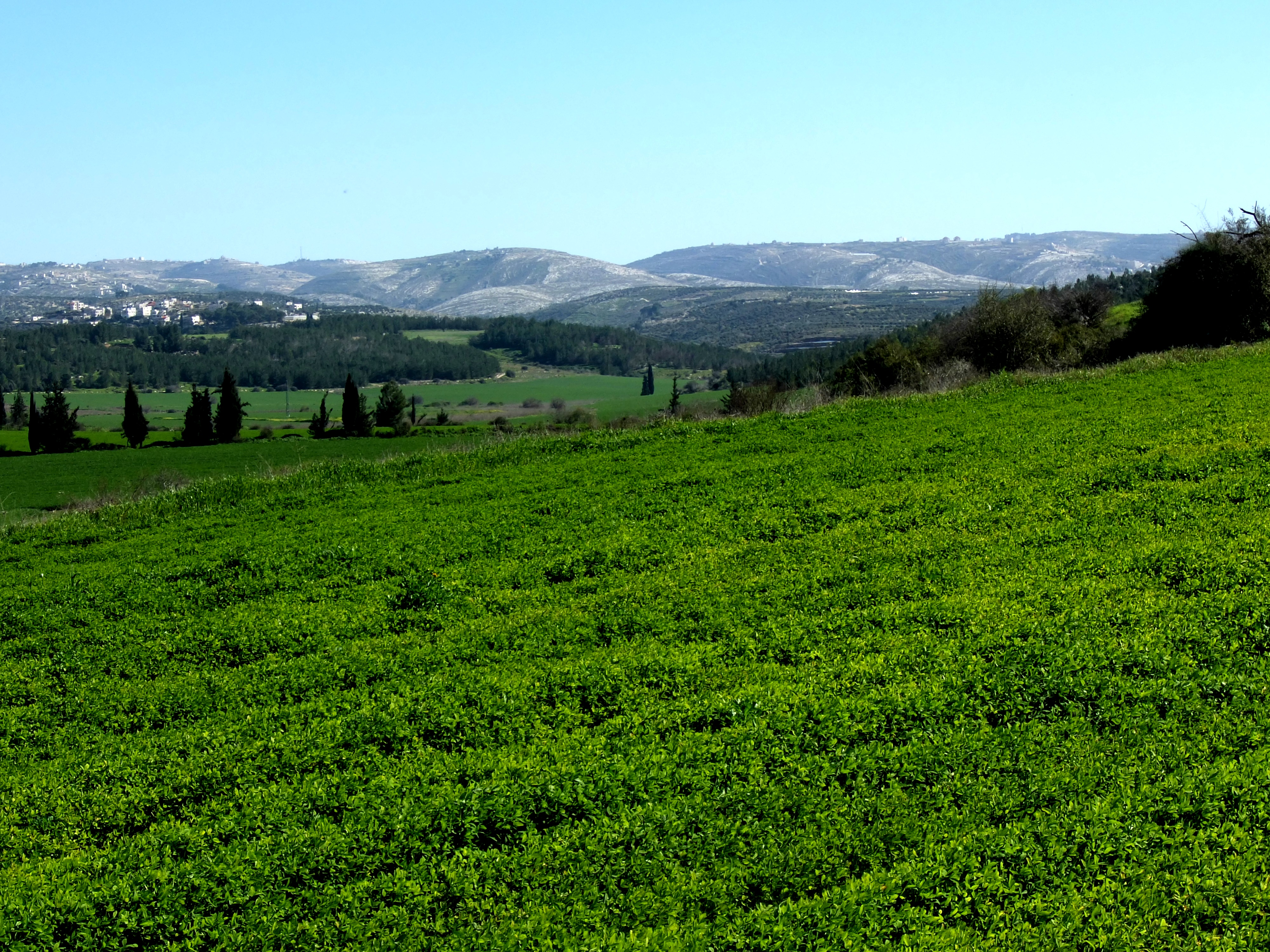
Elah Valley, en route to Tel Socho

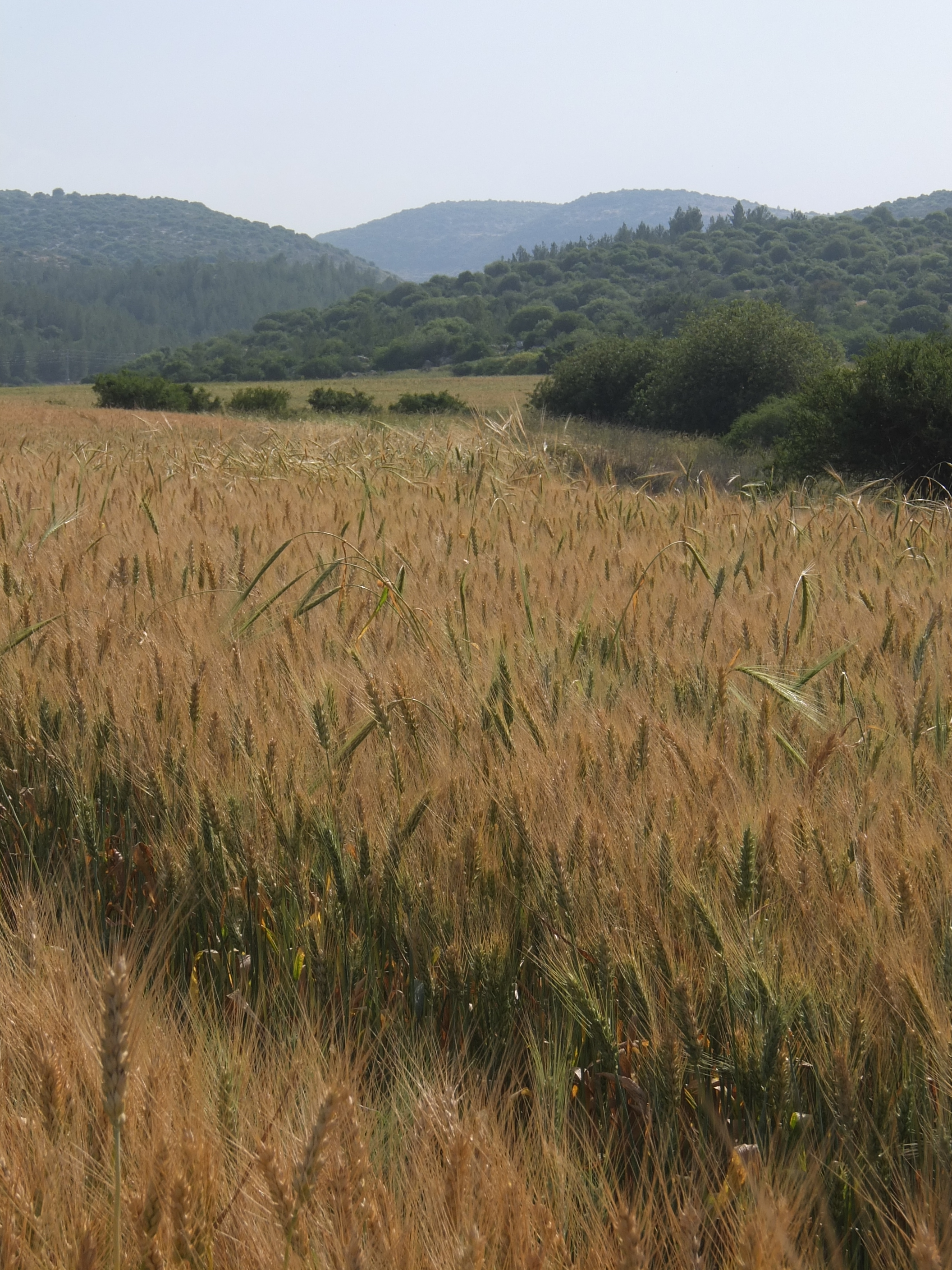
Elah valley in Spring, with ripening grain

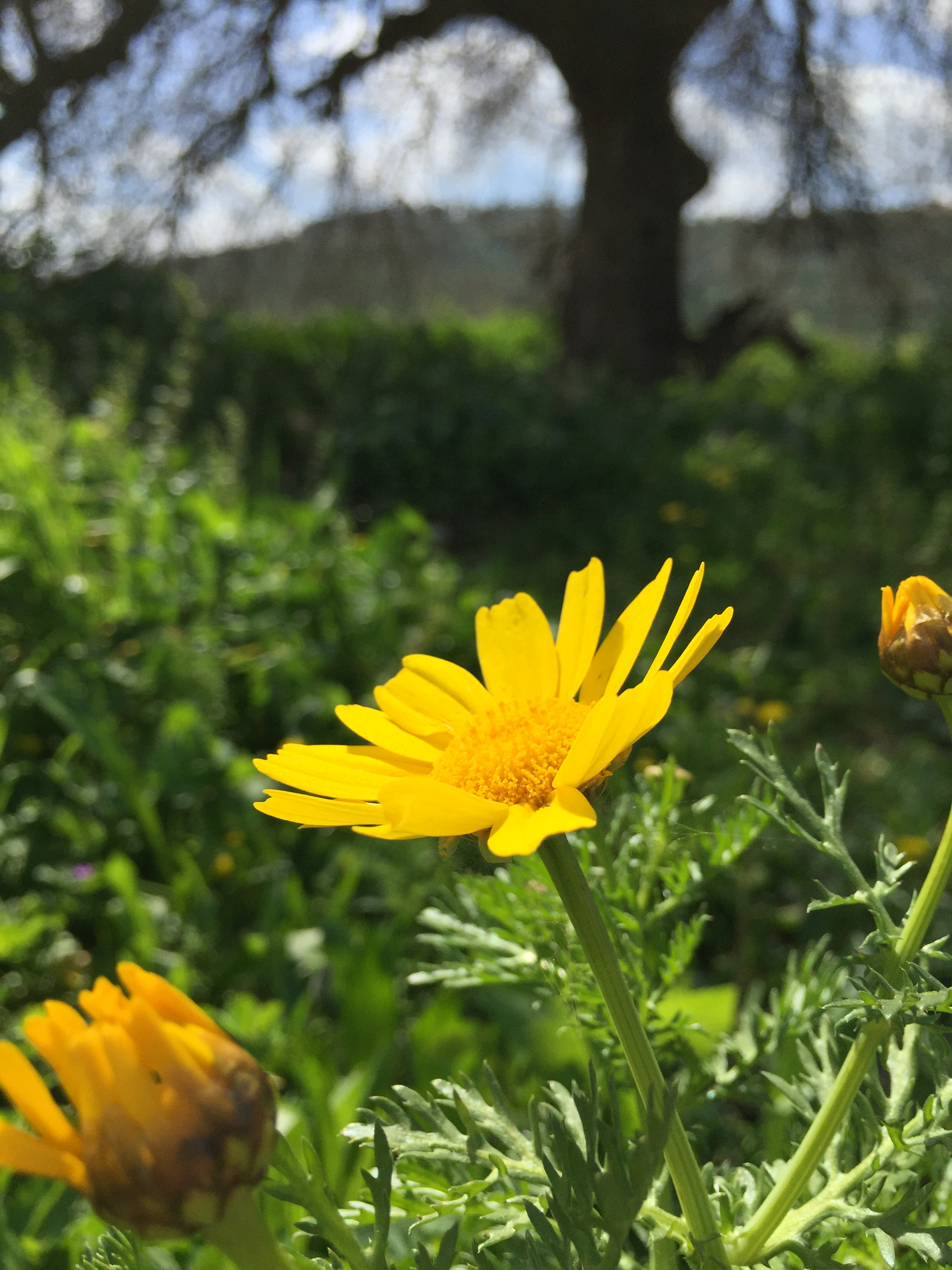
Crown daisy (Glebionis coronaria)

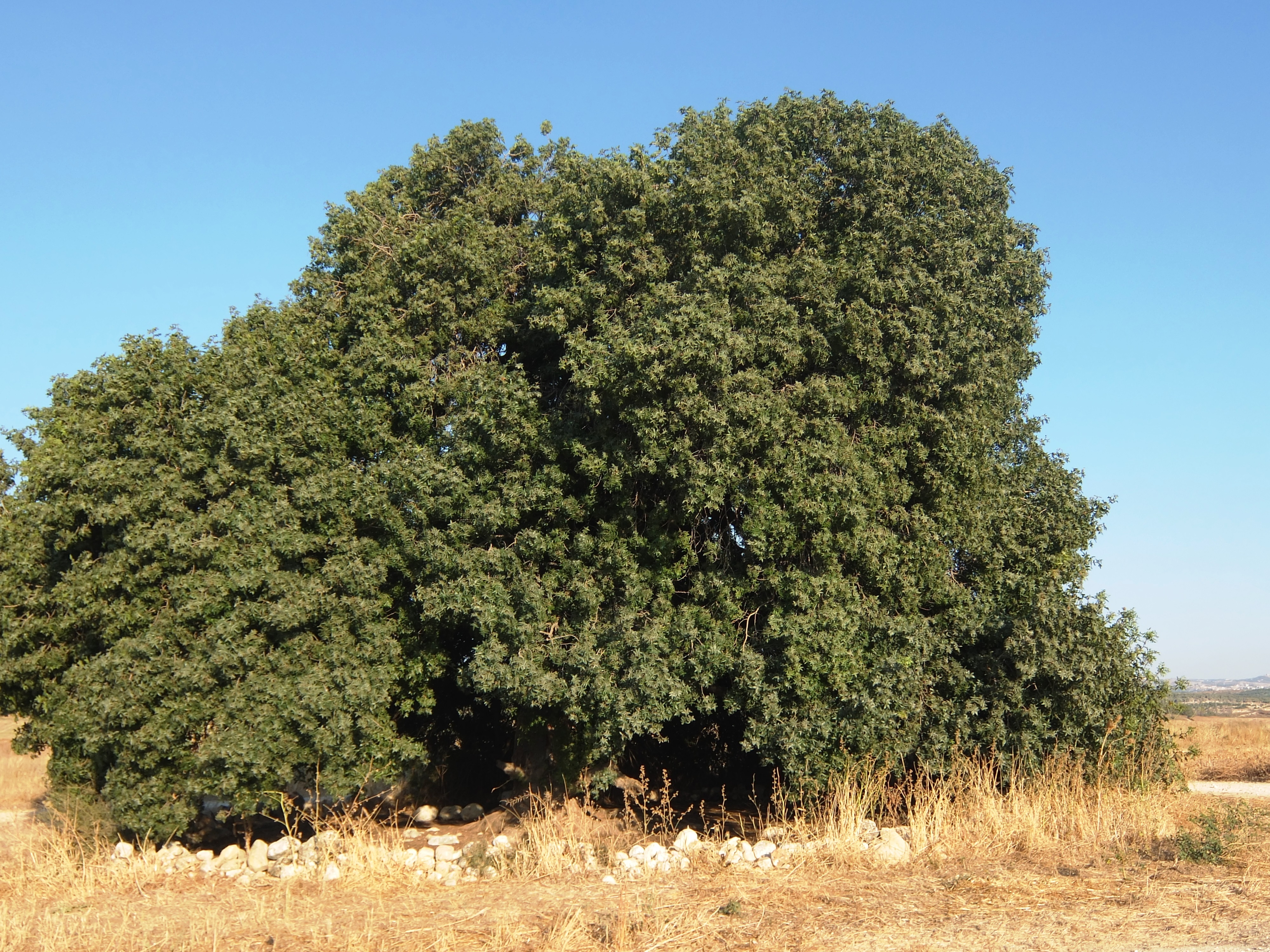
Pistacia atlantica, from which the valley takes its name

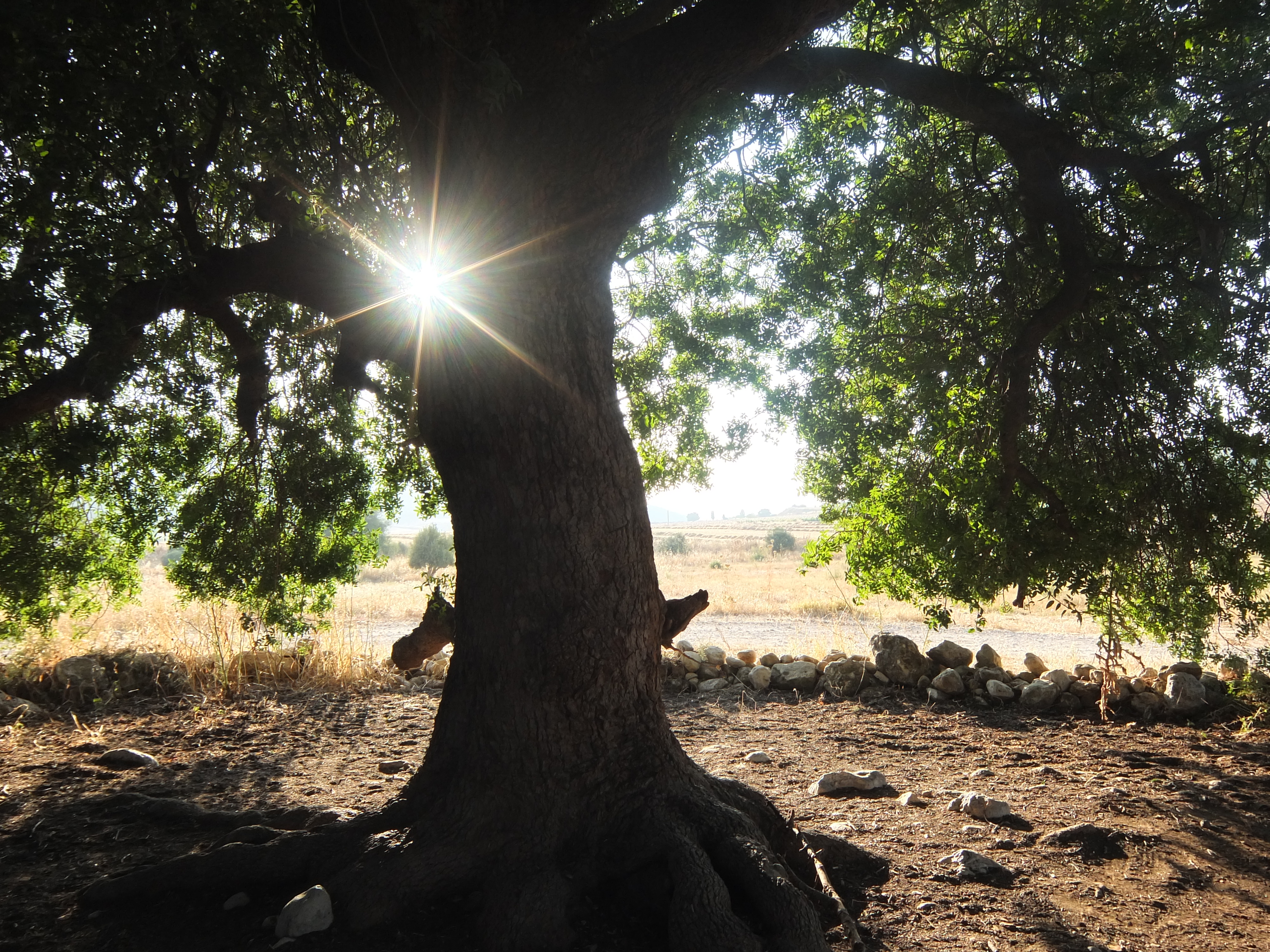
Beneath the shady boughs of a Persian turpentine tree (Pistacia atlantica) in the Elah valley

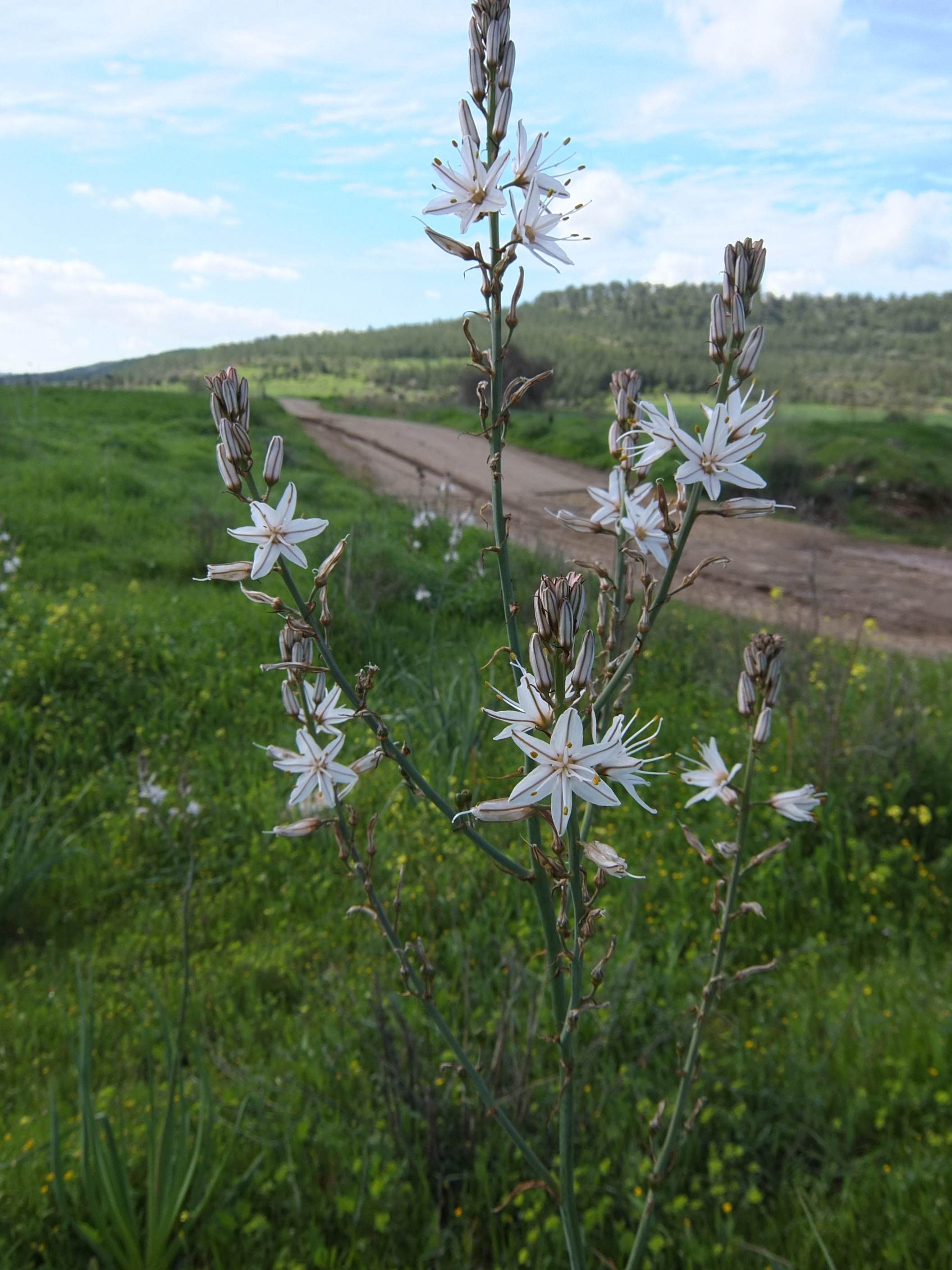
Asphodel in blossom, in the Elah Valley
