= Khirbet al-Deir =

Khirbet al-Deir خربة الدير
- Municipality type D (Village council)

Arabic transcription(s)
  - Arabic: خربة الدير
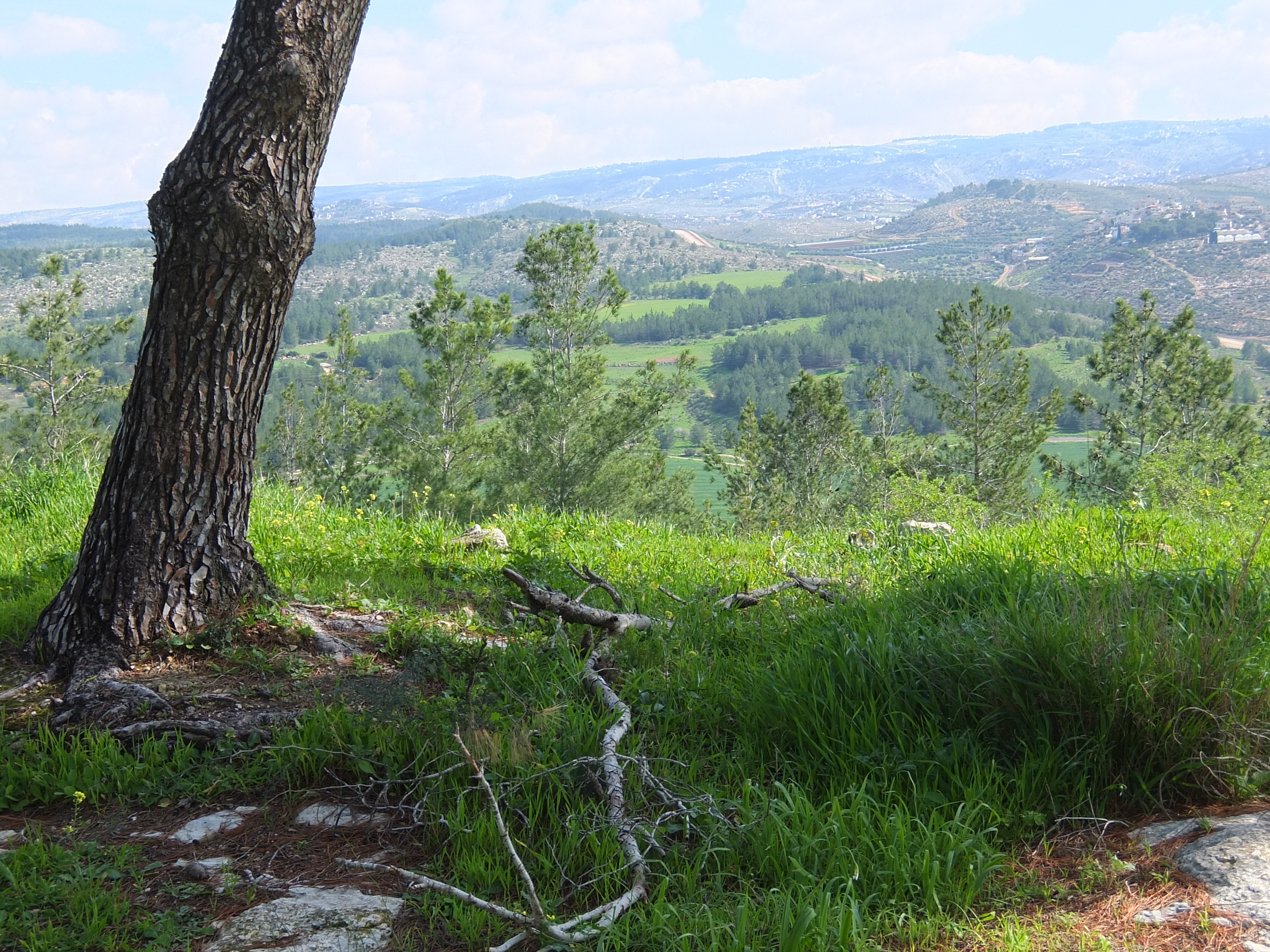
- Idyllic scene overlooking the Palestinian village, Khirbet al-Deir

- Location of Khirbet al-Deir within Palestine
- Coordinates: 31°39′20″N 35°01′30″E
- Palestine grid: 152/117
- State: State of Palestine
- Governorate: Hebron
- Founded: Early 18th century

Government
  - Type: Village council

Population (2017)
  - Total: 358
- Name meaning: "The ruin of the monastery"

Khirbet al-Deir (Arabic: خربة الدير), or Khirbet ed-Deir, is a Palestinian village located 10 kilometres (6.2 mi) southwest of Bethlehem, and 15 kilometres (9.3 mi) northwest of Hebron. The town is in the Hebron Governorate of central West Bank. According to the 2017 Palestinian Central Bureau of Statistics (PCBS) Census, the village had a population of 358 people.

== History ==
=== Late Ottoman period: the village ===
The village was built at the site of an old monastery in the early 18th century, by residents who broke away from Surif.

=== British Mandate period ===
At the time of the 1931 census of Palestine, conducted by the British Mandate authorities, the population of Kh. ed Dair was counted under Dura.

=== Jordanian period ===
After the 1948 Arab-Israeli War, the area was under Jordanian rule.

The Jordanian census of 1961 found 133 inhabitants in Kh[irbet] Deir.

=== 1967-present ===
Since the Six-Day War in 1967, the town has been under Israeli occupation.

The only institution in the village is the Village Council. The population in the 1967 census conducted by the Israeli authorities was 301.

In 2004, Israel started constructing the West Bank barrier near the village; 1500 meters of which pass through village land. 500 dunams of village land have been lost due to the wall; including 400 dunams now isolated behind the wall.

According to statistics provided by ARIJ, in 2009, some 40% of the village's population worked in Israel, being issued permits to work on the Israeli side of the Green Line. The villagers are all Muslims.

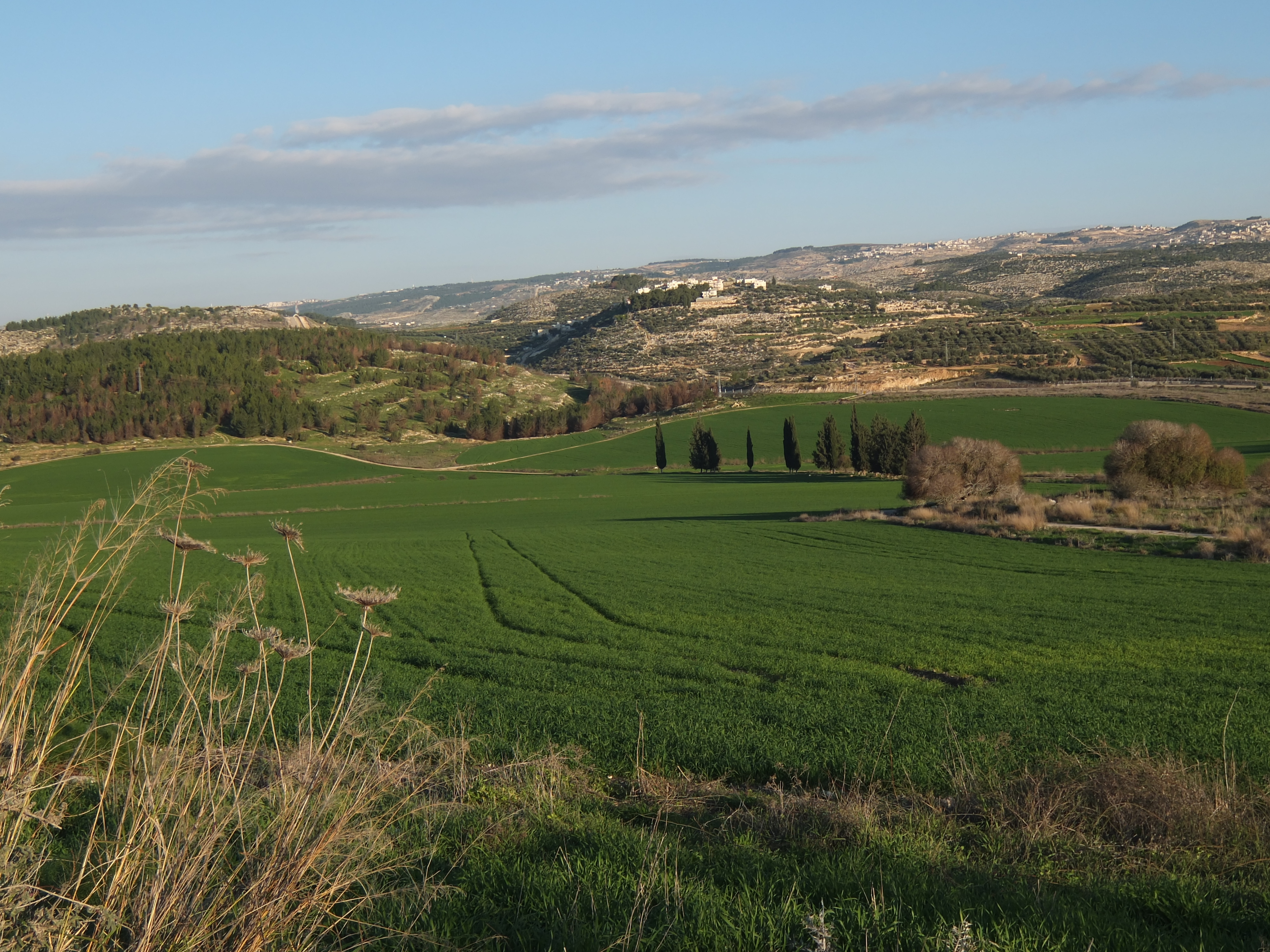
Khirbet al-Deir, seen to the east of the Wadi es-Ṣur valley

== Bibliography ==
- Applied Research Institute–Jerusalem (ARIJ). Khirbet Ad Deir Village: Fact Sheet
- ARIJ. Khirbet Ad Deir: Village Profile
- Conder, C.R.; Kitchener, H.H. (1883). The Survey of Western Palestine: Memoirs of the Topography, Orography, Hydrography, and Archaeology. Vol. 3. London: Committee of the Palestine Exploration Fund.
- Government of Jordan, Department of Statistics (1964). First Census of Population and Housing. Volume I: Final Tables; General Characteristics of the Population (PDF).
- Mills, E., ed. (1932). Census of Palestine 1931. Population of Villages, Towns and Administrative Areas. Jerusalem: Government of Palestine.
- Palmer, E.H. (1881). The Survey of Western Palestine: Arabic and English Name Lists Collected During the Survey by Lieutenants Conder and Kitchener, R. E. Transliterated and Explained by E.H. Palmer. Committee of the Palestine Exploration Fund.
- Perlmann, Joel (November 2011 – February 2012). "The 1967 Census of the West Bank and Gaza Strip: A Digitized Version" (PDF). Levy Economics Institute.
