= Gerald Lankester Harding =

British archaeologist (1901–1979)

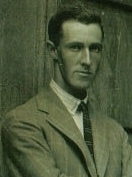
- Born: 8 December 1901; Tianjin, China
- Died: 11 February 1979 (aged 77); London, United Kingdom
- Resting place: Jerash, Jordan
- Citizenship: United Kingdom
- Occupations: Archaeologist, Chief Inspector of Antiquities (British Mandate of Palestine)

Gerald Lankester Harding CBE (8 December 1901 – 11 February 1979) was a British archaeologist who was the director of the Department of Antiquities of Jordan from 1936 to 1956. His tenure spanned the period in which the Dead Sea Scrolls were discovered and brought to public awareness. Without his efforts many of the scrolls might have disappeared into private collections never to be seen again.

== Life ==
Harding was born in Tianjin, North China in 1901, but spent his childhood from age two to 13 in Singapore. He returned to the UK with his parents in 1913, but his father was killed in World War I, and Harding earned his living in a number of jobs from the ages of 16 to 25. During this time, he became fascinated by Egyptian hieroglyphics and eventually joined the evening classes run by the distinguished Egyptologist Dr Margaret Murray. Recognising his brilliance, she encouraged him to write to Sir Flinders Petrie and apply to go on one of his excavations.

In 1926, Petrie was excavating at Tell Jemmeh, near Gaza in southern Palestine, where Harding joined him. Harding's archaeological talents quickly became apparent and with James Leslie Starkey and Olga Tufnell, he became one of a band of young archaeologists known as 'Petrie's pups'. While on the excavations, he quickly learned spoken Arabic from the local Bedouin and spoke their dialect throughout his life despite living in Amman and Lebanon in later years. He also taught himself written Arabic. Harding and the other 'pups' worked with Petrie at Tell Jemmeh, Tell Fara and Tall al-Ajjul between 1926 and 1931, but in 1932 they began a major excavation of their own, under Starkey's direction, at Tell ed-Duweir (Biblical Lachish), where the famous "Lachish Letters", written in the Palaeo-Hebrew script on pot sherds were found. With Olga Tufnell and Charles Inge, Harding was responsible for the second volume of the Final Report.

In 1936, Harding was appointed by the British Mandate government as chief inspector of Antiquities to succeed George Horsfield. With the help of his Bedouin assistant Hasan Awad who was also a superb archaeologist, Harding revitalised the Department of Antiquities and set about exploring, photographing, and cataloguing the sites and antiquities of Jordan. His photographs and meticulous records still are held by the department and record much that has since disappeared. As well as conducting a large number of excavations and surveys, he drew up a set of archaeological maps of Jordan, founded the Archaeological Museum on the citadel in Amman, and in 1951 set up the journal The Annual of the Department of Antiquities of Jordan (ADAJ), which still is in existence.

Harding was very conscious of the need to establish a cadre of young Jordanian archaeologists to succeed him, and over a long period pestered first the Mandate and then the independent Jordanian government to provide funds for Jordanian students to study abroad because, at that time, there were no universities in Jordan. He managed to achieve funding for one student to go to the Institute of Archaeology, University of London, but the student, having finished his course, took a job in the UK, and after this the governments in Jordan were unwilling to pay for others to study archaeology abroad.

In 1948, Harding learned of the existence of the Dead Sea Scrolls from a report in an archaeological journal. As they were found in his jurisdiction, he immediately set out to rescue as many of them as possible and to discover their archaeological context in order to preserve the important information they might yield. In his capacity as acting curator of the Palestine Archaeological Museum (now the Rockefeller Museum) in Jerusalem, he used that institution to aid in the search for the origin of the scrolls. Working with the American School of Oriental Research and the École biblique et archéologique française in Jerusalem, he negotiated access to the scrolls and their point of origin, and he organized funding to purchase them from the Bedouin who originally found them. With Père Roland de Vaux, Harding then organized a panel of brilliant young scholars to work on the scrolls, including Josef Milik, John Strugnell, and John Allegro.

In 1948, Harding and de Vaux finally learned the location of the cave from which the scrolls had come, and together they excavated it. Subsequently, they investigated the settlement site of Qumran and examined two tombs in the Qumran Cemetery. In February 1952, he was involved with de Vaux in the excavation of caves in Wadi Murabba'at. Harding continued to oversee the matters regarding Qumran and the scrolls until 1956 when the Suez Crisis occurred, he together with John Bagot Glubb (Glubb Pasha) and all the remaining British officials were dismissed by the Jordanian government.

In 1959, Harding published The Antiquities of Jordan, an overview of the many and varied archaeological sites of Jordan, which includes a chapter on Qumran, and which remained the most popular guidebook to Jordan for several decades.

The same year, Harding was asked by the British government to conduct the first major archaeological survey in the Aden Protectorate (southern Yemen). This he did and published his results in his book Archaeology in the Aden Protectorate. He also helped to set up and organise the Aden Museum and to secure for it and catalog the famous Muncherjee collection of ancient South Arabian antiquities.

In the late 1940s, Harding had become interested in the Ancient North Arabian inscriptions of which there are many thousands in Jordan. After 1956, he devoted his considerable energies to publishing several thousands of them. In 1971, he produced An Index to the Concordance of Pre-Islamic Names and Inscriptions, a massive work which is used universally by those working on Ancient North and South Arabian inscriptions.

Harding died in London, where he had been sent for medical treatment. However, as a mark of respect for the service he had given to the Hashemite Kingdom of Jordan, his ashes were returned to Jordan and by permission of the authorities were buried overlooking the archaeological site at Jerash.

Harding reportedly inspired the character of Father Lankester Merrin in American author William Peter Blatty's novel The Exorcist; Blatty had met Harding while stationed in Beirut.

== Selected publications by Harding ==
- 1949 "Recent work on the Jerash forum" Palestine Exploration Quarterly 81 (Jan.–April 1949): 12–20.
- 1949 "The Dead Sea Scrolls" Palestine Exploration Quarterly 81 (July–Oct. 1949): 112–116.
- 1952 "Khirbet Qumran and Wady Muraba'at" Palestine Exploration Quarterly 84 (May–Oct. 1952): 104–109.
- 1953 Four Tomb Groups from Jordan (London: Palestine Exploration Fund)
- 1953 "The Cairn of Hani'" Annual of the Department of Antiquities of Jordan 3 (1953): 8–56
- 1958 "Recent discoveries in Jordan" Palestine Exploration Quarterly 90 (Jan.–Jun. 1958): 7–18.
- 1959 The Antiquities of Jordan (London: Lutterworth Press).
- 1971 An Index and Concordance of Pre-Islamic Names and Inscriptions (University of Toronto, Near and Middle East Series 8)
- 1978 with F.V. Winnett Inscriptions from Fifty Safaitic Cairns (University of Toronto, Near and Middle East Series 9)
  - A full bibliography of Harding's works, prepared by Michael Macdonald, is published as "A Bibliography of Gerald Lankester Harding" in Annual of the Department of Antiquities of Jordan 24 (1980): 8–12.
