= Olga Tufnell =

British archaeologist (1905–1985)

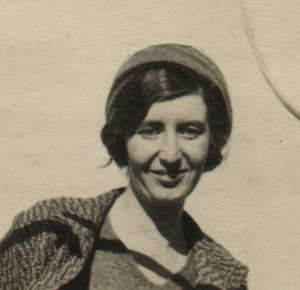
- Tufnell in 1931
- Born: 26 January 1905; Sudbury, Suffolk, England
- Died: 11 April 1985 (aged 80); London, England
- Known for: Lachish excavations
- Scientific career
- Fields: Archaeology
- Workplaces: Wellcome Foundation

James Leslie Starkey and British archaeologist Olga Tufnell, with a Late Bronze Age pottery jar discovered during excavations at Tel Lachish

Olga Tufnell FSA (26 January 1905 – 11 April 1985) was a British archaeologist who assisted on the excavation of the ancient city of Lachish in the 1930s. She had no formal training in archaeology, but had worked as a secretary for Flinders Petrie for a number of years before being given a field assignment. Olga then went on to join James Leslie Starkey in the expedition to find Lachish in 1929 and remained part of the team for the following seasons.

When Starkey was killed in 1938, the team finished the season then closed the site. Olga volunteered to write up the report of the dig and spent the following twenty years researching and writing up the majority of the excavation report. Olga's work has been regarded as the "pre-eminent source book for Palestinian archeology". Once the report was published, she turned her attention to cataloguing scarabs and other seals.

Many of Olga Tufnell's original letters and photographs are housed today at the Palestine Exploration Fund in London. Those published from 1927-1938 provide insights into dig life and archaeology, as well as the wider socio-cultural, political, and gendered context of colonial life within Mandate-era Palestine.

== Early life ==
Olga Tufnell was born on 26 January 1905 in Sudbury, Suffolk, to a prominent landholding family. Her father, Beauchamp Le Fevre Tufnell, had been a second lieutenant in the 4th Battalion of Essex Regiment, and her mother, Blanche, maintained a broad range of cultural interests, as well as working with the Anglo-Czech Society. Olga was a middle child with two brothers, Joliffe Gilbert Tufnell and Louis de Saumarez Tufnell. She spent her early life in Little Waltham, and was educated at schools in London and Belgium before going to finishing school in Italy.

When Olga had completed her time at the finishing school in 1922, she went to help her mother's close friend Hilda Petrie and her husband Flinders Petrie, with an exhibition of their recent finds at University College London, before taking on a secretarial role at the British School of Archaeology in Egypt. She held the position of Hilda Petrie's secretary for five years, though she described it as "dull and repetitive work" in fundraising, but also spent some time drawing and repairing pottery. Olga's work evidently impressed Sir Flinders who, at the end of 1927, offered her an opportunity to assist him in the field in 1928.

== Expeditions ==
Although Sir Flinders himself did not join the expedition in 1929, he sent Olga with a group of other archaeologists to Qau, where they spent two months recording the reliefs from the tombs of the ancient rulers. She and a few colleagues, including Gerald Lankester Harding, then joined the season's primary expedition, which was being led by James Leslie Starkey at the Tell Far'a tomb group in Palestine. During the time she would not only supervise the work of a team, but also ran an evening clinic for the Arab workers and families, as well as other local people. In all, she would help up to forty people per day with minor injuries or upset stomachs. Sir Flinders joined the group in 1930 and after reviewing Olga's work, allowed her to publish it under her own name. In 1931, during the Petrie expedition to Tell el-'Ajjul, Olga discovered a Hyksos tomb which included a horse burial.

In 1932, Starkey secured funding from Charles Marston and Henry Wellcome to start an expedition apart from the Petries, which Olga joined. The Wellcome-Marston expedition was to focus on the excavation of the ancient city of Lachish, a stronghold mentioned in the Bible. Over the next six years, the team made some important finds, including the Lachish letters, but the work was interrupted by the murder of Starkey, while he was en route to the opening of the Rockefeller Museum in Jerusalem. The remaining team finished during the 1938/9 season, then closed the site. Olga wrote the final report.

== Return to London ==
The Wellcome Foundation allowed Olga some rooms at St John's Lodge in London's Regent's Park, where the University College London's Institute of Archaeology had recently been established. Her work was almost immediately put on hold due to the outbreak of World War II, as Olga was co-opted to the BBC Arabic radio station due to her association with the Middle East. Around the same time, she also became an air raid warden.

At the end of the war, she returned to her work on the report. She controversially published findings that held that the time period between two occupational levels, Level II (preceding Babylonian conquest by Nebuchadnezzar) and Level III (preceding Assyrian conquest by Sennacherib) was likely to be in the range of 100 years, rather than a decade, as Starkey had suggested. Although the majority held that Starkey's interpretation was more likely, in 1973 subsequent excavations vindicated her opinion.

In 1951, Olga became a Fellow of the Society of Antiquaries of London. She was proud of this award and called it one of her "greatest achievements". Olga continued to study and to write up the Lachish report for 20 years, with the final publication (Lachish IV) in 1957. Whilst writing the report, she dealt with requests related to the excavation, including distributing the Lachish finds and sending some "unwanted pots" to a school museum. The multi-volume report was described as the "pre-eminent source book for Palestinian archaeology".

== Later life ==
Once the full report had been published, Olga turned her attention to the study of scarabs, working with William Ayres Ward. Although many scholars dismissed the field of scarabs and seals as "unreliable of chronology", Olga meticulously recorded the dimensions and styles of the artefacts. She was an early adopter of the use of computers for measurement of the scarabs and she was due to present a paper on that use of computers just days after her death in April 1985. In 1983, 50 years after the initial excavations, Olga was invited back to the site of Lachish, to see the more modern excavations by Tel Aviv University. There she was greeted by 200 local archaeologists, who welcomed her enthusiastically.
