= Al-Qubayba, Hebron =

al-Qubayba القبيبة Qubeiba
- Etymology: The little (eastern) dome
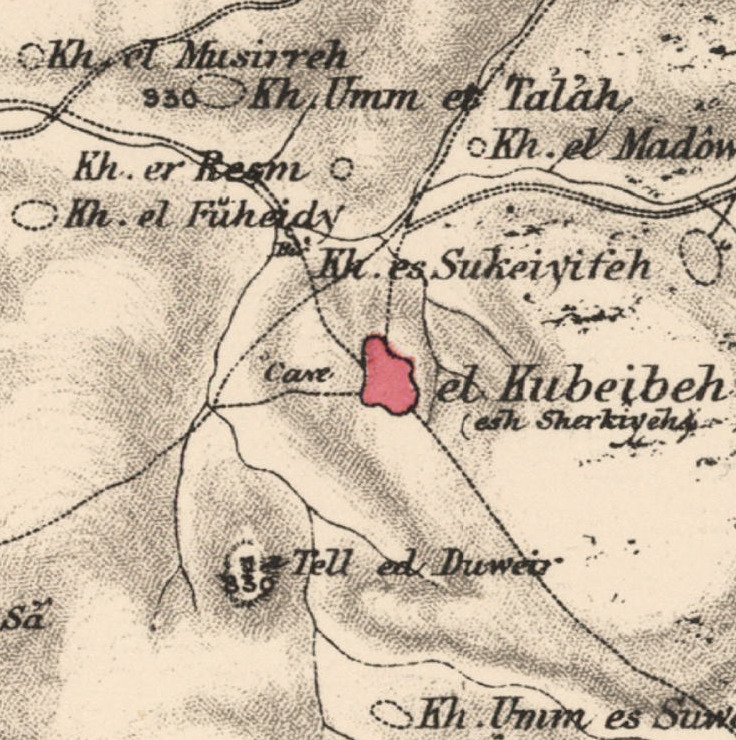
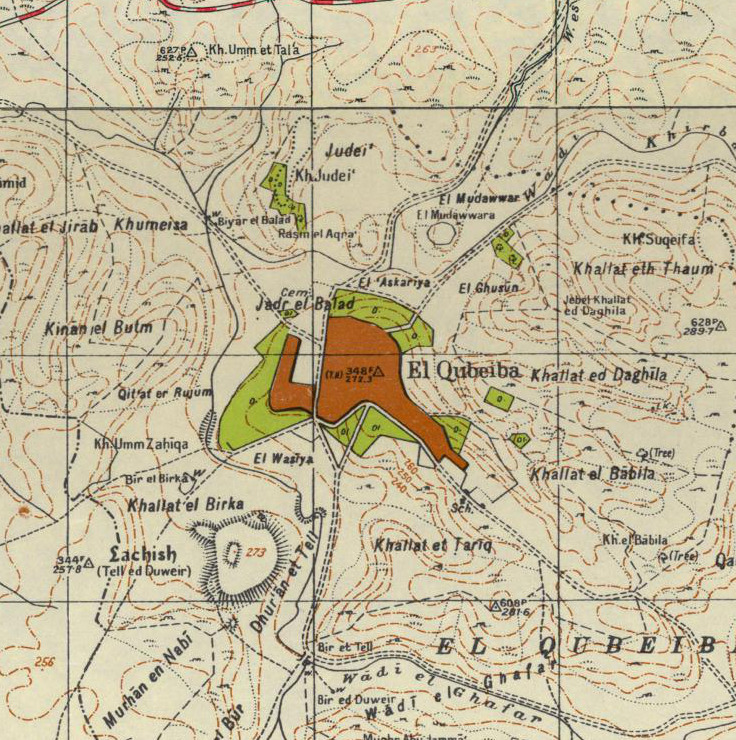
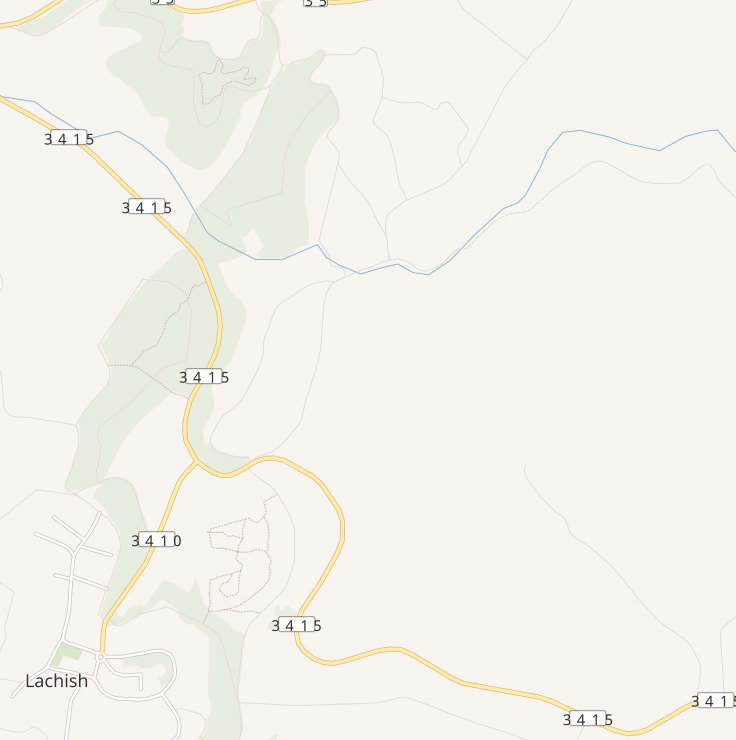
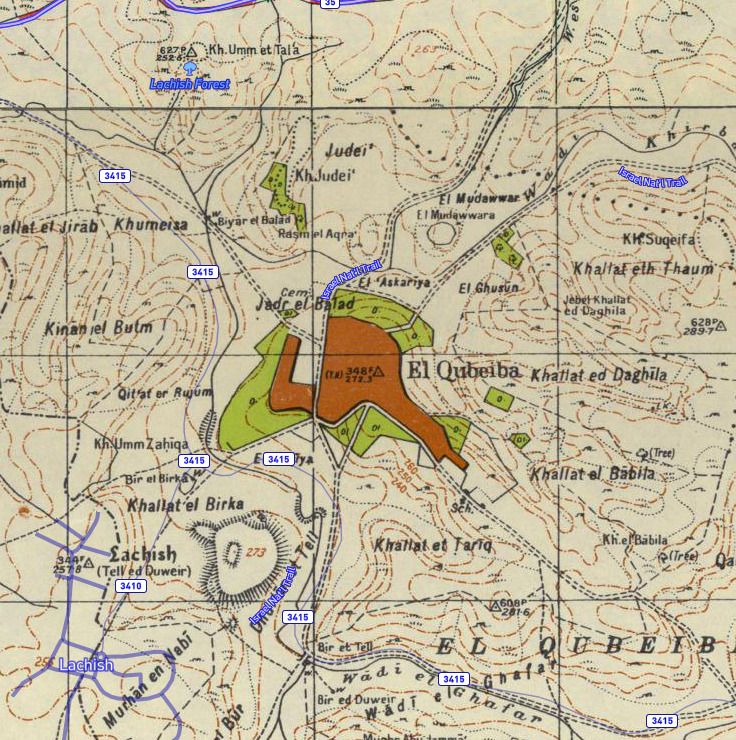
- 1870s map 1940s map modern map 1940s with modern overlay map A series of historical maps of the area around Al-Qubayba, Hebron (click the buttons)

- Location within Mandatory Palestine
- Coordinates: 31°34′20″N 34°51′16″E
- Palestine grid: 136/108
- Geopolitical entity: Mandatory Palestine
- Subdistrict: Hebron
- Date of depopulation: 28 October 1948

Area
  - Total: 11,912 dunams (11.912 km^{2}; 4.599 sq mi)

Population (1945)
  - Total: 1,060
- Cause(s) of depopulation: Military assault by Yishuv forces
- Current Localities: Lakhish

Al-Qubayba (Arabic: القبيبة, قبيبة ابن عوّاد), also known as Gbebah, Qubeiba or Qobebet Ibn 'Awwad, was a Palestinian village, located 24 kilometers northwest of Hebron.

== Name ==
The eponym of the village, "Ibn 'Awwad" or "Ibn 'Awadh", was named after the clan residing therein.

== History ==
Known in Crusader times as Deirelcobebe, the ruins of the ancient Canaanite and Judean city of Lachish lay adjacent to the village, which was subject to extensive archaeological excavations by the British Mandatory authorities in Palestine, and by Israeli authorities subsequent to its capture during the 1948 Arab-Israeli war.

In 1136 the King of Jerusalem, Fulk confirmed Deirelcobebe as a casale under the Knights Hospitallers.

=== Ottoman Empire ===
In 1517, Al-Qubayba was incorporated into the Ottoman Empire with the rest of Palestine, and in 1596 it appeared in the tax registers as being in the nahiya (subdistrict) of Gaza under the liwa' (district) of Gaza. It had a population of 33 Muslim household, an estimated 182 persons. They paid a fixed tax-rate of 25% on agricultural products, including wheat, barley, sesame, and fruit trees, as well as goats and beehives; a total of 4,600 akçe. 11/24 of the revenue went to a Waqf.

The modern village was founded in the late 18th or early 19th century, and was renamed Qubaybat Bani 'Awwad after the clan controlling it. In 1838 Edward Robinson noted 200 reapers and gleaners at work in a field near Al-Qubayba (which he called Kubeibeh). He added: "Some were taking their refreshment, and offered us some of their "parched corn." In the season of harvest, the grains of wheat, not yet fully dry and hard, are roasted in a pan or an iron plate, and constitute a very palliative article of bread; this is eaten along with bread, or instead of it." Robinson further noted Kubeibeh as a Muslim village, in the Gaza district.

In 1883, the PEF's Survey of Western Palestine described Al-Qubayba as a large village built of adobe brick, situated on rolling hills near a plain, surrounded by a barren and stony area.

=== British Mandate ===
In the 1922 census of Palestine conducted by the British Mandate authorities, Al-Qubaiba had a population of 646, all Muslims, increasing in the 1931 census to 800, still all Muslim, in a total of 141 houses.

The village had a school, a mosque, and a number of small shops. Two wells located northwest and southwest of it provided drinking water.

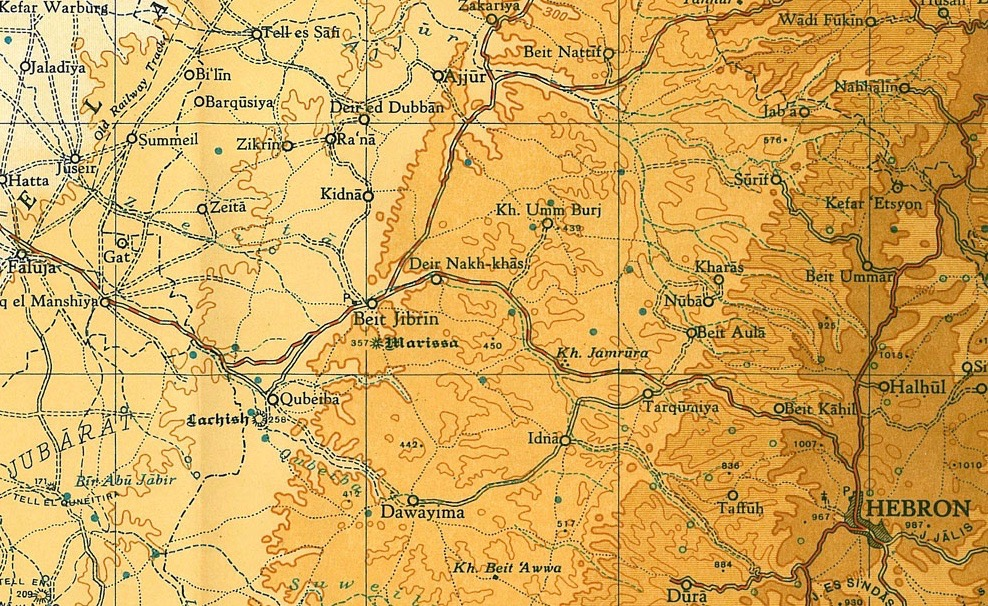
el Qubeiba 1945 1:250,000

In the 1945 statistics the population of Al-Qubayba was 1,060, all Muslims, who owned 11,912 dunams of land according to an official land and population survey. 8109 dunams were for cereals while 35 dunams were built-up (urban) land.

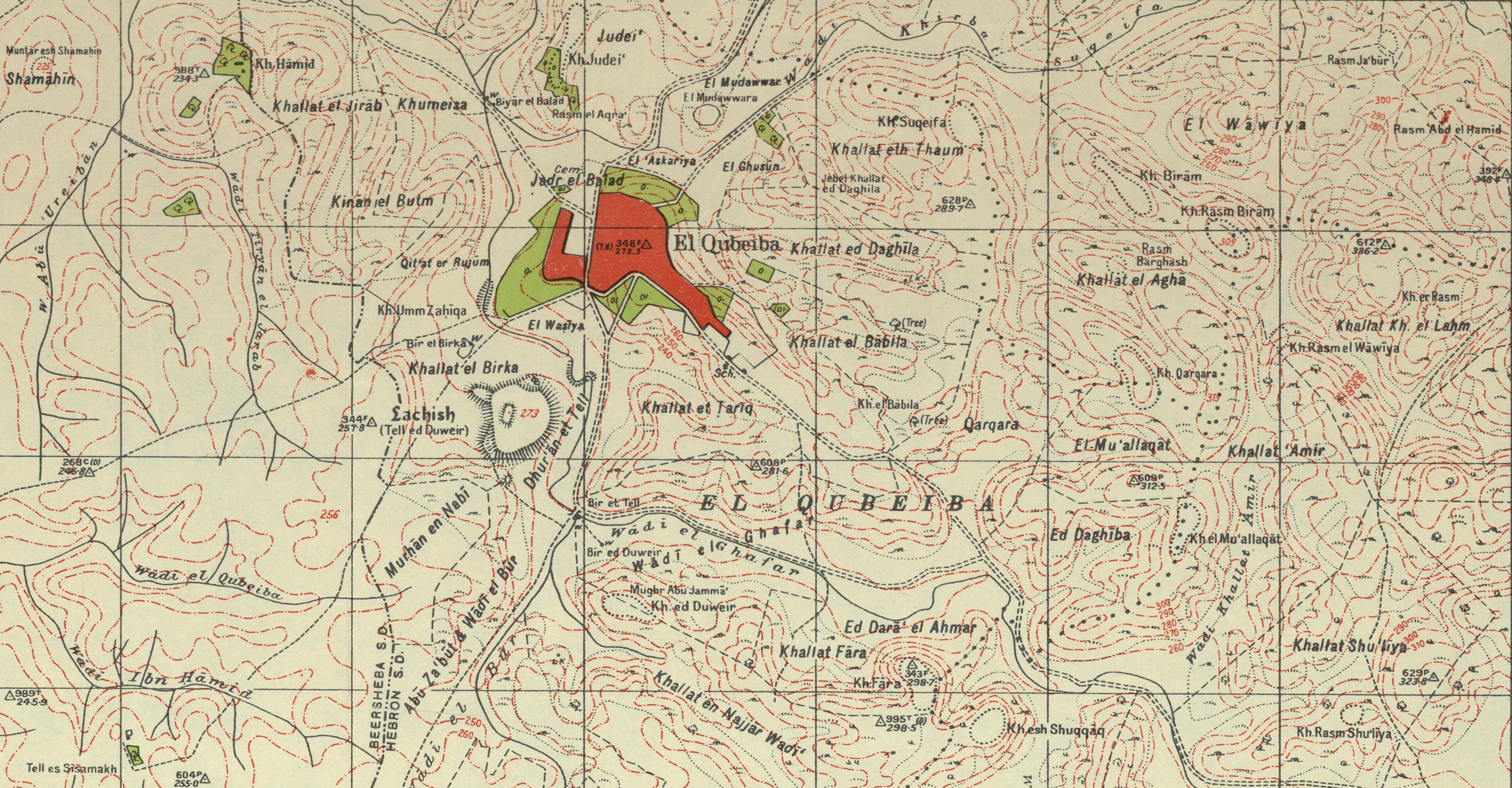
el Qubeiba 1947 1:20,000

Al-Qubayba was in the territory allotted to the Arab state under the 1947 UN Partition Plan.

==== Lachish excavations and land dispute ====
The The British expedition directed by James Leslie Starkey began work at Tell ed-Duweir in 1932. The expedition constructed an excavation camp near the mound and employed one hundred villagers,from families that cooperated with the expedition. Palestinian Rural History Project oral histories from former residents describe the excavations as an important source of employment and medical care.

Negotiations to acquire the tel's summit began in 1933, but several owners made the sale conditional upon employment for members and expensive compensation. After negotiations broke down in April 1934, the Mandatory government expropriated Tell ed-Duweir. Ddisagreements over ownership delayed the final valuation and payment until 1943.

In May 1937, Ṣāliḥ al-Ḥājj Ḥamad Abū ʿAwwād petitioned the Department of Antiquities, complaining that Starkey had used his land without paying. Abū ʿAwwād stated that his livelihood depended upon the land and described himself as unable to obtain redress. The Director of Antiquities instructed him to address further correspondence to Starkey or to the district officer in Hebron. Historians Roy Marom and Yosef Garfinkel connected these grievances to J. L. Starkey’s assassination in January 1938.

=== Israel ===
The village was first attacked during Operation Barak. Though defended by Egyptian forces, al-Qubayba was taken by Israeli forces in the final stages of Operation Yoav on 28 October 1948. The population had fled and the village was destroyed.

The area was subsequently incorporated into the State of Israel and in 1955 the moshav of Lakhish was established to the southwest of the village site on what had been village lands.

Of the village mosque, an elementary school, and more than 141 houses that made up al-Qubayba, Walid Khalidi notes that all that remains to mark the site in contemporary times are cacti and a handful of olive trees.

== Culture and village life ==
The inhabitants of the village mostly grew cereals; wheat and barley were grown by the well off, and corn by the rest. The village mostly bartered with surrounding villages such as Al-Dawayima and Beit Gibrin, most of the cereals harvest was used to sustain sheep herds, from where in most of the village income is derived.

A woman's thob (loose fitting robe with sleeves), from Qubeiba dated to about 1910 forms part of the Museum of International Folk Art (MOIFA) collection at Santa Fe. The dress is a collage of different fabrics, textures and colors. The front and the upper half of the back are of black cotton. The chest panel, the side panels and the lower back of the skirt are handwoven indigo linen. Colorful silk cross-stitch embroidery, in red, violet, orange, yellow, green and black, create an effect described as "particularly gay, twinkling" The qabbeh (square chest panel) is embroidered with the qurunful ("clove") motif, and it has vertical rows of eight-pointed stars, called qamr ("moons"), and a row of the mushut ("combs") pattern. There are eight embroidered columns on each side panel of the dress. The patterns which are used are fanajin qahweh ("coffee cups"), khem-el-basha ("the pashas tent"), irq el-ward ("rose branch"), and miftah Khalil ("key of Hebron"). There is also a pattern (with flowers, moons, trees, tents and tiles) not seen anywhere else in the MOMA collection. Finally, there is also some embroidery at the wrists.

== See also ==
- Depopulated Palestinian locations in Israel
- List of villages depopulated during the Arab-Israeli conflict
- Palestinian costumes

== Bibliography ==
- Barron, J.B., ed. (1923). Palestine: Report and General Abstracts of the Census of 1922. Government of Palestine. Table VII, Sub-district of Ramallah.
- Conder, C.R.; Kitchener, H.H. (1883). The Survey of Western Palestine: Memoirs of the Topography, Orography, Hydrography, and Archaeology. Vol. 3. London: Committee of the Palestine Exploration Fund.
- Dauphin, C. (1998). La Palestine byzantine, Peuplement et Populations. BAR International Series 726 (in French). Vol. III : Catalogue. Oxford: Archeopress. ISBN 0-860549-05-4.
- Delaville Le Roulx, J. (1894). Cartulaire général de l'Ordre des Hospitaliers (in Latin). Vol. 1. Paris.
- Government of Palestine, Department of Statistics (1945). Village Statistics, April, 1945.
- Hadawi, S. (1970). Village Statistics of 1945: A Classification of Land and Area ownership in Palestine. Palestine Liberation Organization Research Center. Archived from the original on 2018-12-08.
- Hütteroth, W.-D.; Abdulfattah, K. (1977). "Historical Geography of Palestine, Transjordan and Southern Syria in the Late 16th Century". Erlanger Geographische Arbeiten. Sonderband 5. Erlangen, Germany: Vorstand der Fränkischen Geographischen Gesellschaft: 146. ISBN 3-920405-41-2.
- Khalidi, W. (1992). All That Remains: The Palestinian Villages Occupied and Depopulated by Israel in 1948. Washington D.C.: Institute for Palestine Studies. ISBN 0-88728-224-5.
- Mills, E., ed. (1932). Census of Palestine 1931. Population of Villages, Towns and Administrative Areas. Jerusalem: Government of Palestine.
- Morris, B. (2004). Birth of the Palestinian Refugee Problem Revisited. Cambridge University Press. ISBN 0-521-00967-7.
- Palmer, E.H. (1881). The Survey of Western Palestine: Arabic and English Name Lists Collected During the Survey by Lieutenants Conder and Kitchener, R. E. Transliterated and Explained by E.H. Palmer. Committee of the Palestine Exploration Fund.
- Robinson, E.; Smith, E. (1841). Biblical Researches in Palestine, Mount Sinai and Arabia Petraea: A Journal of Travels in the year 1838. Vol. 2. Boston: Crocker & Brewster.
- Robinson, E.; Smith, E. (1841). Biblical Researches in Palestine, Mount Sinai and Arabia Petraea: A Journal of Travels in the year 1838. Vol. 3. Boston: Crocker & Brewster.
- Röhricht, R. (1893). (RRH) Regesta regni Hierosolymitani (MXCVII-MCCXCI) (in Latin). Berlin: Libraria Academica Wageriana.
- Stillman, Yedida Kalfon (1979). Palestinian Costume and Jewelry. Albuquerque: University of New Mexico Press. ISBN 0-8263-0490-7. (A catalog of the Museum of International Folk Art (MOIFA) at Santa Fe's collection of Palestinian clothing and jewelry.)
