= Tel Lachish =

Biblical city and an archeological site in Israel

Lachish
- תל לכיש (Hebrew)
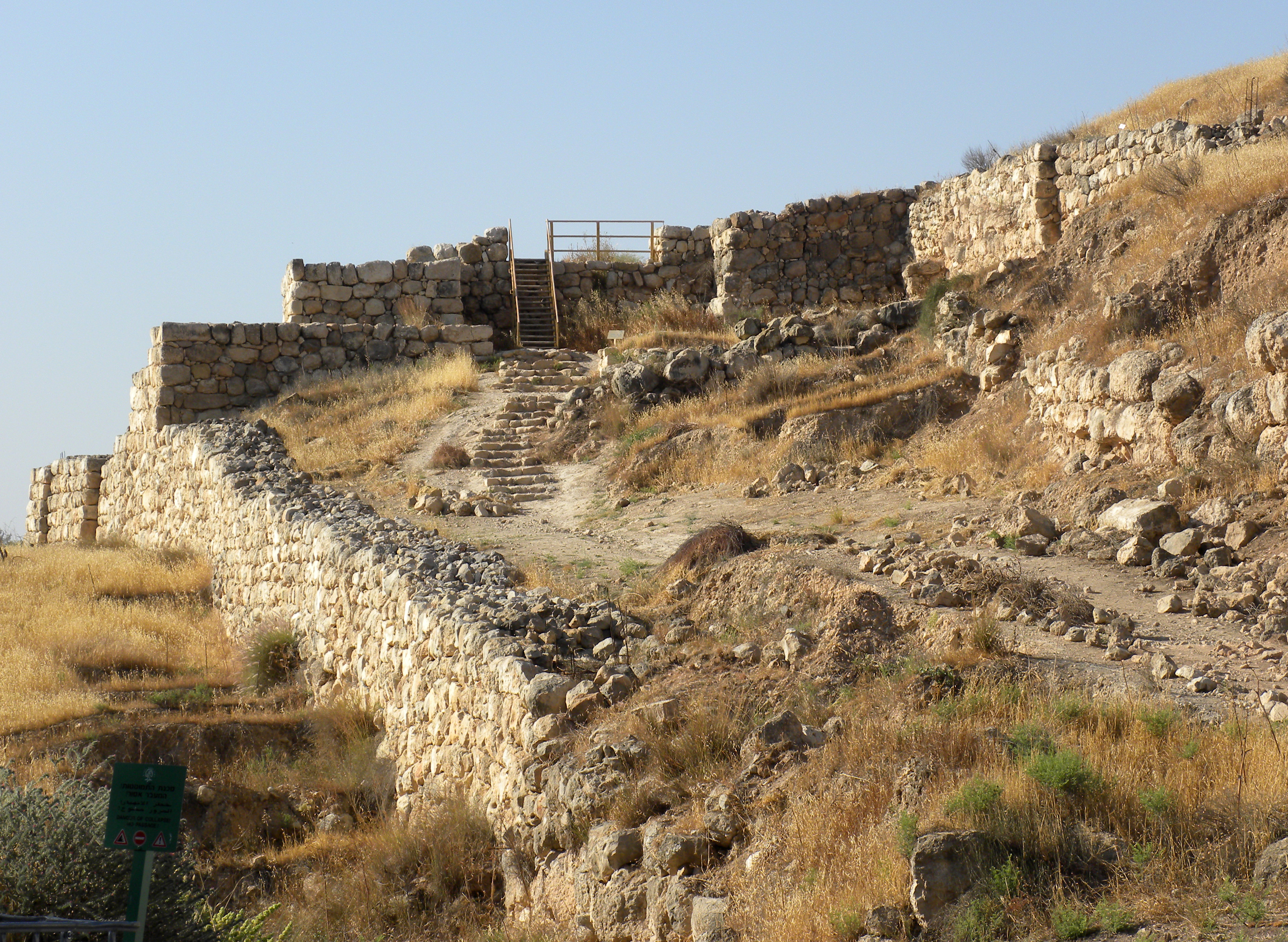
- Main gate of Lachish

- Location within Israel
- 31°33′54″N 34°50′56″E
- Type: Settlement
- Periods: Bronze Age, Iron Age
- Cultures: Canaanite, Israelite, Judahite
- Location: Southern District, Israel
- Region: Shephelah
- Part of: Canaan, Kingdom of Judah
- Grid position: 135/108 PAL

History
- Abandoned: 587 BCE
- Event: Siege of Lachish (701 BCE)

Site notes
- Area: 20 ha (49 acres)
- Excavation dates: 1932–1938, 1966, 1968, 1973–1994, 2013–2016
- Archaeologists: James Leslie Starkey, Olga Tufnell, Yohanan Aharoni, David Ussishkin, Yosef Garfinkel
- Condition: Ruined
- Owner: Public
- Public access: Yes

Lachish (Hebrew: לכיש, romanized: Lāḵîš; Koine Greek: Λαχίς; Latin: Lachis) was an ancient Canaanite and later Israelite city in the Shephelah ("lowlands") region of Canaan on the south bank of the Lakhish River. The current tell by that name, known as Tel Lachish (Hebrew: תל לכיש) or Tell el-Duweir (تل الدوير), has been identified with Lachish. Today, it is an Israeli national park operated and maintained by the Israel Nature and Parks Authority. It lies near the present-day moshav of Lakhish, which was named in honor of the ancient city.

Lachish was first mentioned in the Amarna letters (dated to the mid-14th century BCE) when it was a significant Canaanite city-state referred to as Lakisha. There is clear archeological evidence for (one or two) violent destruction(s) at Lachish in the late 13th/early 12th century BCE, but there is no historical evidence conclusive about the perpetrators with potential theories discussing internal Canaanite conflict, the Sea Peoples, people from the Habiru group or others. In the Book of Joshua (written around 600-700 BCE), Lachish is cited as one of the cities conquered by the Israelites for joining the league against the Gibeonites (Joshua 10:31–33). According to the Hebrew Bible, the territory was later assigned to the tribe of Judah according to Joshua 15:39 and may have become part of the united Kingdom of Israel. Lachish emerged as one of the most important cities in the Kingdom of Judah, second only to the capital, Jerusalem.

Lachish is best known for its siege and conquest by the Neo-Assyrian Empire in 701 BCE, an event famously depicted on the Lachish reliefs, which can be seen today in the British Museum. According to the Book of Jeremiah, Lachish and Azekah were the last two Judean cities to fall to the Neo-Babylonian Empire before the conquest of Jerusalem according to Jeremiah 34:7. One of the Lachish letters, written in 597–587 BCE, warns of the impending Neo-Babylonian destruction. It reads: "Let my lord know that we are watching over the beacon of Lachish, according to the signals which my lord gave, for Azekah is not seen." This pottery inscription can be seen at the Israel Museum in Jerusalem. The siege ramp at Lachish, designed for deploying battering rams against the city during the Neo-Assyrian siege, is the oldest known in the world and the sole example found in the ancient Near East.

== History ==
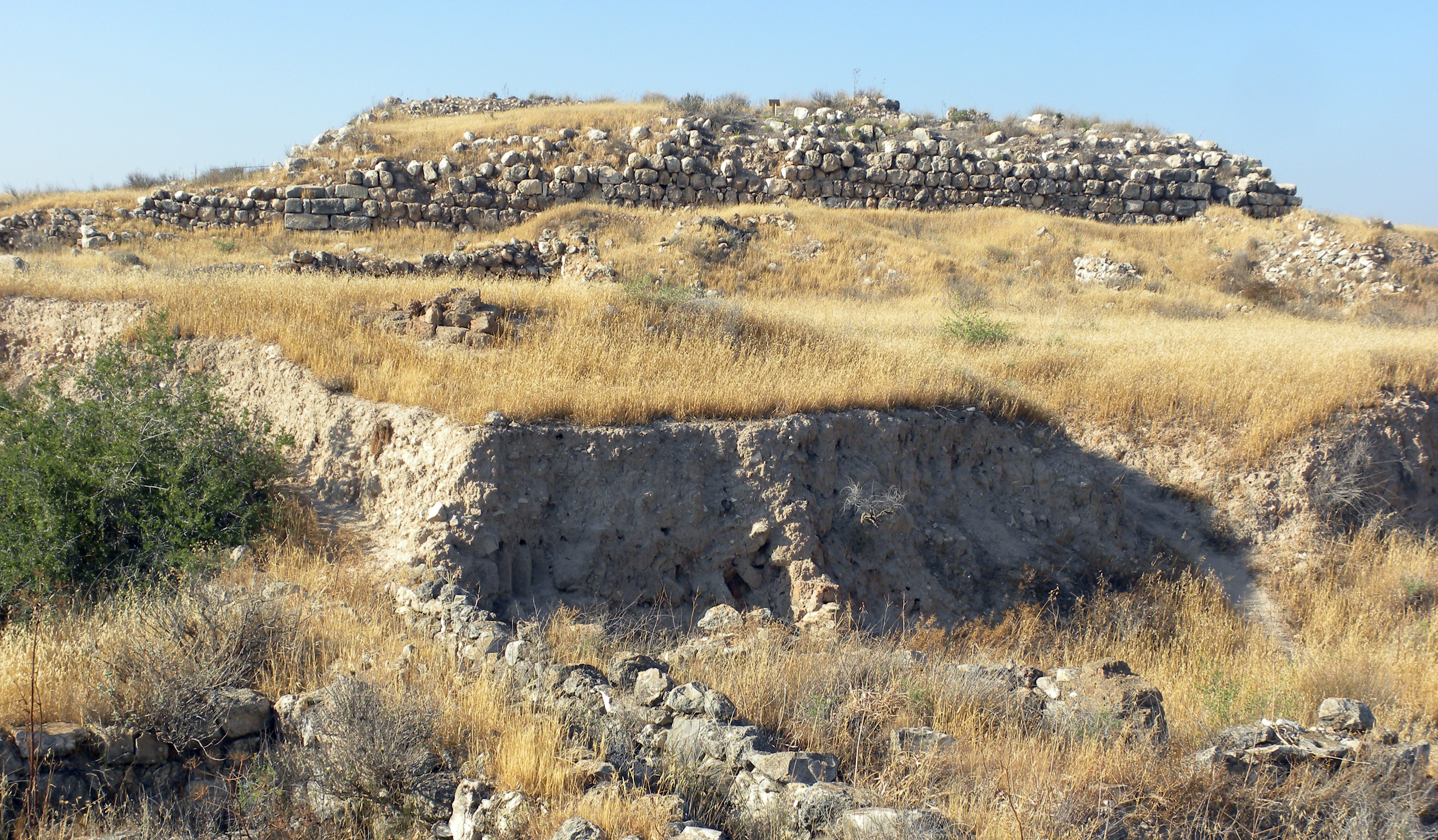
Commander's palace

=== Neolithic ===
Occupation at the site of Lachish began during the Pottery Neolithic period (5500–4500 BCE). Flint tools from that period have been found.

=== Chalcolithic ===
During the Chalcolithic (c. 4500-3800/3500 BCE), Lachish had a settlement on the mound as part of the Ghassulian period.

=== Early Bronze ===
Major development began in the Early Bronze IB (3300–3000 BCE). By the end of the Early Bronze IIIA (c. 2750-2500 BCE), Lachish had become a large settlement. Most of the recovered pottery is of Khirbet Kerak Ware. EBA mound levels not properly excavated.

In Early Bronze IIIB (c. 2500-2350 BCE), drier climatic conditions led to an urban crisis in the Southern Levant and by Early Bronze IV (c. 2350-2000 BCE) severe drought events caused many sites to become abandoned.

=== Middle Bronze (Levels VIII–IX) ===
The MBA period has not been extensively excavated at the site. During the Middle Bronze (2020/2000–1550 BCE), the settlement developed.

In the Middle Bronze I (2000-1820 BCE), the mound was resettled. Remains of a cult place and an assemblage of votive cultic vessels were found in Area D.

In the Middle Bronze IIA, the development continued.

- Level IX (MB IIB)
- Level VIII (MB IIC; Hyksos period) with mudbrick fortress and palace. Destroyed.
- Short-lived phase of squattered before LBA re-establishment.

==== Hyksos period ====
In the Middle Bronze IIB-C (1630-1550 BCE), Lachish became a major city in the Southern Levant. An impressive glacis-like structure was constructed around the city, which shaped its present steep slopes and sharp corners. The proposed glacis fronted a city wall built of massive stones. In Area P, a large mudbrick fortress was excavated. Finds from the fortress include 4 scarabs and a number of scarab sealings. These were of "both the local Canaanite MB IIC style and the Hyksos style". Radiocarbon dating produced a date in the mid-16th century BCE. By the end of Middle Bronze IIC the city was destroyed by fire. Some features originally ascribed to the Iron Age by the early excavators have now been redated to the MBA and LBA.

=== Late Bronze Age ===
D21 Z1 V31 Z4 M8 G1 T14 N25
rkjšꜣ
in hieroglyphs
Era: New Kingdom
(1550–1069 BC)

In the Late Bronze Age (1550–1200 BCE), Lachish (Levels VI-VII) was re-established and developed slowly, eventually becoming one of the large and prosperous cities of the Southern Levant. It is first attested as rkjšꜣ (Lakisha) in a New Kingdom text, the Papyrus Hermitage 1116A.

==== 18th Dynasty ====
- Sparsely populated (LB IB): Fosse Temple I. Destruction.
- Level VII (LB IIA): Fosse Temple II.

Lakhish came under the Eighteenth Dynasty of Egypt, which expelled the Hyksos by Ahmose I and his successors, and established an empire that was most powerful following the military campaigns of Thutmose III.

In the Amarna Period (c. 1350 BCE), Lachish was a city-state and petty kingdom, part of the Egyptian Empire. During a period of political turmoil, it was in conflict with neighboring rivals.

The toponym Lakiša (Akkadian: ^{uru}la-ki-si^{ki}) has seven references in the Amarna Archive. Lakiša appears in five letters sent from Gath (EA 335), Jerusalem (EA 287, 288) and Lachish (EA 328, 329, 332).

- EA 336: Abdi-Ashirta of Gath complained that Lakish was hostile.
- EA 287: The ruler of Jerusalem complains about Lakish, Gezer and Ashkelon providing support to his enemies.

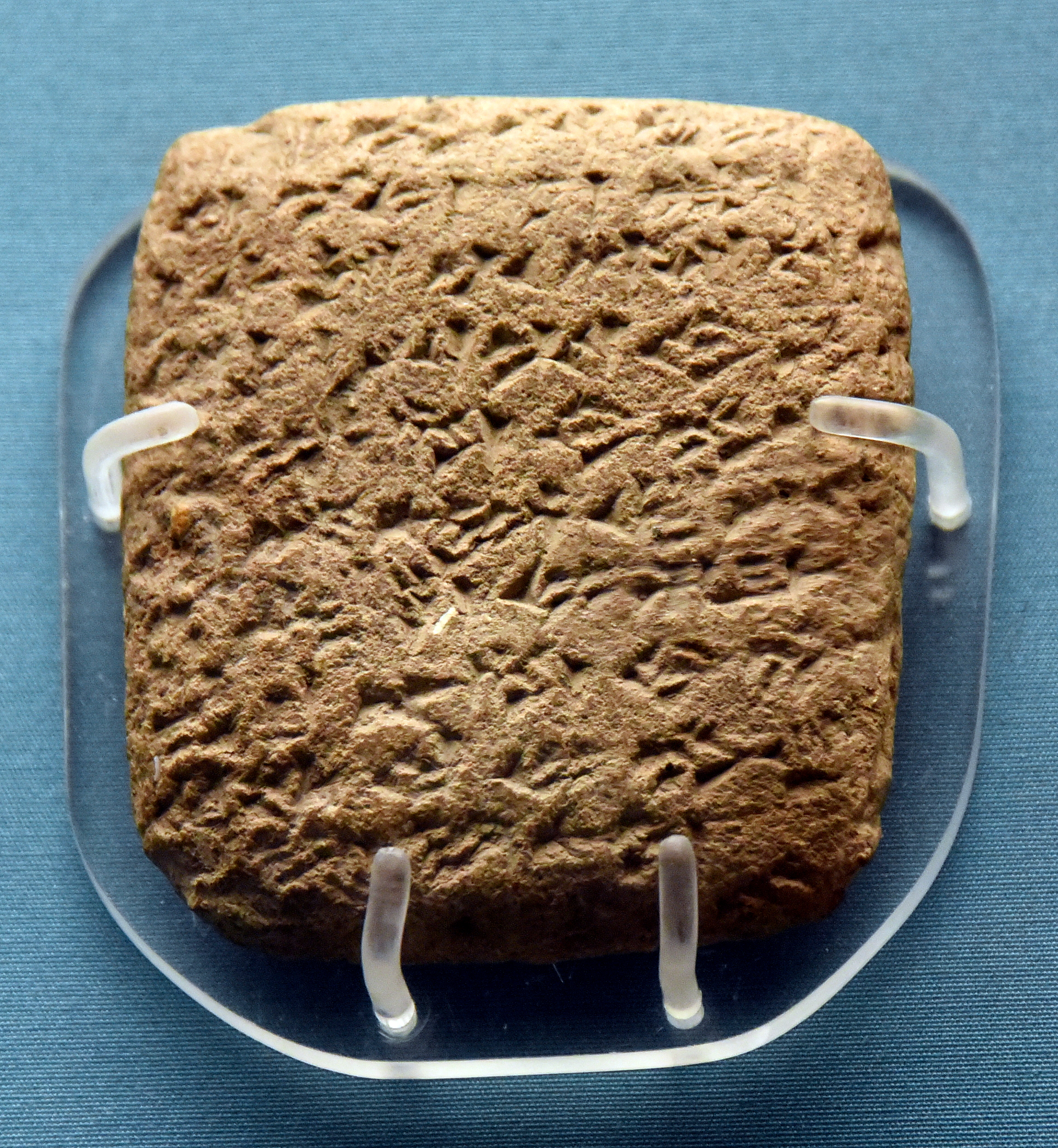
Amarna letter EA 330. A letter from Shipti Ba'al (ruler of Lachish), who reassures the Egyptian pharaoh (Amenhotep III or his son Akhenaten) of his loyalty. 14th century BCE. From Tell el-Amarna, Egypt. British Museum

Ṯipti-Baʿlu/Haddu of Lachish is mentioned five times in the Amarna Archive, in letter from Egypt (EA 333), Lachish (EA 330, 331, 332). He holds the title "Man of Lachish" (Akkadian: LU₂ ^{uru}la-ki-ša^{ki}, petty king, cf. LU-GAL "Great Man, King").

Zimri-Haddu of Lachish is mentioned 5 times in the Amarna Archive, in letters from Egypt (EA 333), Jerusalem (EA 288), Lachish (EA 329) and Unknown location (EA 294). He was eventually killed by his servants allied to the Habiru.

==== 20th Dynasty ====
- Level VI - prosperous, densely populated and unfortified Canaanite city under the Egyptian Empire. Fosse Temple III.

During the early 20th Dynasty of Egypt, at the final part of the Late Bronze, the empire of the New Kingdom of Egypt started to lose its control in the Southern Levant. A bronze object bearing the cartouche of Ramesses III may be associated with the city gate. While Lachish had prospered under Egyptian hegemony, fire destroyed it around 1150 BCE.

Four mass graves were found at the site with over 1500 individuals interred, about half women and children. The tombs themselves dated to the Late Bronze Age but the burials contained few dateable elements so it is uncertain if the burials date to the LBA or later.

=== Iron Age I ===
The Iron Age I (IA I) can be subdivided into IA IA (corresponding with late 20th Dynasty of Egypt) and IA IB (corresponding with 21st Dynasty of Egypt centered on Zaon/Tanis), following the Collapse of the Late Bronze Age and Fall of the Egyptian Empire in the Southern Levant. This was a transitional period from LBA to IA with exceptionally dry climate (3.2 ka event).

Lachish was rebuilt by the Canaanites, who built two cultic places. However, this settlement was soon destroyed by another fire around 1130 BCE (cf. nearby fortified Eglon, Canaan). The site then remained unfortified and sparsely occupied for a long time (Level V).

Continuity or discontinuity? A question has been if the population at Lachish continued from LBA into IA, or if they were replaced (discontinuity). A study showed significant population continuity.

=== Iron Age II (Levels II–IV) ===
==== Kingdom of Yehuda ====
During the 10th and 9th centuries BCE, Lachish was part of the Kingdom of Judah. The previous unfortified settlement may have been destroyed c. 925 BCE by the pharaoh Shoshenq I, founder of the Twenty-second Dynasty of Egypt.

In the first half of the 9th century BCE, under the Judahite kings Asa and Jehoshaphat, Lachish became an important city in the kingdom. It was heavily fortified with massive walls and ramparts. A royal palace was built on a platform in the center of the city. Lachish was the foremost among several towns and fortified strongholds guarding the valleys that lead up to Jerusalem and the interior of the country against enemies who usually approached from the coast.

==== Assyrian period ====
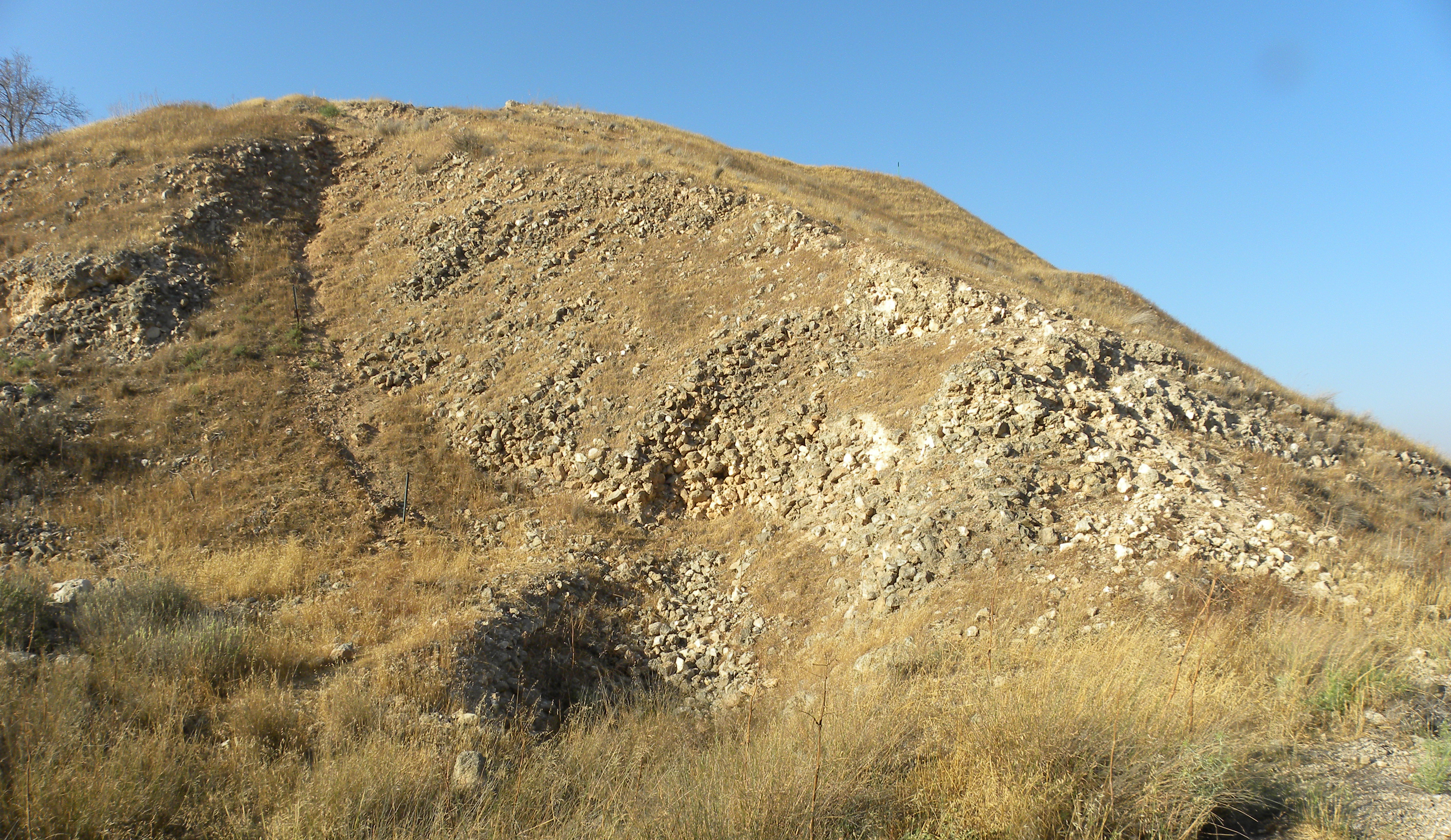
Assyrian siege ramp

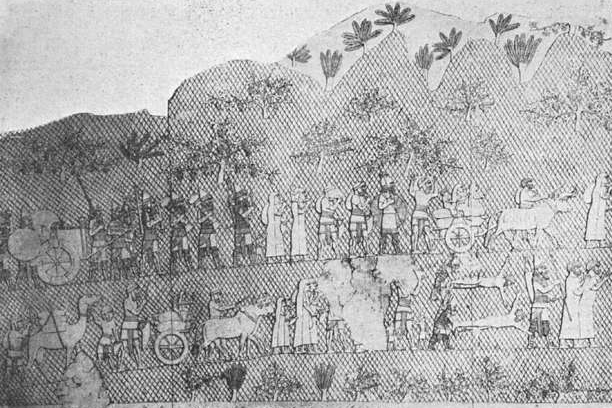
Judean captives being led away into slavery by the Assyrians after the siege of Lachish in 701 BCE. This relief is important for the knowledge of Judean dress.

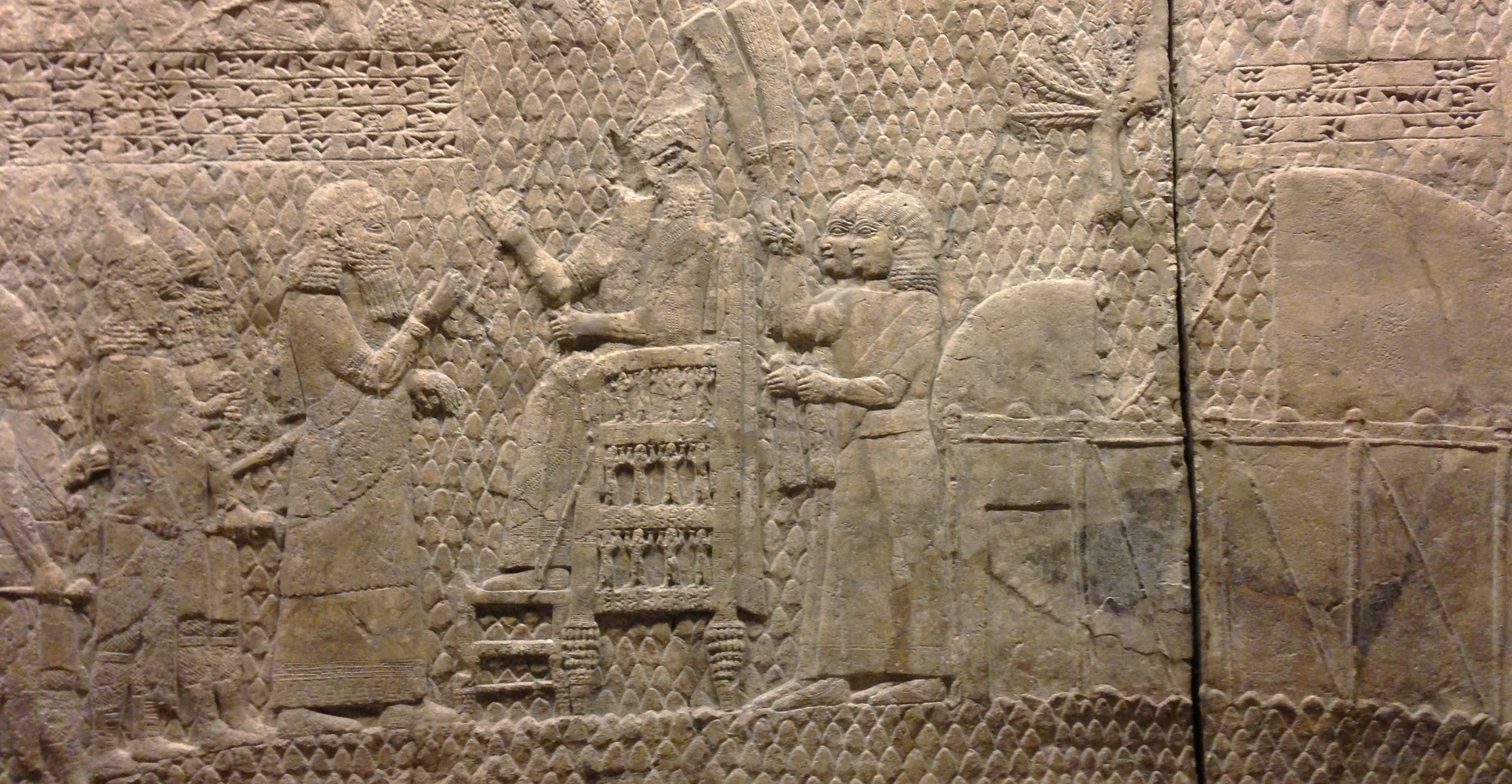
The single inscription which identifies the location depicted in the reliefs reads: "Sennacherib, the mighty king, king of the country of Assyria, sitting on the throne of judgment, before (or at the entrance of) the city of Lachish (Lakhisha). I give permission for its slaughter"

In 701 BCE, during the revolt of Hezekiah, king of Judah, against the Neo-Assyrian Empire, it was besieged and captured by Sennacherib despite the defenders' determined resistance. Some scholars believe that the fall of Lachish occurred during a second campaign in the area by Sennacherib ca. 688 BCE. The site now contains the only remains of an Assyrian siege ramp discovered. Sennacherib later devoted a whole room in his "Palace without a rival", the southwest palace in Nineveh, for artistic representations of the siege on large alabaster slabs, most of which are now on display in the British Museum. They hold depictions of Assyrian siege ramps, battering rams, sappers, and other siege machines and army units, along with Lachish's architecture and its final surrender. Combined with the archaeological finds, they give a good understanding of siege warfare of the period. Modern excavation of the site has revealed that the Assyrians built a stone and dirt ramp up to the level of the Lachish city wall, thereby allowing the soldiers to charge up the ramp and storm the city. Excavations revealed approximately 1,500 skulls in one of the caves near the site, and hundreds of arrowheads on the ramp and at the top of the city wall, indicating the ferocity of the battle. The city occupied an area of 8 hectares (20 acres).

==== Babylonian period ====
Lachish fell to the Neo-Babylonian emperor Nebuchadnezzar II in his campaign against Judah in 586 BCE. The city was finally destroyed in 587 BCE. Residents were exiled as part of the Babylonian captivity. During Babylonian occupation, a large residence was built on the platform that had once supported the Israelite palace.

=== Classical Age ===
==== Persian period ====
In the Persian period, following the Babylonian Exile, some exiled Jews returned to Lachish and built a new city with fortifications (Nehemiah 11:30).

Under the Achaemenid Empire (Level I), a large altar known as the Solar Shrine on the east section of the mound was built. The shrine was abandoned after the area fell in the hands of Alexander the Great. The tell has been unoccupied since then.

== Identification ==
Initially, Lachish was identified by Flinders Petrie with Tell el-Hesi, an identification supported when a relevant cuneiform tablet was found there. The tablet mentions Zimredda of Lachish, a governor of who is known from one of the Amarna Letters (EA 333). The current identification of Tell ed-Duweir as Lachish was first suggested by William F. Albright in 1929 and subsequently accepted by many scholars. This suggestion is strong but circumstantial, based primarily on the site's geographic location, Eusebius's account, the royal reliefs of Sennacherib, archaeological excavations, and an ostracon found there. Israeli archaeologist and historical geographer, Michael Avi-Yonah, thought to place Lachish at the ancient ruin of al-Qubayba, Hebron, near the former Palestinian Arab village by the same name, rather than at Tell ed Duweir. The place has been extensively excavated.

== Archaeological exploration ==
=== Starkey-Tufnell expedition (1932–1939) ===
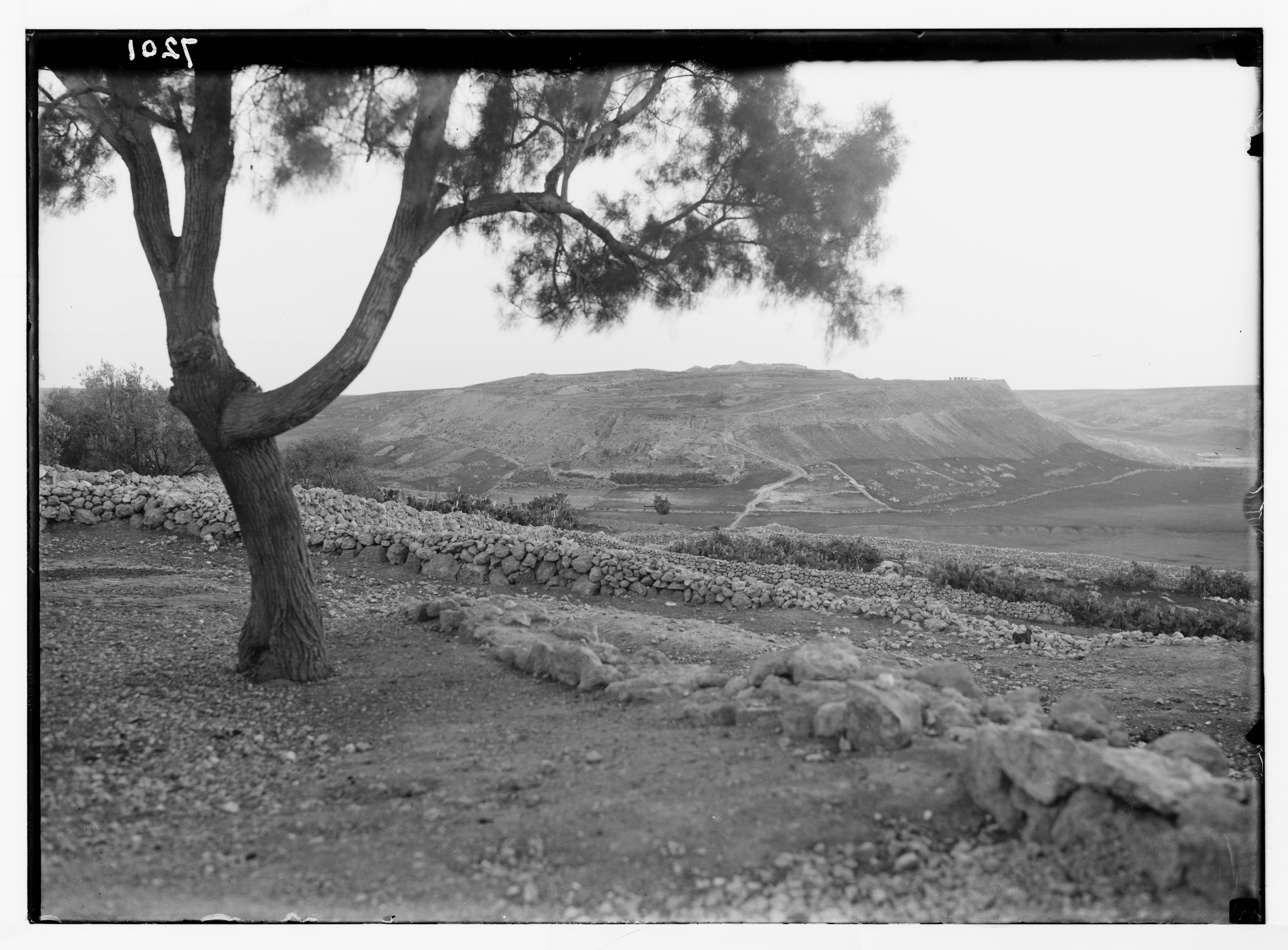
Tell Lachish, 1936

The first expedition at Lachish, then Tell ed-Duweir, from 1932 to 1939, was the Starkey-Tufnell British expedition which included James Leslie Starkey as expedition leader, Olga Tufnell, Gerald Lankester Harding and Charles Inge. It was funded by Charles Marston and Henry Wellcome with the aim of finding the Biblical city of Lachish. They succeeded in finding Lachish, with a "wealth of well-stratified pottery", a "key part of the ceramic corpus of Palestine", and the Lachish letters, "written to the commander of the garrison at Lachish shortly before it fell to the Babylonians in either 589 or 586 B.C."

The mound belonged to residents of al-Qubayba, and the expedition initially rented or the land required for excavation, but the negotiations to acquire the summit stumbled and the government expropriated it in 1934. Based on Palestinian oral histories and intelligence files, Marom and Garfinkel claimed the dispute led to Starkey’s assassination in 1938, while travelling to the opening of the Rockefeller Archaeological Museum in Jerusalem.

Tufnell, Harding and Inge remained for the 1938–1939 season. Tufnell returned to London and over the next two decades, worked at the Institute of Archaeology in London, "sorting, collating, studying and presenting the material found at Lachish". She completed her final publication Lachish IV in 1957. She had already become a Fellow of the Society of Antiquaries of London in 1951.

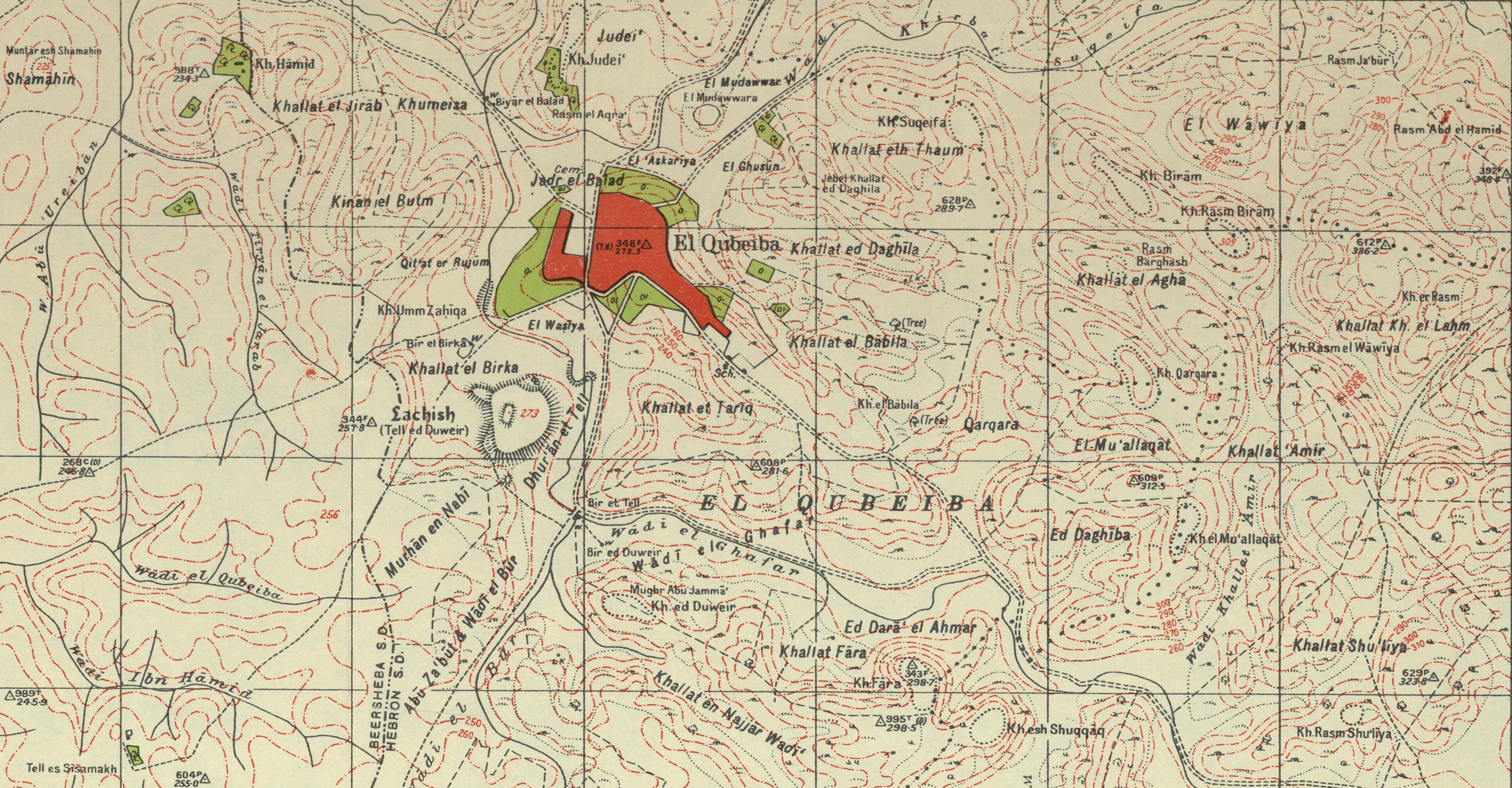
Tel Lachish 1947 (1:20,000)

=== Aharoni expedition (1966, 1968) ===
The second was an Israeli expedition directed by Yohanan Aharoni that took place over two seasons in 1966 and 1968. The dig, which focused mainly on the "Solar Shrine", was worked on behalf of Hebrew University and Tel Aviv University. Aharoni published the findings in his 1975 publication, Investigations at Lachish: The sanctuary and the residency.

=== Ussishkin expedition (1973 to 1994) ===
The third expedition, 1973 until 1994, by a Tel Aviv University Institute of Archaeology and Israel Exploration Society team was led by David Ussishkin. Excavation and restoration work was conducted between 1973 and 1994 by a Tel Aviv University Institute of Archaeology and Israel Exploration Society team led by David Ussishkin. The excavation focused on the Late Bronze (1550–1200 BCE) and Iron Age (1200–587 BCE) levels. The Ussishkin expedition's comprehensive 5-volume report set a new standard in archaeological publication. According to Yosef Garfinkel, "The Starkey-Tufnell and Ussishkin expeditions set new standards in excavation and publication. They revolutionized our understanding of various aspects of Lachish, such as the later history of Judah and the pre-Israelite Late Bronze Age Canaanite city." Excavations of Tel Lachish continued in 2012 under the auspices of Tel Aviv University's Institute of Archaeology, conducted by Nissim Golding-Meir.

A Linear A inscription was also found at the site.

=== Garfinkel expedition (2013) ===
In 2013, a fourth expedition to Lachish was begun under the direction of Yosef Garfinkel, Michael G. Hasel, and Martin G. Klingbeil to investigate the Iron Age history of the site on behalf of the Institute of Archaeology, The Hebrew University of Jerusalem, and the Institute of Archaeology, Southern Adventist University. Other consortium institutions include Virginia Commonwealth University, Oakland University and Korea Biblical Geography Research Institute. The excavations were concentrated in the northeast corner of the site near the location of the Middle Bronze Age gate and fortress. In the topsoil, unstratified, was found a dark blue diorite scarab of the Egyptian New Kingdom period.

In 2014, during the Fourth Expedition to Lachish, led by archaeologist Saar Ganor, a small potsherd with letters from a 12th-century BCE alphabet, was found in the ruins of a Late Bronze Age temple. One researcher called it, a "once in a generation" find.

A fifth expedition, running from 2015 to 2016, was conducted as part of developing the site as a national park. A gate shrine of Level III, destroyed during the Assyrian assault and a toilet installation were found. It has been suggested that the toilet, in a gate shrine, was part of Hezekiah's campaign against idolatry. Two altars in the shrine also had their horns damaged in possible desecration.

The Korean Lachish Excavation Team led by Hong Soon-hwa, reported that they had "uncovered a wide range of 10th century BCE items, from houses with earthenware items and cooking stoves, to animal bones, olive seeds, spearheads, fortress walls and other objects" on July 5, 2017.

Since 2017, the Austro-Israeli excavation is exploring the Middle and Late Bronze Age strata at the site. The project is conducted a joint project of Hebrew University and the Institute for Oriental and European Archaeology of the Austrian Academy of Sciences and is co-directed by Felix Höflmayer and Katharina Streit. The project is funded by the Austrian Science Fund. In 2018 a pottery sherd, dated to the 15th century BCE, was found with alphabetic text. This fills a gap in the development history of alphabetic writing. In 2019 a hieratic ostracon was found, dated to the time of the Egyptian 18th Dynasty. It is described by the excavators as a name list with allocated provisions in Canaanite.

The expedition also uncovered an Iron Age IIA cult room, designated Sanctuary BBE4, containing benches and ritual vessels. In a 2026 study, archaeologists Itamar Weissbein and Yosef Garfinkel interpreted the structure as a local, kin-based sanctuary, pointing to decentralized religious practices in early Judah prior to state-level cultic centralization.

== Select inscriptions ==
=== Inscriptions in Proto-Canaanite ===
As many as 12 purported Proto-Canaanite inscriptions had been discovered at Lachish by 2022. Six were discovered in the Starkey-Tufnell excavations, two during the renewed excavations by Ussishkin, and four in more recent excavations. At least three of the purported inscriptions are likely to have been merely figural pottery designs or pseudo-inscriptions Among the well-known legitimate inscriptions are the Lachish Ewer, Lachish Bowl, the Cypriot Bowl Fragment, and the Ivory Lice Comb.

The few known inscriptions from the Late Bronze Age, the 13th and part of the 12th century BCE, show a certain "linearisation" when compared to the earlier, Proto-Sinaitic script, but the undergone process is not yet understood.

==== Ivory lice comb (18th century BCE) ====
In 2016, an inscribed elephant ivory lice comb dating to about 1700 BCE was found at Lachish during the Garfinkel excavations. The find is purported to bear the oldest sentence found written in the early Canaanite script. In the editio princeps, the authors suggest to read 15 letters, constituent of a wish to eradicate lice. They offer the following translation: "May this tusk root out the lice of the hai[r and the] beard."

==== Cypriot bowl fragment (15th century BCE) ====
In 2018, an inked rim fragment of a Cypriot White Slip II milk bowl was discovered, dating to the mid fifteenth century BCE. The inscription consists of nine letters. The authors of the editio princeps offer to read two words on the inscription, ʿbd meaning "servant, slave" and npt meaning "honey, nectar." The inscription is, however, too fragmentary to suggest much else but represents one of the earliest examples of alphabetic writing from the Levant.

==== Lachish ewer (13th century BCE) ====
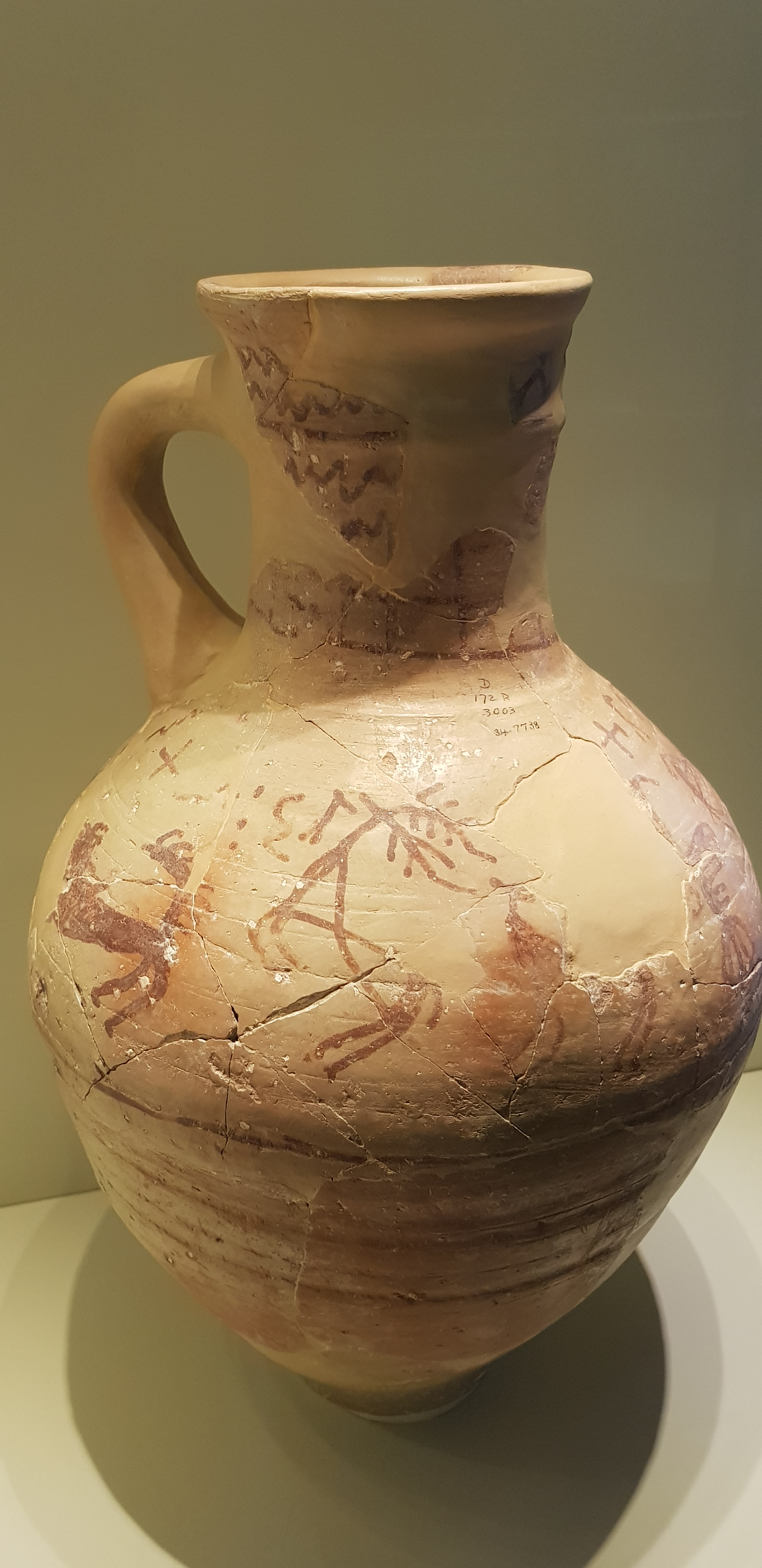
The Lachish ewer

Inscribed ewer, found in the Fosse Temple III at Level VII, which dates it back to the 13th century BCE.

==== Lachish bowl (13th century BCE) ====
The Lachish bowl was discovered in Tomb 527 at Lachish Level VII, dated to the 13th century BCE.

==== Lachish bowl fragment (12th century BCE) ====
The Lachish bowl fragment was discovered in a Level VII context and dated to the 12th century BCE.

==== Lachish jar sherd (12th century BCE) ====
The "Lachish jar sherd", found in 2014 in a stratigraphic context (Level VI) which allows dating it to around 1130 BCE, contains a fragmentary early alphabetic inscription. The remaining nine letters, nine of them in three lines, are perfectly discernable, but they cannot be convincingly combined into words and the words into a text. The undecipherable inscription still is of great palaeographic interest, given the scarcity of Late Bronze Age West Semitic inscriptions found in controlled excavations, as it adds to our knowledge about the evolution of alphabetic script.

==== Inscribed storage jar sherd (12th century BCE) ====
During the 2025 excavation season of the Seventh Expedition to Tel Lachish, archaeologists uncovered an inscribed storage jar shoulder. The fragmentary red-ink inscription is written in standardized Linear Canaanite script with cursive features suggestive of a scribe accustomed to writing with ink on perishable materials. The surviving letters preserve the Canaanite personal name Bʿlšlṭ, meaning "Ba'al Rules" or "Ba'al is the ruler". This finding predates what was considered the most ancient known instances of the script by about a century.

=== Inscriptions in Paleo-Hebrew ===
The first archaeological expedition, the Starkey-Starkey-Tufnell (1932–1939) uncovered the Lachish letters, which were "written to the commander of the garrison at Lachish shortly before it fell to the Babylonians in either 589 or 586 B.C." The Hebrew letters were written on pieces of pottery, so-called ostraca. Eighteen letters were found in 1935 and three more in 1938, all written in Paleo-Hebrew script. They were from the latest occupational level immediately before the Babylonian siege of 587 BCE. At the time, they formed the only known corpus of documents in classical Hebrew that had come down to us outside of the Hebrew Bible.

==== LMLK seals ====
Another contribution to Biblical archaeology from excavations at Lachish are the LMLK seals, which were stamped on the handles of a particular form of ancient storage jar, meaning "of the king". More of these artifacts were found at this site (over 400; Ussishkin, 2004, pp. 2151–2159) than any other place in Israel (Jerusalem remains in second place with more than 300). Most of them were collected from the surface during Starkey's excavations, but others were found in Level 1 (Persian and Greek era), Level 2 (period preceding Babylonian conquest by Nebuchadnezzar), and Level 3 (period preceding Assyrian conquest by Sennacherib). It is thanks to the work of David Ussishkin's team that eight of these stamped jars were restored, thereby demonstrating lack of relevance between the jar volumes (which deviated as much as 5 gallons or 12 litres), and also proving their relation to the reign of Biblical king Hezekiah. Ussishkin observed that "The renewed excavations confirmed Tufnell's suggestion that Level III had been destroyed in 701 BCE. All the royal storage jars, stamped and unstamped alike, date to the reign of Hezekiah, to shortly before the Assyrian conquest."

=== Fake Darius inscription ===
In 2022, Eylon Levy, an adviser to the Israeli president Isaac Herzog, found an inscribed potsherd while visiting Tel Lachish. The sherd bore an Aramaic inscription that read "Year 24 of Darius," which if genuine would have indicated a date of 498 BCE. The find appeared significant, because it would have been the first time that an inscription bearing the name of Darius the Great had been found in the territory of Yehud Medinata, then a province of the Achaemenid Empire ruled by Darius. Levy reported it to Saar Ganor of the Israel Antiquities Authority—the director of excavations at Tel Lachish—who concluded after laboratory testing that the sherd was authentic, probably a receipt for goods received or shipped. This led to widespread coverage of the find in the international press.

Subsequently, the Israel Antiquities Authority issued a statement saying that the sherd was not authentic and had been created by an expert demonstrating inscription techniques to her students. She had come forward after the publicity surrounding the find, and explained she had used an original scrap of worthless pottery from the site and engraved the writing on it. She then discarded it at the tourist section.

== Gallery ==
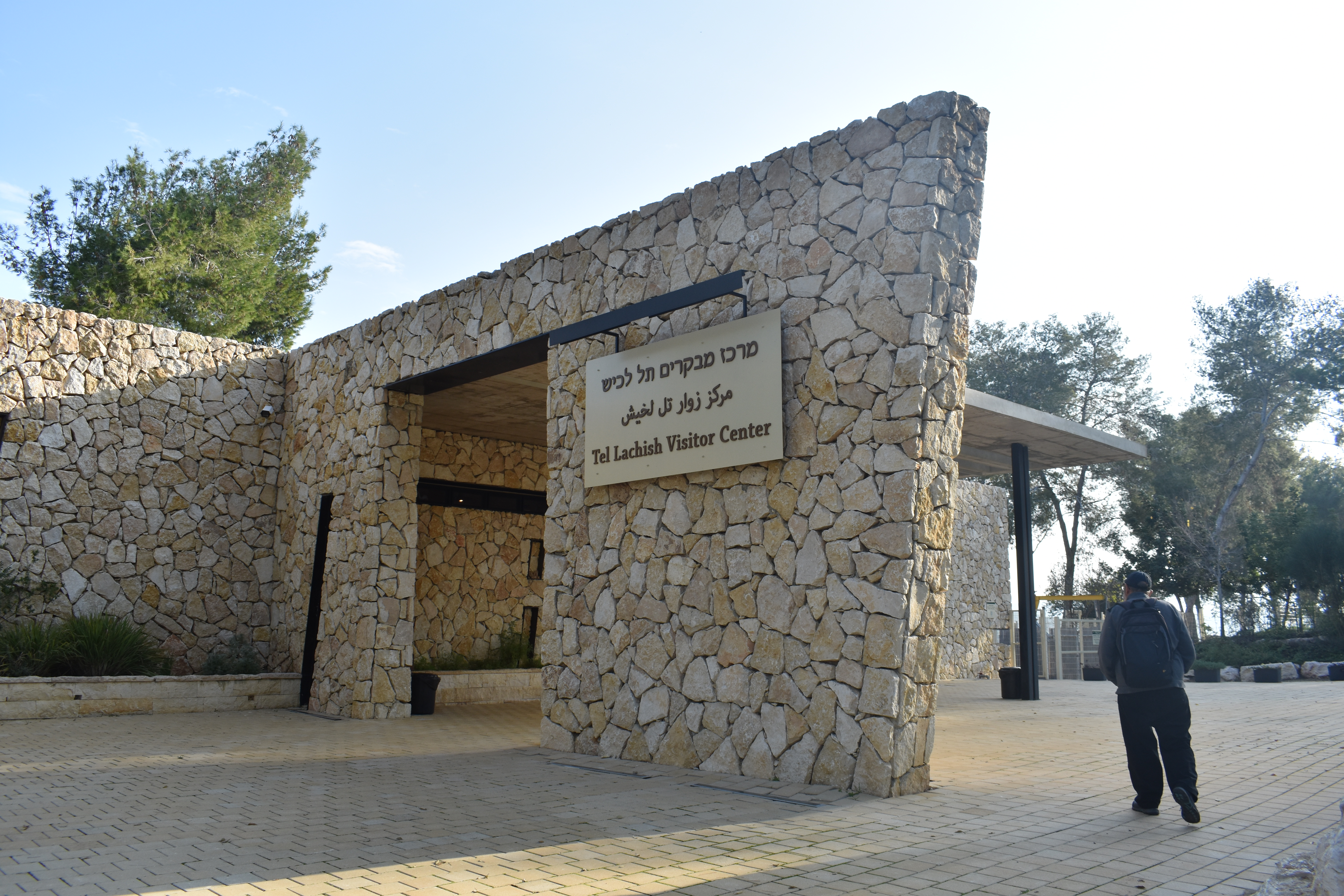
Entrance to Park

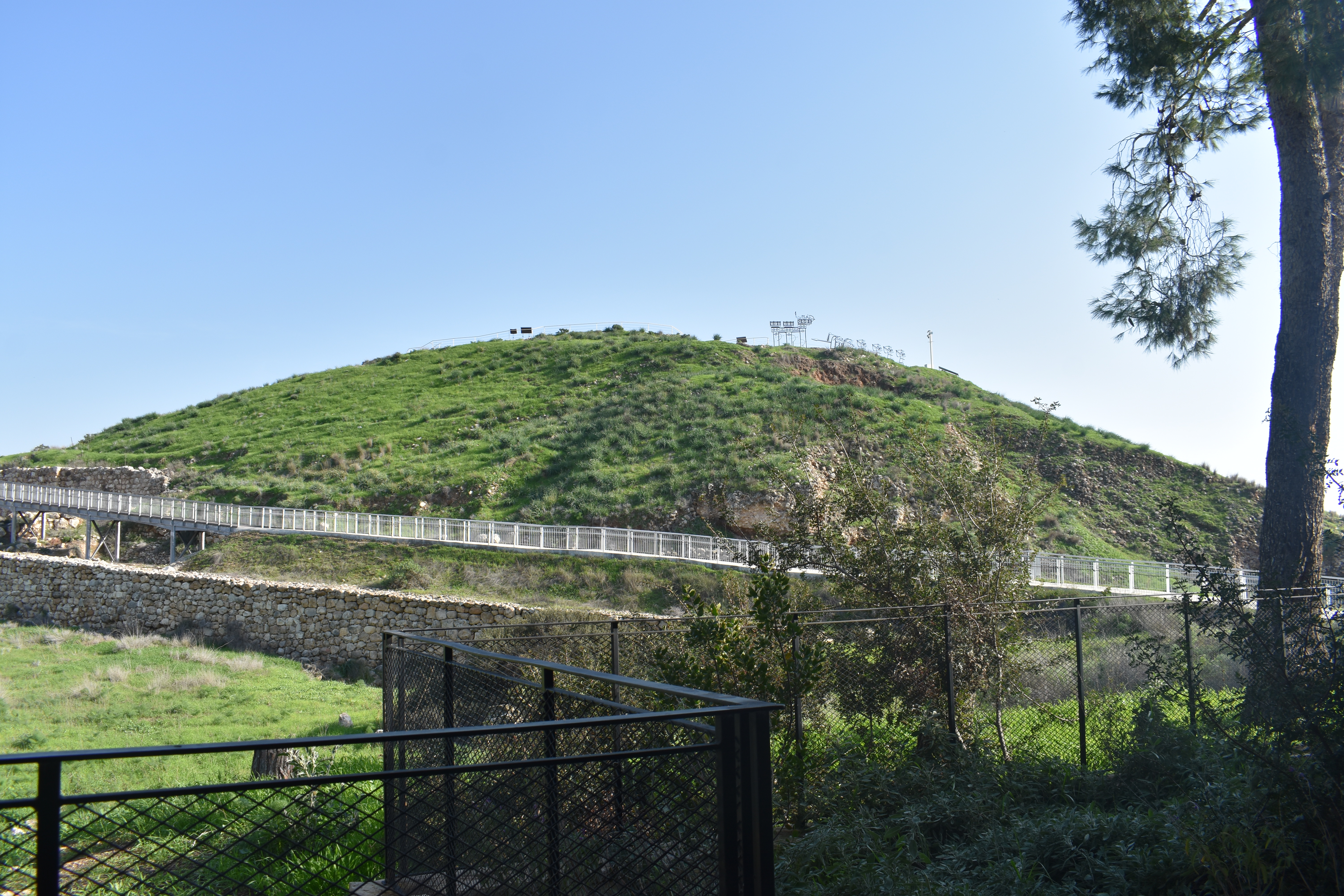
Siege ramp

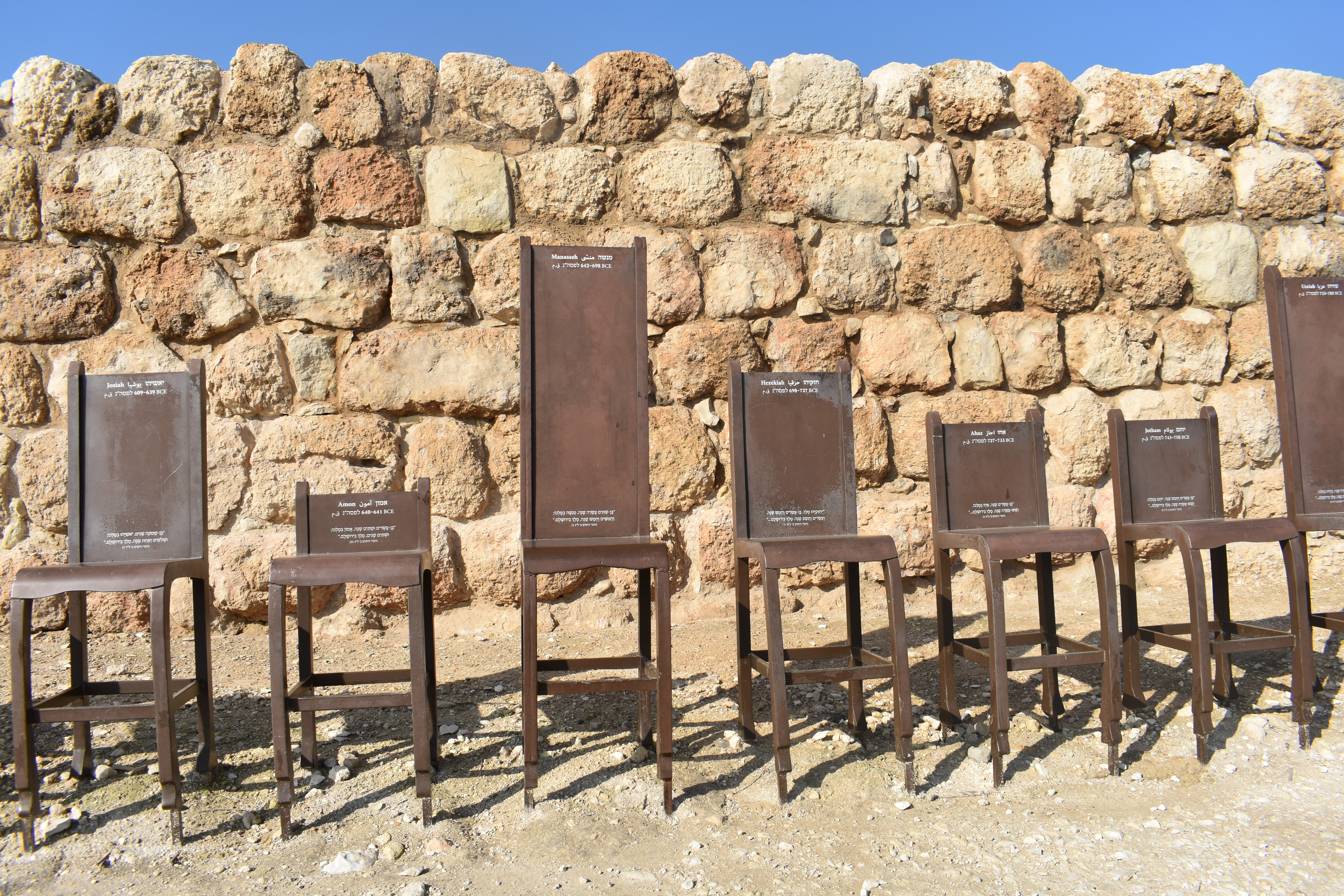
The Thrones of Yehuda at Tel Lachish

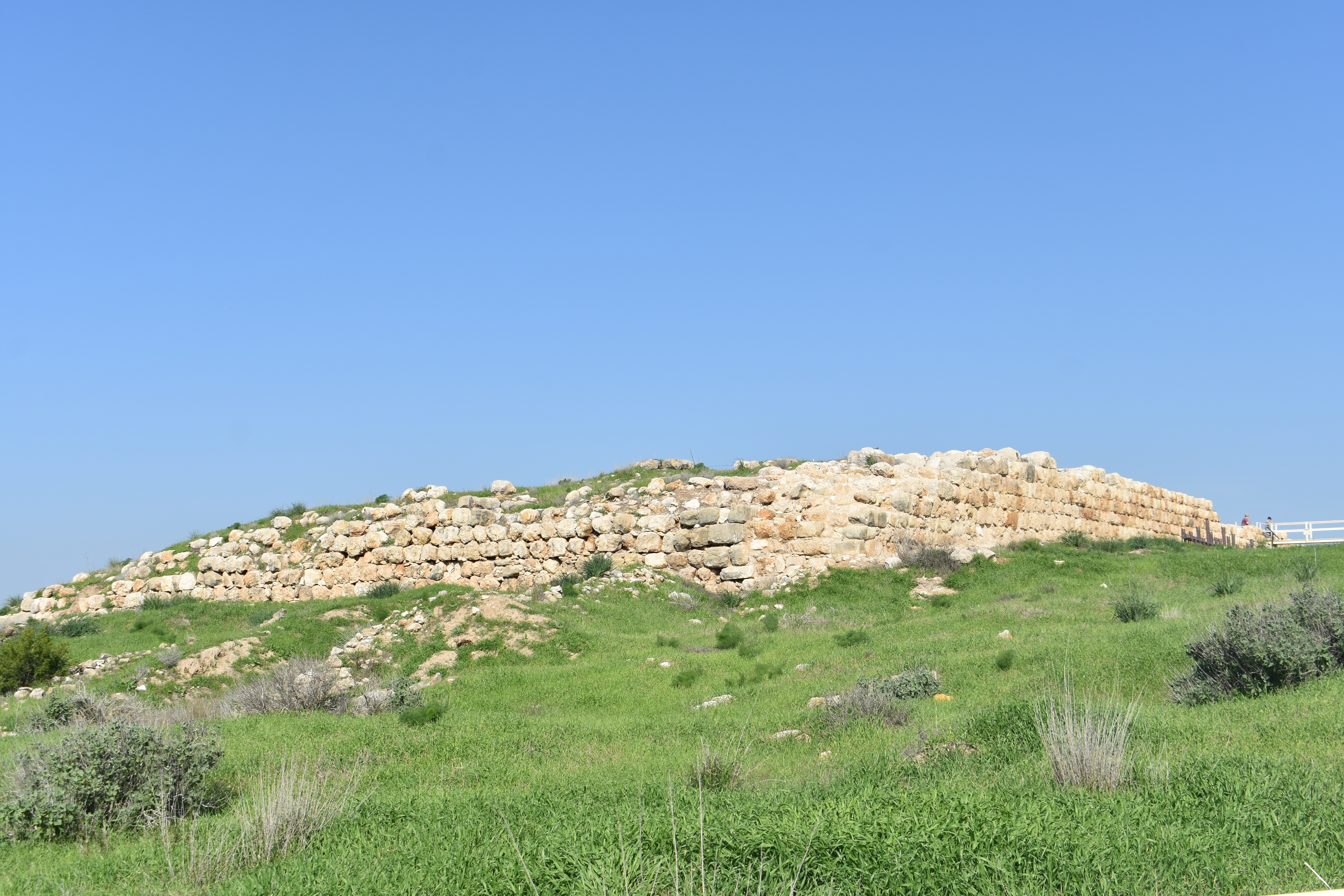
Remains of the Palace

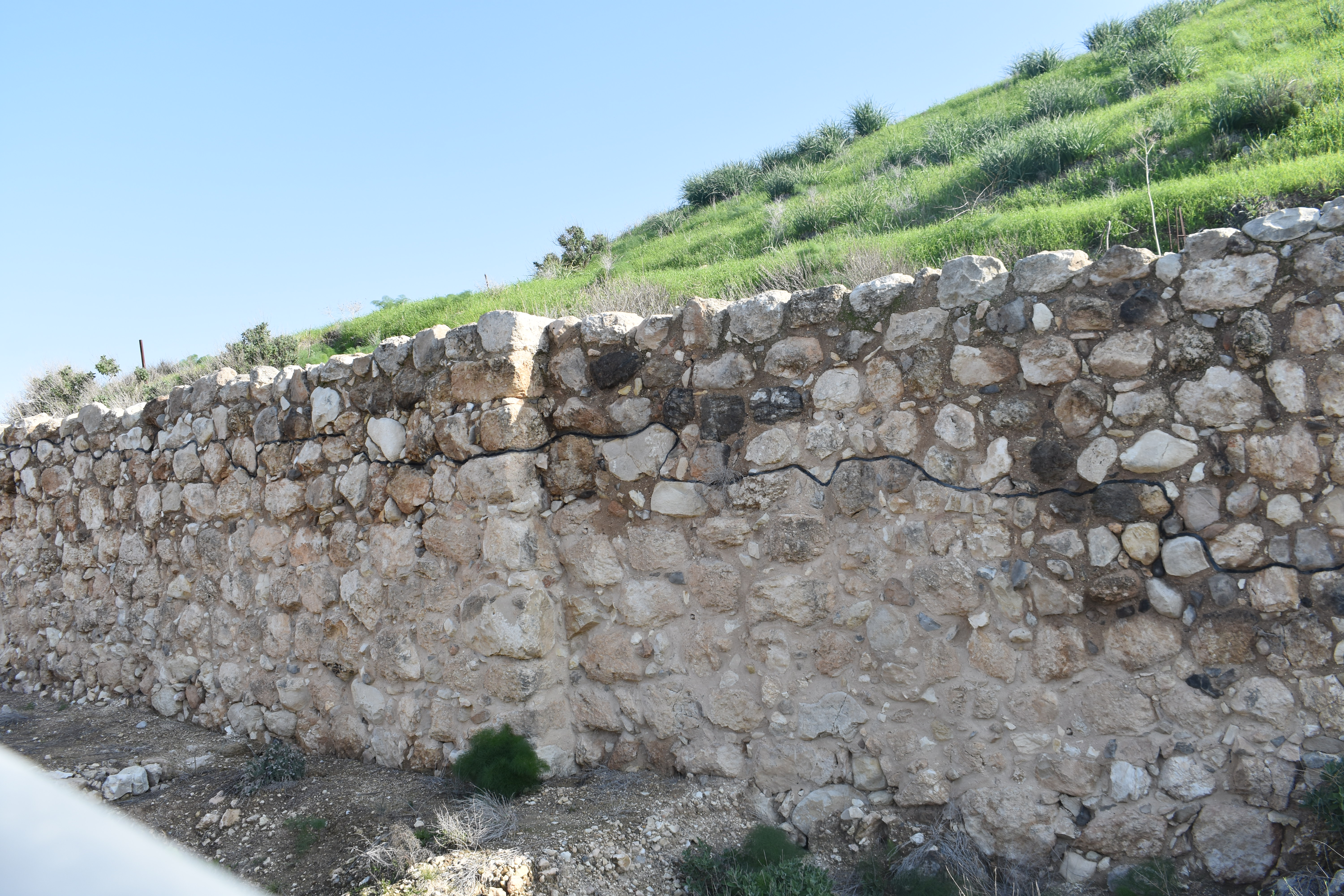
Original and reconstructed wall

== See also ==
- Archaeology of Israel
- List of cities of the ancient Near East
- List of inscriptions in biblical archaeology
- Lachish relief
- Amarna letter EA 330
- LMLK seal
