= Lachish letters =

Late Biblical Hebrew (c. 590 BCE) inscriptions on clay sherds

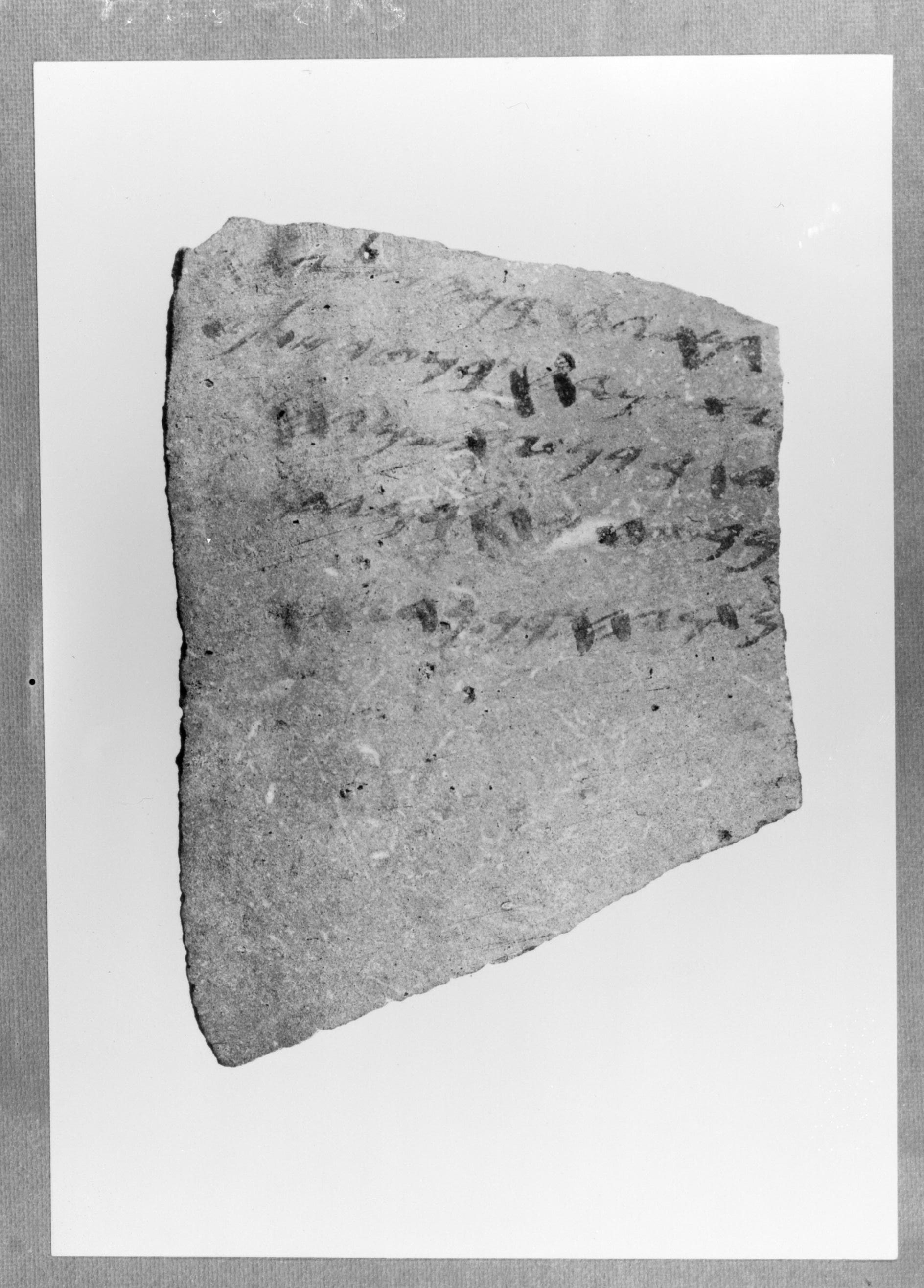
- Material: Clay ostraca
- Writing: Phoenician script / Paleo-Hebrew script
- Created: c. 590 BC
- Discovered: 1935
- Discovered by: James Starkey
- Present location: British Museum and Israel Museum
- Identification: ME 125701 to ME 125707, ME 125715a, IAA 1938.127 and 1938.128

The Lachish Letters are a series of letters written in carbon ink containing ancient Israelite inscriptions in Ancient Hebrew on clay ostraca. The letters were discovered at the excavations at Lachish (Tel Lachish).

The ostraca were discovered by British archaeologist James Leslie Starkey in January–February 1935, during the third campaign of the Wellcome excavations. They were published in 1938 by Professor Harry Torczyner (name later changed to Naftali Herz Tur-Sinai) and have been studied extensively since then. Seventeen of them are currently located in the British Museum in London; a smaller number (including Letter 6) are on permanent display at the Rockefeller Museum in East Jerusalem. The primary inscriptions are known as KAI 192–199.

== Interpretation ==
The individual ostraca probably come from the same broken clay pot and were most likely written in a short period of time. They were written to Yaush (or Ya'osh), possibly the commanding officer at Lachish, from Hoshaiah (Hoshayahu), a military officer stationed in a city close to Lachish (possibly Mareshah). In the letters, Hoshaiah defends himself to Yaush regarding a letter he either was or was not supposed to have read. The letters also contain informational reports and requests from Hoshaiah to his superior. The letters were probably written shortly before Lachish fell to the Babylonian army of King Nebuchadnezzar II in 588/6 BC during the reign of Zedekiah, king of Judah (ref. Jeremiah 34:7).

Letter Number 1

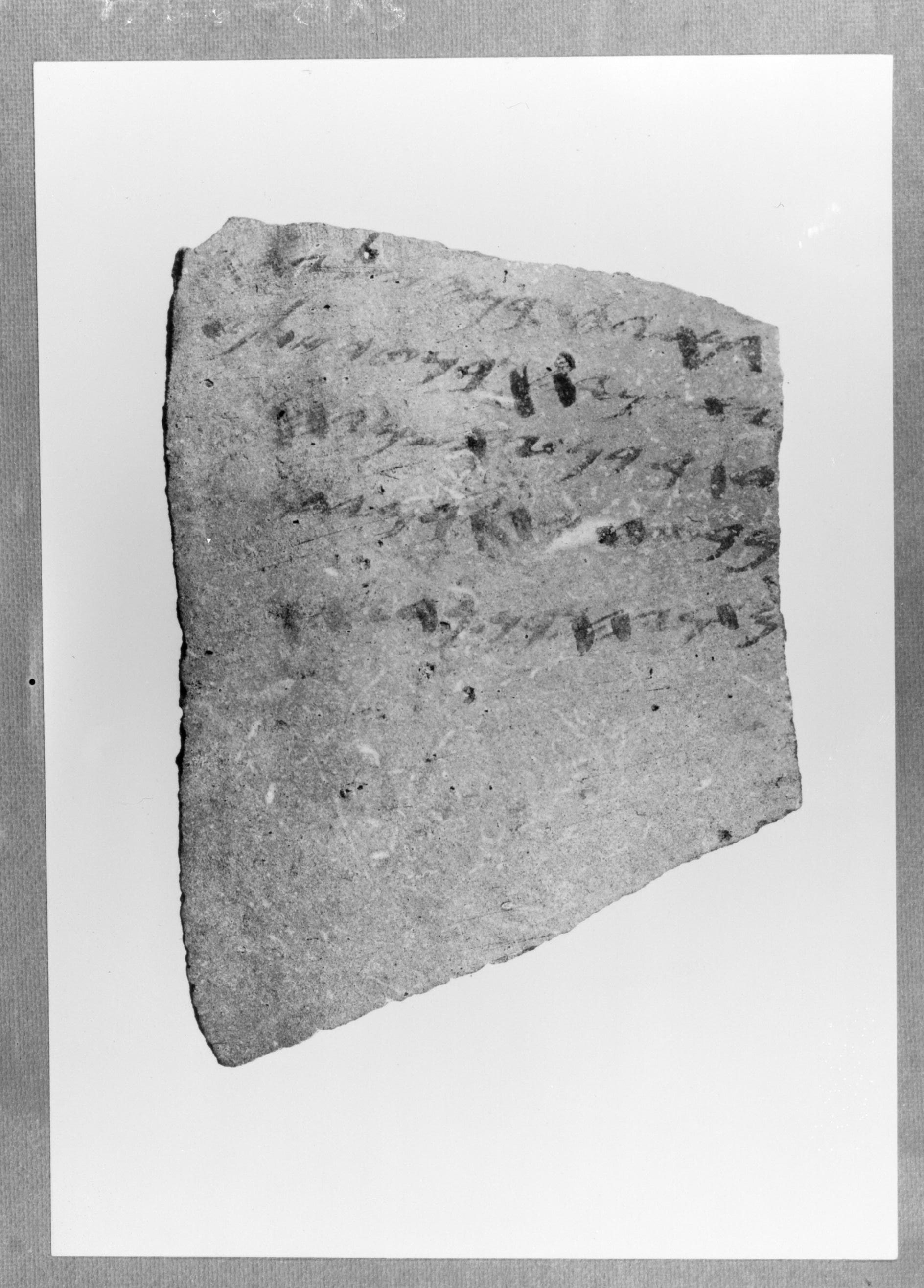

Gemariah son of Hissilyahu, Jaazaniah son of Tobshillem, Hageb son of Jaazaniah, Mibtahyahu son of Jeremiah, Mattaniah son of Neriah.

Letter Number 2

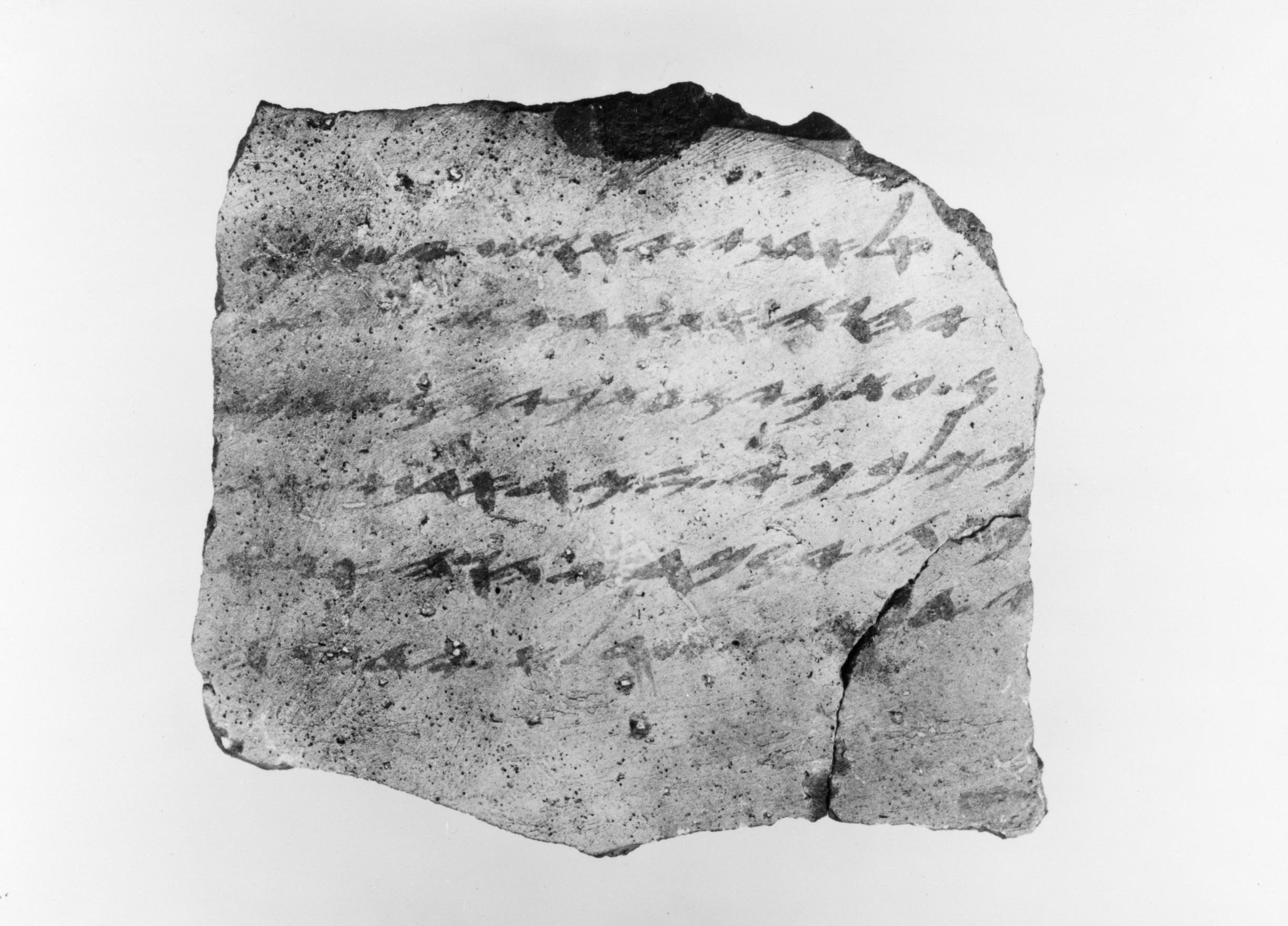

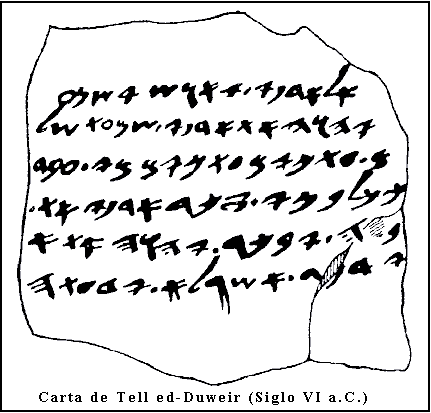

To my lord, Ya'ush, may YHWH cause my lord to hear tiding(s) of peace today, this very day! Who is your servant, a dog, that my lord remembered his [se]rvant? May YHWH make known(?) to my [lor]d a matter of which you do not know.

Letter Number 3

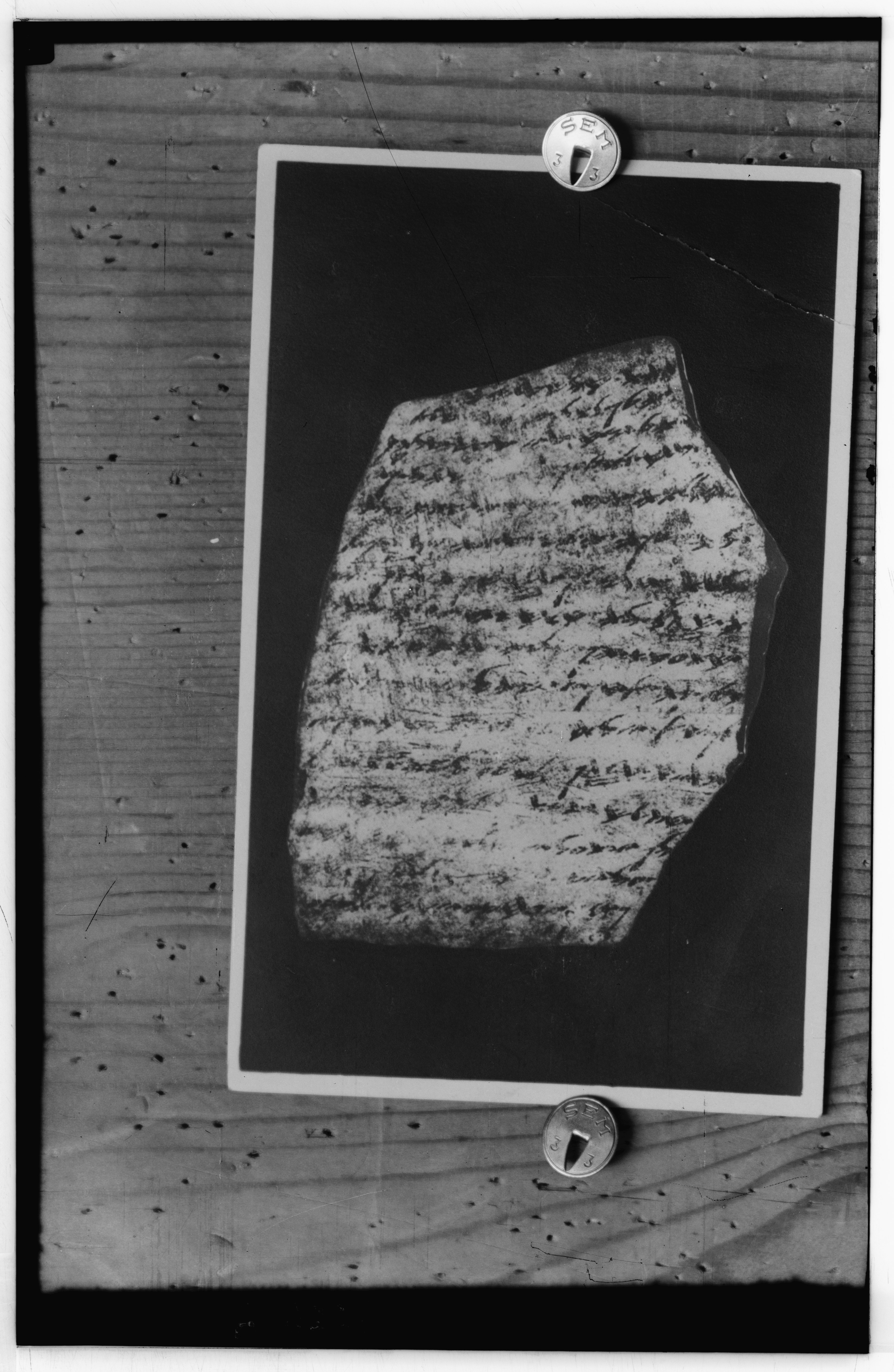

Your servant, Hoshaiah, sent to inform my lord, Ya'ush: May YHWH cause my lord to hear tidings of peace and tidings of good. And now, open the ear of your servant concerning the letter which you sent to your servant last evening because the heart of your servant is ill since your sending it to your servant. And inasmuch as my lord said "Don't you know how to read a letter?" As YHWH lives if anyone has ever tried to read me a letter! And as for every letter that comes to me, if I read it. And furthermore, I will grant it as nothing. And to your servant it has been reported saying: The commander of the army Coniah son of Elnatan, has gone down to go to Egypt and he sent to commandeer Hodaviah son of Ahijah and his men from here. And as for the letter of Tobiah, the servant of the king, which came to Shallum, the son of Jaddua, from the prophet, saying, "Be on guard!" your ser[va]nt is sending it to my lord.

Notes: This ostracon is approximately fifteen centimeters tall by eleven centimeters wide and contains twenty-one lines of writing. The front side has lines one through sixteen; the back side has lines seventeen through twenty-one. This ostracon is particularly interesting because of its mentions of Konyahu, who has gone down to Egypt, and the prophet. For possible biblical connections according to Torczyner, reference Jeremiah 26:20–23.

Letter Number 4

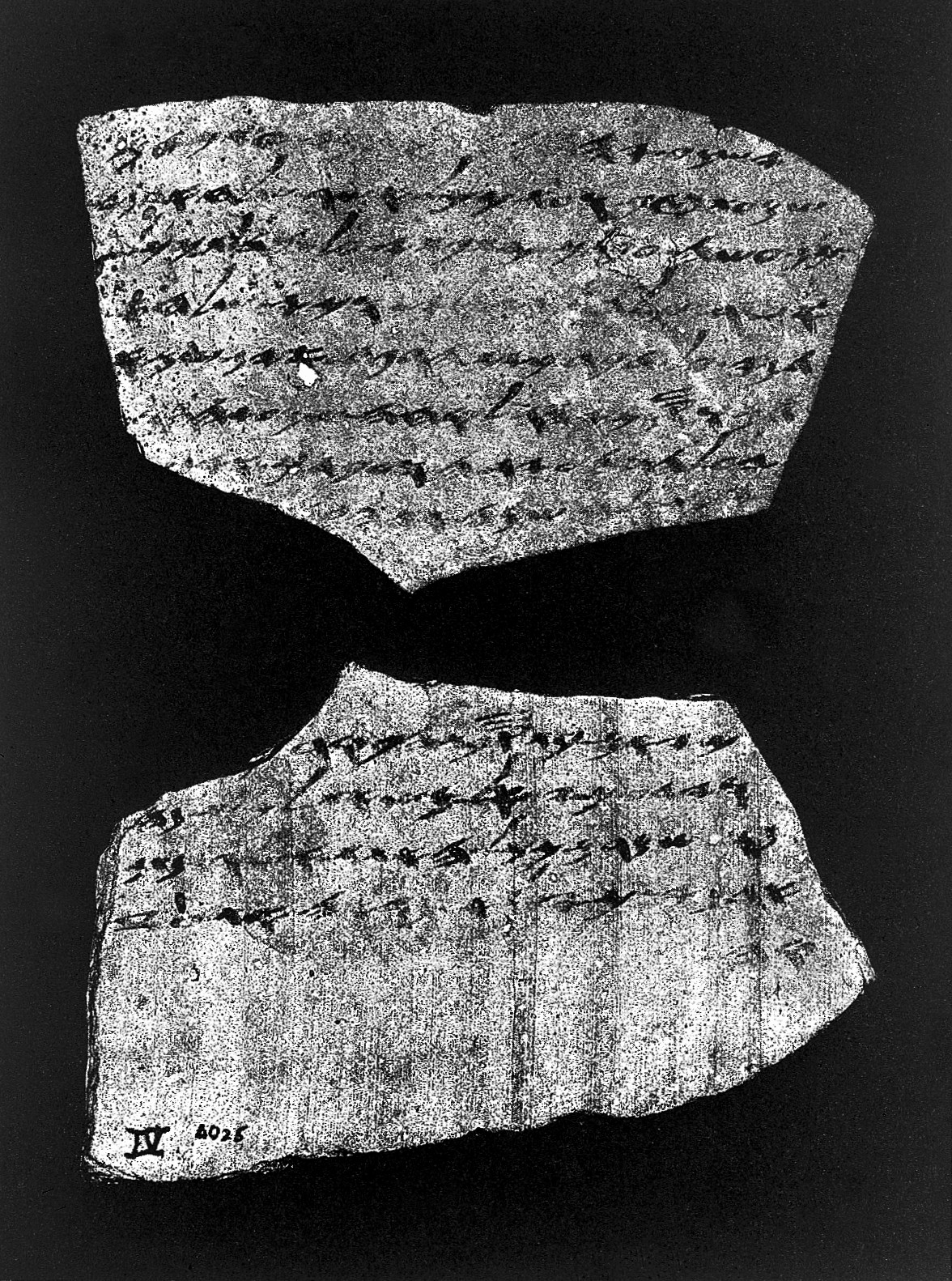

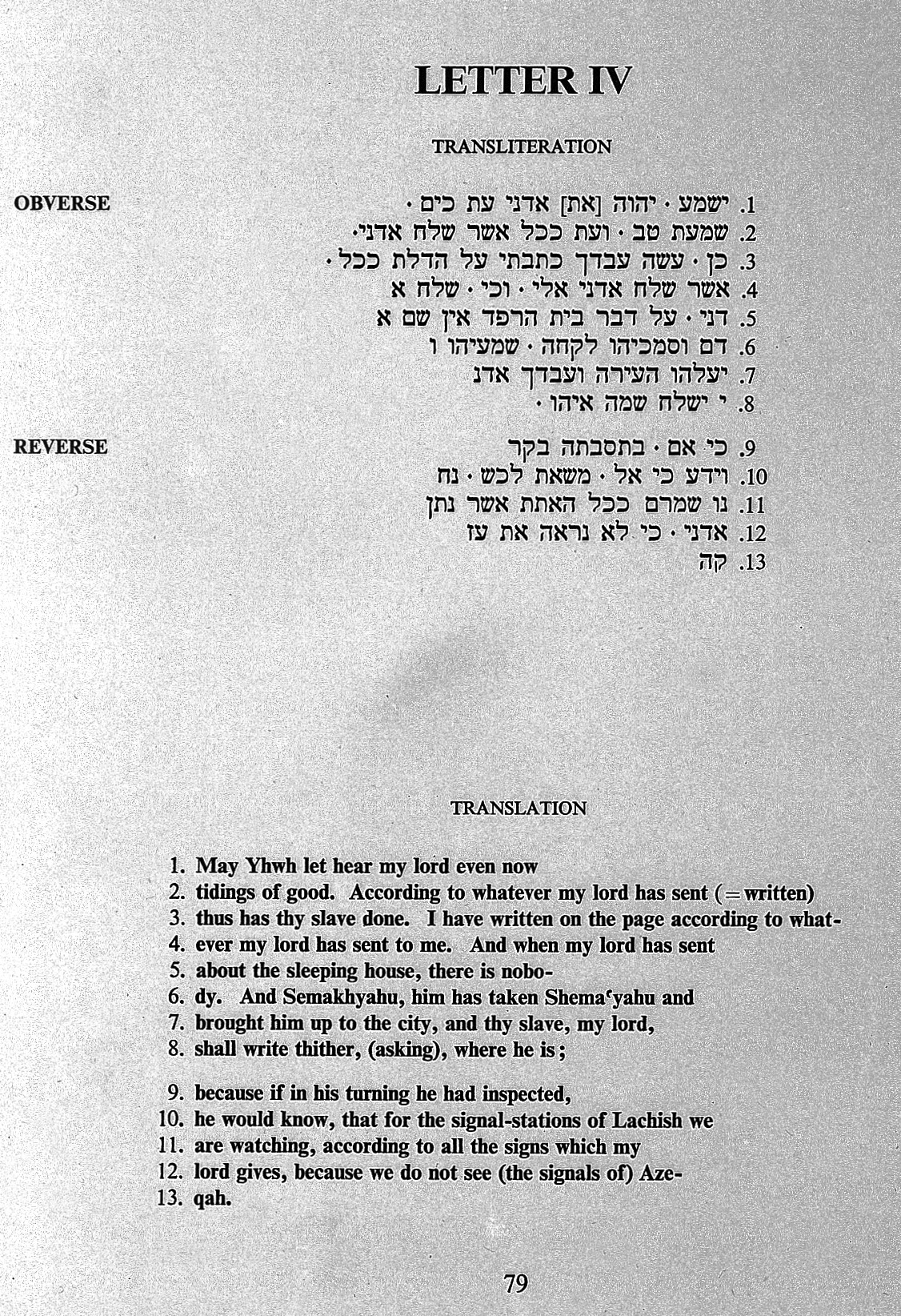

May YHWH cause my [lord] to hear, this very day, tidings of good. And now, according to everything which my lord has sent, this has your servant done. I wrote on the sheet according to everything which [you] sent [t]o me. And inasmuch as my lord sent to me concerning the matter of Bet Harapid, there is no one there. And as for Semachiah, Shemaiah took him and brought him up to the city. And your servant is not sending him there any[more ---], but when morning comes round [---]. And may (my lord) be apprised that we are watching for the fire signals of Lachish according to all the signs which my lord has given, because we cannot see Azeqah.

Letter Number 5

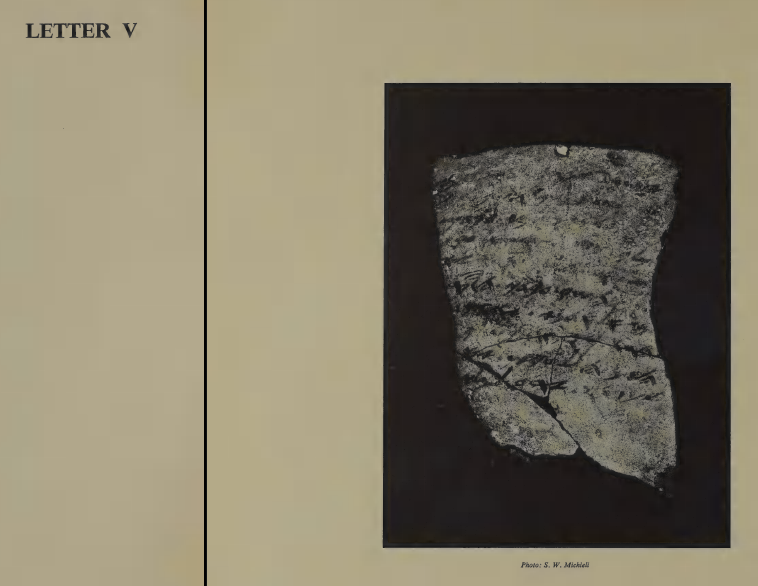

May YHWH cause my [lo]rd to hear tidings of pea[ce] and of good, [now today, now this very da]y! Who is your servant, a dog, that you [s]ent your servant the [letters? Like]wise has your servant returned the letters to my lord. May YHWH cause you to see the harvest successfully, this very day! Will Tobiah of the royal family c[o]me to your servant?

Letter Number 6

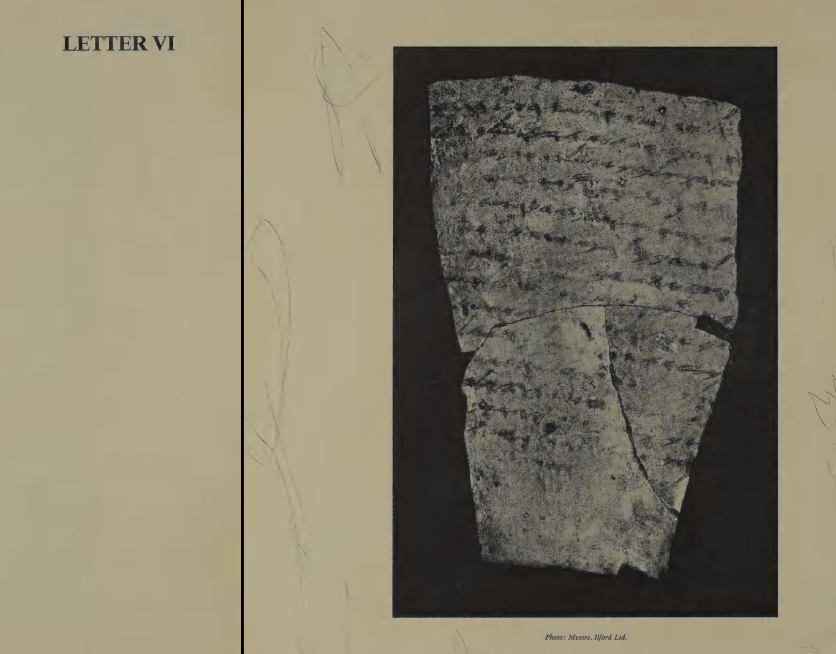

To my lord, Ya'ush, may YHWH cause my lord to see peace at this time! Who is your servant, a dog, that my lord sent him the king's [lette]r [and] the letters of the officer[s, sayin]g, "Please read!" And behold, the words of the [officers] are not good; to weaken your hands [and to in]hibit the hands of the m[en]. [I(?)] know [them(?)]. My lord, will you not write to [them] sa[ying, "Wh]y are you behaving this way? [...] well-being [...]. Does the king [...] And [...] As YHWH lives, since your servant read the letters, your servant has not had [peace(?)].

Letter Number 7

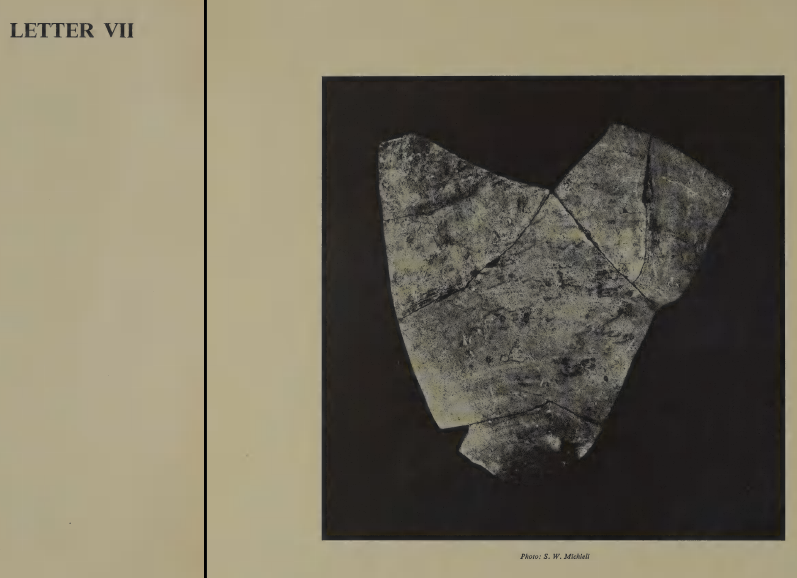

This letter contains 10 lines on one side and 4 on the other, but the letters are unreadable due to degradation.

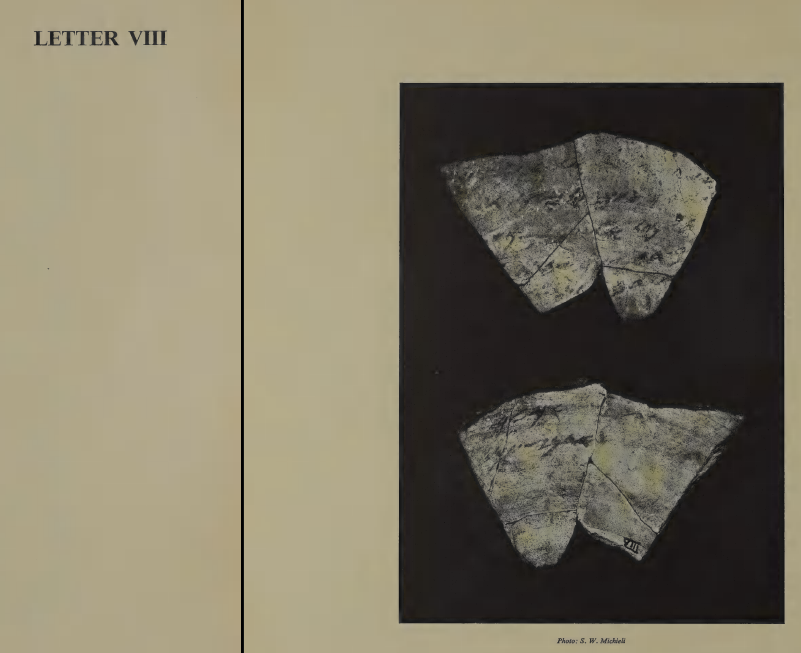

Letter Number 9

May YHWH cause my lord to hear ti[dings] of peace and of [good. And n]ow, give 10 (loaves) of bread and 2 (jars) [of wi]ne. Send back word [to] your servant by means of Shelemiah as to what we must do tomorrow.

== See also ==
- List of artifacts significant to the Bible
- Lachish reliefs
- Lachish ewer
- Archaeology of Israel
