= James Leslie Starkey =

British archaeologist (1895–1938)

- Born: 3 January 1895
- Died: 10 January 1938 (aged 43); Bayt Jibrin
- Occupation: Archaeologist
- Known for: Chief excavator of the first archaeological expedition to Lachish

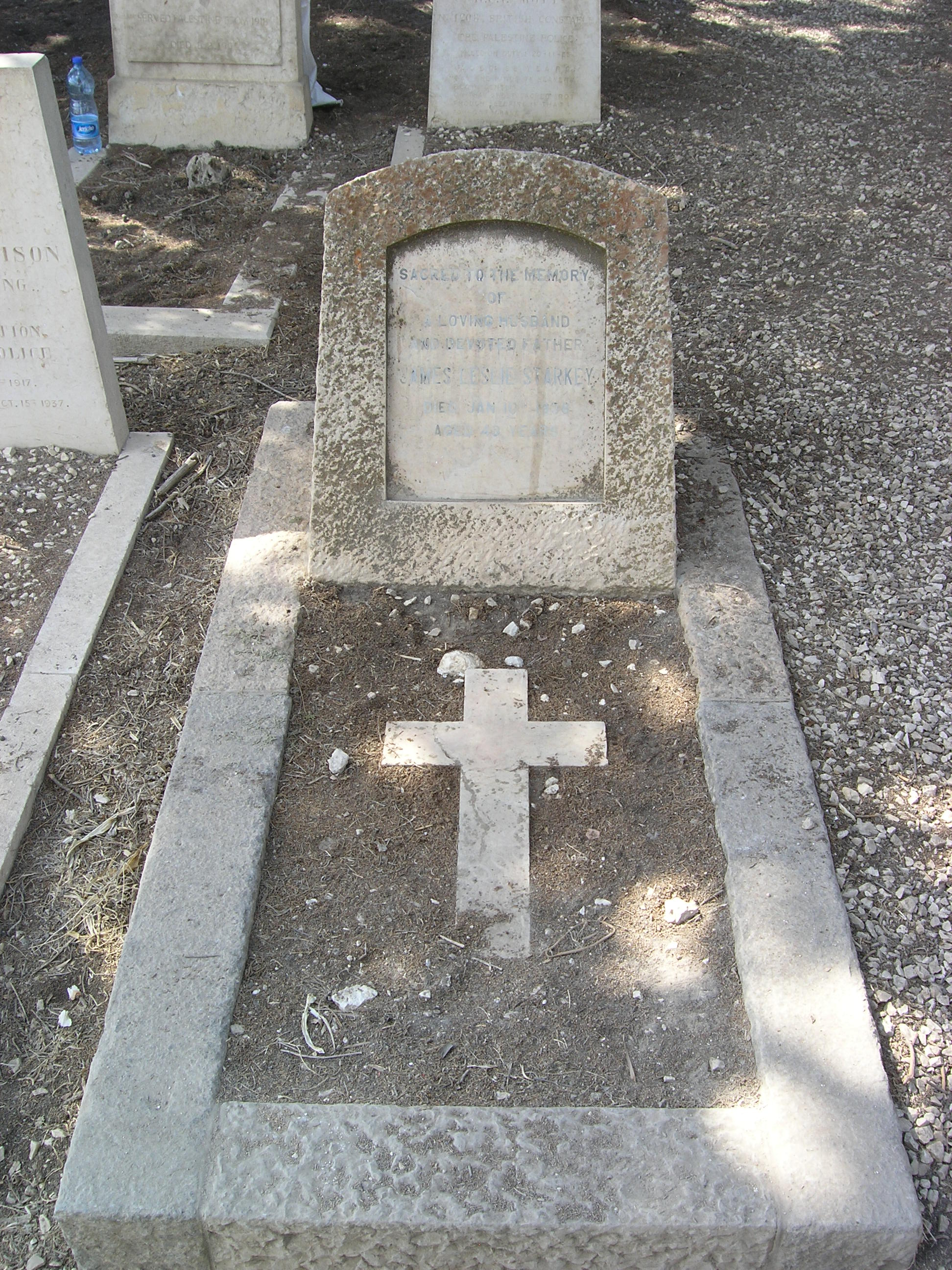

James Leslie Starkey FSA (3 January 1895 – 10 January 1938) was a noted British archaeologist of the ancient Near East and Palestine in the period before the Second World War. He was the chief excavator of the first archaeological expedition to Lachish (Tell ed-Duweir) from 1932 to his death.

== Death ==
On 10 January 1938, Starkey left Tell ed-Duweir in a prearranged taxi through Bayt Jibrin and Hebron to Jerusalem. Near Hebron, five masked armed men headed by Issa Battat, a rebel commander from the ad-Dhahiriya area who led a rebel unit during the 1936–1939 Arab revolt in Palestine against the British, stopped the vehicle. According to the driver’s subsequent testimony, the assailants identified Starkey as the director of the Tell ed-Duweir antiquities excavation, released the Christian Arab driver, and then shot Starkey. Battat was later ambushed and killed by British forces in May 1938.

A 2026 study by Roy Marom and Yosef Garfinkel based upon Palestinian oral histories, a previously unpublished petition, showed that Starkey's killing was an assassination arising from the land dispute over Tel Lachish. No agreement had been reached for access to the top of the mound and the government was in the process of compulsorily expropriating it.

After Starkey's death, his team finished the excavation season at Lachish. Olga Tufnell eventually published the excavation report, an important publication for Palestinian archeology, after twenty years of research and writing.

== Grave ==
Starkey is buried in the Protestant Cemetery on Mount Zion, Jerusalem.
