= Shaaraim =

Israelite city mentioned in the Hebrew Bible

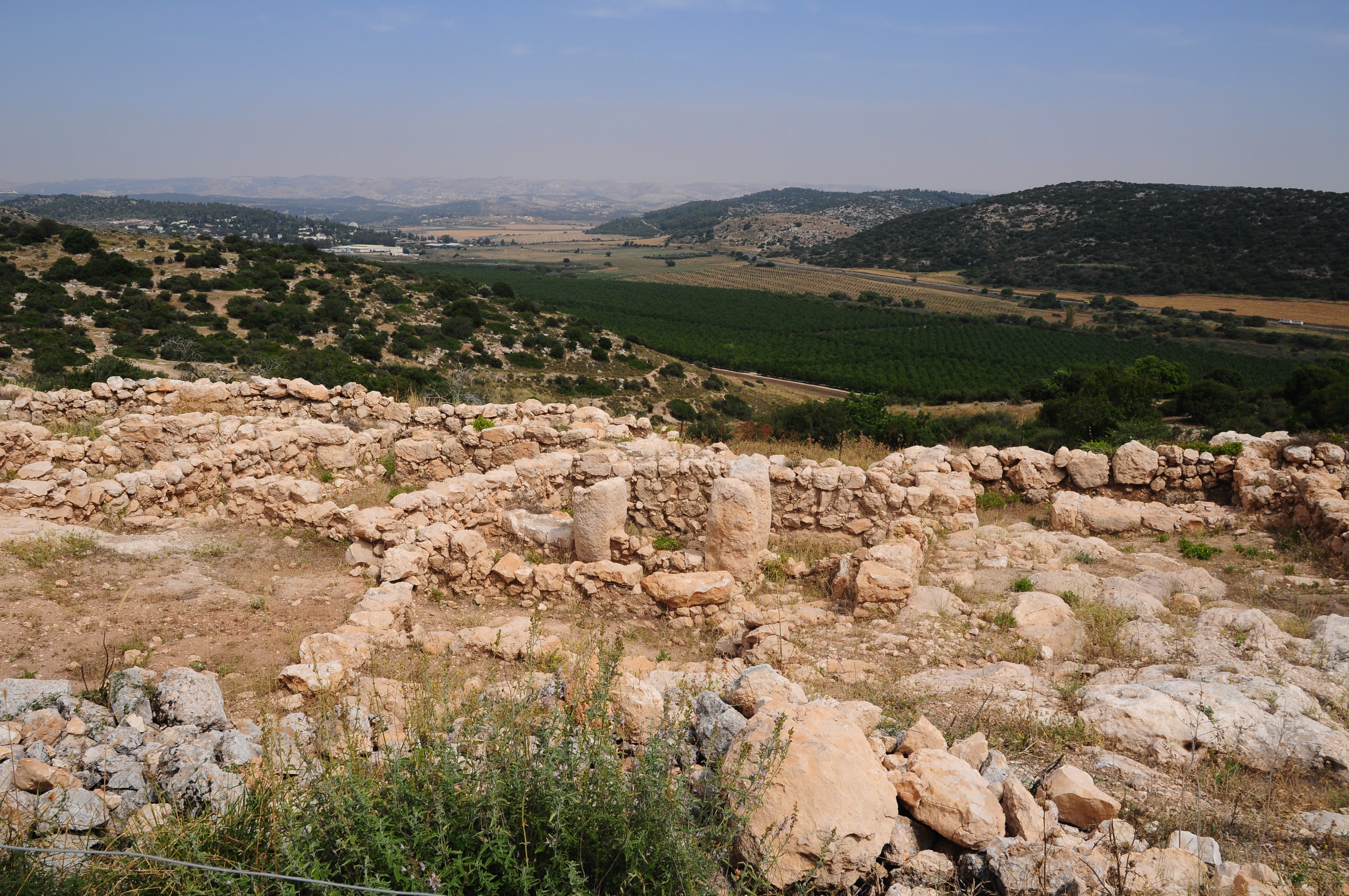
Ruins at Khirbet Qeiyafa: Proposed site of She'arayim

Shaaraim (Hebrew: שַׁעֲרַיִם, romanized: Šaʿărayim), possibly meaning Two Gates, is an Israelite city mentioned several times in the Hebrew Bible. Some have identified it with Khirbet Qeiyafa, an archaeological site on a hilltop overlooking the Valley of Elah in the Judean Mountains.

== Biblical references ==
The city appears in the city list of Judah's tribal inheritance, after Sokho and Azekah (Jos 15, 36). After David killed Goliath, the Philistines ran away and were slain on the "road to She'arayim" (1 Sam 17:52). In the city list of the tribe of Simeon, She'arayim is mentioned as one of the cities "unto the reign of David" (1 Chr 4:31).

== Identification with Kh. Qeiyafa ==
After excavating the site, Yosef Garfinkel of Hebrew University of Jerusalem and others believe that Khirbet Qeiyafa is She'arayim. Fieldwork uncovered a wall that makes a nearly complete circuit with two gates. Garfinkel says it is the only contender for She'arayim, as all other sites dating to the period have a single city gate. Carbon dating and the absence of pig bones strengthen Garfinkel's argument that Qeiyafa is Israelite She'aryaim and not a Canaanite fortress.

Israel Finkelstein claimed that Tel Megiddo and several other ancient towns in Canaan had two gates.

Nadav Na'aman of Tel Aviv University doubts that Sha'arayim means "two gates" at all, citing multiple scholarly opinions that the suffix -ayim in ancient place names is not the dual suffix used for ordinary words. Na'aman proposes instead that the name means just "gate", perhaps "because it was located on the western border of Judah with Philistia, a place that was seen as the gateway to the kingdom of Judah."
