= Mal'akhim-Shahariya Forest =

Israeli planted forest

- יער המלאכים-שחריה
- Interactive map of Mal'akhim-Shahariya Forest
- Location: Israel
- Coordinates: 31.598°N 34.830°E

Mal'akhim-Shahariya Forest (Hebrew: יער המלאכים-שחריה, lit. 'Ya'ar HaMal'akhim-Shahariya') is a planted forest covering approximately 7,000 dunams (1,730 acres) managed by the Jewish National Fund (JNF). It is located around 4 km east of Kiryat Gat in the southern Judean Lowlands, Israel.

== Etymology and History ==
The forest was established in 1956. It was initially known as Shahariya Forest, named after the Shahariya transit camp (ma'abara), built just west of the forest area that same year. Residents of the transit camp were employed by JNF to plant the trees, making this one of the first large-scale afforestation projects of its kind in Israel.

The northern section was subsequently renamed Hamalachim Forest ("The Angels Forest") in recognition of the Jewish community of Los Angeles, California. which raised the funds for the project. The name is a Hebrew rendering of the city's Spanish name, meaning "City of Angels".

== Geography and Ecology ==
The forest lies at an elevation of approximately 230 metres (750 ft) above sea level, in the transitional zone between the Judean Hills and the Coastal Plain. The ground in this part of the Judean Lowland is mostly soft white chalkstone with a thin layer of hard caliche crust on top. As chalk soils support only sparse natural vegetation, KKL-JNF mostly planted conifers like pine trees, which can handle the harsh conditions. On the other hand, the valleys gather better soil, so people planted deciduous trees there like carob, fig, and olive trees.

The open areas in and around the forest are mostly covered in desert brush. Common plants here include the buckthorn shrub, thorny burnet, and common thatching grass. Wild marjoram (hyssop) also grows naturally here, and it is a protected species that people are not allowed to pick. In the spring, flowers like anemones, cyclamens, and buttercups bloom, while wild mushrooms grow under the pines during the winter months. The forest canopy provides significant shade, making it a popular cooler retreat during hot summer days.

== Archaeology and Landmarks ==
Archaeological excavations in the forest found old ruins showing that people in ancient times used the soft stone to dig out caves, cisterns, and farming setups.

At Khirbet er-Ra'i, an archaeological site located inside the Shahariya forest, excavations have been conducted every summer since 2015 by the Hebrew University of Jerusalem, the Israel Antiquities Authority, and Macquarie University. In 2021, archaeologists found a rare 3,100-year-old piece of a pottery jug from the time of the Biblical Judges, around 1100 BCE. The piece has an ink inscription written on it with the name "Jerubbaal", which is another name for the judge Gideon. This was the first time anyone found this name in an archaeological dig from that time period.

Another notable landmark is the Karua Ruins (Khirbet Kharua), which covers about 30 dunams (7 acres) in the northern part of the forest and features an old three-level building. The uppermost level preserves ancient cattle enclosures, while the middle level has a two-room building from the Byzantine period that might have been a synagogue. Next to the building is a rectangular, plastered water cistern with five steps, which shows it was probably used as a ritual bath (mikveh).

The forest also contains a well-preserved lime furnace, which is a 6-meter-deep pit with a diameter of 4 meters. It was used in the past to burn limestone to make lime for plastering water cisterns. Nearby, an old olive press was found on the northern slope, featuring large round stones for crushing and benches cut into the rock. There are also several stone winepresses scattered along the forest trails. The Winepress Trail (Hebrew: שביל הגתות) specifically guides visitors through a concentrated cluster of these agricultural systems, attesting to the area's ancient viticulture. A unique botanical landmark along the main trail is the Split Carob Tree (Hebrew: החרוב המפוצל), where an ancient carob tree's trunk split over time, allowing a large pine tree to grow directly out of its center.

== Recreation and Accessibility ==
Mal'akhim-Shahariya Forest has a paved circular main road, picnic areas, playgrounds, and an old fire watchtower that will eventually become a visitors' center. The central recreation lawns feature unique, large iron and stone playground sculptures designed by artist Ruslan Sergeev. These environmental sculptures include a giant, colorful worker ant with interactive climbing elements, and a large lizard that functions as a playground slide.

The forest was also adapted for visitors with physical disabilities, with a recreation area and bathrooms built for people with physical disabilities. The park has several specific trails for walking and cycling, like the Kedem Trail, the Olive Press Route, the Winepress Trail, and the Herb Gardens Trail, which is a short path with planted sage, lavender, thyme, white-leaved savory, and rosemary.
