= Nadav Na'aman =

Israeli archaeologist and historian

- נדב נאמן
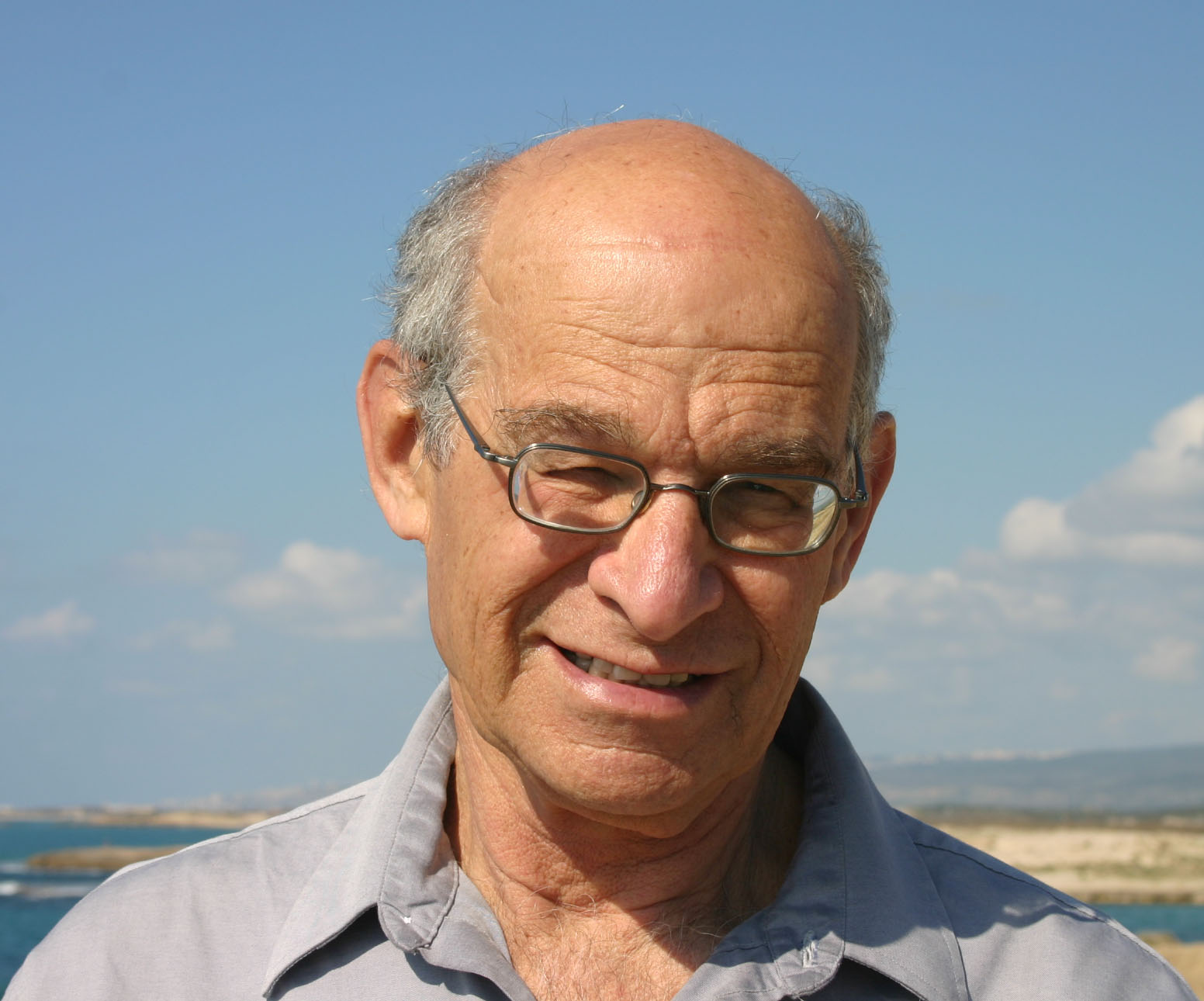
- Na'aman in 2006
- Born: 1939 (age 86–87); Palestine, United Kingdom
- Alma mater: Tel Aviv University (PhD)
- Military career
- Allegiance: Israel
- Service years: 1957-1960

Nadav Na'aman (Hebrew: נדב נאמן; born 1939) is an Israeli archaeologist and historian. He specializes in the study of the Near East in the second and first millenniums BC. His research combines the history of the Ancient Near East, archaeology, Assyrology, and the study of the Hebrew Bible. He possesses broad knowledge in all these four branches of research.

== Early life and education ==
Na'aman was born on a kibbutz near Jerusalem and grew up in Kvutzat Kinneret, a kibbutz on the Sea of Galilee. His father was Professor Shlomo Na'aman, who taught in the Department of General History of Tel Aviv University (TAU).

After completing his IDF military service (1957-1960), he left the kibbutz in 1964 and studied archaeology and Jewish history.

== Career ==
Na'aman received his doctorate in 1975 from Tel Aviv University with Yohanan Aharoni as supervisor, with a thesis on the importance of the Amarna letters for the history of Israel. He subsequently worked as a lecturer in archaeology and history of the ancient Near East at TAU.

In 1984, Na'aman became Associate Professor of Jewish History. From 1989 until his retirement in 2007, he held a chair in Jewish history at TAU. In 2012, he was elected a member of the Israel Academy of Sciences.

=== Azekah Inscription ===
In 1974, Na'aman published his first article, which contained a discovery of considerable importance for research. He found that what had been regarded as two separate clay tablets written in cuneiform in the Akkadian language, each attributed to another king of Assyria, Tiglath Pileser III and Sargon II, respectively, are actually fragments of one single tablet that had been broken at some point. This tablet became known as the Azekah Inscription.

Earlier, in one of these two pieces, researchers read the name of Azariah, King of Judah, and therefore assumed that he took part in the war that was going on in central Syria. The fragment of the second tablet mentions the attack on the city of Azekah, which was attributed to Sargon, king of Assyria.

When the two fragments of the tablets were put together, it became clear that they describe, in considerable detail, the Assyrian King Sennacherib's campaign against Hezekiah, king of Judah. As a result, what was written earlier about Tiglath-Pileser and Sargon's campaigns to the Land of Israel was removed from scholarship, and instead, important details were added about Sennacherib's campaigns into Judah in 701 BCE.

=== Provenance of el-Amarna letters ===
Na'aman teamed up with archaeologists Israel Finkelstein and Yuval Goren to try to determine the origin of the Amarna tablets. They conducted the examination of the composition and origin of clay of which the tablets were made.

Yuval Goren removed samples from hundreds of tablets, tested and determined what material they were made of and from where in Canaan a material with such a chemical and mineralogical composition could have originated. Thus, in combination with the historical data emerging from the tablets and the archaeological data from sites throughout Canaan, the researchers determined the provenance of these tablets.

The three authored the book Inscribed in Clay, in which they presented the data from their research, including conclusions about the origin of the tablets and what this implies for the study of the Amarna documents. In this way they could determine the origin of many tablets in which the sender's name was lost through damage, or was not mentioned at all.

There are also cases where the names of places are mentioned, but researchers disagreed on their identification, thus a petrographic examination of the clay made it possible to decide the debate.

=== Other contributions ===
Na'aman also took part in the Brook of Egypt debate, identifying this biblical river as the Besor Stream.

The identification of the site of Khirbet Qeiyafa proved to be problematic. Na'aman also contributed significantly to this debate. He held that the ruins were Canaanite, based on strong similarities with the nearby Canaanite excavations at Beit Shemesh.

The tribute volume upon his retirement was published in 2006.

== Selected publications ==
- Ancient Israel and Its Neighbors: Interaction and Counteraction. Collected Essays, Vol. 1. Winona Lake 2005.
- Canaan in the Second Millennium B.C.E. Collected Essays, Vol. 2. Winona Lake 2005.
- Ancient Israel's History and Historiography: The First Temple Period. Collected Essays, Vol. 3. Winona Lake 2006.

== Family ==
His younger sister is Michal Na'aman, a noted Israeli artist.
