= Khirbet er-Ra'i =

Archaeological site in Israel

Khirbet ar-Ra'i
- ח'ירבת א-ראעי (Hebrew)
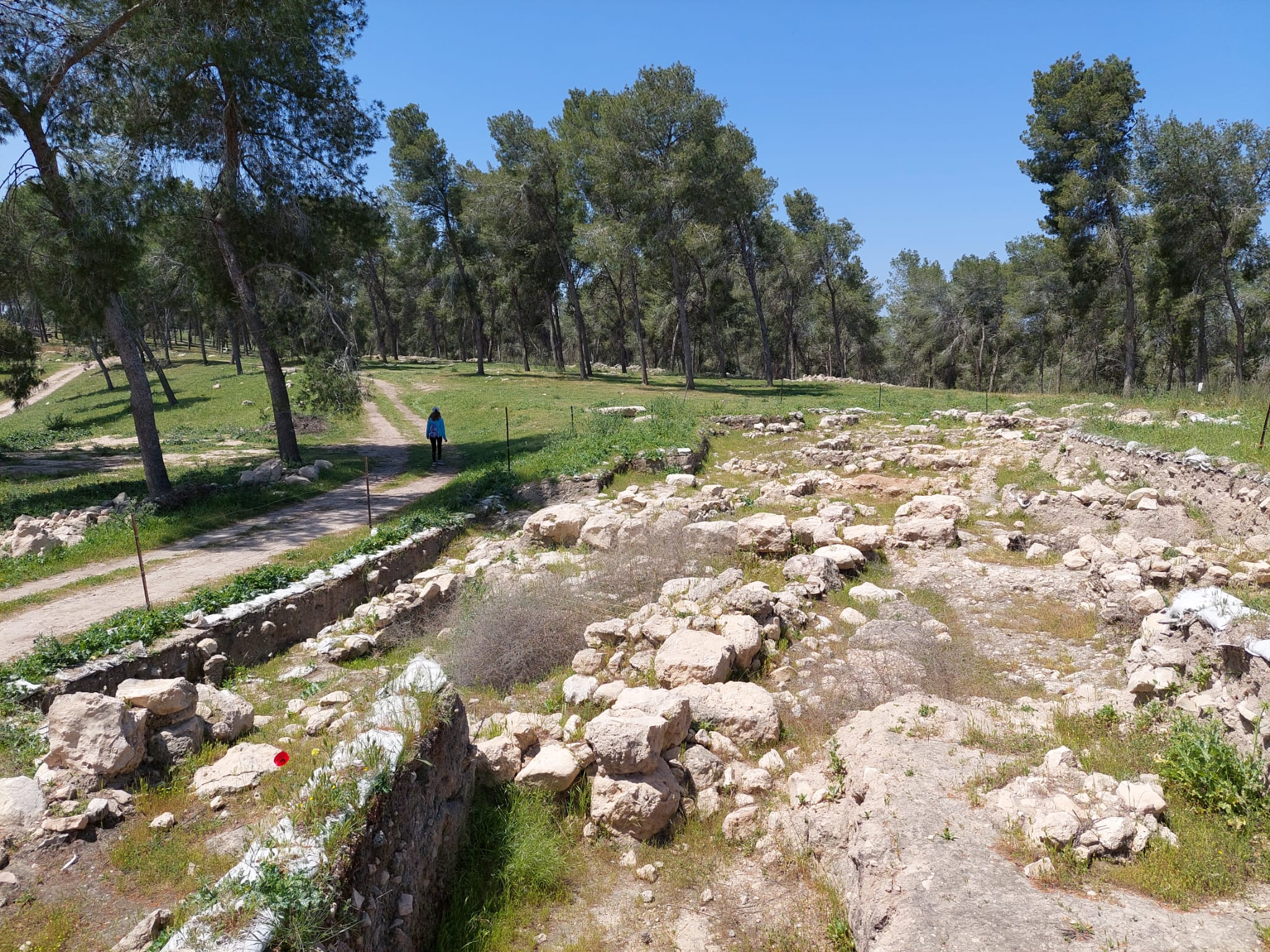

- Location within Israel
- 31°35′27.6″N 34°49′09.4″E
- Periods: Bronze Age, Iron Age, Persian period, Hellenistic period, Byzantine period, Early Arab period, Ottoman period
- Cultures: Canaanite, Philistine
- Region: Shfela
- Grid position: 133/111 PAL

Site notes
- Archaeologists: Yosef Garfinkel and Saar Ganor

Khirbet er-Ra'i, also Khirbet al-Ra'i, (formerly Tôr el Hiry,) is an archaeological site in the Shephelah region of Israel. It is located 4 km west of Lachish.

Archeological excavations conducted in Khirbet er-Ra'i in the past decade have uncovered remains dating back to the 12th-10th centuries BCE. According to the site's excavators, it was mainly a Canaanite site, but with a strong Philistine influence.

== Location ==
Khirbet er-Ra'i is situated on a hill on the Lachish River's southern bank, between the upper and lower parts of the Shfela (Shephelah). The hill is overlooking the Coastal Plain in the west, the Mount Hebron and Jerusalem in the east and Tell ej-Judeideh and Maresha to the north. Khirbet er-Ra'i controls the main road connecting the coastal plain with the Shephelah and Judea.

According to the archeologists, these features make the site suitable to serve as a forward outpost of the settlements in the area of Lachish.

== Discovery and excavations ==
The site was noted on the PEF Survey of Palestine maps as Tôr el Hiry, meaning "The mount of the granary; a cliff formed apparently by a landslip" according to E.H. Palmer, 1881. It was noted by Yehudah Dagan in 1992, and first excavated in October 2015 and April 2016 on behalf of the Institute of Archaeology at The Hebrew University of Jerusalem and the Israel Antiquities Authority and under the direction of by Yosef Garfinkel and Saar Ganor. Two excavation areas (A and B) were opened were the remains of structures could be seen on the surface. The excavation revealed the ruins of a massive structure dating to the Iron Age I–II and fences from the Ottoman period. Other periods were represented in potsherds from the Middle Bronze Age, Persian, Hellenistic, Byzantine and the Early Islamic Period.

== Archaeological findings ==
Khirbet er-Ra'i appears to have been the main site in the region after the fall of Canaanite Lachish in the late 12th and early 11th centuries BCE. During the 10th century BCE, Khirbet er-Ra'i was a small village, but seems to have had the largest pottery assemblage in the region after Khirbet Qeiyafa.

=== Proto-Canaanite inscription ===
In 2021, archaeologists Garfinkel and Ganor announced the discovery of a proto-Canaanite inscription dating to the 12th century BCE in Khirbet ar-Ra'i, a time period seen by many as the historical setting for the Biblical Book of Judges. The inscription, found on a jar, was deciphered by the epigrapher Prof. Christopher Rollston as bearing the name Jerubbaal, a name that appears only once in the Hebrew Bible as another name for the judge Gideon. According to the archaeologists, this inscription may refer to another Jerubbaal and not the Gideon of biblical tradition, but the fact that an identical name is found in archaeological site dating to a period identified with that of the Judges, shows that even though the Hebrew Bible was compiled in a much later period, some historical memories were preserved and passed down through the generations.

Haggai Misgav of the Hebrew University says that because the inscription is partial, he is not certain that "Jerubbaal" is the only possible reading. It's possible that the first letter seen could actually be a zayin letter, not a yodh. There may have been an ayin before that, so the inscription could also refer to "Azruba'al".

== Identification with Ziklag ==
A number of scholars have suggested that Khirbet al-Ra'i is the site of biblical Ziklag. Other scholars, such as Israel Finkelstein and Aren Maeir, argue against this identification, on the basis of biblical geography and the lack of continuity in names.

== See also ==
- Khirbet Qeiyafa
- Proto-Canaanite alphabet
- Gideon
