= Shephelah =

Lowland region in south-central Israel

Shephela שְׁפֵלַת יְהוּדָה (Hebrew) Shfela, Judean Foothills, Judean Lowlands
- Region
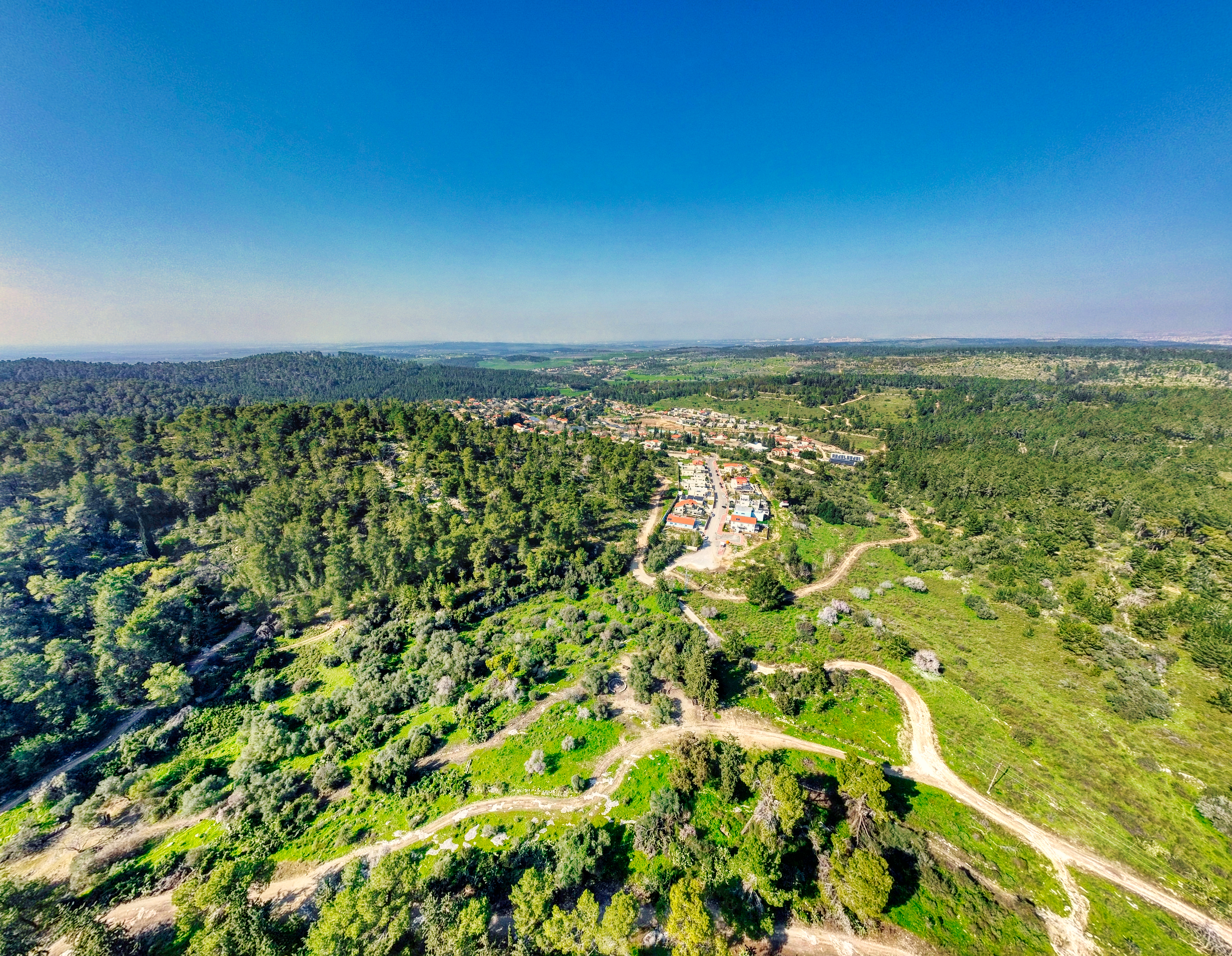
- The Shephela near Tarum

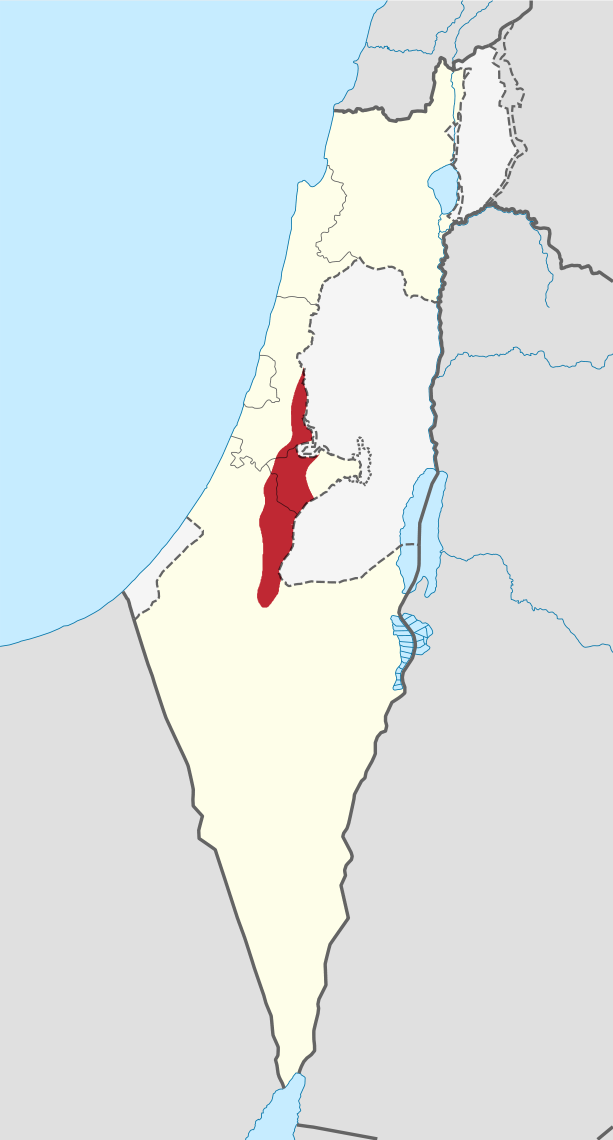
- Coordinates: 31°42′N 34°55′E
- Geology: Rolling hills

Dimensions
  - Length: 55 km (N-S)
  - Width: 10-15 km (E-W)
- Highest elevation: 460 m (1,510 ft)

The Shephelah (Biblical Hebrew: הַשְּפֵלָה, romanized: hašŠəp̄ēlā, lit. 'the Lowlands') or Shfela (Modern Hebrew: הַשְּׁפֵלָה, romanized: haŠfelá), or the Judaean Foothills (Modern Hebrew: שְׁפֵלַת יְהוּדָה, romanized: Šfelát Yəhūdá), is a transitional region of soft-sloping rolling hills in south-central Israel stretching over 10–15 km (6.2–9.3 mi) between the Judaean Mountains and the Coastal Plain. The different use of the term "Judean Plain", as either defining just the Coastal Plain segment stretching along the Judaean Mountains, or also including, or only referring to, the Shfela, often creates confusion.

Today the Shfela is largely rural with many farms, but the cities of Ashdod, Ashkelon, Rehovot, Beit Shemesh, and Kiryat Gat roughly surround it.

The Bible assigned land in the Shfela to the tribes of Judah and Dan.

== Biblical references ==
The Shfela is mentioned many times in the Hebrew Bible. In the King James Version, its name tends to be translated as 'vale' or 'valley'. The Shfela was the site of many biblical battles. During the Bar Kokhba revolt, hollowed out hills were connected to form elaborate bunker systems for the combat with the Romans.

== Geography ==
The Shfela region within Israel. Right: cities surrounding it - Rehovot (north), Ashdod & Ashkelon (coast), Beit Shemesh & Kiryat Gat (east)

The Shfela is bordered to the northeast by the Samarian Hills and the north-south Afek Pass at Rosh HaAyin-Antipatris (near the east-west Ayalon Valley) and Rishon LeZion in the northwest, and in the south by the northern Negev (the Nahal Shikma area).

The Shfela consists of fertile rolling hills. Topographically, it represents the transition from the higher and more rugged Jerusalem and Hebron Mountains, whose foothills it forms, and the Coastal Plain. About 60 km (35 miles) long in north–south direction and only 13 km (8 miles) wide, it is subdivided into two parts: the western "Low Shephelah", which starts at an altitude of ca. 150 metres above sea level and rises to no more than ca. 200 metres above the Coastal Plain, and the eastern "High Shephelah" rising to altitudes between 250 and 450 metres above sea level. In the upper part the valleys descending from the Judean Mountains are deeper, and they broaden once they reach the lower part where the riverbeds create larger spaces between the hills. Where they reach the Shfela, the rivers can flow over substantial distances along the border between the mountains and the hills, forming longitudinal valleys. Passage between the east–west and north–south valleys has dictated the communication routes throughout history.

In geological terms, the Shfela is a syncline, i.e. it formed as a basin whose rock layers were folded downwards, but is part of the wider south Judean anticlinorium-a regional formation characterised by upward folding. Typical to the Shfela are the Senonian-Eocene chalky formations. The soft Eocene chalk is known locally as kirton, which tends to build a harder upper calcrete crust (nari), so that in the past people quarried the kirton while leaving the nari layer in place as a ceiling. Apart from using the extracted rock, they also utilised the generated underground hollows for different purposes (refuge, burial, storage etc.).

One of the major characteristics is hills formed of marl-covered soft chalk, as opposed to the Judean Hills which are made of hard chalk and dolomite. The valleys and lower areas contain soil with a high sand content, as well as large tracts of fertile areas. Seasonal swamps can develop during the rainy season. The southern part is made up of loess, while north of Ashkelon consists of clay.

The Shfela has a temperate Mediterranean to semi-arid climate.

A series of east–west valleys cuts the Shfelah into districts. From north to south, they are: the Valley of Ayalon, Sorek Valley, Valley of Elah, Guvrin Valley, Valley of Lachish, and Valley of Adorayim. The biblical towns established there guarded settlements of the interior and took advantage of trade passing along this route. Ayalon was the primary access corridor to Jerusalem along the ascent of Horon.

Caves are a major feature of the southern part of the Shfela, many of them bell-shaped such as those in Beit Guvrin.

== History and archaeology ==
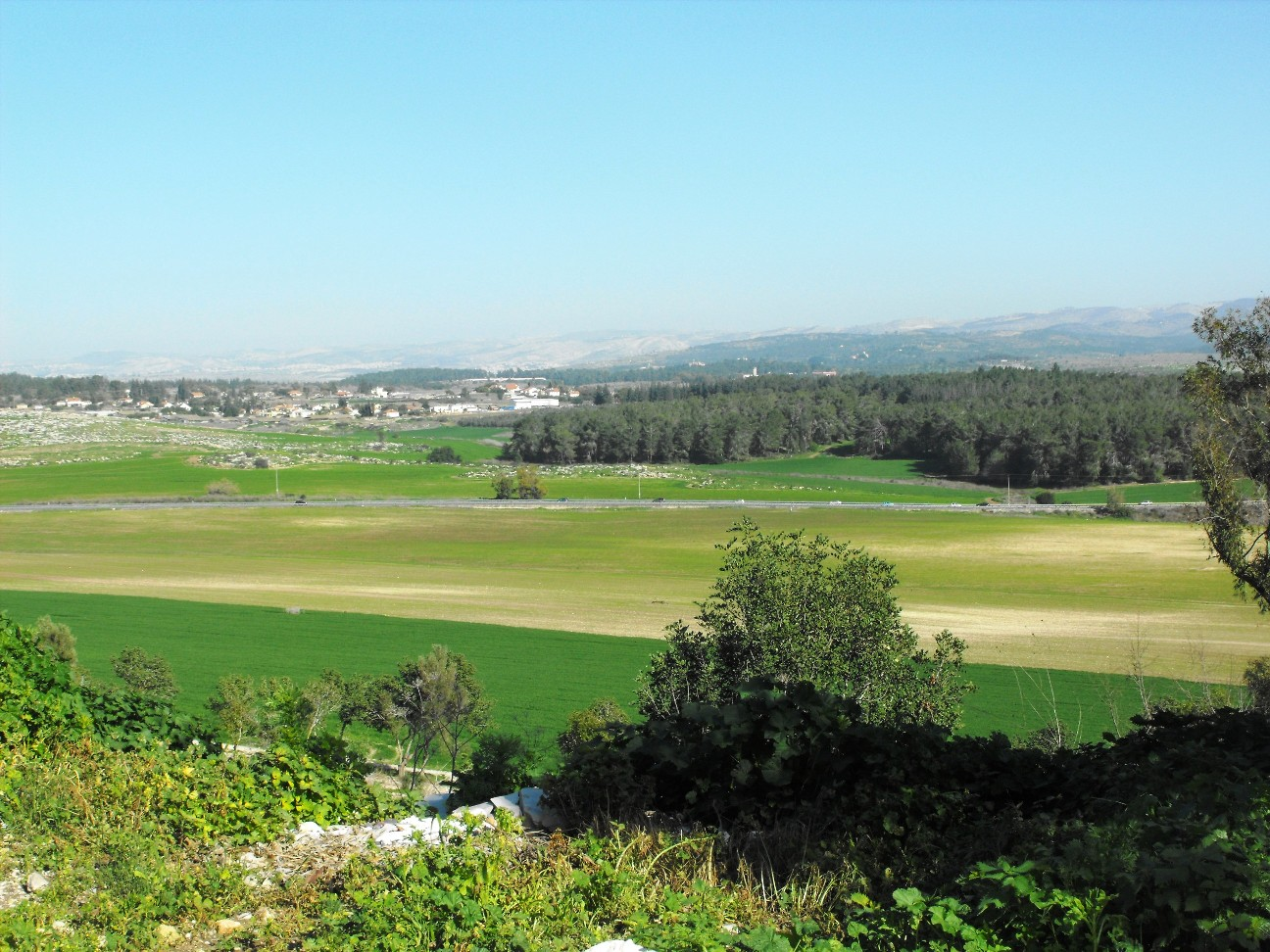
Shfela lowlands

Archaeological surveys in the Shephelah have found evidence of habitation during the Late Bronze period. During the early Iron Age, the population of what has been widely believed to be a Canaanite enclave between the rising centres of both coastal Philistia and the Israelite/Judahite highlands, went into decline, though a string of settlements survived on the eastern edge. In the Iron Age IIA–B, population growth resumed and by the 8th century BCE it was densely populated, not so much by natural growth but as a result of incoming settlers, beginning with the short-lived settlement at Khirbet Qeiyafa. The overall estimated numbers for inhabitants range from 50,000 to 100,000, over numerous sites such as Tel Lachish, Azekah, Tel Burna, Tel Zayit, Khirbet el-Qom, Tel Erani, Tel Harasim and Tel Nagila. This colonization, together with the inhabitants of the Canaanite enclave, identified with the highland Israelite/Judahite culture, and its expansion coincides with the decline of Philistia. In the 8th century BCE, the Shephelah was the most densely populated region in the Kingdom of Judah, but most excavated sites in the region were destroyed during the Assyrian invasion of 701 BCE, leaving the area largely depopulated in the following century.

During the decline and ultimate destruction of Judah by the Neo-Babylonian Empire in 587 BCE, the region was taken over gradually by the Edomites and it became the core of what was known in Greek as Idumea. The Shephela flourished during the Hellenistic period, was strongly affected by the First Jewish–Roman War (66–70) and was largely depopulated of Jews as a result of the Bar Kokhba revolt (132–136). It flourished again in the Byzantine period and was the scene of one of the major battles during the Muslim conquest of the Levant of the 7th century.

During the late Mamluk and early Ottoman periods, the Shephelah underwent a marked reorganization of settlement patterns, characterized by the contraction of permanent villages and the increased use of marginal landscapes for seasonal habitation, pastoralism, and limited agriculture. Archaeological evidence from sites such as Horvat Midras (Khirbet Drūsye) and Khirbet Beit Lei indicates that abandoned ancient ruins were reused as temporary shelters and activity areas, reflecting adaptive strategies in a landscape shaped by political instability, changing administrative control, and security concerns. Archaeological evidence from Horvat Midras includes a rare mold for casting lead musket balls, found concealed within a roughly built wall of a temporary structure dating to the late sixteenth or seventeenth century. The find indicates local production of ammunition and reflects the need for personal security in a rural landscape marked by instability and reduced administrative presence. Such evidence illustrates how communities in the Shephelah adapted to changing conditions through seasonal occupation and self-reliance during the Ottoman era.

=== Archaeological sites ===
- Azekah
- Tel Batash
- Maresha
- Beit Jimal
- Tell Beit Mirsim
- Beit Shemesh
- Tel Burna
- Tel 'Eton
- Gezer
- Imwas and Emmaus Nicopolis
- Tel Halif
- Horvat Burgin
- Horvat 'Ethri
- Horvat Midras
- Jarmuth
- Tell ej-Judeideh
- Keilah
- Kharruba
- Khirbet el-Ein
- Khirbet Beit Lei
- Tel Lachish
- Lavnin
- Khirbet Qeiyafa
- Khirbet er-Ra'i
- Sokho
- Tel Yona
- Tel Zayit
- Zorah

== See also ==
- Archaeology of the Bar Kokhba Revolt
- Geography of Israel
- Kiryat Gat – modern Israeli town
- Latrun – historical site and modern monastery in the Ayalon Valley
- Modi'in-Maccabim-Re'ut – modern Israeli town
