= Khirbet Qeiyafa =

Archaeological site in Israel

- Elah fortress
- 31.6963°N 34.9575°E
- Periods: Iron Age, Hellenistic
- Grid position: 146/122 PAL

History
- Built: 10th-century BCE

Site notes
- Excavation dates: 2007 –
- Archaeologists: Yosef Garfinkel, Saar Ganor
- Condition: ruin
- Website: qeiyafa.huji.ac.il

Khirbet Qeiyafa (Arabic: خِرْبَة قِيَافَة, romanized: Khirbat Qiyāfa), also known as Elah Fortress and in Hebrew as Horbat Qayafa (Hebrew: חוֹרְבָת קַייָאפַה), is the site of an ancient fortress city overlooking the Valley of Elah and dated to the first half of the 10th century BCE. The ruins of the fortress were uncovered in 2007, near the Israeli city of Beit Shemesh, 30 km (20 mi) from Jerusalem. It covers nearly 2.3 ha (6 acres) and is encircled by a 700-meter-long (2,300 ft) city wall constructed of field stones, some weighing up to eight tons. Excavations at site continued in subsequent years.

The two excavators, Yosef Garfinkel and Saar Ganor, have identified the site with Sha'arayim ("Two Gates"), because of the two gates unique to the site. This is based on their conclusions that the site dates to the early Iron IIA, ca. 1025–975 BCE, a range which includes the biblical date for the biblical Kingdom of David. Others suggest it might represent either a North Israelite, Philistine, or Canaanite fortress, a claim rejected by the archaeological team that excavated the site. The team's conclusion that Khirbet Qeiyafa was a fortress of King David has been criticised by Israel Finkelstein and associates.

== Settlement periods ==
There is a continued debate on the period based on ceramic finds and radiocarbon results. Pottery points to either Late Iron Age I or Iron Age IIa. Garfinkel refined the chronology of the Iron Age phase at Qeiyafa to ca. 1000–975 BCE.

The site was resettled during the late Persian and early Hellenistic periods, until it became deserted once again around 260 BCE. The top layer of the fortress shows that the fortifications were renewed in the Hellenistic period.

In the Byzantine period, a luxurious land villa was built on top of the Iron Age II palace and cut the older structure in two.

== Names ==
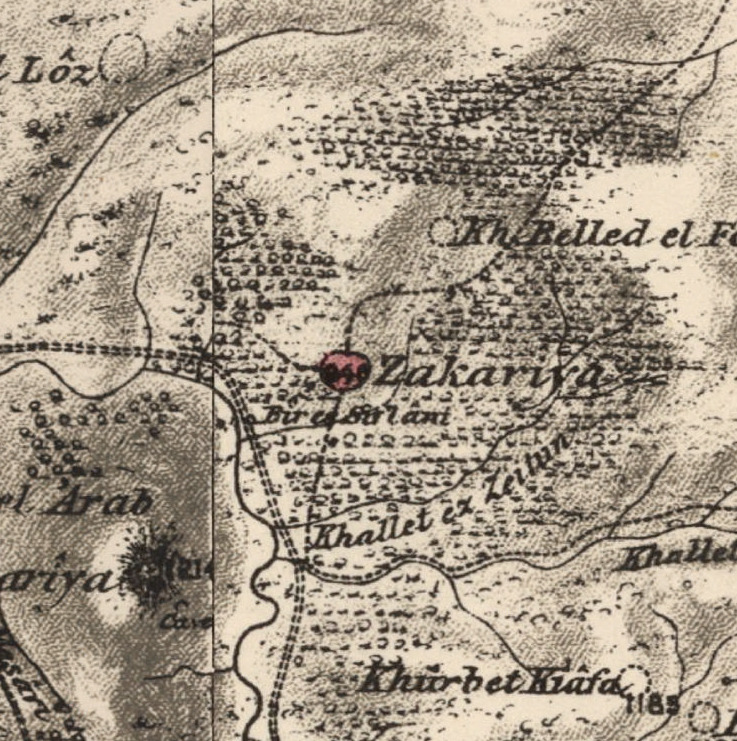
The site in the 1870s, southeast of the former Palestinian village of Az-Zakariyya

The meaning of the Arabic name of the site, Khirbet Qeiyafa, is uncertain. Scholars suggest it may mean "the place with a wide view." In 1881, Palmer thought that Kh. Kîâfa meant "the ruin of tracking foot-steps".

The modern Hebrew name, מבצר האלה, or the Elah Fortress was suggested by Foundation Stone directors David Willner and Barnea Levi Selavan at a meeting with Garfinkel and Ganor in early 2008. Garfinkel accepted the idea and excavation t-shirts with that name were produced for the 2008 and 2009 seasons. The name derives from the location of the site on the northern bank of Nahal Elah, one of six brooks that flow from the Judean mountains to the coastal plain.

== Geography ==
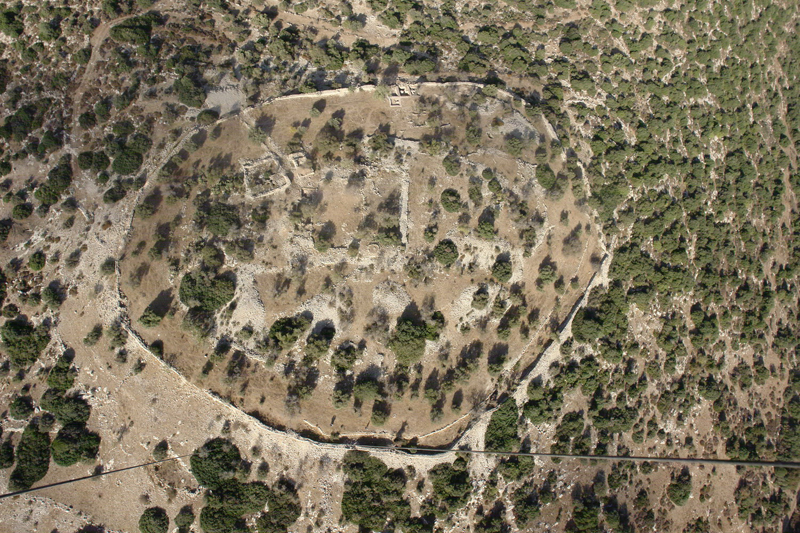
Aerial view

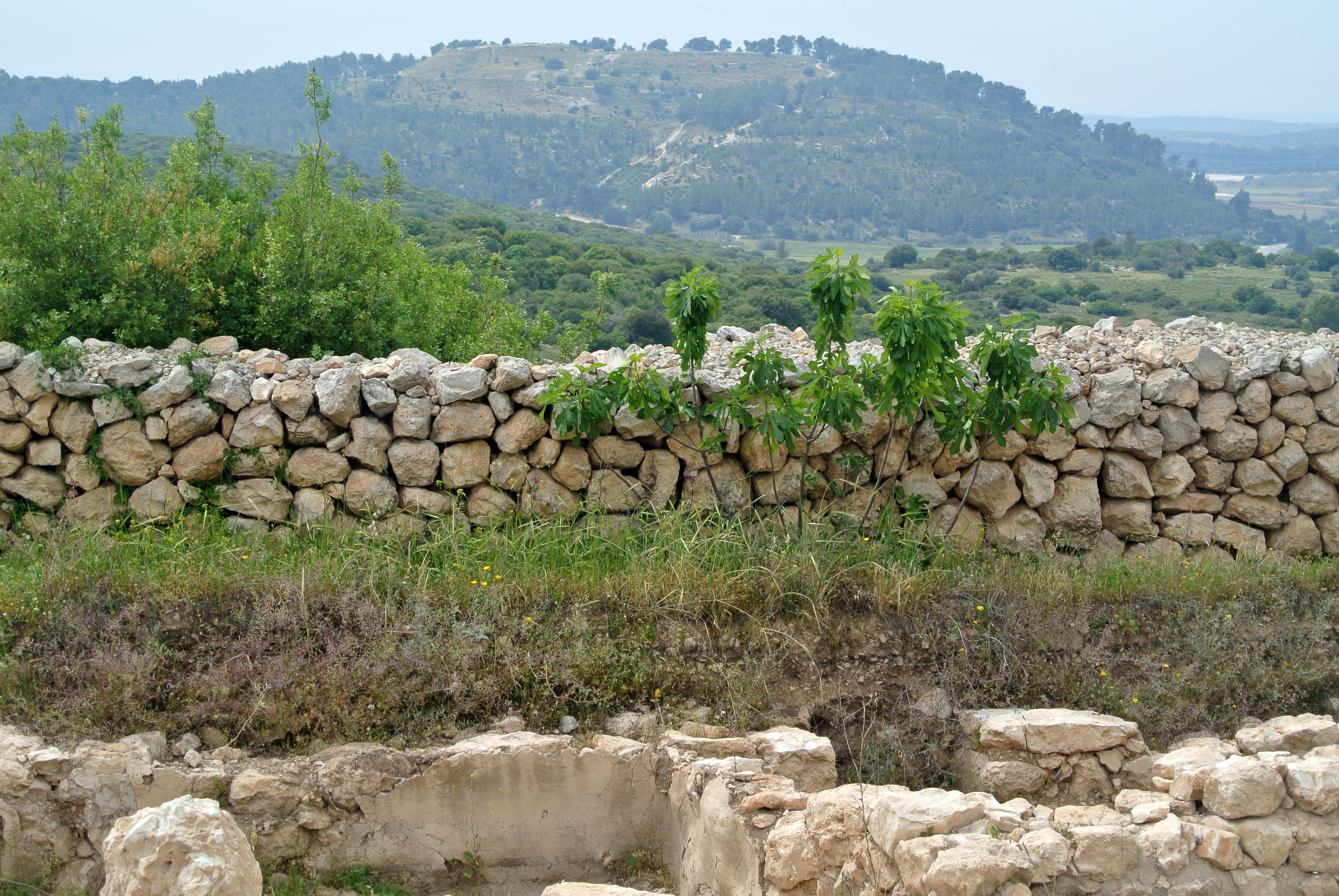
View of Tel Azeka from Khirbet Qeiyafa, Israel. Top wall is later; lower walls from Iron Age site. Note plastered room interior wall.

The Elah Fortress lies just inside a north-south ridge of hills separating Philistia and Gath to the west from Judea to the east. The ridge also includes the site currently identified as Tel Azekah. Past this ridge is a series of connecting valleys between two parallel groups of hills. Tel Sokho lies on the southern ridge with the tell of Adullam behind it. The Elah Fortress is on the northern ridge, overlooking several valleys with a clear view of the Judaean Mountains. Behind it to the northeast is Tel Yarmuth. From the topography, archaeologists believe this was the location of the cities of Adullam, Sokho, Azekah, and Yarmuth cited in Joshua 15:35. These valleys formed the border between Philistia and Judea.

== Site and excavation history ==
The site of Khirbet Qeiyafa was surveyed in the 1860s by Victor Guérin who reported the presence of a village on the hilltop. In 1875, British surveyors noted only stone heaps at Kh. Kiafa. In 1932, Dimitri Baramki, reported the site to hold a 35 square metres (380 sq ft) watchtower associated with Khirbet Quleidiya (Horvat Qolad), 200 metres (660 ft) east. The site was mostly neglected in the 20th century and not mentioned by leading scholars. Yehuda Dagan conducted more intense surveys in the 1990s and documented the visible remains. The site raised curiosity in 2005 when Saar Ganor discovered impressive Iron Age structures under the remnants.

Excavations at Khirbet Qeiyafa began in 2007, directed by Yosef Garfinkel of the Hebrew University and Saar Ganor of the Israel Antiquities Authority, and continued in 2008. Nearly 600 square metres (6,500 sq ft) of an Iron Age IIA city were unearthed. Based on pottery styles and four burned olive pits tested for carbon-14 at Oxford University, Garfinkel and Ganor have dated the site to 1050–970 BCE, although Israel Finkelstein contends evidence points to habitation between 1050 and 915 BCE.

The initial excavation by Ganor and Garfinkel took place from August 12 to 26, 2007 on behalf of the Hebrew University of Jerusalem Institute of Archaeology. In their preliminary report at the annual ASOR conference on November 15, they presented a theory that the site was the Biblical Azekah, which until then had been exclusively associated with Tell Zakariya. In 2015 a plan to build a neighborhood on the site was cancelled, to enable the archaeological dig to go forward.

In 2017, Garfinkel claimed that Joseph Silver, the chief funder of the excavation, while walking around the exterior of the city wall in the SE part with Garfinkel and Ganor, identified features in the city wall similar to the features found by Garfinkel and Ganor in the western gate, and stated that it was a second gate. This claim was challenged. In November, with volunteers from the Bnai Akiva youth organization, the area was cleared and an excavation and reconstruction organized by Garfinkel and Ganor "yielded" the existence of that second gate. It was thought that the identification provided a solid basis for identifying the site as biblical Sha'arayim ("two gates" in Hebrew).

Also in 2017, citing publications from 2012 and 2015, Garfinkel lowered the suggested chronology of Khirbet Qeiyafa (Stratum IV) to ca. 1000–975 BCE, considering the site as belonging to Early Iron Age IIA (ca. 1000–930 BCE). Later that year, he adjusted the date range to 1020-980 BCE in a summary remark on all the studies and critiques of the site's dating.

== Debate on United Monarchy ==
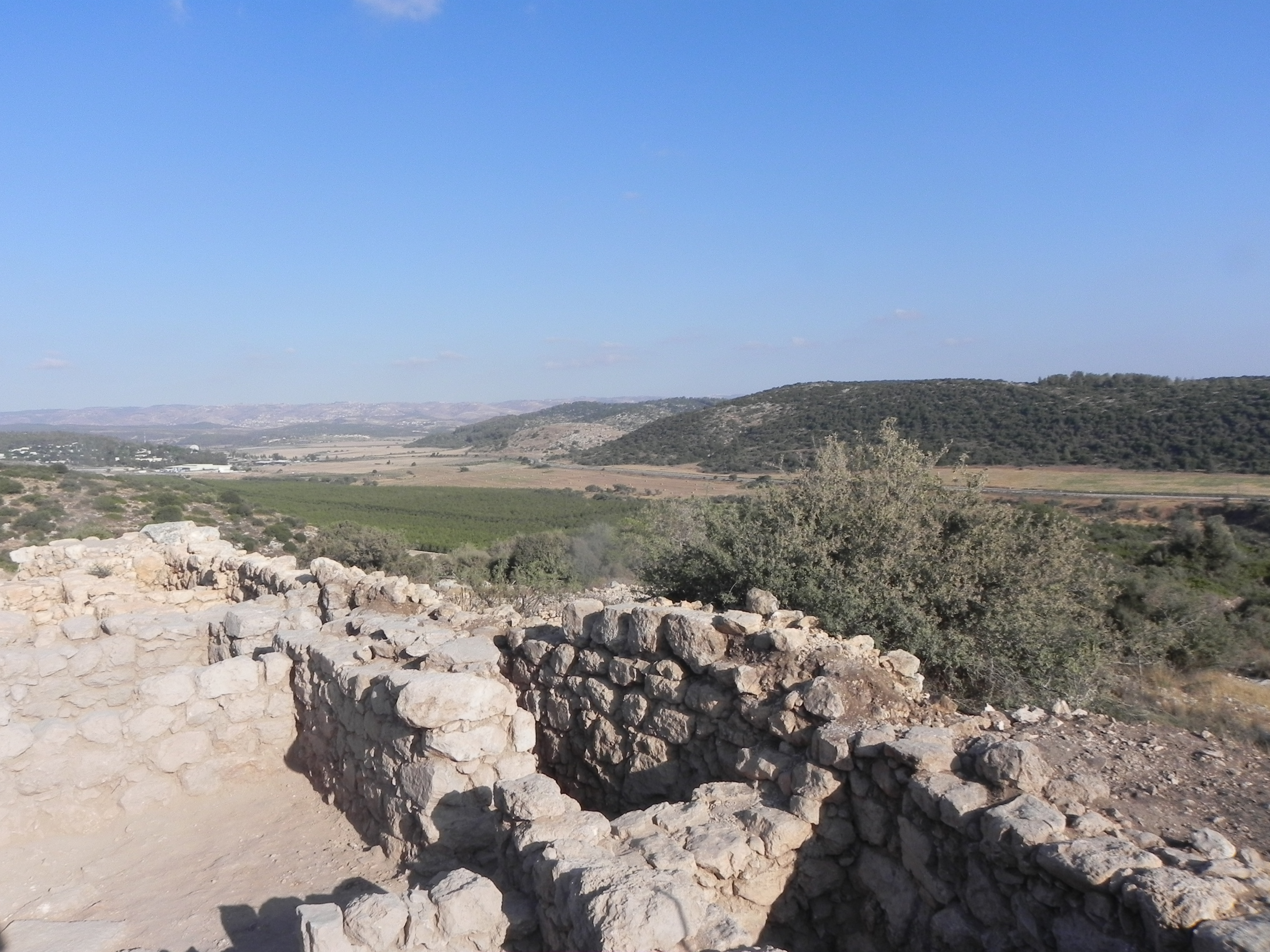
Elah fortress walls

Discoveries at Khirbet Qeiyafa are significant to the debate on archaeological evidence and historicity of the biblical account of the United Monarchy at the beginning of Iron Age II. Nadav Na’aman and Ido Koch held that the ruins were Canaanite, based on strong similarities with the nearby Canaanite excavations at Beit Shemesh. Finkelstein and Alexander Fantalkin, maintained that the site shows affiliations with a North Israelite entity saying that "There is no evidence for arguing that Jerusalem, Hebron and Khirbet Qeiyafa were the main centres of 10th century Judah. ... Between the two possibilities for the territorial affiliation of Khirbet Qeiyafa with a highlands polity—Judah or an early north Israelite entity—the latter seems to us the more attractive one. In 2015 Finkelstein and Piasetsky specifically criticised the previous statistical treatment of radio-carbon dating at Khirbet Qeiyafa and also whether it was prudent to ignore results from neighboring sites.

Archeologists, Yosef Garfinkel, Mitka R. Golub, Haggai Misgav, Michael G. Hasel and Saar Ganor rejected in 2019 the possibility that Khirbet Qeiyafa could be associated with the Philistines. They wrote: "The idea that in this chronological phase the knowledge of writing should be associated with the Philistine city state of Gath can now be rejected. While the various sites in Judah present an impressive assemblage of inscriptions, all we have from the intensive twenty-year excavations at Tell es-Safi (Gath) is one poorly executed inscription of seven letters. Indeed, the city state of Gath, like all other Philistine city states (Ashkelon, Ashdod, Eqron) and all the Canaanite Late Bronze Age city states, managed their administration without the use of writing. On the other hand, the rise of a nation state required the intensification of social, administrative and economic networks and increased the need for communication".

== Identification ==
In 2010, Gershon Galil of the University of Haifa identified Khirbet Qeiyafa as the "Neta'im" of 1 Chronicles 4:23, due to its proximity to Khirbet Ğudrayathe (biblical Gederah). The inhabitants of both cities were said to be "potters" and "in the King's service", a description that is consistent with the archeological discoveries at that site.

Yehuda Dagan of the Israel Antiquities Authority also disagrees with the identification as Sha'arayim. Dagan believes the ancient Philistine retreat route, after their defeat in the battle at the Valley of Elah (1 Samuel 17:52), more likely identifies Sha'arayim with the remains of Khirbet esh-Shari'a. Dagan proposes that Khirbet Qeiyafa be identified with biblical Adithaim (Joshua 15:36). Nadav Na'aman of Tel Aviv University doubts that Sha'arayim means "two gates" at all, citing multiple scholarly opinions that the suffix -ayim in ancient place names is not the dual suffix used for ordinary words.

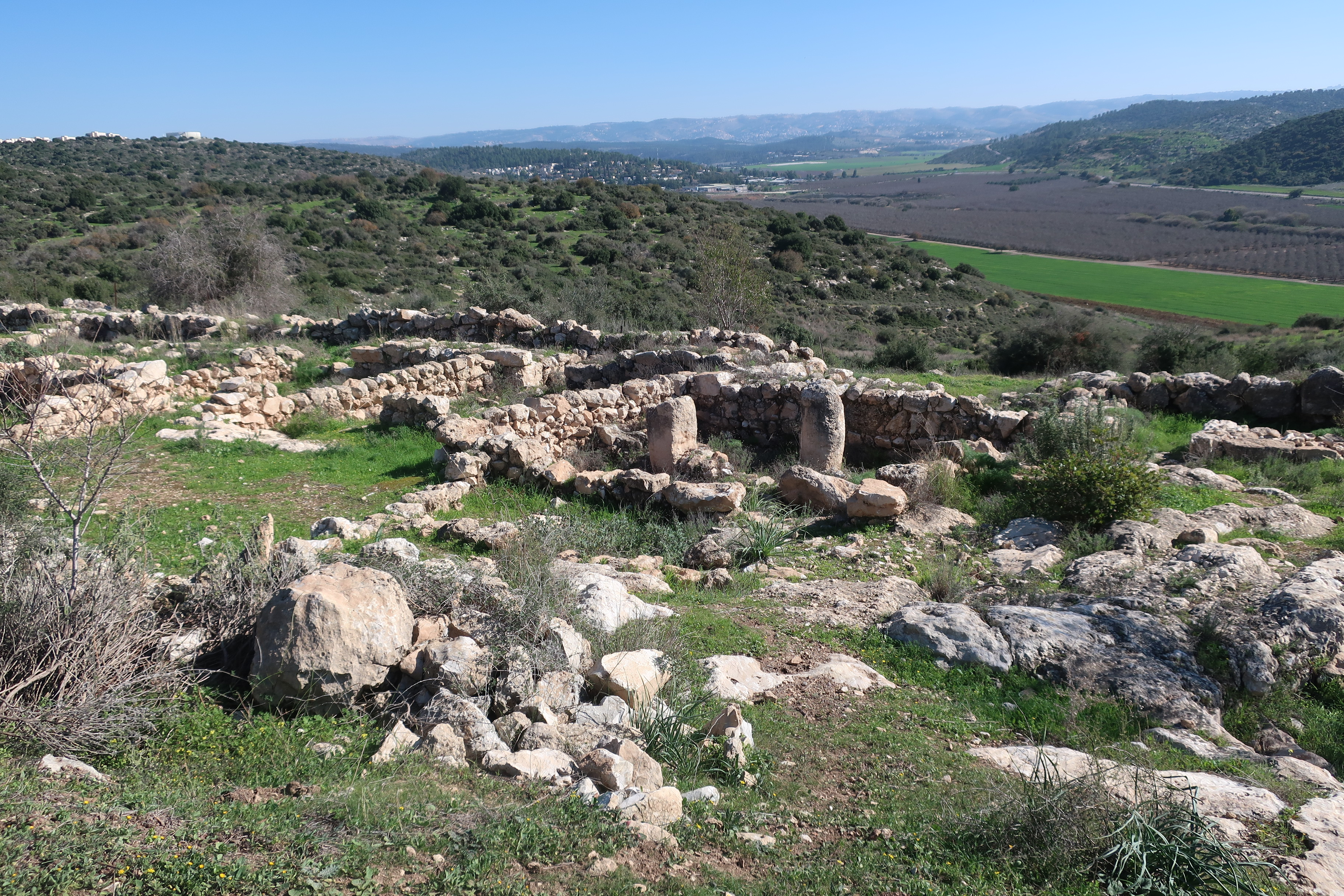
The archaeological ruin, Khirbet Qeiyafa

The fortifications at Khirbet Qeiyafa predate those of contemporary Lachish, Beersheba, Arad, and Timnah. All these sites have yielded pottery dated to early Iron Age II. The parallel valley to the north, mentioned in Samuel I, runs from the Philistine city of Ekron to Tel Beit Shemesh. The city gate of the Elah Fortress faces west with a path down to the road leading to the sea, and was thus named "Gath Gate" or "Sea Gate." The 23-dunam (5.7-acre) site is surrounded by a casement wall and fortifications.

Garfinkel suggests that it was a Judean city with 500–600 inhabitants during the reign of David and Solomon. Based on pottery finds at Qeiyafa and Gath, archaeologists believe the sites belonged to two distinct ethnic groups. "The finds have not yet established who the residents were," says Aren Maeir, a Bar Ilan University archaeologist digging at Gath. "It will become more clear if, for example, evidence of the local diet is found. Excavations have shown that Philistines ate dogs and pigs, while Israelites did not. The nature of the ceramic shards found at the site suggest residents might have been neither Israelites nor Philistines but members of a third, forgotten people." Evidence that the city was not Philistine comes from the private houses that abut the city wall, an arrangement that was not used in Philistine cities. There is also evidence of equipment for baking flat bread and hundreds of bones from goats, cattle, sheep, and fish. Significantly, no pig bones have been uncovered, suggesting that the city was not Philistine or Canaanite. Nadav Na'aman of Tel Aviv University nevertheless associates it with Philistine Gath, citing the necessity for further excavations as well as evidence from Bet Shemesh whose inhabitants also avoided eating pork, yet were associated with Ekron. Na'aman proposed identification with the Philistine city of Gob, whereas Garfinkel wrote that the site may actually point to the biblical Azekah, owing to its proximity to Socho and the valley of Elah that separated the two sites. Yigal Levin has proposed that the ma'gal (מעגל) or "circular camp" of the Israelites which is mentioned in the story of David and Goliath (1 Samuel 17:20) was described this way because it fitted the circular shape of the nearby Khirbet Qeiyafa. Levin argues that the story of David and Goliath is set decades before Khirbet Qeiyafa was built and so the reference to Israel's encampment at the ma'gal probably does "not represent any particular historical event at all". But when the story was composed centuries later, the round structure of Khirbet Qeiyafa "would still have been visible and known to the author of 1 Samuel 17", who "guessed its function, and worked it into his story". Garfinkel and his colleagues have suggested that the identification with the ma'gal is unconvincing as the term is used to refer to a military camp/outpost, whereas Khirbet Qeiyafa was a fortified city.

Benjamin Sass, Professor of Archaeology at Tel Aviv University, analyzed the dating, ethnic and political affiliation of Khirbet Qeiyafa as well as the language of the ostracon. "A dating in the Iron I–II transition, the mid 10th century, assuming the alphabet has just begun its move out of Philistia then could just make a Jerusalem link and Judahite Hebrew language possible for the ostracon. On such a background Qeiyafa may even be considered Davidic. With the oval plan of its casemate wall crowning a summit, Qeiyafa could be assumed to emulate Jerusalem." Sass concludes.

== Archaeological finds ==
=== General outline ===
The site consists of a lower city of about 10 hectares and an upper city of about 3 hectares (7.4 acres) surrounded by a massive defensive wall ranging from 2–4 metres (6 ft 7 in – 13 ft 1 in) tall. The walls are built in the same manner as the walls of Hazor and Gezer, formed by a casemate (a pair of walls with a chamber in between).

At the center of the upper city is a large rectangular enclosure with spacious rooms on the south, equivalent to similar enclosures found at royal cities such as Samaria, Lachish, and Ramat Rachel.

On the southern slope, outside the city, there are Iron Age rock-cut tombs.

The site, according to Garfinkel, has "a town plan characteristic of the Kingdom of Judah that is also known from other sites, e.g., Beit Shemesh, Tell en-Nasbeh, Tell Beit Mirsim and Beersheba. A casemate wall was built at all of these sites and the city’s houses next to it incorporated the casemates as one of the dwelling's rooms. This model is not known from any Canaanite, Philistine or Kingdom of Israel site."

The site is massively fortified, "including the use of stones that weigh up to eight tons apiece."

=== Marked jar handles ===
"500 jar handles bearing a single finger print, or sometimes two or three, were found. Marking jar handles is characteristic of the Kingdom of Judah and it seems this practice has already begun in the early Iron Age IIA."

=== Excavation areas ===
Area "A" extended 5×5 metres and consists of two major layers: Hellenistic above, and Iron Age II below.

Area "B" contains four squares, about 2.5 metres deep from top-soil to bedrock, and also features both Hellenistic and Iron Age layers. Surveys on the surface have also revealed sherds from the early and middle Bronze Ages, as well as from the Persian, Roman, Byzantine, early Islamic, Mameluke and Ottoman periods. The Hellenistic/upper portion of the wall was built with small rocks atop the Iron-II lower portion, consisting of big boulders in a casemate design. Part of a structure identified as a city gate was uncovered, and some of the rocks where the wall meets this gate are estimated to weigh 3 to 5 tons. The lower phase was built of especially large stones, 1–3 meters long, and the heaviest of them weigh 3–5 tons. Atop these stones is a thin wall, c. 1.5 meters thick; small and medium size fieldstones were used in its construction. These two fortification phases rise to a height of 2–3 meters and standout at a distance, evidence of the great effort that was invested in fortifying the place.

=== ʾIšbaʿal inscription ===
In 2012 an inscription in Canaanite alphabetic script was found on the shoulder of a ceramic jar. The inscription read "ʾIšbaʿal [/Ishbaal/Eshbaal] son of Beda" and was dated to the late 11th or 10th century BCE (Iron Age IIA).

=== Khirbet Qeiyafa ostracon ===
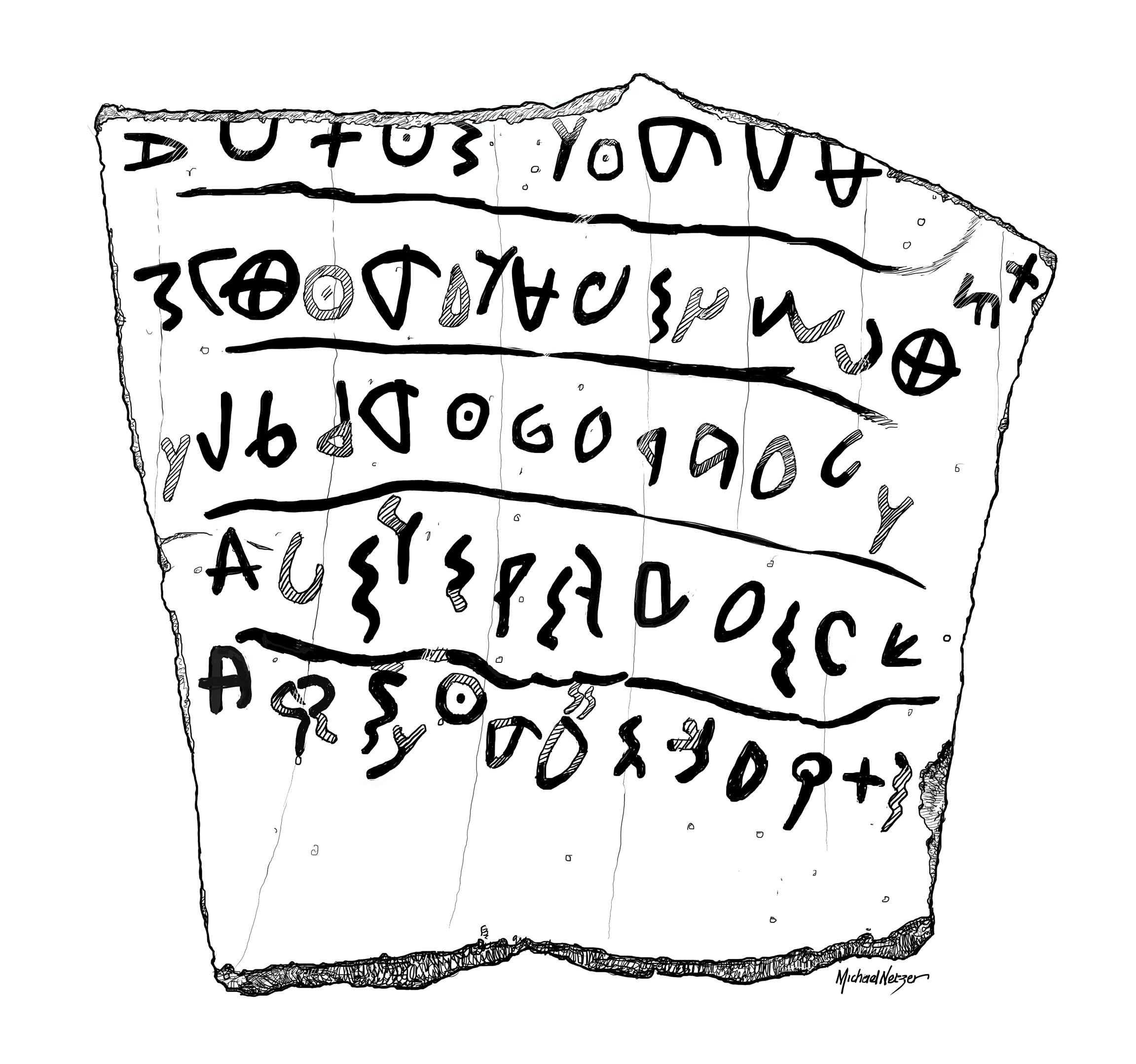
Artist's rendition of the Khirbet Qeiyafa ostracon

=== Shrines ===
==== Rooms used for cultic purposes ====
In May 2012 archeologists announced the discovery of three large rooms that were likely used as cultic shrines. While the Canaanites and Philistines practiced their cults in separate temples and shrines, they did not have separate rooms within the buildings dedicated only to religious rituals. This may suggest that the rooms did not belong to these two cultures. According to Garfinkel the decorations of cultic rooms lack any human figurines. He suggested "that the population of Khirbet Qeiyafa observed at least two biblical bans, on pork and on graven images, and thus practiced a different cult than that of the Canaanites or the Philistines."

==== Portable shrines ====
Three small portable shrines were also discovered. The smaller shrines are boxes shaped with different decorations showing impressive architectonic and decorative styles. Garfinkel suggested the existence of a biblical parallel regarding the existence of such shrines (2 Samuel 6). One of the shrines is decorated with two pillars and a lion. According to Garfinkel, the style and the decoration of these cultic objects are very similar to the Biblical description of some features of Solomon's Temple.

=== Palace and pillared storehouse ===
On July 18, 2013, the Israel Antiquities Authority issued a press release about the discovery of a structure believed to be King David's palace in the Judean Shephelah. The archaeological team uncovered two large buildings dated to the tenth century BCE, one a large palatial structure and the other a pillared store room with hundreds of stamped storage vessels. The claim that the larger structure may be one of King David's palaces led to significant media coverage, while skeptics accused the archaeologists of sensationalism. Aren Maeir, an archaeologist at Bar Ilan University, pointed out that existence of King David's monarchy is still unproven and some scholars believe the buildings could be Philistine or Canaanite. The massive structure located on a hill in the center of the city was decorated with alabaster imported from Egypt. On one side it offered a view of the two city gates, Ashdod and the Mediterranean, and on the other, the Elah Valley. During the Byzantine era, a wealthy farmer built a home on the site, cutting the palace in two.

== See also ==
- Archaeology of Israel
- Biblical archaeology
- Biblical Minimalism

== Bibliography ==
- Conder, C.R.; Kitchener, H.H. (1883). The Survey of Western Palestine: Memoirs of the Topography, Orography, Hydrography, and Archaeology. Vol. 3. London: Committee of the Palestine Exploration Fund.
- Garfinkel, Y. and Ganor, S., "Khirbet Qeiyafa, 2007-2008", Notes and News, IEJ 58:, pp, 243-248, 2008
- Garfinkel, Y. and Ganor, S., "Khirbet Qeiyafa 1. Excavation Report 2007-2008", Jerusalem, 2009, ISBN 978-9652210777
- Archived 2022-10-20 at the Wayback Machine Garfinkel, Y., Ganor, S. and Hasel, M., "Khirbet Qeiyafa 2. Excavation Report 2009-2013 : Stratigraphy and Architecture (Areas B, C, D, E)", Jerusalem, 2014 ISBN 978-965-221-096-8
- Garfinkel, Y. and Kang, H.-G., "Relative and Absolute Chronology of Khirbet Qeiyafa: Very Late Iron Age I or Very Early Iron Age IIA?", IEJ 61:, pp. 171–183, 2011
- Guérin, V. (1869). Description Géographique Historique et Archéologique de la Palestine (in French). Vol. 1: Judee, pt. 3. Paris: L'Imprimerie Nationale.
- Palmer, E.H. (1881). The Survey of Western Palestine: Arabic and English Name Lists Collected During the Survey by Lieutenants Conder and Kitchener, R. E. Transliterated and Explained by E.H. Palmer. Committee of the Palestine Exploration Fund.
- Garfinkel, Yosef; Ganor, Saar; Hasel, Michael (2018). In the Footsteps of King David: Revelations from an Ancient Biblical City (first ed.). Thames & Hudson. ISBN 978-0-500-05201-3.
- Singer-Avitz, L., "The Relative Chronology of Khirbet Qeiyafa", Tel Aviv, 37, pp. 79–83, 2010

== Exhibited artifacts ==
- "In the Valley of David and Goliath." A special exhibition at the Bible Lands Museum in 2016 - 2017.
