= Tell Beit Mirsim =

Archaeological site in Israel

Coordinates: 31.455775°N 34.909846°E

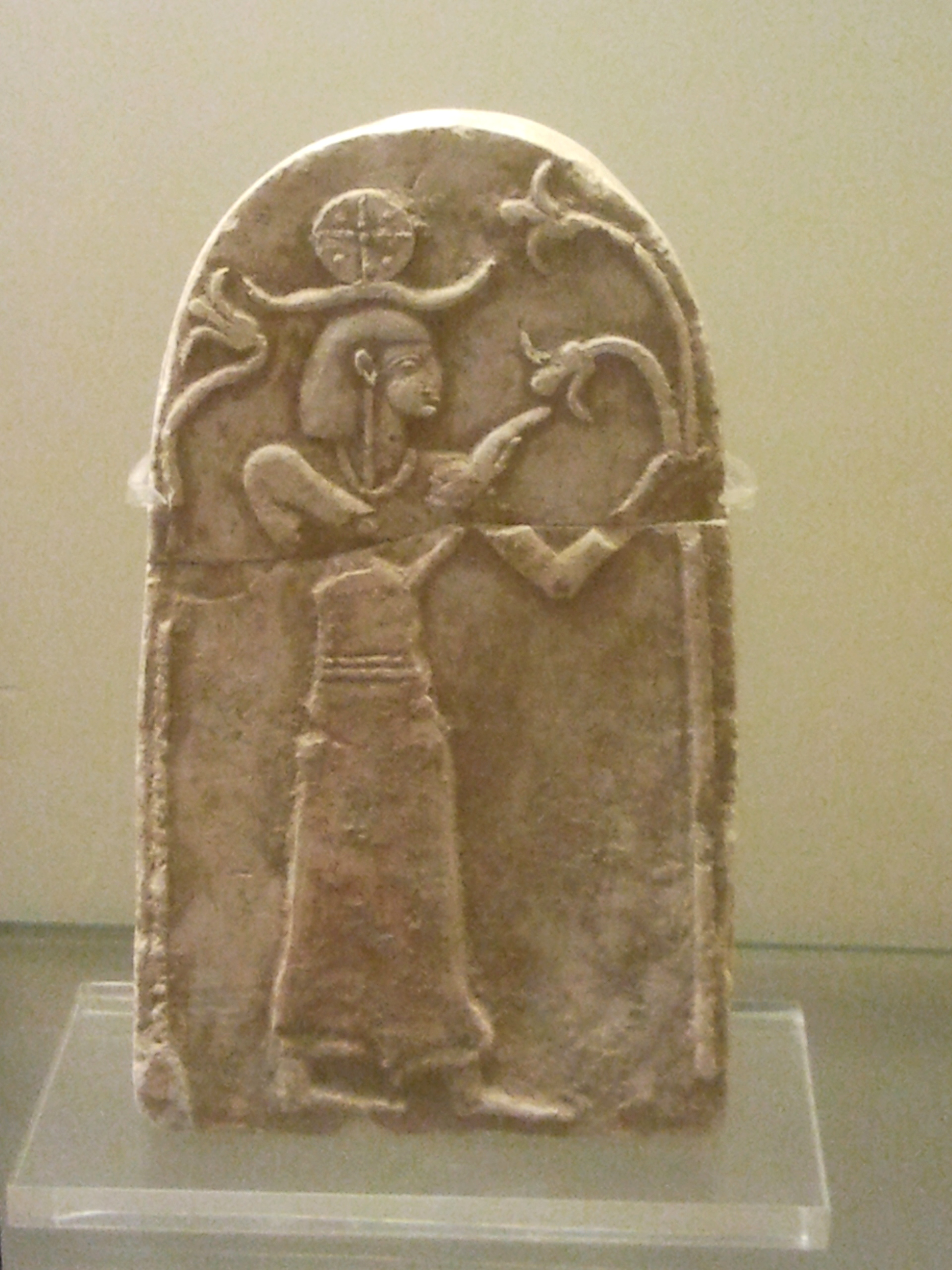
A stela from Tell Beit Mirsim

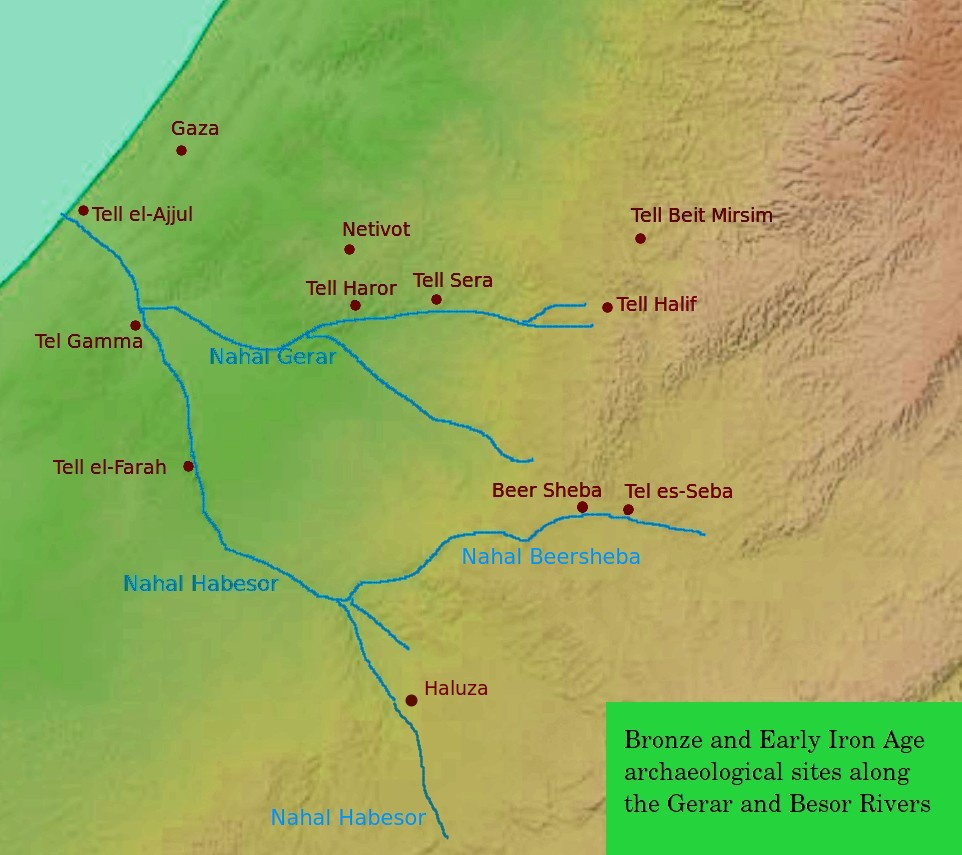
Position of Tell Beit Mirsim among other Bronze and Early Iron Age tells in the area

Tell Beit Mirsim is an archaeological site in central Israel, on the border between the lowlands of Shfela and Mount Hebron. It is located in the eastern region of Lachish about 20 kilometers southwest of Hebron and about 13 kilometers southeast of Lachish.

== Excavations ==
The site was initially excavated for four seasons (1926, 1928, 1930 and 1932) by William F. Albright.

The excavation revealed 10 or 11 strata dating from the late 3rd millennium BC to around 589 BC. The site is of particular importance for the archeology of Israel, since the ceramics in the individual layers were observed particularly well and published quickly. This pottery corpus has long been considered the standard for archeology in the region.

"The strict separation of earth layers, or archaeological sediments, also allowed the strict separation of ceramic assemblages".

Gustaf Dalman examined the ruin in the early 20th-century and described what he saw there as installations used in the production of olive oil, a view later corroborated by Israeli archaeologist David Eitam.

The Hebrew University of Jerusalem led further excavations in 2023 and 2024, uncovering a four-room house and an olive oil press.

== History ==
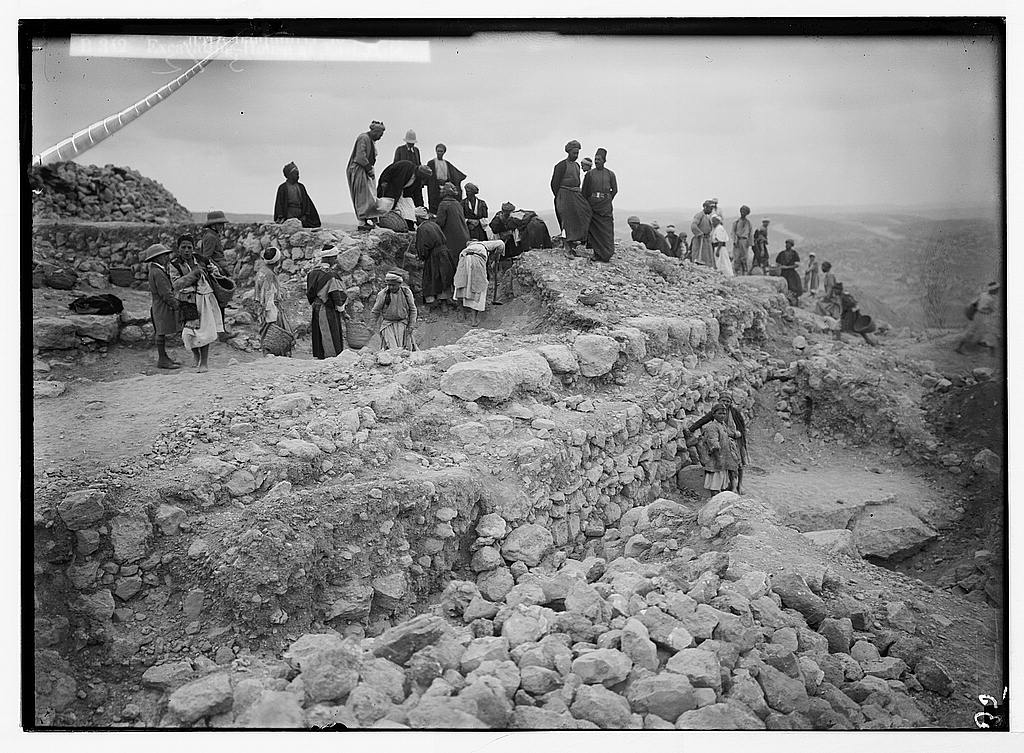
Excavations at Tell Beit Mirsim in 1926. Excavating the house at east gate

=== Early Bronze Age ===
Tell Beit Mirsim J (EB IIIB)

Tell Beit Mirsim I (EB IV) in the intermediate period.

=== Middle Bronze Age ===
Tell Beit Mirsim H (MB I) a modest walled town.

Tell Beit Mirsim G-F (MB IIA; c. 1820 BCE). In Stratum G powerful fortiications.

Tell Beit Mirsim E (MB IIB). Corresponding to the early Hyksos period (MB IIB2).

Tell Beit Mirsim D (MB IIC; c. 1590-1550 BCE). Corresponding to the late Hyksos period.

=== Late Bronze Age ===
Tell Beit Mirsim C (LB I-II).

=== Iron Age ===
==== Iron I ====
Tell Beit Mirsim Stratum B (Iron I).

==== Iron II: Kingdom of Judah ====
Tell Beit Mirsim Stratum A (Iron II). In the 10th century BCE (Iron IIA) onwards, the site has "a town plan characteristic of the Kingdom of Judah that is also known from other sites" including Beit Shemesh, Tell en-Nasbeh, Khirbet Qeiyafa and Beersheba.

"A casemate wall was built at all of these sites and the city’s houses next to it incorporated the casemates as one of the dwelling’s rooms. This model is not known from any Canaanite, Philistine or Kingdom of Israel site."

In the 9th and 8th centuries BCE, it was a town of c. 700 people, according to archaeologist William G. Dever.

== Identification of the site ==
Albright identified the ruin with the biblical city Dvir (Debir), or Kiryat Sefer by another name. He hoped to find an ancient archive there. This identification is not currently accepted by the archaeological community. Khirbet Rabud is seen as the more likely location.

== Bibliography ==
- Conder, C.R.; Kitchener, H.H. (1883). The Survey of Western Palestine: Memoirs of the Topography, Orography, Hydrography, and Archaeology. Vol. 3. London: Committee of the Palestine Exploration Fund. (pp. 279, 290)
- Ganor, Sa‘ar; Weiss, Shifra; Aladjem, Emil (2019-08-12). "Tell Beit Mirsim (South)" (131). Hadashot Arkheologiyot – Excavations and Surveys in Israel.
- Gedy, Miki Ein; Golan, Karni (2007-01-14). "Tell Beit Mirsim" (119). Hadashot Arkheologiyot – Excavations and Surveys in Israel.
- Guérin, V. (1869). Description Géographique Historique et Archéologique de la Palestine (in French). Vol. 1: Judee, pt. 2. Paris: L'Imprimerie Nationale. (p. 349)
- Palmer, E. H. (1881). The Survey of Western Palestine: Arabic and English Name Lists Collected During the Survey by Lieutenants Conder and Kitchener, R. E. Transliterated and Explained by E.H. Palmer. Committee of the Palestine Exploration Fund. (p. 379)
