= Azekah =

Ruins of an ancient town in Israel

- עזקה (Hebrew)
- Tel Azeka, Tell Zakariya
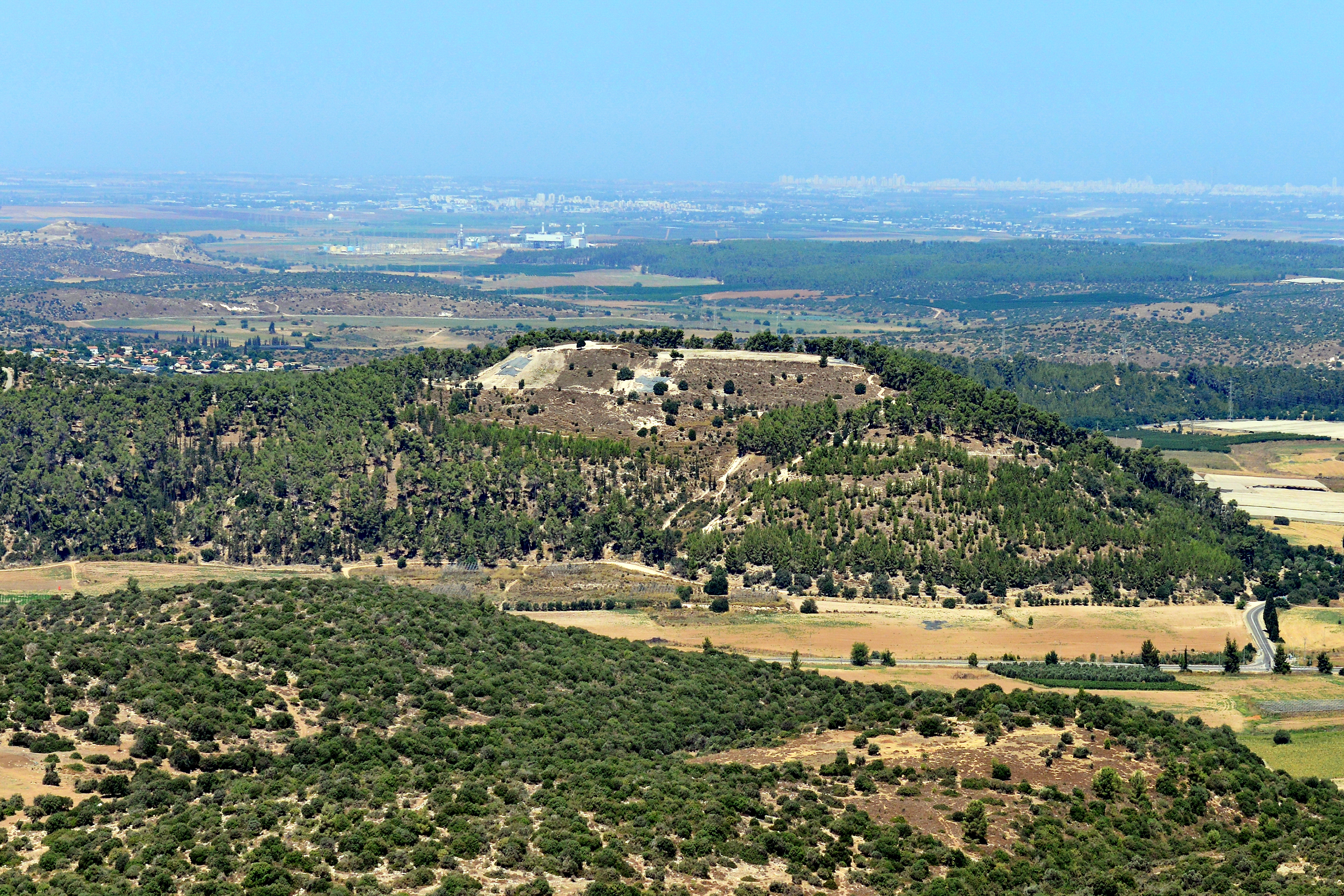
- Tel Azekah

- Location within Israel
- 31°42′01″N 34°56′09″E
- Type: settlement
- Location: Israel
- Region: Shfela
- Part of: Kingdom of Judah
- Grid position: 144123 PAL

Azekah (Hebrew: עֲזֵקָה, ʿazēqā) was an ancient town in the Shephela ("lowlands of Judea") guarding the upper reaches of the Valley of Elah, about 26 km (16 mi) northwest of Hebron.

The current tell (ruin) by that name, also known as Tel Azekah (Hebrew: תל עזקה, ʿtel azēqā) or Tell Zakariya, has been identified with the biblical Azekah, dating back to the Canaanite period. Today, the site lies on the purlieu of Britannia Park.

According to Epiphanius of Salamis, the name meant "white" in Hebrew. The tell is pear shaped with the tip pointing northward. Due to its location in the Elah Valley it functioned as one of the main Judahite border cities, sitting on the boundary between the lower and higher Shfela. Although listed in Joshua 15:35 as being a city in the plain, it is actually partly in the hill country, partly in the plain.

== Biblical history ==
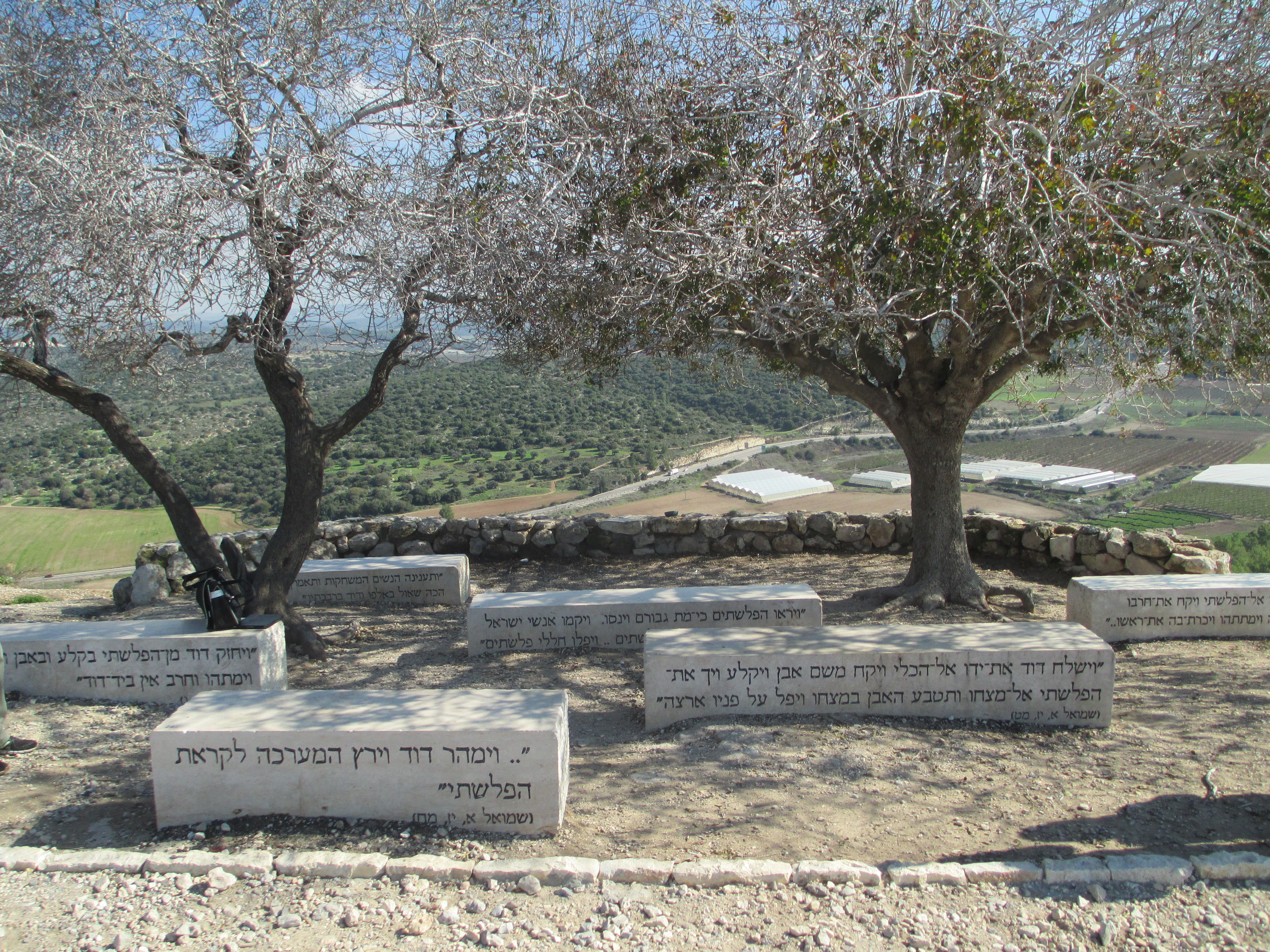
Lookout with biblical verses

=== Joshua ===
In the Bible, it is said to be one of the places where the Amorite kings were defeated by Joshua, and one of the places their army was destroyed by a hailstorm (Joshua 10:10–11). It was given to the tribe of Judah (Joshua 15:20).

=== Samuel ===
In the time of Saul, the Philistines massed their forces between Sokho and Azekah, putting forth Goliath as their champion (1 Samuel 17).

=== Later ===
Rehoboam fortified the town in his reign, along with Lachish and other strategic sites (2 Chronicles 11:5–10). In a clay tablet inscribed in Assyrian script Azekah is mentioned as being a fortified town, during the time of Sennacherib's military excursion in the country.

Lachish and Azekah were the last two towns to fall to the Babylonians before the overthrow of Jerusalem itself (Jeremiah 34:6–7). It was one of the places re-occupied by the people on the return from the Captivity (Nehemiah 11:30).

== Identification ==
Although the hill is now widely known as the Tel (ruin) of Azekah, in the early 19th century the hilltop ruin was known locally by the name of Tell Zakariyeh. J. Schwartz was the first to identify the hilltop ruin of Tell-Zakariyeh as the site of Azekah on the basis of written sources. Schwartz's view was supported by archaeologist William F. Albright, by R.A. Stewart Macalister, and by 1953, the Government Naming Committee in Israel had already decided upon giving the name "Tel Azekah" to Khirbet Tall Zakariya.

In 1838, British-American explorer Edward Robinson passed by the site of Tell Zakariyeh, which stood to the left of the modern village bearing the same name (Az-Zakariyya, which was depopulated in 1948 and later settled by the moshav Zekharia). French explorer Victor Guérin thought another "Beit Zecharias" to be the village mentioned in the Book of I Maccabees (6:32), and which he locates further to the east at a place called Beit Zakaria (Beit Skaria), a view also held by C.R. Conder who thought the site of the battle between Judas Maccabeus and the Grecian army was in none other than the more easterly Beit Skaria. C.W.M. van de Velde who visited the site between 1851 and 1852 held the view that this Tell Zakariya and its adjacent Kefr Zakariya are not the same as Josephus' Beit Zacharia, where Judas Maccabeus engaged the invading Grecian army. The matter, however, remains disputed.

"As for Azekah," Guérin writes, "it has not yet been found with certainty, this name appearing to have disappeared." Scholars believe that the town's old namesake (Azekah) can be seen in its modern-day corruption, "az-Zakariyeh". In contrast, Conder of the Palestine Exploration Fund had strong reservations about connecting the site Tell Zakariya with the biblical Azekah.

In the mosaic layout of the Madaba Map of the 6th century CE (ca. 565 CE), the site is mentioned in conjoined Greek uncials: Το[ποθεσία] του Αγίου Ζαχαρίου, Βεθζαχαρ[ίου] (= [The] site of St. Zacharias, Beth Zachar[ias]). Epiphanius of Salamis writes that, in his day, Azekah was already called by the Syriac name Ḥǝwarta.

Modern Israeli archaeologists have noted that, because of the existence of an adjacent ruin now known as Khirbet Qeiyafa, and which is situated opposite Socho, not to mention the site's "unusual size and the nature of the fortifications," that there are good grounds to suggest that the site in question may actually point to the biblical Azekah.

== Iron Age ==
=== Iron II ===
Azekah, known to have been built on a mountain ridge, is mentioned in two sources outside of the Bible. A text from the Assyrian king Sennacherib describes Azekah and its destruction during his military campaign.

(3) […Ashur, my lord, encourage]ed me and against the land of Ju[dah I marched. In] the course of my campaign, the tribute of the kings of Philistia? I received…
(4) […with the mig]ht of Ashur, my lord, the province of [Hezek]iah of Judah like […
(5) […] the city of Azekah, his stronghold, which is between my [bo]rder and the land of Judah […
(6) [like the nest of the eagle? ] located on a mountain ridge, like pointed iron daggers without number reaching high to heaven […
(7) [Its walls] were strong and rivaled the highest mountains, to the (mere) sight, as if from the sky [appears its head? …
(8) [by means of beaten (earth) ra]mps, mighty? battering rams brought near, the work of […], with the attack by foot soldiers, [my] wa[rriors…
(9) […] they had seen [the approach of my cav]alry and they had heard the roar of the mighty troops of the god Ashur and [their] he[arts] became afraid […
(10) [The city Azekah I besieged,] I captured, I carried off its spoil, I destroyed, I devastated, [I burned] with fire…

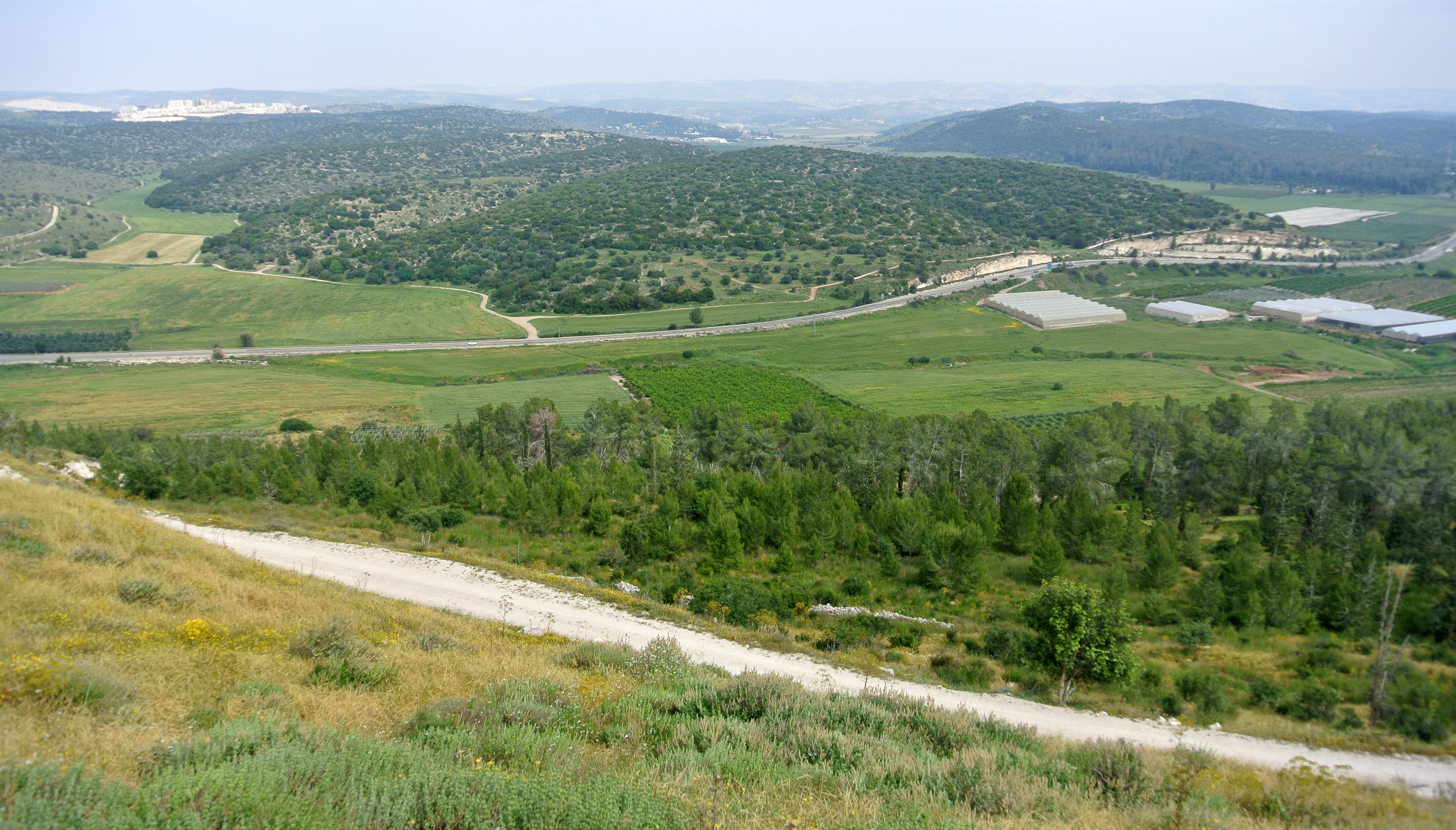
Valley of Elah viewed from the top of Tel Azeka.

Azekah is also mentioned in one of the Lachish letters. Lachish Letter 4 suggests that Azekah was destroyed, as they were no longer visible to the exporter of the letter. Part of the otracon reads:

"And inasmuch as my lord sent to me concerning the matter of Bet Harapid, there is no one there. And as for Semakyahu, Semayahu took him and brought him up to the city. And your servant is not sending him there any[more -], but when morning comes round [-]. And may (my lord) be apprised that we are watching for the fire signals of Lachish according to all the signs which my lord has given, because we cannot see Azeqah."

=== Tell Zakariya ===
Conder and Kitchener, citing Sozomenus (Rel. Pal., p. 753), mention the non-biblical site of Caphar Zachariah (Greek: Χαφάρ Ζαχαρία) being in the region of Eleutheropolis, and conclude that this would point to the village Zakariya near Tell Zakariya. Theodosius, archdeacon and pilgrim to the Holy Land, produced a Latin map and itinerary of his travels in Palestine, entitled De Situ Terrae Sanctae ca. 518–530, in which he wrote: "De Eleutheropoli usque in locum, ubi iacet sanctus Zacharias, milia VI" [= "From Beit Gubrin, as far as to the place where lies the holy [prophet], Zechariah, there are 6 milestones"]. Israeli archaeologist Yoram Tsafrir has identified this "resting place of the holy Zechariah" with the nearby Arab village of the same name, Az-Zakariyya, north of Beit Gubrin. Tsafrir notes that Theodosius' location corresponds with the "Beth Zechariah" inscribed on the Madaba Map, and which site is placed alongside of Saphitha (now Kh. es-Safi). J. Gildemeister reasons that one can ask whether it (Kefar Zakariah) is the same place that appears in distorted forms (e.g. Beit Zachariah) in other writings. Robinson thought that Zakariyeh, as applied to a village, referred here to the site of the Caphar Zechariæ mentioned by Sozomen in the region of Eleutheropolis. Most scholars point to the other Khirbet Beit Zakariyyah, towards the east (grid 1617.1190), as the burial place of the said Zachariah, having been found there the ruins of a Byzantine church now turned mosque, and which church is thought to be featured in the Madaba Map.

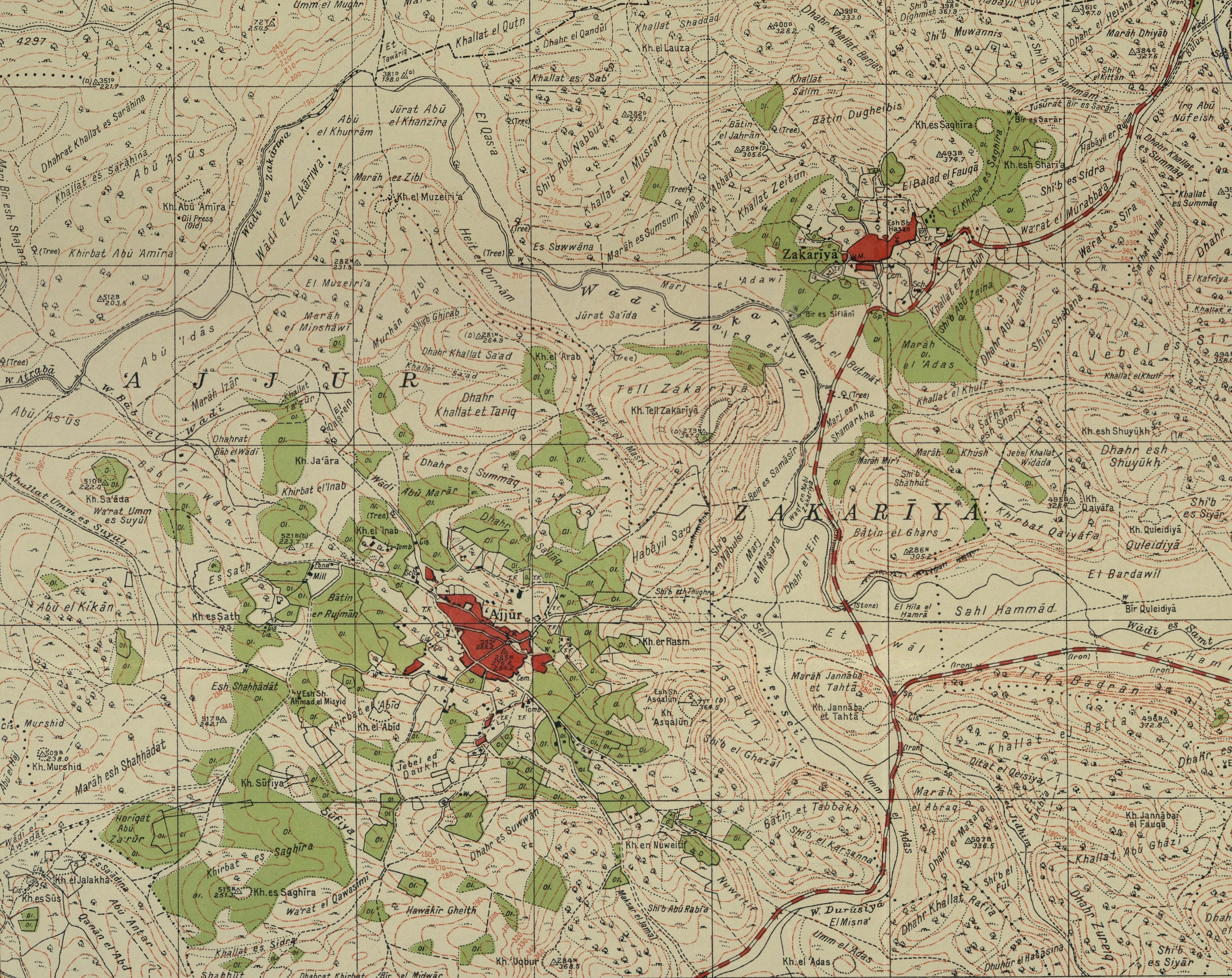
Kh. Tell Zakariya in 1947

== Excavations ==
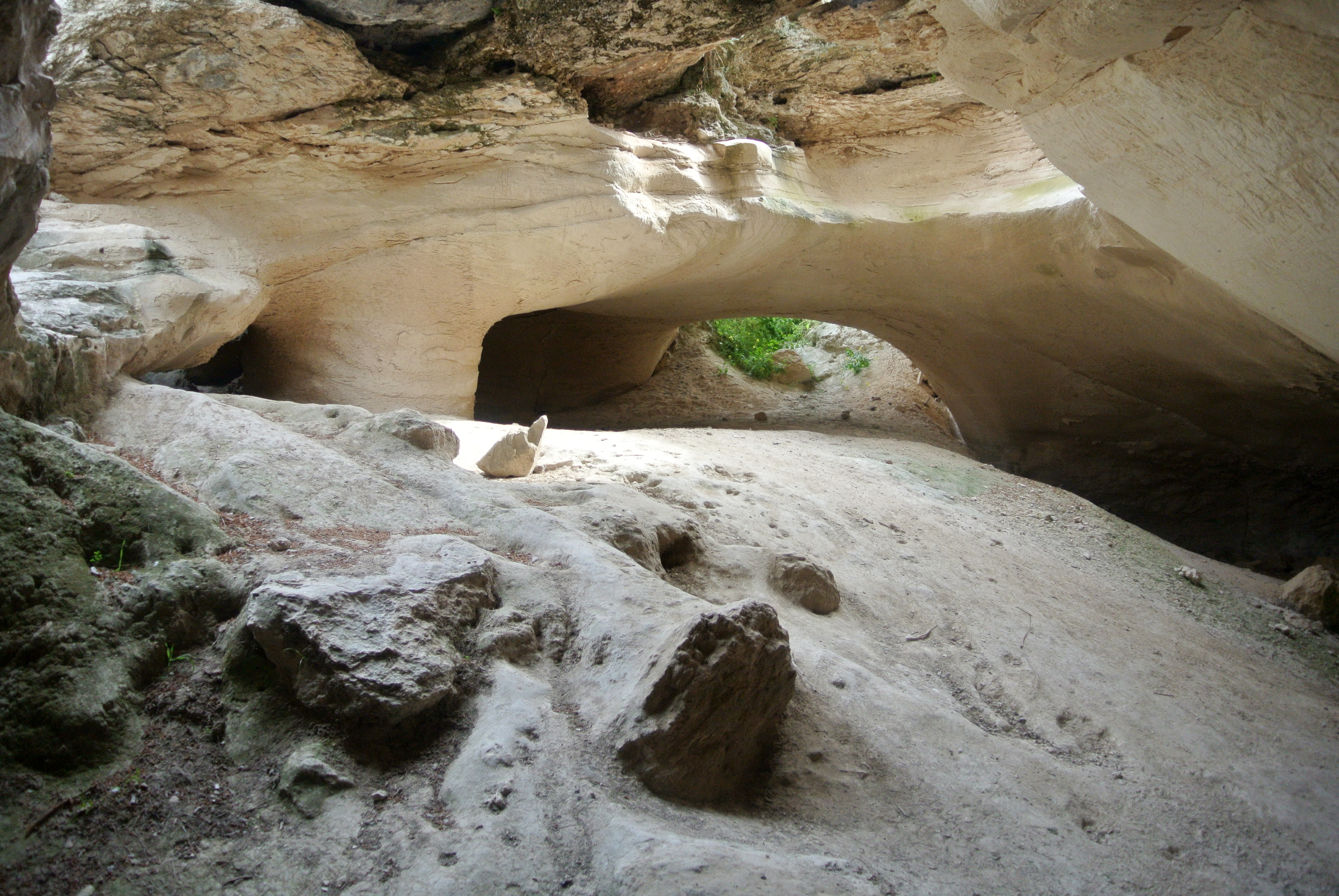
Cave under Tel Azeka.

PEF researcher, C.W. Wilson, concluded in 1899 that Tell Zakariya was occupied at an early pre-Israelite period, and that it was probably deserted soon after the Roman occupation. The wall which encircles the old ruin shows signs of having been several times rebuilt. In cut and design, the stones appear to have been of Maccabean construction.

PEF surveyors, Conder and Kitchener, described the ruin in their magnum opus, the Survey of Western Palestine, saying that they noted on the south-side of the summit an ancient olive-press, among other ruins.

Excavations by the English archaeologists Frederick J. Bliss and R. A. Stewart Macalister in the period 1897–1900 at Tel Azekah revealed a fortress, water systems, hideout caves used during Bar Kokhba revolt and other antiquities, such as LMLK seals. The principal areas of excavation were on the summit's southwestern extremity, where were found the foundations of three towers; the southeastern corner of the tell, where the fortress was located and built primarily of hewn stones; and at an experimental pit located in the center of the summit. Azekah was one of the first sites excavated in the Holy Land and was excavated under the Palestine Exploration Fund for a period of 17 weeks over the course of three seasons. At the close of their excavation Bliss and Macalister refilled all of their excavation trenches in order to preserve the site. The site is located on the grounds of a Jewish National Fund park, Britannia Park.

In 2008 and 2010, a survey of the site was conducted by Oded Lipschits, Yuval Gadot, and Shatil Imanuelov, on behalf of Tel-Aviv University's Institute of Archaeology.

The Lautenschläger Azekah Expedition, part of the regional Elah Valley Project, commenced in the summer of 2012. It is directed by Prof. Oded Lipschits of the Institute of Archaeology of Tel Aviv University, together with Dr Yuval Gadot of TAU and with Prof. Manfred Oeming of Heidelberg University. and is a consortium of over a dozen universities from Europe, North America, and Australia. In its first season 300 volunteers worked for six weeks and uncovered walls, installations, and many hundreds of artifacts. As part of the Jewish National Fund park, whenever possible structures will be conserved and displayed to the public. In April, 2025, it was announced that a three-year-old Israeli toddler stumbled upon a 3,800 year old Canaanite seal near Tel Azeka.

== See also ==
- Archaeology of Israel
- List of cities of the ancient Near East
- Azekah Inscription
- Siege of Azekah

== Bibliography ==
- Ahituv, S. [in Hebrew] (2008). Echoes from the past: Hebrew and cognate inscriptions from the biblical period. Translated by Anson F. Rainey. Jerusalem: Carta. ISBN 9789652207081.
- Albright, W.F. (1921–1922). "Contribution to the Historical Geography of Palestine". The Annual of the American Schools of Oriental Research. 2–3. New Haven: Yale University Press: 14. doi:10.2307/3768450. JSTOR 3768450.
- Amit, David (n.d.). "Tell Azekah". In Ben-Yosef, Sefi (ed.). Israel Guide - Judaea (A useful encyclopedia for the knowledge of the country) (in Hebrew). Vol. 9. Jerusalem: Keter Publishing House, in affiliation with the Israel Ministry of Defence. OCLC 745203905.
- Conder, C.R. (1879). Tent Work in Palestine. Vol. 1. London: Bentley on behalf of the Palestine Exploration Fund. OCLC 874358311.
- Conder, C.R.; Kitchener, H. H. (1882). The Survey of Western Palestine: Memoirs of the Topography, Orography, Hydrography, and Archaeology. Vol. 2. London: Committee of the Palestine Exploration Fund.
- Conder, C.R. (1900). "Notes on the October 'Quarterly Statement'". Quarterly Statement - Palestine Exploration Fund. 32.
- Donner, Herbert [in German] (1995). The Mosaic Map of Madaba: An Introductory Guide. Palaestina Antiqua 7 (2 ed.). Kampen, the Netherlands: Peeters Publishers / Kok Pharos Publishing House. p. 22. ISBN 90-390-0011-5. OCLC 636083006.
- Epiphanius (1935). James Elmer Dean (ed.). Epiphanius' Treatise on Weights and Measures - The Syriac Version. Chicago: University of Chicago Press. OCLC 123314338.
- Freedman, David Noel, ed. (1992), The Anchor Bible Dictionary, vol. 1, New York
- Gadot, Yuval; Lipschits, Oded (2012). "TEL AZEKAH 113 YEARS AFTER Preliminary Evaluation of the Renewed Excavations at the Site". Near Eastern Archaeology. 75 (4): 196–206. doi:10.5615/neareastarch.75.4.0196. S2CID 163653449.
- Garfinkel, Yossi; Ganor, Sa’ar (n.d.). "Horvat Qeiyafa: The Fortification of the Border of the Kingdom of Judah". Israel Antiquities Authority.
- Government Naming Committee (1953), "State of Israel Records", Collection of Publications, no. 277 (PDF) (in Hebrew), Jerusalem: Government of Israel
- Guérin, Victor (1869). Description Géographique Historique et Archéologique de la Palestine (in French). Vol. 1: Judee, pt. 3. Paris: L'Imprimerie Nationale.
- Klein, S. (1915). "Hebräische Ortsnamen bei Josephus (Hebrew place names in Josephus)". Monatsschrift für Geschichte und Wissenschaft des Judentums (in German). 59 (7/9): 156–169. JSTOR 23080489.
- Macalister, R.A. Stewart (1899). "The Rock-Cuttings of Tell Zakariya". Quarterly Statement. 31. PEF: 25–36.
- Na'aman, Nadav [in Hebrew] (1974). "Sennacherib's 'Letter to God' on His Campaign to Judah". Bulletin of the American Schools of Oriental Research. 214 (214): 25–39. doi:10.2307/1356102. ISSN 0003-097X. JSTOR 1356102. OCLC 5546206597. S2CID 163389832. (from Lipschitz, Tel Azekah 113)
- Notley, R.S.; Safrai, Z., eds. (2005). Eusebius, Onomasticon: The Place Names of Divine Scripture. Boston / Leiden: E.J. Brill. ISBN 0-391-04217-3. OCLC 927381934.
- Rainey, A.F. (1983). "The Biblical Shephelah of Judah". Bulletin of the American Schools of Oriental Research. 251 (251). The University of Chicago Press on behalf of The American Schools of Oriental Research: 1–22. doi:10.2307/1356823. JSTOR 1356823. S2CID 163604987.
- Robinson, E.; Smith, E. (1856). Biblical Researches in Palestine, and in the Adjacent Regions. Journal of Travels in the Year 1838. Vol. 2. London / Boston: Crocker & Brewster. OCLC 425957927.
- Romanoff, Paul (1935–1936). "Onomasticon of Palestine". Proceedings of the American Academy for Jewish Research. 7. American Academy for Jewish Research: 147–227. doi:10.2307/3622261. JSTOR 3622261.
- Sozomen (1855). The Ecclesiastical History of Sozomen: Comprising a History of the Church from A.D. 324 to A.D. 440. Henry G. Bohn. ISBN 9780790565682. OCLC 78734887.
- Theodosius the archdeacon (1882). J. Gildemeister (ed.). Theodosius de situ Terrae sanctae im ächten Text und der Breviarius de Hierosolyma (Theodosius on places of the Holy Land). Bonn: Adolph Marcus. OCLC 401990911.
- Tsafrir, Y. (1986). "The Maps Used by Theodosius: On the Pilgrim Maps of the Holy Land and Jerusalem in the Sixth Century C. E." Dumbarton Oaks Papers. 40. Dumbarton Oaks, Trustees for Harvard University: 129–145. doi:10.2307/1291534. JSTOR 1291534.
- van de Velde, C.W.M. (1858). Memoir to Accompany the Map of the Holy Land. Gotha: Justus Perthes.
- Vilnay, Z. (1954). "Identification of Talmudic Place Names". The Jewish Quarterly Review. 45 (2). University of Pennsylvania Press: 130–140. doi:10.2307/1452901. JSTOR 1452901.
- Wilson, Charles W. (1899). "A Visit to Tell Zakariya". Quarterly Statement - Palestine Exploration Fund. 31.
- Zenger, Erich (2008). Einleitung in das Alte Testament (in German). Stuttgart: W. Kohlhammer. ISBN 978-3-17-020695-3.
