= Saar Ganor =

Israeli archaeologist

Saar Ganor (Hebrew: סער גנור) is an Israeli archaeologist. He was the director, along with Yosef Garfinkel, of excavations at Khirbet Qeiyafa, thought to be Biblical Sha'arayim. He is inspector for the Israel Antiquities Authority and a lecturer at the Hebrew University of Jerusalem.

Ganor noticed the unusual scale of the walls at Khirbet Qeiyafa while patrolling the area in 2003. Three years later he persuaded Garfinkel to take a look, and, after a preliminary dig in 2007, they began work in earnest in the summer of 2008. They have excavated only 4 percent of the six-acre settlement so far.

== Excavations ==
- Khirbet Qeiyafa
