= Sokho =

Archaeological sites in Israel mentioned in the Bible

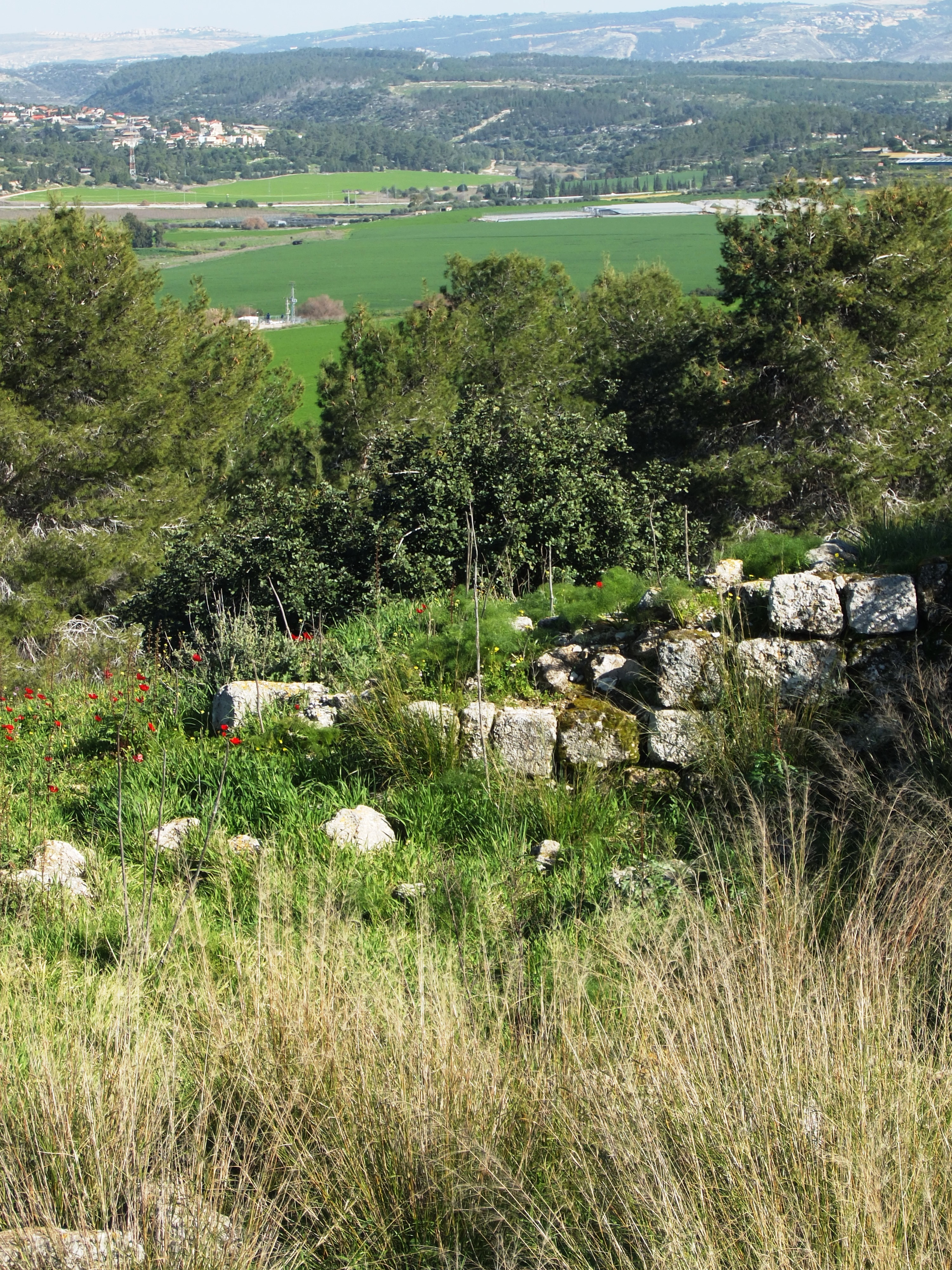
- Stone wall at Tel Socho, Elah Valley, 2015

- Location within Israel
- 31.682108°N 34.973866°E
- Location: Israel
- Grid position: 147/121 PAL

Site notes
- Condition: Ruin

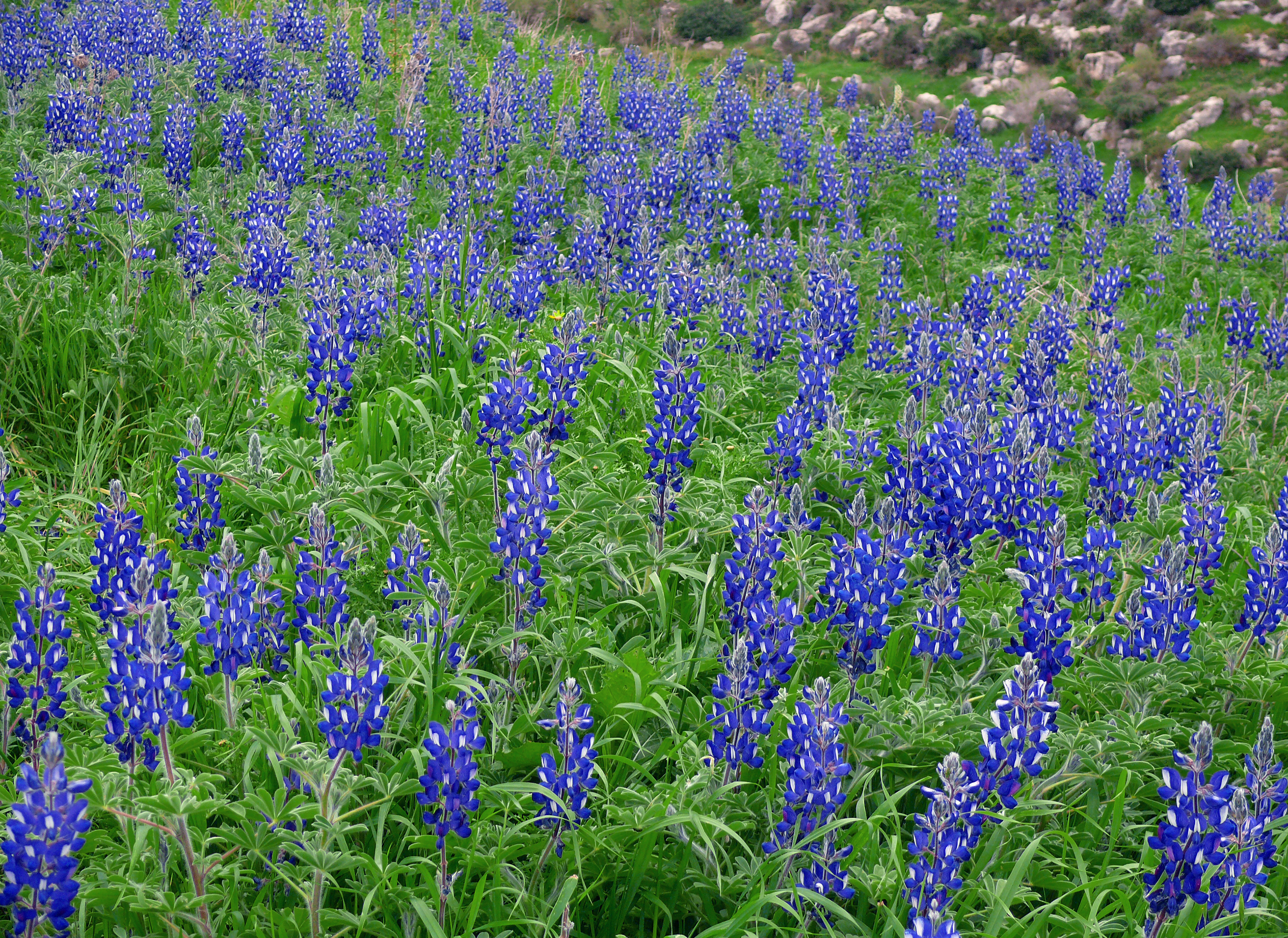
Blue Lupines at Tel Socho

Sokho or Sochoh (Hebrew: שׂוֹכֹה ,שׂוֹכוֹ ,שֹׂכֹה) is the name given to two ancient towns in the territorial domain of Judah as mentioned in the Hebrew Bible, west of the Judean hills. Both towns were given the name Shuweikah in Arabic, a diminutive of the Arabic shawk, meaning "thorn". The remains of both have since been identified.

One is located about 10 miles (16 km) southwest of Hebron and has been identified with the twin ruins known as Khirbet Shuwaikah Fauka and Tahta (Upper and Lower Shuwaikah), 6 kilometres (3.7 mi) southwest of As-Samu in the Hebron Hills district (grid position 150/091 PAL)(Joshua 15:48). Eusebius makes mention of this twin site in his Onomasticon.

The other ruin is situated on a hilltop overlooking the Elah Valley between Adullam and Azekah (Joshua 15:35), in the lower stratum of the Judaean foothills (grid position 147/121 PAL). Today it is a popular tourist attraction better known as Givat HaTurmusim. The site, occupied as early as the Iron Age, was visited by Claude Conder in 1881, who writes that it was already a ruin in his days, with two wells in the valley towards the west.

A third town by this name, Shuwaykah, was located in the Hefer region (1 Kings 4:10), north of Tulkarm (grid position 153/194 PAL).

== Antiquity ==
Although it is listed in Joshua 15:35 as being a city in the plain, Socho is actually partly in the hill country and partly in the plain. The biblical account states that the Philistines encamped between Sokho and Azekah in the Valley of Elah before Goliath's historic encounter with David, the son of Jesse (1 Samuel 17:1). David slew the Philistine giant with a stone slung from a shepherd's sling. Rehoboam fortified the place (2 Chronicles 11:7), but it is not clear which of the two sites is referred to. Socho was one of the cities occupied temporarily by the Philistines in the time of Ahaz (2 Chronicles 28:18).

The word "Sokho" appears on certain LMLK seals during the Judean monarchy. It is believed by many scholars to be one of four cities that acted in some administrative capacity.

The Mishnaic Rabbi Antigonus of Sokho, mentioned in Ethics of the Fathers (Pirkei Avot 1:3), likely came from the Hebron-region town. Rabbi Levi Sukia, of the first generation of Amoraim, also came from Sokho (Jerusalem Talmud, Eruvim).

In Byzantine times, Eusebius described Sokho (Σοκχωθ) as a double village at the ninth milestone between Eleutheropolis (Bet Guvrin) and Jerusalem (Eusebius, Onomasticon 156:18 ff.), which would correspond to the Elah Valley location. The 6th-century Madaba Map also depicts Sokho (Σωκω).

== Givat HaTurmusim ==
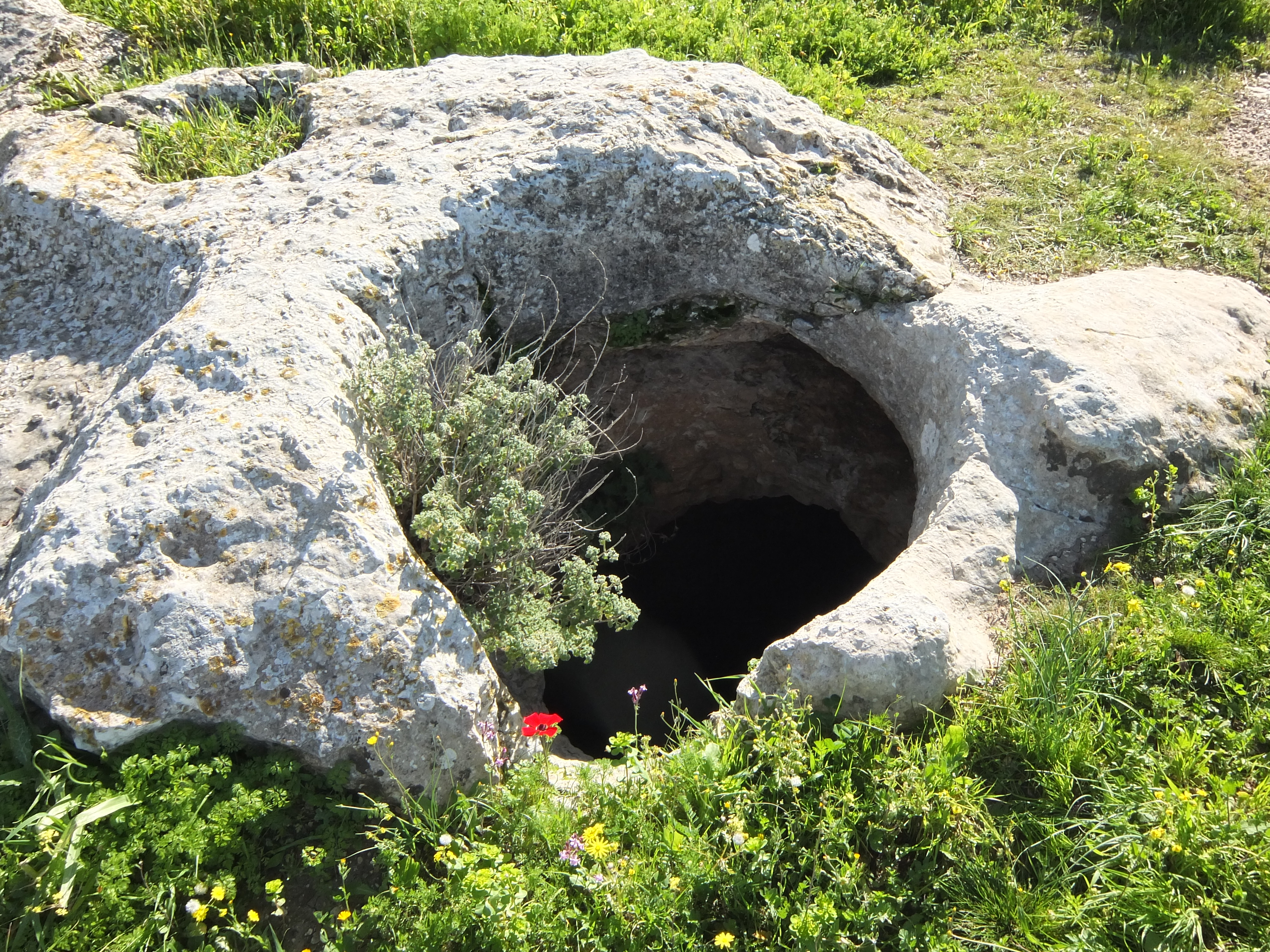
Ancient cistern at Tel Socho

The hill of Tel Sokho is now known as Givat HaTurmusim, or "Hill of the Lupines". In late March, the entire hill is covered with wild blue mountain lupines (Lupinus pilosus) and becomes a popular outing destination for Israeli families. The hill is surrounded by precipitous slopes on its north side, making it almost impassable. Trails ascend the mountain on its northwestern and southeastern sides. The Elah Valley runs in a westerly-easterly direction on its north side, the hilltop affording a good view of the valley below.

On the elevated plateau, one can see the foundations of ancient dwellings carved into the bedrock with individual chambers divided by broken stone protuberances. Caves and grottoes dot the landscape, and cisterns are carved deep into the rock. Oak trees, fig trees, and terebinths grow on the mountainside and piles of large ashlar boulders, covered with lichen, attest to the presence of a defensive wall around the city in antiquity. According to the biblical narrative, when Joshua captured the city from the Canaanites, the city and environs became the inheritance of Judah.

== Archaeology ==
A survey of the site in the Elah Valley was conducted in 2010 by Yosef Garfinkel on behalf of the Hebrew University's Institute of Archaeology and by Michael Gerald Hasel on behalf of Southern Adventist University. Excavations at the foot of the northern slope exposed a Byzantine building from the 5th to 6th centuries. Remains dating to Iron Age II were uncovered in another dig at the foot of the northern slope, and walls dating to the Middle Bronze Age were discovered in probe trenches. Potsherds dating to the Late Bronze Age and later periods were gathered, along with a terracotta figurine of reddish-brown clay depicting a naked woman.

The discovery of a pre-exilic stamp with the imprint La-melekh (למלך), and in which Sokho is named with another three cities, has led archaeologists to conclude that Sokho may have served as an administrative or storage center. One of the wells to the west in the valley, mentioned by Claude Conder, was destroyed with explosives by Arab infiltrators (mistanenim) in 1956, never being rebuilt. An intensive survey conducted in 2010 included an examination of Middle Bronze and Iron Age burial caves, as well as slag from a pottery workshop (which probably dates to the Crusader/Mamluk period).

== See also ==
- Levantine archaeology
