= Khirbat Khudash =

Archaeological site in the West Bank

- Shown in the West Bank
- 32°2′28.963″N 35°2′58.012″E
- Periods: Iron Age I, Iron Age IIB, Roman–Byzantine, Ottoman
- Location: Beit Aryeh-Ofarim
- Region: Southwestern Samaria, West Bank

Site notes
- Excavation dates: 1991–1994
- Condition: Mostly intact, some of it covered by Beit Aryeh-Ofarim's built-up area

Khirbat Khudash is an archaeological site in the West Bank, located within the Israeli settlement of Beit Aryeh-Ofarim, next to the Palestinian village of Al-Lubban al-Gharbi. It comprises small, planned and fortified site dating to the Iron Age IIB, notable for its numerous oil presses. The site is located today within. It was first identified during a survey of the southwestern Samaria Highlands carried out by David Eitam in the 1970s and was excavated in the 1990s under the supervision of Shimon Riklin.

The Iron Age IIB period (late 9th–8th centuries BCE) is considered a time of prosperity in the Northern Kingdom of Israel, which came to an end with the kingdom's destruction in 720 BCE. Khirbat Khudash is located next to Khirbat Banat Barr, which was likely a regional royal Israelite and identified with a biblical town named Zereda, in the territory of the Tribe of Ephraim, mentioned in 1 Kings 11: 26-28. Three other industrial sites from the Iron Age II exist in its vicinity: Qla', Khirbat Deir Daqla and Kurnet Bir et-Tell. The rest of the sites in the region are rural in their nature. The site was likely abandoned some during the Assyrian campaigns against Israel in the 720s BCE.

This type of sites was understood by scholars such as Avraham Faust and Haya Katz as local initiatives. Its numerous oil presses suggest that production was intended for large-scale surplus rather than solely for domestic consumption. David Eitam asserts that it was a royal production center, belonging to the Northern Kingdom of Israel, used for international trade.

== Geography ==
The site lies on the northern slope of a low hill overlooking the Shiloh Valley (Wadi Ẓarida). The surrounding terrain consists of hard limestone of the Veradim and Bi‘na formations, forming long, east–west ridges separated by deep valleys along geological faults. These valleys shaped the routes of most ancient roads in the region. Near Khirbat Khudash, however, a road appears to have passed to the west of the site, crossing the Shiloh Valley rather than following a ridge, and then ascended toward the major Iron Age II settlement at Khirbat Banāt Barr. The site is surrounded by Mediterranean woodland dominated by oak (Quercus calliprinos) and terebinth (Pistacia palaestina) on terra rossa soil. The nearest water source is Bir Sarida, a well located some 750 meters to the east in the Shiloh Valley.

== Discovery ==
The site was discovered in a survey led by David Eitam and the assistance of Yotam Tepper, as part of the survey of the Biddya area in 1975–1976 and 1979–1980, where it was identified as a well-planned fortified site with numerous olive-oil production installations dated to the Iron Age II period. The site was excavated between April 1991 and the summer of 1994 by the Staff Officer for Archaeology, under the supervision of Shimon Riklin, prior to construction work in the northern parts of the Israeli settlement of Beit Aryeh-Ofarim. The excavation focused on the eastern part of the site which was well preserved, and the clearing of hewn agro-industrial installations to the south.

== Site plan and fortifications ==
The fortified site, covering an area of about 0.54 hectares, has a roughly square plan with a projecting bastion. Its layout reflects a preplanned division into two unequal sectors: a residential quarter in the east and a public sector with storehouses in the west. The residential area contained 16 buildings arranged along the northern, eastern, and southern sides of the site, eight of which were built against a casemate wall. Some of buildings included enclosed open spaces were remains of domestic activities such as Tabun ovens, stone slabs and grindstones for food preparation and loom weights used in textile production, as well as storage installations. The Four-room house type is also prevalent at the residential quarter.

The western part of the site contained two large structures (c. 14.0 × 13.5 m and 14.0 × 11.5 m), connected by a narrow corridor, and possibly a third smaller structure. These were understood as public buildings. One of these structures was divided internally by a row of large stone pillars. Examples of these architectural plans are common in Israelite sites such a s Tel Megiddo and Tel Hazor, where they were identified as storehouses, barracks and stables. Another smaller, diagonally aligned structure further north, visible only in aerial photographs, may also have functioned as a storehouse. The walls of these structures, 1.0–1.5 m thick, were built of double stone rows.

The site was surrounded by fortifications consisting mainly of casemate walls, supplemented by single-row walls. The eastern line is fully preserved, while substantial stretches of the northern and southern lines also survive. On the northern side, which faced the slope, the wall was reinforced with a massive buttress for additional stability. Along the western side only parts of the single-row wall remain. At the southeastern corner stood a large bastion built of hewn stone, rising to a preserved height of about 2 m. This structure, which overlooked the surrounding landscape, incorporated a small tower in its northeastern corner and appears to have been internally divided. This type of construction has been equated with other Israelite royal cities such as Tel Megiddo (Stratum IVA), which is used by David Eitam to support his hypothesis that this site is a royal oil-production center.

=== Artifacts ===
The earliest pottery fragments from the site date to the Iron Age I period (c. 12th–11th centuries BCE), indicating an initial phase of occupation. Most of the material, however, belongs to the Iron Age IIB period (late 9th–8th centuries BCE). A vessel type typical of the Northern Israelite Kingdom is the ridged-neck ‘hippo’ storage jar, which was found at a large quantity. Other vessels include kraters and cooking pots, as well sherds of a stone vessel used for perfumes. Some of pottery sherds indicate some trade relations with the Kingdom of Judah, as typical of sites in southern Samaria. A handful of potsherds from the Roman–Byzantine periods and the Ottoman Palestine were discovered, attesting to later agricultural activities at the site.

== Olive-oil production ==
The site features 33 rock-cut oil press installations. They were catalogued based on nine types all with features typical of Iron Age II rock-cut installations. Most of the installations were constructed on the southern side of the site, which is characterized by rocky terrain unsuited for agricultural activity. Two other installations were constructed within the residential quarter, highlighting they were privately owned rather than public. Olives were likely stored in small hewn caves or in round basins near the oil presses before processing. They were crushed either in a concave basin with an elliptical stone or in a square basin with a roller. The resulting mash was placed on a pressing bed beneath a beam, anchored on one side and weighted on the other, which extracted the oil using a lever-and-weight system. Stone weights found at the site, including doughnut-shaped and bell-shaped examples, indicate the types of equipment used. The liquid flowed into a collecting vat through a hole or slot, where the residue settled in a cup at the bottom. The oil then overflowed into a side vat, or, if absent, into a basin where it was collected manually.

The oil presses uncovered at Khirbat Khudash are estimated to have had an annual capacity of 6,993–11,340 liters, based on the enlarged volume of their collecting vats and an assumed three pressing operations per day. With 16 three- and four-room houses identified at the site, the population has been estimated at 120 inhabitants, whose annual consumption would have been around 400 liters. The surplus production was likely intended for trade.

== See also ==
- Qla'

== Bibliography ==
- Eitam, D. (2025). "Khirbat Khudash (Bet Arye): A Royal Olive Oil Production Center in the Kingdom of Israel". 'Atiqot. 118: 74–98. doi:10.70967/2948-040X.2317.
- Kochavi, M. (1989). "The Identification of Zeredah, Home of Jeroboam Son of Nebat, King of Israel". Eretz-Israel: Archaeological, Historical and Geographical Studies (in Hebrew). 20: 198–201. JSTOR 23621891.
- Riklin, S. (1997). "אתר מתקופת הברזל הב' בבית אריה" [Iron Age II Site in Bet Aryé]. 'Atiqot (in Hebrew). 32: 7–20. JSTOR 23458274.
