= Eglon (biblical place) =

Eglon (Hebrew: עֶגְלוֹן) was a Canaanite city-state mentioned in the Hebrew Bible, with no direct reference in other historical non-Biblical sources available from that time (like the Amarna letters). According to the Book of Joshua, Debir, king of Eglon, joined a confederation against Gibeon when that city made peace with Israel. The five kings involved were slain and Eglon was later conquered and its inhabitants condemned to destruction. It was thereafter included in the territory of the Tribe of Judah, although it is not mentioned outside of the Book of Joshua.

According to archaeologist Avraham Faust, most scholars identify the location of Eglon with the site of Tel 'Eton.

== Tel 'Eton ==
Tel 'Eton
- Location within Israel
- 31.4897°N 34.9284°E
- Periods: a city during the Early Bronze, Middle Bronze, Late Bronze, and Iron Ages; smaller settlement during the Persian and Hellenistic periods
- Cultures: Canaanite; Israelite (Judahite)
- Location: Southern District, Israel
- Region: Southern Levant

History
- Abandoned: Assyrian destruction, late 8th century BCE

Site notes
- Archaeologists: Avraham Faust (2006-2026 and ongoing)

Tel 'Eton (Hebrew: תל עיטון; sometimes spelled Tel Eton), also known as 'Aaton, is an archaeological site 6 miles southeast of Lachish and 23 miles southeast of Ashkelon excavated since 2006 and ongoing as of 2026, by Avraham Faust of Bar Ilan University. It is the probable site of ancient Eglon, but no direct reference of the name have been found. The site of Tel Eton was transformed in the 10th century BCE, and some of the structures built in this site involved ashlar in construction. Prior to these findings, the lack of ashlar construction in this period in the region of Judah was an "oftquoted evidence against the historical plausibility of a kingdom centered in Judah". The archaeologist William G. Dever estimates its population at around 1,200 during the 9th and 8th centuries BCE.

In the late 8th century BCE, the city, including the governor's residence, appears to have been destroyed by the Assyrian army.

Abandoned for almost four centuries, the tell (archaeological mound) was resettled in about the fourth century BCE, when a village and a fortified structure were erected at its top. The new settlement was again abandoned within a century, this time for good.
