= Qla' =

Archaeological site in West Bank

- Kala', Klia
- Location within the West Bank
- 32°03′20″N 35°05′14″E
- Type: agro-industrial complex
- Periods: Iron Age
- Cultures: Israelite (northern)
- Region: Samarian highlands
- Part of: Kingdom of Israel
- Palestine grid: 158/162

History
- Built: Iron Age I (hamlet); 8th-century BCE (production center)
- Abandoned: c. 720 BCE

Site notes
- Height: 433 m (1,421 ft)
- Excavation dates: 1980
- Archaeologists: David Eitam
- Condition: in ruins

Qla' or Klia is a fortified Iron Age II archaeological site located in the southwestern Samarian highlands of the modern-day West Bank. Excavated in the 1980s as part of salvage operations by David Eitam, the site proved to be an agro-industrial complex specializing in the production of olive oil and wine. It is interpreted as a royal agricultural estate operated under the auspices of the Kingdom of Israel during the 8th century BCE.

== Location ==
Qla' is situated atop an elongated rocky hill 433 meters above sea level, on the southern bank of Nahal Shilo (also known as Wadi Amuriya). It is located approximately 30 km east of Tel Aviv Yafo and near the village of Deir Ghassana. The local terrain includes limestone outcrops, steep slopes and cliffs. The region is traversed by west-east paths along wadis and small springs such as 'Ain el-Fawara are present nearby. The site's natural topography was ideal for defense and resource management.

== Site description ==
The earliest evidence at Qla' dates to Iron I, when it functioned as a hamlet. During the Iron IIB (8th century BCE), it was rebuilt and fortified as an agro-industrial production center. There are also minor remains from the Hellenistic period. The site encompasses an area of about 0.5 hectares of built-up space and up to 4 hectares including adjacent agricultural zones.

The settlement consists of:

=== Fortifications ===
- Fortified enclosure: a perimeter wall (1.1 meters wide) built with large hammer-dressed stones in the lower courses, supplemented by steep cliffs on the west for natural defense.
- Gateways and bastions: two possible entry points in the east and southwest, with structures resembling gatehouses, courtyards, and bastion-like features.

=== Structures ===
Excavated structures include:

- Building 15 (Area A): a tower-like structure possibly used as an official residence, including a subterranean food storage unit.
- Building 102 (Area B): a multi-room complex, partly built into a rock slope, with evidence of domestic and storage usage, including Iron IIB ceramic assemblages and a lion figurine possibly used as a weight.

=== Industrial installations ===
Qla' was a major industrial hub, with over 30 rock-cut installations used for olive oil and wine production. Twenty-two lever and weight oil presses were discovered, mostly with adjacent crushing basins. These represent a significant advancement in Iron Age agro-technology. Estimated annual production reached approximately 5,280 liters, far exceeding subsistence needs. Two large complex wine presses were found. Features include treading floors, settling vats, and deep collecting vats capable of containing several thousand liters. Estimated wine production could reach up to 30,800 liters annually.

Storage was conducted in bell-shaped pits, reused rooms such as Room L102, and possibly gateway chambers. Large quantities of hippo jars (standardized storage containers) were uncovered, suggesting large-scale redistribution efforts.

=== Agricultural context ===
The site was supported by terraced fields on its southern slopes. Estimated olive cultivation area required to support the presses was about 12 hectares. Some terraces were likely established in the early first millennium BCE. Water storage was augmented by large rock-cut reservoirs and cisterns.

== Artifacts ==
The ceramic assemblage is characteristic of Iron IIB northern Israel, featuring cooking pots, kraters, and storage jars. Notable small finds include:

- A basalt lion figurine has been interpreted either as a weight conforming to the Judahite sheqel standard or, alternatively, as an amulet. The latter view, proposed by Irit Ziffer, is based on an analysis of the object's iconography, stylistic parallels, and functional context. According to her interpretation, the crouching pose and stylized mane associate the figurine with apotropaic traditions found in Egyptian faience amulets, Assyrian weights, and various zoomorphic seals and ivory figures from the Bronze and Iron Ages across the Levant and ancient Mesopotamia. She further notes that the absence of inscriptions and the presence of grooves, possibly for suspension, support its identification as a protective charm.
- Ground-stone tools (grinding slabs and pestles)
- Cosmetic vessels and bone stoppers
- Iron implements, including a horseshoe-shaped object and a rod

== Function and ownership ==
Qla' is interpreted as a royal production center established by the central government in Samaria during the region of Jeroboam II (786–746 BCE). Along with similar sites like Hudash and Kurnat Bir et-Tell, it represents an 8th-century initiative to industrialize and expand Israel's economic base through surplus production and distribution of oil and wine. The organization of installations, investment in infrastructure, and sheer production capacity argue against local, family-based operation. Instead, Qla' displays a centrally-planned shift from subsistence to a proto-market economy in the Israelite highlands.

The site is an example for the economic sophistication of the northern Kingdom of Israel prior to its fall to the Assyrians c. 720 BCE. The site reflects both technological advancements but also broader socio-political trends such as state-sponsored agriculture, distribution networks, and the gradual emergence of market-oriented practices.

== See also ==
- Ancient Israelite cuisine
- Gibeon
- Khirbet Khudash

== Sources ==
- Eitam, David; Lederman, Zvi; Kleiman, Assaf (2024-01-02). "Qlaʿ: A Royal Oil- and Wine-Production Centre in the Kingdom of Israel". Tel Aviv. 51 (1): 18–49. doi:10.1080/03344355.2024.2327798. ISSN 0334-4355.
- Finkelstein, Israel; Lederman, Zvi; Bunimovitz, Shlomo (1997). Highlands of Many Cultures: The Southern Samaria Survey. Vol. 1. Institute of Archaeology of Tel-Aviv University.
- Greenberg, Raphael; Keinan, Adi (2009). Israeli Archaeological Activity in the West Bank 1967–2007: A Sourcebook (PDF). Ostracon. ISBN 978-965-91468-0-2.
- Ziffer, Irit (2024-01-02). "The Lion Figurine from Qlaʿ". Tel Aviv. 51: 50–58. doi:10.1080/03344355.2024.2327799. ISSN 0334-4355.
