= Avraham Faust =

Israeli archaeologist

Avraham Faust (Hebrew: אברהם פאווסט) is an Israeli archaeologist and professor at Bar-Ilan University. He directs excavations at Tel Eton, widely regarded as the probable site of biblical Eglon.

== Early life and education ==
Faust was born and raised in Israel. He completed his undergraduate and graduate studies at Bar-Ilan University, where he later earned his doctorate. His academic work centered on the archaeology of ancient Israel, and he has been deeply involved in the study of the relationship between archaeological findings and the biblical narrative.

== Career ==
Avraham Faust is a professor at Bar-Ilan University, where he teaches in the Department of Bible, Archaeology, and Ancient Near Eastern Studies. His primary research interests include the archaeology of ancient Israel, focusing on the Iron Age, the development of Israelite society, and the social and political organization of early Israel.

Faust has conducted extensive excavations at several significant sites in Israel. His work has focused on understanding the material culture of the Israelites, their settlements, and their interactions with neighboring cultures. He has particularly contributed to studies concerning the emergence of Israelite identity and its relationship with surrounding Canaanite and other ancient civilizations.

Faust's scholarly work is known for its critical examination of the connection between biblical texts and archaeological evidence. He has contributed to the understanding of how archaeology can inform our knowledge of biblical history and vice versa. His publications include both monographs and articles that discuss the social, political, and economic aspects of ancient Israel.

== Selected publications ==
- The Israelite Society in the Period of the Monarchy: an Archaeological Perspective (2005) (in Hebrew)
- Israel’s Ethnogenesis: Settlement, Interaction, Expansion and Resistance (2006) (Irene Levi-Sala Prize in the Archaeology of Israel 2008; G. Ernest Wright Book Award of the American School of Oriental Research; Biblical Archaeology Society Publication Award (2009)
- The Archaeology of Israelite Society in Iron Age II (2012)
- Judah in the Neo-Babylonian Period: The Archaeology of Desolation (2012)
- with Safrai, Z. The Settlement History of Ancient Israel: A Quantitative Analysis (2015)
- The Neo-Assyrian Empire in the Southwest: Imperial Domination and its Consequences (2021)
- with Farber, Z. The Bible's First Kings: Uncovering the Story of Saul, David, and Solomon (2025)
