= Paleo-Hebrew alphabet =

Writing found in Canaanite inscriptions

- Script type: Abjad
- Creator: Hebrews
- Period: c. 1000 BCE – 135 CE
- Direction: Right-to-left script
- Language: Biblical Hebrew

Related scripts
- Parent systems: Egyptian hieroglyphs: Proto-Sinaitic script; Phoenician alphabet; Paleo-Hebrew alphabet
- Child systems: Samaritan script
- Sister systems: Aramaic alphabet; Greek alphabet

ISO 15924
- ISO 15924: Phnx (115), Phoenician

Unicode
- Unicode alias: Phoenician
- Unicode range: U+10900–U+1091F

The Paleo-Hebrew script (Hebrew: הכתב העברי הקדום), (𐤄𐤊𐤕𐤁 𐤄𐤏𐤁𐤓𐤉), also Palaeo-Hebrew, Proto-Hebrew or Old Hebrew, is the writing system found in Canaanite and Aramaic inscriptions, including pre-Biblical and Biblical Hebrew, from southern Canaan, also known as the biblical kingdoms of Israel (Samaria) and Judah. It is considered to be the script used to record the original texts of the Bible. Due to its similarity to the Samaritan script, the Talmud states that the Samaritans still used this script. The Talmud also described it as the "Libonaʾa script" (Jewish Babylonian Aramaic: לִיבּוֹנָאָה, romanized: Lībōnāʾā), translated by some as "Lebanon script". It has also been suggested that the name is a corrupted form (with the letters nun and lamed accidentally swapped) of "Neapolitan", i.e. of Nablus. Use of the term "Paleo-Hebrew alphabet" for the script follows the suggestion by Solomon Birnbaum, who in 1954 argued that "[t]o apply the term Phoenician [from Northern Canaan, today's Lebanon] to the script of the Hebrews [from Southern Canaan, today's Israel-Palestine] is hardly suitable". The Paleo-Hebrew and Phoenician alphabets are two slight regional variants of the same script.

The first Paleo-Hebrew inscription identified in modern times was the Royal Steward inscription (KAI 191), found in 1870, and described at the time as "two large ancient Hebrew inscriptions in Phoenician letters". Fewer than 2,000 inscriptions are known today, of which the vast majority comprise just a single letter or word. The earliest known examples of Paleo-Hebrew writing date to the 10th century BCE.

Like the Phoenician alphabet, it is a slight regional variant and an immediate continuation of the Proto-Canaanite alphabet, a regional form of the Proto-Sinaitic script which was used throughout Canaan in the Late Bronze Age. Phoenician, Hebrew, and all of their sister Canaanite languages were largely indistinguishable dialects before that time. The Paleo-Hebrew script is an abjad of 22 consonantal letters, exactly as the other Canaanite scripts from the period.

By the 5th century BCE, among Judeans the alphabet had been mostly replaced by the Aramaic alphabet as used officially by the Achaemenid Empire. The "square" variant now known simply as the Hebrew alphabet evolved directly out of this by about the 3rd century BCE, although some letter shapes did not become standard until the 1st century CE. By contrast, the Samaritan script is an immediate continuation of the Proto-Hebrew script without intermediate non-Israelite evolutionary stages. There is also some continued use of the Paleo-Hebrew script in Jewish religious contexts down to the 1st century BCE, notably in the Paleo-Hebrew Leviticus Scroll found in the Dead Sea Scrolls.

== History ==
=== Origins ===
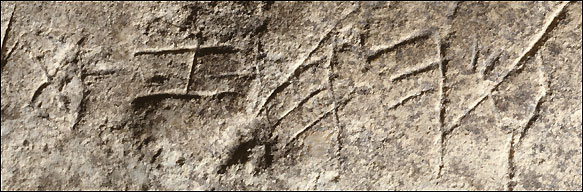
Photograph of section of the Zayit Stone, 10th century BCE: (right-to-left) the letters waw, he, het, zayin, tet (𐤅𐤄𐤇𐤆𐤈)

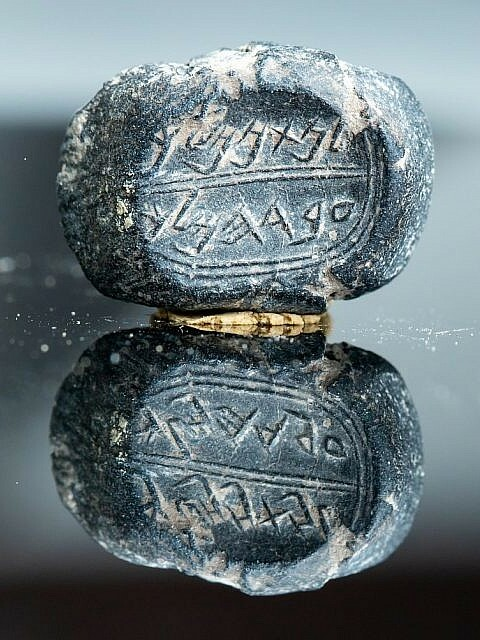
Paleo-Hebrew signet ring discovered in Jerusalem's City of David. City of David Archive, Eliyahu Yannai.

The Paleo-Hebrew and Phoenician alphabets developed in the wake of the Bronze Age collapse, out of their immediate predecessor script Proto-Canaanite (Late Proto-Sinaitic) during the 13th to 12th centuries BCE, and earlier Proto-Sinaitic scripts.

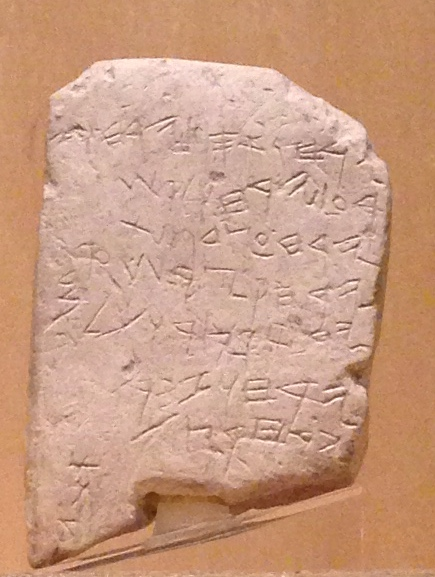
Gezer calendar

The earliest known inscription in the Paleo-Hebrew script is the Zayit Stone discovered on a wall at Tel Zayit, in the Beth Guvrin Valley in the lowlands of ancient Judea in 2005, about 50 km (31 mi) southwest of Jerusalem. The 22 letters were carved on one side of the 38 lb (17 kg) stone, which resembles a bowl on the other. The find is attributed to the mid-10th century BCE. The so-called Ophel inscription is of a similar age, but difficult to interpret. The Gezer calendar is commonly dated to the 10th century BCE.

The script on the Zayit Stone and Gezer Calendar are an earlier form than the classical Paleo-Hebrew of the 8th century and later; this early script is almost identical to the early Phoenician script on the 9th-century Ahiram sarcophagus inscription. By the 8th century, a number of regional characteristics begin to separate the script into a number of national alphabets, including the Israelite (Israel and Judah), Moabite (Moab and Ammon), Edomite, Phoenician and Old Aramaic scripts.

Linguistic features of the Moabite language (rather than generic Northwest Semitic) are visible in the Mesha Stele inscription, commissioned around 840 BCE by King Mesha of Moab. Similarly, the Tel Dan Stele, dated approximately 810 BCE, is written in Old Aramaic, dating from a period when Dan had already fallen into the orbit of Damascus.

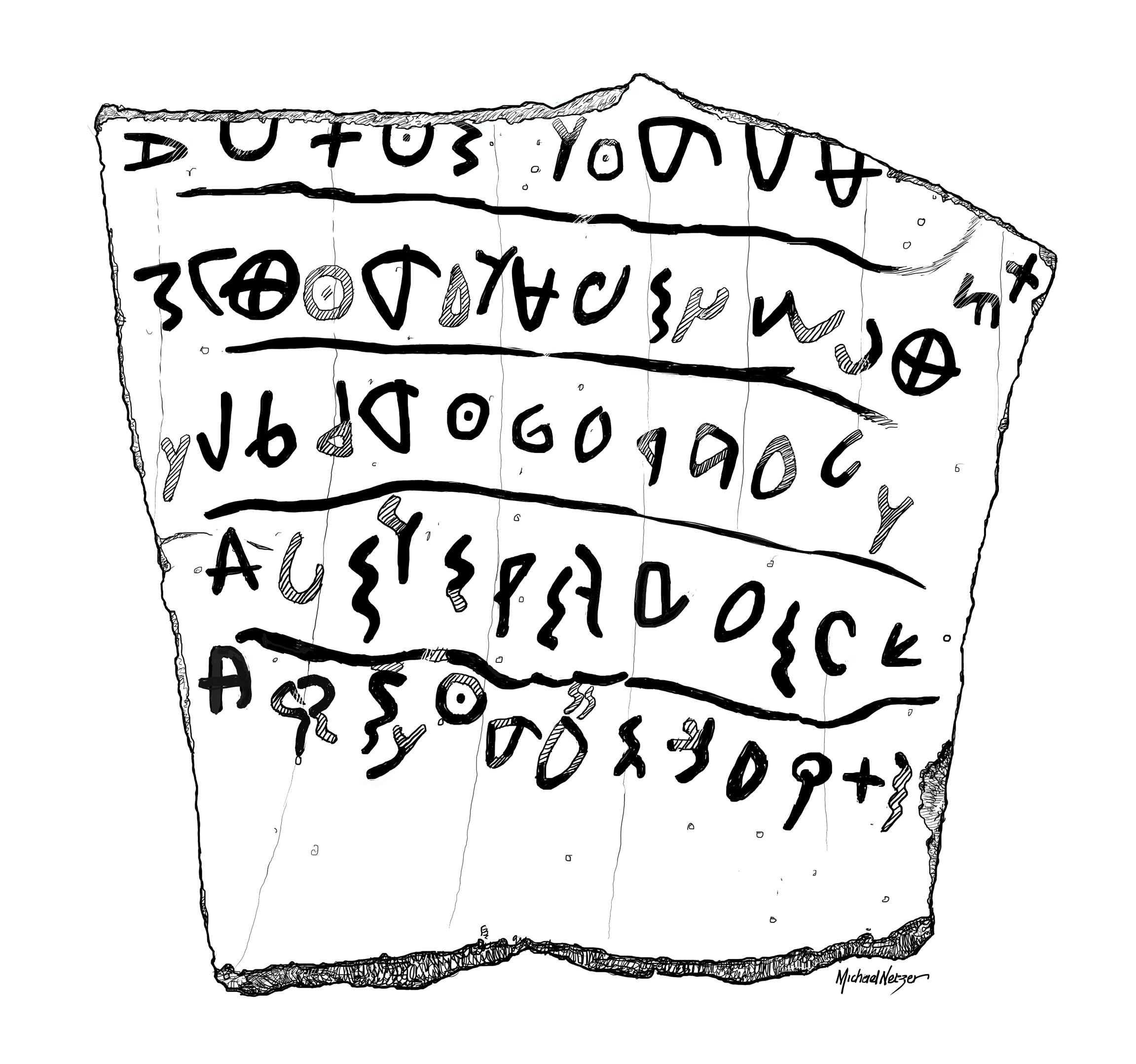
Drawing of the Khirbet Qeiyafa ostracon

The oldest inscriptions identifiable as Biblical Hebrew have long been limited to the 8th century BCE. In 2008, however, a potsherd (ostracon) bearing an inscription was excavated at Khirbet Qeiyafa which has since been interpreted as representing a recognizably Hebrew inscription dated to as early as the 10th century BCE. The argument identifying the text as Hebrew relies on the use of vocabulary.

From the 8th century onward, Hebrew epigraphy becomes more common, showing the gradual spread of literacy among the people of the Kingdom of Israel and the Kingdom of Judah; the oldest portions of the Hebrew Bible, although transmitted via the recension of the Second Temple period, are also dated to the 8th century BCE.

=== Use in the Israelite kingdoms ===
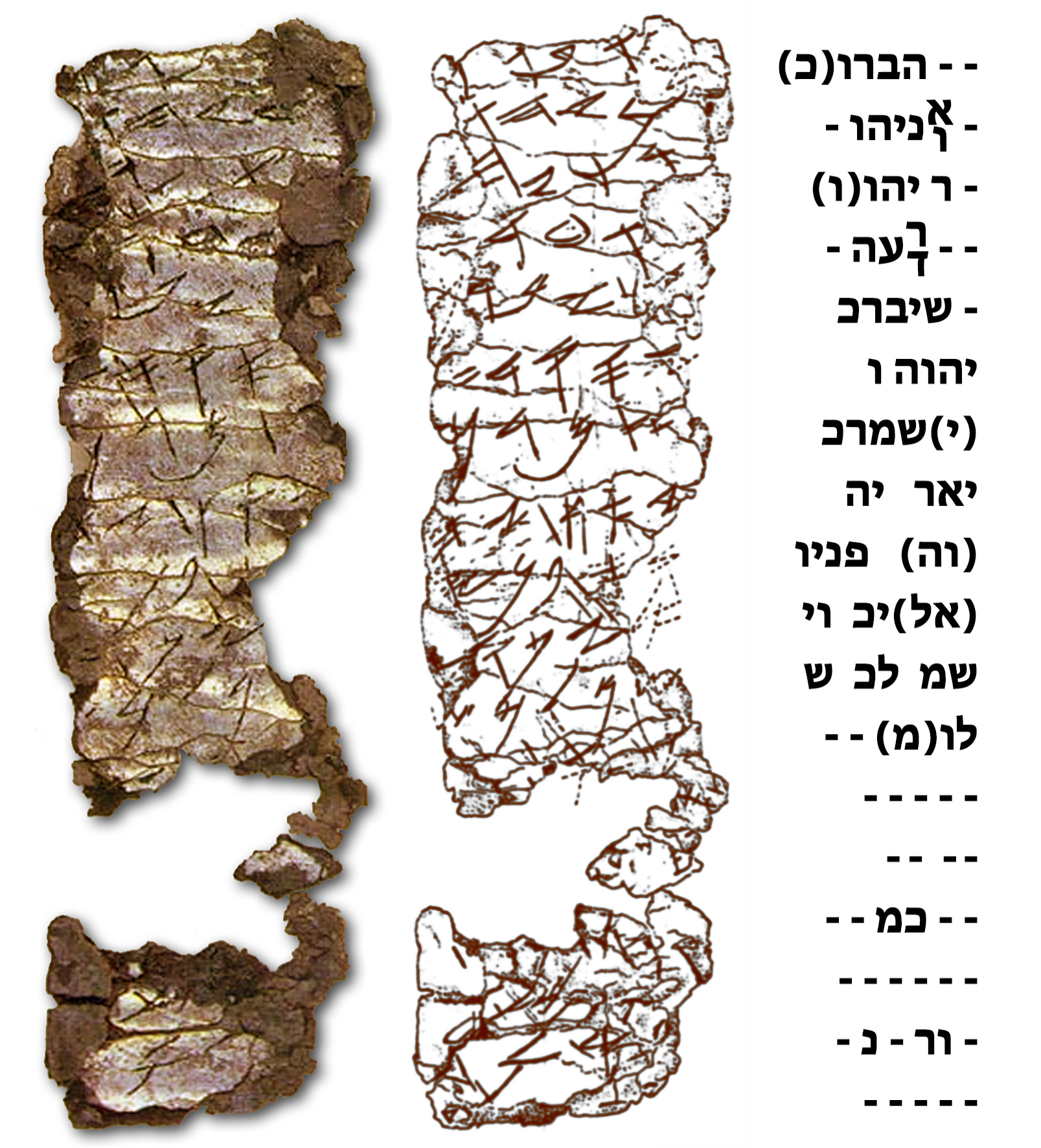
Illustration of script on one of the Ketef Hinnom scrolls, c. 700 BCE—the "Silver Scroll"

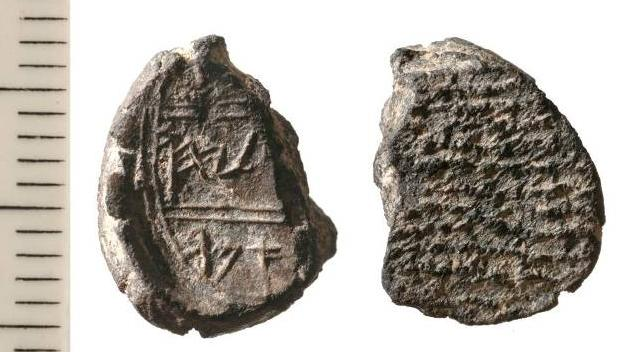
The Immer Bulla (7th–6th century BCE), written in the Paleo-Hebrew script, was discovered during the Temple Mount Sifting Project.

The Paleo-Hebrew alphabet was in common use in the kingdoms of Israel and Judah throughout the 8th and 7th centuries BCE. During the 6th century BCE, the time of the Babylonian exile, the Paleo-Hebrew alphabet was gradually replaced by the use of the Imperial Aramaic alphabet. The letters of Imperial Aramaic were again given shapes characteristic for writing Hebrew during the Second Temple period, developing into the "square shape" of the Hebrew alphabet.

The Samaritans, who remained in the Land of Israel, continued to use their variant of the Paleo-Hebrew alphabet, called the Samaritan script. After the fall of the Persian Empire, Jews used both scripts before settling on the Assyrian form.

The Paleo-Hebrew script evolved by developing numerous cursive features, the lapidary features of the Phoenician alphabet being ever less pronounced with the passage of time. The aversion of the lapidary script may indicate that the custom of erecting stelae by the kings and offering votive inscriptions to the deity was not widespread in Israel. Even the engraved inscriptions from the 8th century exhibit elements of the cursive style, such as the shading, which is a natural feature of pen-and-ink writing. Examples of such inscriptions include the Siloam inscription, numerous tomb inscriptions from Jerusalem, the Ketef Hinnom scrolls, a fragmentary Hebrew inscription on an ivory which was taken as war spoils (probably from Samaria) to Nimrud, the Arad ostraca dating to the 6th-century BCE, the hundreds of 8th to 6th-century Hebrew seals from various sites, and the Paleo-Hebrew Leviticus scroll discovered near Tel Qumran. The most developed cursive script is found on the 18 Lachish ostraca, letters sent by an officer to the governor of Lachish just before the destruction of the First Temple in 586 BCE. A slightly earlier (circa 620 BCE) but similar script is found on an ostracon excavated at Mesad Hashavyahu, containing a petition for redress of grievances (an appeal by a field worker to the fortress's governor regarding the confiscation of his cloak, which the writer considers to have been unjust).

=== Decline and late survival ===
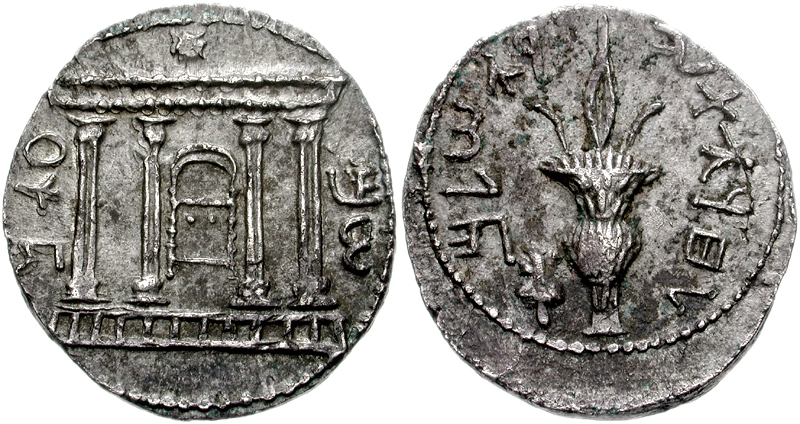
Coin from the Bar Kokhba revolt with the Paleo-Hebrew writings. The letters are 𐤇𐤓𐤅𐤕 𐤋𐤉𐤓𐤅𐤔𐤋𐤌 on one side and 𐤔𐤌𐤏𐤍 on the other, meaning 'of (or: for) the freedom of Jerusalem' and the name 'Shimon' (לחרות ירושל[י]ם and שמע[ו]ן in square script).

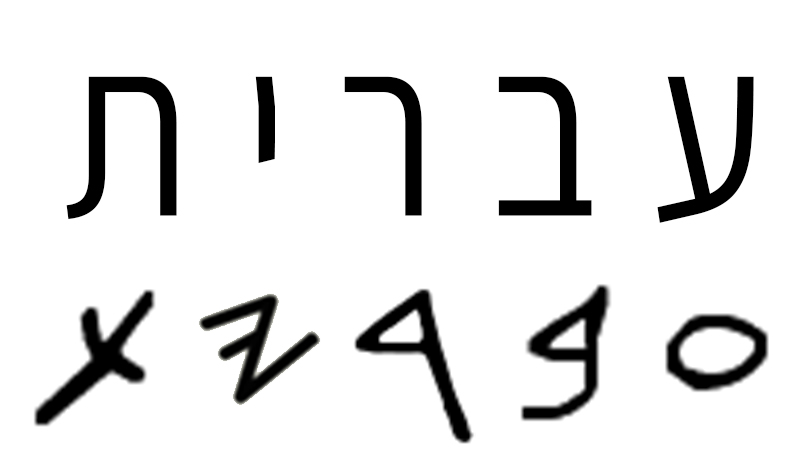
The word "Hebrew" (עברית ʿbryt, modern Hebrew: Ivrit) written in the modern Hebrew alphabet (top), and in the Paleo-Hebrew alphabet (bottom)

After the Babylonian capture of Judea, when most of the nobles were taken into exile, the Paleo-Hebrew alphabet continued to be used by the people who remained. One example of such writings are the 6th-century BCE jar handles from Gibeon, on which the names of winegrowers are inscribed. Beginning from the 5th century BCE onward, the Aramaic language and script became an official means of communication. Paleo-Hebrew was still used by scribes and others.

The Paleo-Hebrew script was retained for some time as an archaizing or conservative mode of writing. It is found in certain texts of the Torah among the Dead Sea Scrolls, dated to the 2nd to 1st centuries BCE: manuscripts 4Q12, 6Q1: Genesis. 4Q22: Exodus. 1Q3, 2Q5, 4Q11, 4Q45, 4Q46, 6Q2, and the Leviticus scroll (11QpaleoLev). In some Qumran documents, the tetragrammaton name of the Israelite deity, YHWH, is written in Paleo-Hebrew while the rest of the text is rendered in the adopted Aramaic square script that became today's normative Jewish Hebrew script. The vast majority of the Hasmonean coinage, as well as the coins of the First Jewish–Roman War and Bar Kokhba's revolt, bears Paleo-Hebrew legends. The Paleo-Hebrew alphabet fell completely out of use among Jews only after 135 CE.

== Legacy ==
=== Samaritan alphabet ===
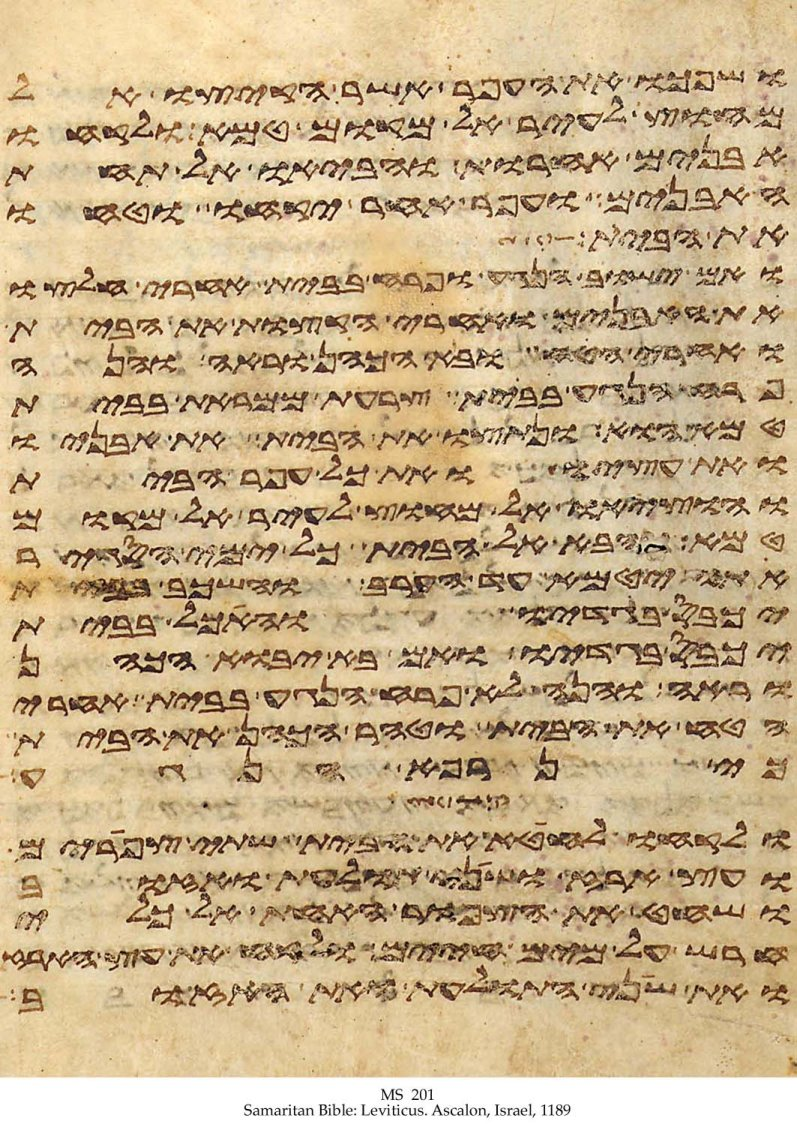
A page from the Samaritan version of Leviticus

The paleo-Hebrew alphabet continued to be used by the Samaritans and over time developed into the Samaritan alphabet. The Samaritans have continued to use the script for writing both Hebrew and Aramaic texts until the present day. A comparison of the earliest Samaritan inscriptions and the medieval and modern Samaritan manuscripts clearly indicates that the Samaritan script is a static script which was used mainly as a book hand.

=== Talmud ===
The Talmudic sages did not share a uniform stance on the subject of Paleo-Hebrew. Some stated that Paleo-Hebrew was the original script used by the Israelites at the time of the Exodus, whereas the Aramaic square script was brought from Assyria and introduced for writing Torah scrolls in the post-exilic period, while others believed that Paleo-Hebrew merely served as a stopgap in a time when the ostensibly original script (the Assyrian Script) was lost. According to both opinions, Ezra the Scribe (c. 500 BCE) introduced, or reintroduced the Assyrian script to be used as the primary alphabet for the Hebrew language. The arguments given for both opinions are rooted in Jewish scripture and/or tradition.

A third opinion in the Talmud states that the script never changed altogether. Rabbi Eleazar from Modiin, the sage who expressed this opinion, based his opinion on a scriptural verse, which makes reference to the shape of the letter vav. He argues further that, given the commandment to copy a Torah scroll directly from another, the script could not conceivably have been modified at any point. A different version of the debate in the Jerusalem Talmud refers to the circular shapes of the letters Ayin in Paleo-Hebrew and Samekh in square script on the stone tablets as miracles according to the respective sages arguing for one script or the other. This third opinion was accepted by some early Jewish scholars, and rejected by others, partially because it was permitted to write the Torah in Greek.

=== Contemporary use ===
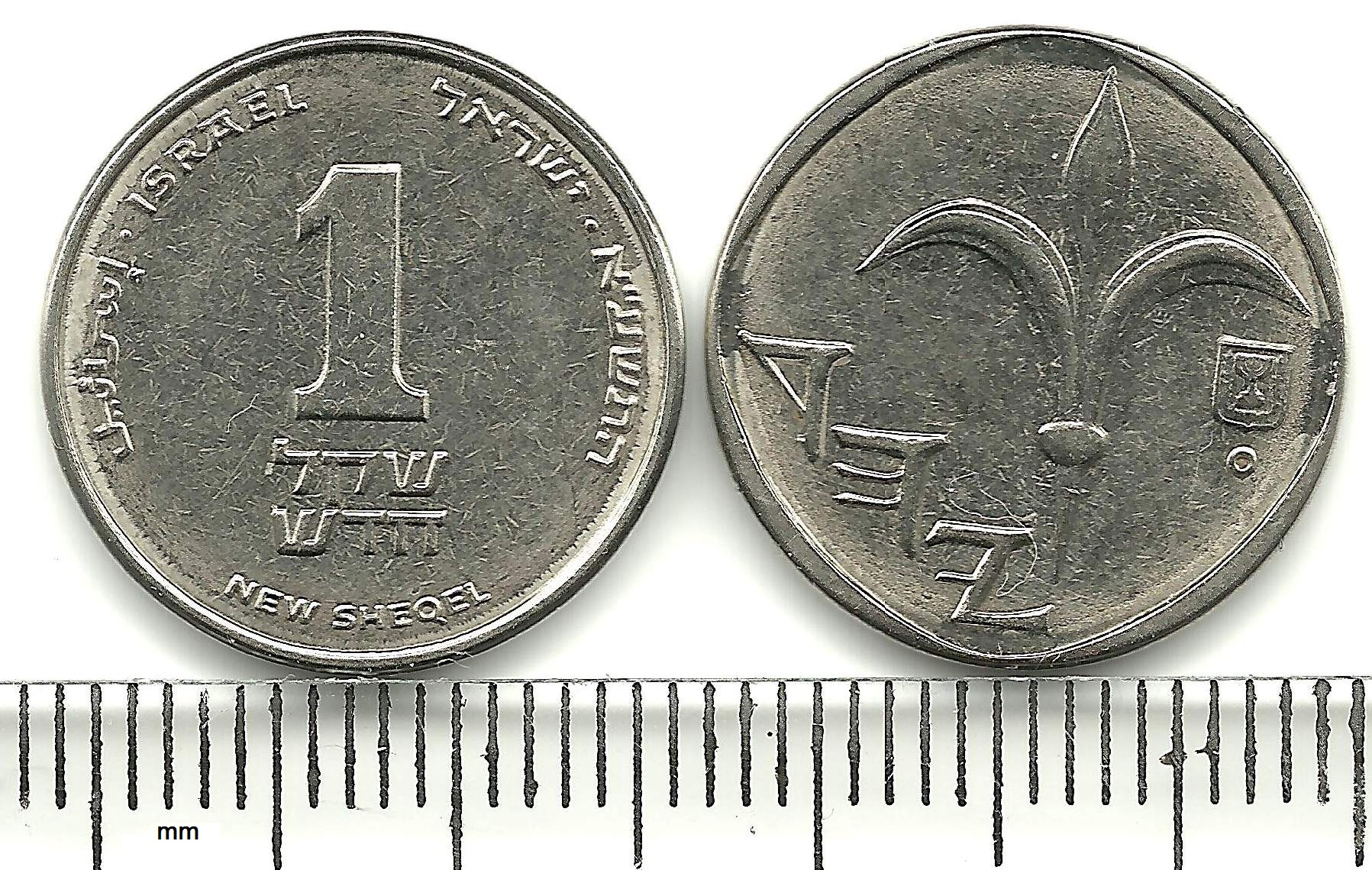
YHD (𐤉𐤄𐤃), for Yehud, written in Paleo-Hebrew on the 1 New Shekel coin (1986)

𐤁𐤓𐤅𐤊 𐤌𐤁𐤍𐤉𐤌 𐤀𐤔𐤓, written in Paleo-Hebrew on the coat of arms of Nahariya

Use of Proto-Hebrew in modern Israel is negligible, but it is found occasionally in nostalgic or pseudo-archaic examples, e.g. on the ₪1 coin (𐤉𐤄𐤃 "Judea") and in the logo of the Israeli town Nahariyah (Deuteronomy 33:24 𐤁𐤓𐤅𐤊 𐤌𐤁𐤍𐤉𐤌 𐤀𐤔𐤓 "Let Asher be blessed with children").

=== Archaeology ===
In 2019, the Israel Antiquities Authority (IAA) unearthed a 2,600-year-old seal impression, while conducting excavations at the City of David, containing Paleo-Hebrew script, and which is thought to have belonged to a certain "Nathan-Melech," an official in King Josiah's court.

== Table of letters ==
Phoenician or Paleo-Hebrew characters were never standardised and are found in numerous variant shapes. A general tendency of more cursive writing can be observed over the period of c. 800 BCE to 600 BCE. After 500 BCE, it is common to distinguish the script variants by names such as "Samaritan", "Aramaic", etc.

There is no difference in "Paleo-Hebrew" vs. "Phoenician" letter shapes. The names are applied depending on the language of the inscription, or if that cannot be determined, of the coastal (Phoenician) vs. highland (Hebrew) association (cf. the Zayit Stone abecedary).

Letter		Name	Meaning	Phoneme	Origin	Corresponding letter in	
Image	Text	Name	Meaning	Phoneme	Origin	Samaritan	Square
Aleph	𐤀	ʾālep	head of cattle (אלף)	ʾ [ʔ]	𓃾	ࠀ	א
Beth	𐤁	bēt	house (בית)	b [b]	𓉐	ࠁ	ב
Gimel	𐤂	gīmel	camel (גמל)	g [ɡ]	𓌙	ࠂ	ג
Daleth	𐤃	dālet	door (דלת)	d [d]	𓇯	ࠃ	ד
He	𐤄	hē	jubilation/window	h [h]	𓀠?	ࠄ	ה
Waw	𐤅	wāw	hook (וו)	w [w]	𓏲	ࠅ	ו
Zayin	𐤆	zayin	weapon (זין)	z [z]	𓏭	ࠆ	ז
Heth	𐤇	ḥēt(?)	courtyard/thread	ḥ [ħ]	𓉗/𓈈?	ࠇ	ח
Teth	𐤈	ṭēt	wheel (?)	ṭ [tˤ]	?	ࠈ	ט
Yodh	𐤉	yōd	arm, hand (יד)	y [j]	𓂝	ࠉ	י
Kaph	𐤊	kāp	palm of a hand (כף)	k [k]	𓂧	ࠊ	כ, ך
Lamedh	𐤋	lāmed	goad (למד)	l [l]	𓌅	ࠋ	ל
Mem	𐤌	mēm	water (מים)	m [m]	𓈖	ࠌ	מ, ם
Nun	𐤍	nūn	fish (נון)	n [n]	𓆓	ࠍ	נ, ן
Samekh	𐤎	sāmek	pillar, support (סמך)	s [s]	𓊽	ࠎ	ס
Ayin	𐤏	ʿayin	eye (עין)	ʿ [ʕ]	𓁹	ࠏ	ע
Pe	𐤐	pē	mouth (פה)	p [p]	𓂋	ࠐ	פ, ף
Sadek	𐤑	ṣādē	?	ṣ [sˤ]	?	ࠑ	צ, ץ
Qoph	𐤒	qōp	?	q [q]	?	ࠒ	ק
Res	𐤓	rēš	head (ראש)	r [r]	𓁶	ࠓ	ר
Sin	𐤔	šīn	tooth (שין)	š [ʃ]	𓌓	ࠔ	ש
Taw	𐤕	tāw	mark, sign (תו)	t [t]	𓏴	ࠕ	ת

== Unicode ==
The Unicode block Phoenician (U+10900–U+1091F) is intended for the representation of, apart from the Phoenician alphabet, text in Palaeo-Hebrew, Archaic Phoenician, Early Aramaic, Late Phoenician cursive, Phoenician papyri, Siloam Hebrew, Hebrew seals, Ammonite, Moabite, and Punic.

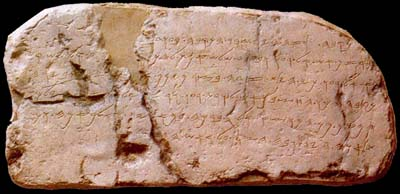
The Siloam inscription

Phoenician^{[1]}^{[2]} Official Unicode Consortium code chart (PDF)
	0	1	2	3	4	5	6	7	8	9	A	B	C	D	E	F
U+1090x	𐤀	𐤁	𐤂	𐤃	𐤄	𐤅	𐤆	𐤇	𐤈	𐤉	𐤊	𐤋	𐤌	𐤍	𐤎	𐤏
U+1091x	𐤐	𐤑	𐤒	𐤓	𐤔	𐤕	𐤖	𐤗	𐤘	𐤙	𐤚	𐤛				𐤟
Notes 1.As of Unicode version 18.0 2.Grey areas indicate non-assigned code points

== See also ==
- Ancient Hebrew writings
- Ancient North Arabian
- Biblical Hebrew orthography
- History of the Hebrew alphabet
- Proto-Canaanite alphabet
- Proto-Sinaitic script
