= Thomas Clinton =

Thomas Clinton may refer to:

- Thomas Clinton (businessman) (1918–1981), American businessman and religious leader
- Thomas Clinton (MP) (died 1415), in 1404 MP for Kent
- Thomas Clinton (MP for St Ives), in 1571 MP for St Ives
- Thomas Clinton, 3rd Earl of Lincoln (1568–1619), English peer
- Tommy Clinton (1926–2009), footballer
- Thomas Clinton, 8th Baron Clinton, Baron Clinton

== See also ==
- Thomas Pelham-Clinton, 3rd Duke of Newcastle (1752–1795), British Army officer and politician
