= The Embers (nightclub) =

Nightclub in New York City (1950s–60s)

Coordinates: 40.7588°N 73.9699°W

The Embers was a 1950s and 1960s-era New York City restaurant and nightclub formerly located at 161 East 54th Street between 3rd and Lexington Avenues. It was opened in late 1951 by former jazz musician Ralph Watkins, who had also been involved with clubs such as Bop City and Royal Roost, and featured many notable jazz acts over the years, including Marian McPartland, Dorothy Donegan, Joe Bushkin, George Shearing, Jonah Jones, Red Norvo, George Barnes and Carl Kress, and the Erroll Garner Trio. Artists who recorded there include Art Tatum, Buck Clayton, Teddy Wilson, and Dorothy Donegan.

In 1964, they made Sunday nights into a time to showcase new talent.
