= Robert H. Meneilly =

American Presbyterian pastor (1925–2021)

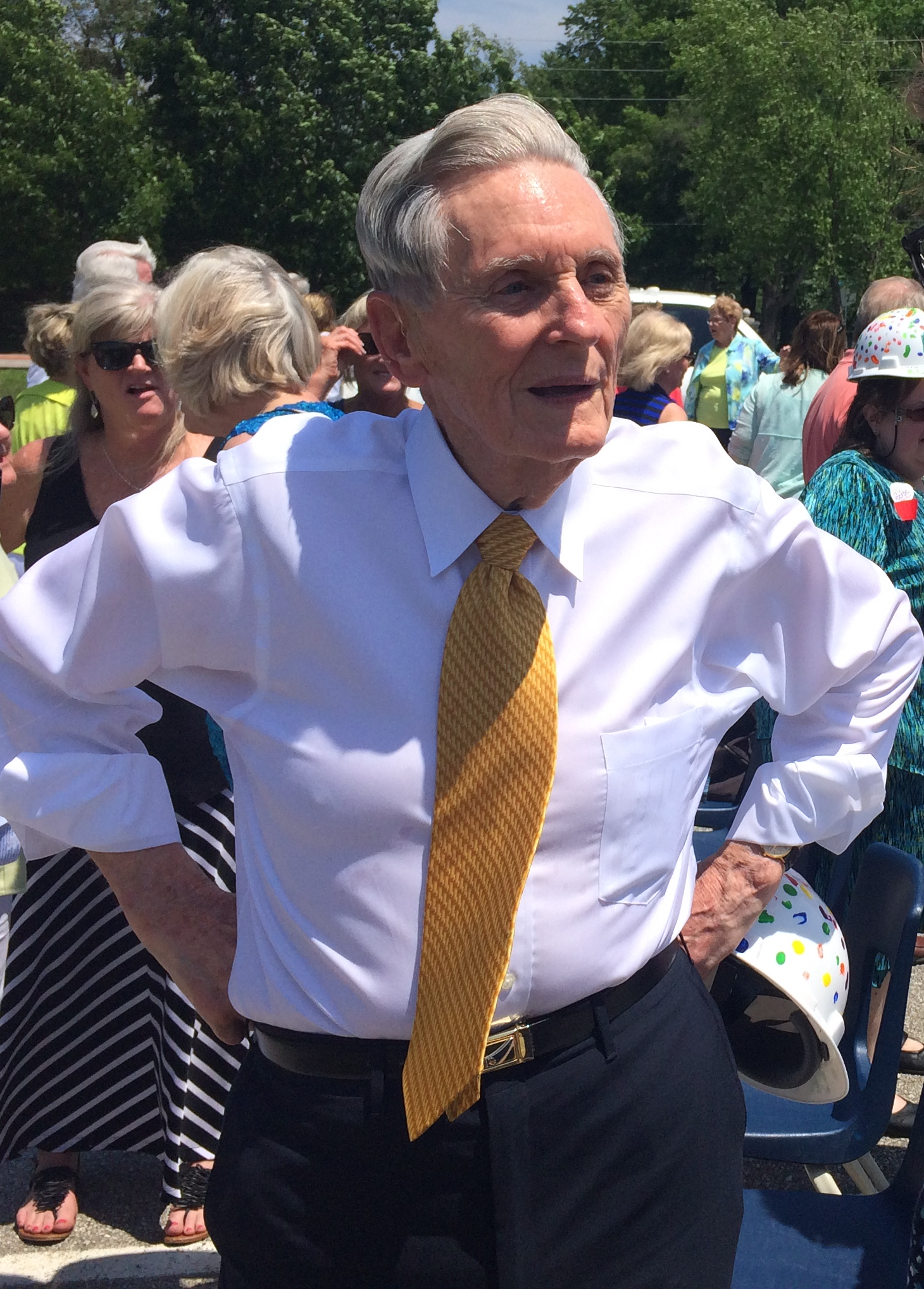
- Meneilly in 2016
- Born: March 5, 1925; Mount Lebanon, Pennsylvania
- Died: July 20, 2021 (aged 96)
- Spouse: Shirley Ann Dunlap

Ecclesiastical career
- Religion: Christianity (Presbyterian)
- Church: Presbyterian Church (USA)
- Congregations served: Village Presbyterian Church
- Offices held: Founding Senior Pastor

Academic background
- Education: Pittsburgh Theological Seminary Monmouth College

Robert H. Meneilly (March 5, 1925 – July 20, 2021), known as Dr. Bob, was an American Presbyterian pastor who founded the megachurch Village Presbyterian Church in Prairie Village, Kansas.

== Early life ==
Meneilly started preaching when he was about 13. He finished a fast-track college and seminary career, graduating from Monmouth College in 1945 at age 20 (majoring in philosophy, psychology and biology). While at Monmouth College, Meneilly become engaged to Shirley Ann Dunlap. Meneilly earned his Master of Divinity degree from Pittsburgh Theological Seminary at age 22.

Meneilly married Dunlap in 1947. They had three children. The couple had planned to go to China to do mission work, but the Communist Revolution broke out in 1946. So they considered offers for Meneilly to pastor three churches—in North Hollywood, California; in Pennsylvania; or in Prairie Village, Kansas, where they decided to move. In 1955, Meneilly received an honorary Doctor of Divinity degree from Monmouth College.

== Career ==
=== Founding Village Presbyterian Church ===
The church was founded on February 13, 1949, with 282 charter members. The Presbyterian Board of Missions, seeing the Prairie Village area as one of the fastest-growing regions in the country without a United Presbyterian denomination, invested a $100,000 to construct a parsonage and a church. The church would also be experimental in that it would be a community church for all denominations. Meneilly began going door-to-door, calling on prospective members, not knowing their religious backgrounds. As a result, Presbyterians were likely not in the majority in the initial charter of 282 members. By 1954, membership had grown to 1,600. The church grew to more than 7,700 members under Meneilly's leadership and was the PC(USA)’s second-largest congregation during his tenure.

=== Civil rights ===
Meneilly was an outspoken advocate for racial equality and fair housing. During the height of the nation's civil rights movement in the mid-1960s, Meneilly delivered several sermons encouraging members of his suburban congregation to welcome their Black neighbors. In a 2012 oral history, Meneilly reflected on the impact of his civil rights preaching. "It was very hard for some people," he recalled. "We lost one year probably 300 members." Meneilly worked for civil rights in the 1960s, women's rights in the 1970s, and LGBTQ rights in the 1980s and ’90s.

=== Vietnam War ===
In the early 1970s, Meneilly became a vocal critic of the Vietnam War. In 1972, he served as an observer to the Vietnam Paris Peace talks as part of the Citizens Conference on Ending the War, a coalition of some 50 Protestant church leaders. After that, he preached that the war was unjust and unwinnable—a position unpopular with many of those in his congregation. Over a two-year period, it caused nearly 500 members to leave the church, although a number of them later returned to the congregation. In addition, Meneilly preached that churches were criminally silent for not opposing the Vietnam War.

=== Separation of church and state ===
In 1993, Meneilly gave a sermon titled "The Dangers of Religion", which denounced what he called the stealth campaigns of the religious right, was reprinted in condensed form in The New York Times and other publications. Following that sermon, Meneilly and five other area civic leaders formed the Mainstream Coalition, which is dedicated to "creating a more representative and responsive government by empowering informed participation and meaningful action in the political process," according to the coalition's website.

In a report from Walter Cronkite which was previewed in a 1994 article in The Washington Post, the article features Meneilly as a voice against the Christian Right.

== Pittsburgh Theological Seminary ==
In addition to earning his Master of Divinity degree from Pittsburgh Theological Seminary, Meneilly also served on the Board of Directors of the Pittsburgh Theological Seminary from 1981 to 1989. He was a director emeritus of the Seminary until his death. Meneilly also served as the distinguished pastor in residence at the Seminary in 1984. In 1985, he received the Seminary's Distinguished Alumni Award. In 1997, the late John "Jack" Tillotson, a member of The Village Church, endowed the "Dr. Robert Meneilly Professor" chair for the Pittsburgh Theological Seminary in honor of Robert Meneilly. Richard Ray was installed to the chair as its first occupant, and in 2003 Craig Barnes was installed as its second occupant.

== Later life ==
On December 4, 1994, Meneilly gave his final sermon before retiring.

In retirement, Meneilly remained active in civic affairs, including serving on various boards.

Shirley Meneilly died in 2014.

Village Presbyterian Church opened a food pantry and child care center at a location the church named "The Robert and Shirley Meneilly Center for Mission".

== Awards ==
In 1972, Meneilly received the Citizen of the Year award from the United Community Services of Johnson County (Kansas).

In 1987, Meneilly received the Johnson Countian of the Year award.

In 1995, Meneilly received the Harry S. Truman Good Neighbor award.

In 2001, Meneilly received the Stand Up, Speak Out award from the Mainstream Coalition.

== Publications ==
In 1996, Meneilly authored the book Pray As You Go: On Living Your Faith in the Nineties, which is a spiritual guide for living a full life.
