= Rodger Nishioka =

American Christian preacher and educator

Rodger Nishioka is an American preacher, Seminary professor, and Christian educator. He currently serves as Senior Pastor at Village Presbyterian Church in Prairie Village, Kansas. He was previously the Benton Family Associate Professor of Christian Education at Columbia Theological Seminary. Nishioka is noted for his work with young people and his reputation as a popular "keynoter" at inter-denominational Christian youth conferences.

== Career ==
Nishioka received a B.A. from Seattle Pacific University in 1983, a M.A.T.S. degree from McCormick Theological Seminary (1998), and a Ph.D. in Social and Cultural Foundations of Education (2008) from Georgia State University. The son of a retired Presbyterian minister, Nishioka was ordained an elder in the Presbyterian Church (USA) in 1978. He taught English and Social Sciences at Curtis Junior High School in Tacoma, Washington (1978–1986), before becoming the National Coordinator for Youth and Young Adult Ministries for the Presbyterian Church (U.S.A.) from 1986 to 1999. Beginning in 2000, he served as the associate professor of Christian Education at Columbia Theological Seminary (2000–2008). Nishioka was a Benton Family Associate Professor of Christian Education at Columbia Theological Seminary before transitioning to Village Presbyterian Church.

== Thought ==
Nishioka focuses on equipping pastors to be teachers and leaders in the church's educational ministry, specializing in particular on youth and young adult ministry. He is a strong proponent of diversity in education, and states, "Good things happen when we gather in all of our diversity to work together on theological imagination and resilient leaders because imagination and resiliency are hindered by homogeneity (sameness), and enhanced by heterogeneity (differences)." He has published a number of books, and articles and has contributed many chapters to books.

His most recent research focuses on young adults, 20–30 years old, asking them "Why are so few of you sticking with us, especially, especially since we baptized and nurtured many of you?" He discovered a trend of wanting "to see how God is at work in our world—and they want us to show them how to live a more faithful life in response to God’s overwhelming grace in Jesus Christ."

== Honors ==
- Member of the Joy and Adolescent Faith and Flourishing Advisory Board of the Theology of Joy and the Good Life project based at the Yale Center for Faith & Culture (2015)
- Presbyterian Children's Homes and Related Ministries Children's Champion Award (2002)
- Austin College Doctor of Divinity (1998)
- Association of Presbyterian Church Educators Educator of the Year (1992)

== Publications ==
- Sowing the Seeds – an exploration of faith development in adolescents. (Louisville, KY: Witherspoon Street Press, 1999).
- The Roots of Who We Are – an exploration of youth ministry and Reformed Theology. (Louisville, KY: Witherspoon Street Press, 1997).
- Rooted in Love – a collection of devotionals for youth ministry leaders. (Louisville, KY: Witherspoon Street Press, 1997).
- Sticky Learning: How Neuroscience Supports Teaching That's Remembered. Contributor with Holly J. Inglis and Kathy L. Dawson (Fortress Press, 2011).
- Emerging Competencies in Youth Ministry, in OMG – A Youth Ministry Handbook. Kenda Creasy Dean, ed. (Nashville: Abingdon, 2010).
- Youth Ministry Lives in a Culture, in Youth Ministry Playbook for the Evangelical Lutheran Church in America, eds. Jeffrey S. Nelson and Jill Carroll Lafferty (Minneapolis: Augsburg Fortress, 2001).
- Treasure in Our Hearts, in Proclaiming the Great Ends of the Church. Mission and Ministry for Presbyterians. Joseph D. Small, ed. (Louisville: Geneva Press, 2010).
- Ministering to New Generations. Association of Presbyterian Church Educators Advocate, vol. 31, no. 4 (Winter 2006): 16–17.
- Preaching and Youth in a Media Culture. Journal for Preachers, vol. 24, no. 1 (Advent, 2000): 39- 44.
- Finding the Lost Generation – A hard look at ministry directed to young adults. Reformed Liturgy & Music, vol. 32, no. 1, 1998: 7–10.
