= John Anderson (theologian) =

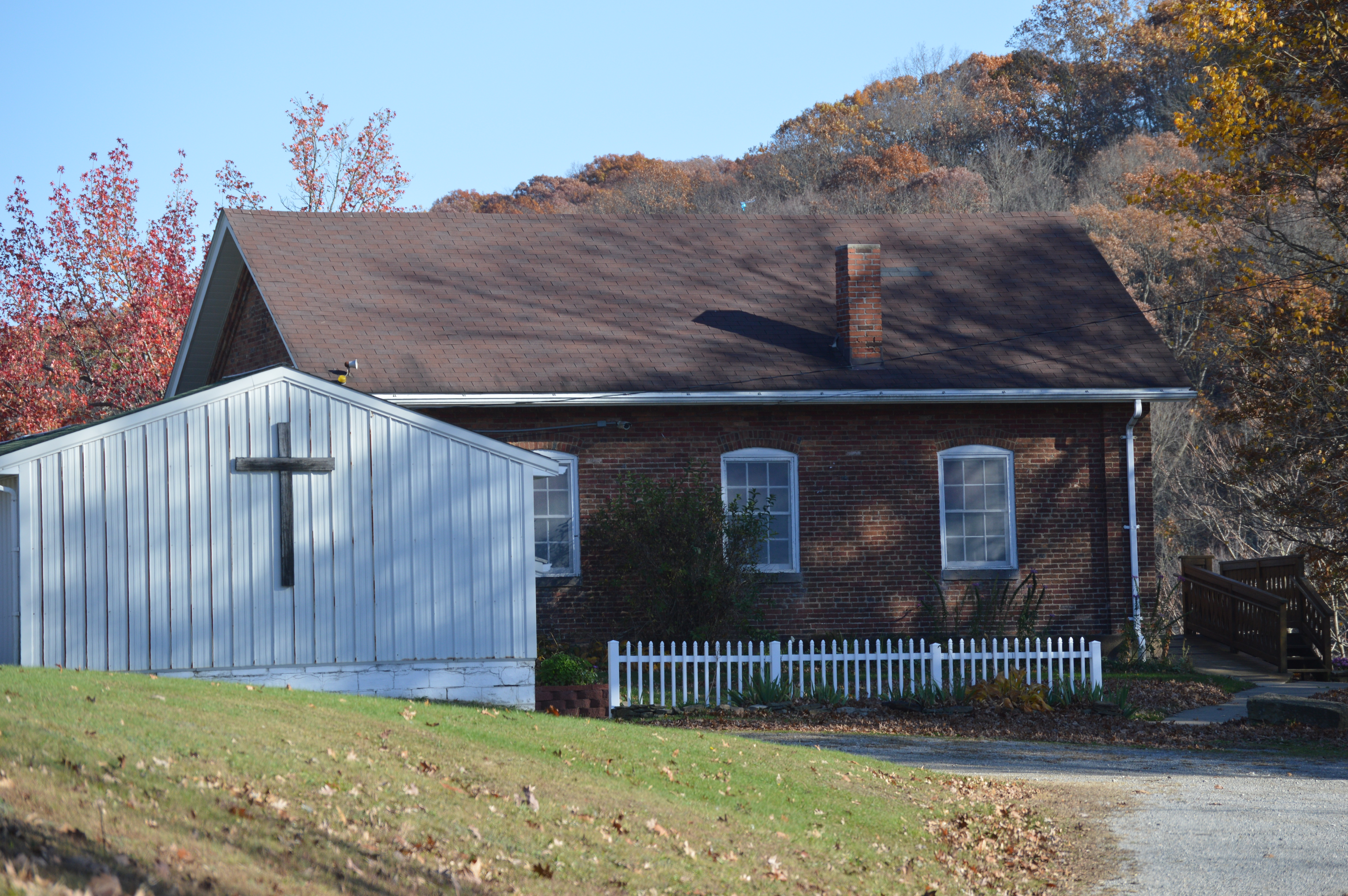
The current building of Anderson's congregation, originally Service APC

John Anderson (1748 – 6 April 1830) was an Associate Presbyterian theologian.

He was born in the far north of England, by the River Tweed. He was brought up as a member of the Associate Presbyterian Church of Scotland and became a minister. He sailed to the United States in June 1783, studied for four years, and was ordained in Philadelphia 31 October 1788. He later became the founding professor of one of the first Presbyterian seminaries in the United States, which later became Pittsburgh Theological Seminary, founded in 1794.

He was no more than five feet tall, with black, piercing eyes and tangled hair, and gained a reputation for absent mindedness through his practice of reading a book while riding to church, not noticing when the horse wandered off the route. Anderson was the founding minister of the Service Associate Presbyterian Church (later part of the United Presbyterian Church of North America) in present-day Raccoon Township, Beaver County, Pennsylvania.

He wrote the book Alexander and Rufus: Dialogues on Church Communion. The first part of that book argues for the historic Presbyterian and Reformed doctrines of confessional membership and close communion. The second part of that book defends the Testimony of the Secession Church of Scotland, and its daughter church in North America variously known as the Associate Synod and Associate Presbyterian church.

Anderson is also known for his extensive work defending the traditional Presbyterian practice of exclusive psalm singing, Vindiciae Cantus Dominici, published in revised form in 1800.
