= Phoenician (Unicode block) =

- Range: U+10900..U+1091F (32 code points)
- Plane: SMP
- Scripts: Phoenician
- Assigned: 29 code points
- Unused: 3 reserved code points

Unicode version history
- 5.0 (2006): 27 (+27)
- 5.2 (2009): 29 (+2)

Unicode documentation
- Code chart ∣ Web page

Phoenician is a Unicode block containing characters used across the Mediterranean world from the 12th century BCE to the 3rd century CE. The Phoenician alphabet was added to the Unicode Standard in July 2006 with the release of version 5.0. An alternative proposal to handle it as a font variation of Hebrew was turned down. (See PDF summary.)

The Unicode block for Phoenician is U+10900–U+1091F. It is intended for the representation of text in Paleo-Hebrew, Archaic Phoenician, Phoenician, Early Aramaic, Late Phoenician cursive, Phoenician papyri, Siloam Hebrew, Hebrew seals, Ammonite, Moabite and Punic.

The letters are encoded U+10900 𐤀 aleph through to U+10915 𐤕 taw, U+10916 𐤖, U+10917 𐤗, U+10918 𐤘 and U+10919 𐤙 encode the numerals 1, 10, 20, and 100, respectively, and U+1091F 𐤟 is the word separator.

== Characters ==
Phoenician^{[1]}^{[2]} Official Unicode Consortium code chart (PDF)
	0	1	2	3	4	5	6	7	8	9	A	B	C	D	E	F
U+1090x	𐤀	𐤁	𐤂	𐤃	𐤄	𐤅	𐤆	𐤇	𐤈	𐤉	𐤊	𐤋	𐤌	𐤍	𐤎	𐤏
U+1091x	𐤐	𐤑	𐤒	𐤓	𐤔	𐤕	𐤖	𐤗	𐤘	𐤙	𐤚	𐤛				𐤟
Notes: 1. As of Unicode version 16.0; 2. Grey areas indicate non-assigned code points

== History ==
The following Unicode-related documents record the purpose and process of defining specific characters in the Phoenician block:

Version	Final code points (Note: Proposed code points and characters names may differ from final code points and names)	Count	L2 ID	WG2 ID	Document
5.0	U+10900..10919, 1091F	27		N1579	Everson, Michael (1997-05-27), Proposal for encoding the Phoenician script
5.0	U+10900..10919, 1091F	27	L2/97-288	N1603	Umamaheswaran, V. S. (1997-10-24), "8.24.1", Unconfirmed Meeting Minutes, WG 2 Meeting # 33, Heraklion, Crete, Greece, 20 June – 4 July 1997
5.0	U+10900..10919, 1091F	27	L2/99-013	N1932	Everson, Michael (1998-11-23), Revised proposal for encoding the Phoenician script in the UCS
5.0	U+10900..10919, 1091F	27	L2/99-224	N2097, N2025-2	Röllig, W. (1999-07-23), Comments on proposals for the Universal Multiple-Octed Coded Character Set
5.0	U+10900..10919, 1091F	27		N2133	Response to comments on the question of encoding Old Semitic scripts in the UCS (N2097), 1999-10-04
5.0	U+10900..10919, 1091F	27	L2/00-010	N2103	Umamaheswaran, V. S. (2000-01-05), "10.4", Minutes of WG 2 meeting 37, Copenhagen, Denmark: 1999-09-13—16
5.0	U+10900..10919, 1091F	27	L2/04-149		Kass, James; Anderson, Deborah W.; Snyder, Dean; Lehmann, Reinhard G.; Cowie, Paul James; Kirk, Peter; Cowan, John; Khalaf, S. George; Richmond, Bob (2004-05-25), Miscellaneous Input on Phoenician Encoding Proposal
5.0	U+10900..10919, 1091F	27	L2/04-141R2	N2746R2	Everson, Michael (2004-05-29), Final proposal for encoding the Phoenician script in the UCS
5.0	U+10900..10919, 1091F	27	L2/04-177		Anderson, Deborah (2004-05-31), Expert Feedback on Phoenician
5.0	U+10900..10919, 1091F	27	L2/04-178	N2772	Anderson, Deborah (2004-06-04), Additional Support for Phoenician
5.0	U+10900..10919, 1091F	27	L2/04-181		Keown, Elaine (2004-06-04), REBUTTAL to "Final proposal for encoding the Phoenician script in the UCS"
5.0	U+10900..10919, 1091F	27	L2/04-190	N2787	Everson, Michael (2004-06-06), Additional examples of the Phoenician script in use
5.0	U+10900..10919, 1091F	27	L2/04-187		McGowan, Rick (2004-06-07), Phoenician Recommendation
5.0	U+10900..10919, 1091F	27	L2/04-206	N2793	Kirk, Peter (2004-06-07), Response to the revised "Final proposal for encoding the Phoenician script" (L2/04-141R2)
5.0	U+10900..10919, 1091F	27	L2/04-213		Rosenne, Jony (2004-06-07), Responses to Several Hebrew Related Items
5.0	U+10900..10919, 1091F	27	L2/04-217R		Keown, Elaine (2004-06-07), Proposal to add Archaic Mediterranean Script block to ISO 10646
5.0	U+10900..10919, 1091F	27	L2/04-226		Durusau, Patrick (2004-06-07), Statement of the Society of Biblical Literature on WG2 N2746R2
5.0	U+10900..10919, 1091F	27	L2/04-218	N2792	Snyder, Dean (2004-06-08), Response to the Proposal to Encode Phoenician in Unicode
5.0	U+10900..10919, 1091F	27	L2/05-009	N2909	Anderson, Deborah (2005-01-19), Letters in support of Phoenician
5.2	U+1091A..1091B	2		N3353 (pdf, doc)	Umamaheswaran, V. S. (2007-10-10), "M51.14", Unconfirmed minutes of WG 2 meeting 51 Hanzhou, China; 2007-04-24/27
5.2	U+1091A..1091B	2	L2/07-206	N3284	Everson, Michael (2007-07-25), Proposal to add two numbers for the Phoenician script
5.2	U+1091A..1091B	2	L2/07-225		Moore, Lisa (2007-08-21), "Phoenician", UTC #112 Minutes
