= Tel Zayit abecedary =

10th century BCE Paleo-Hebrew inscription

Zayit Stone
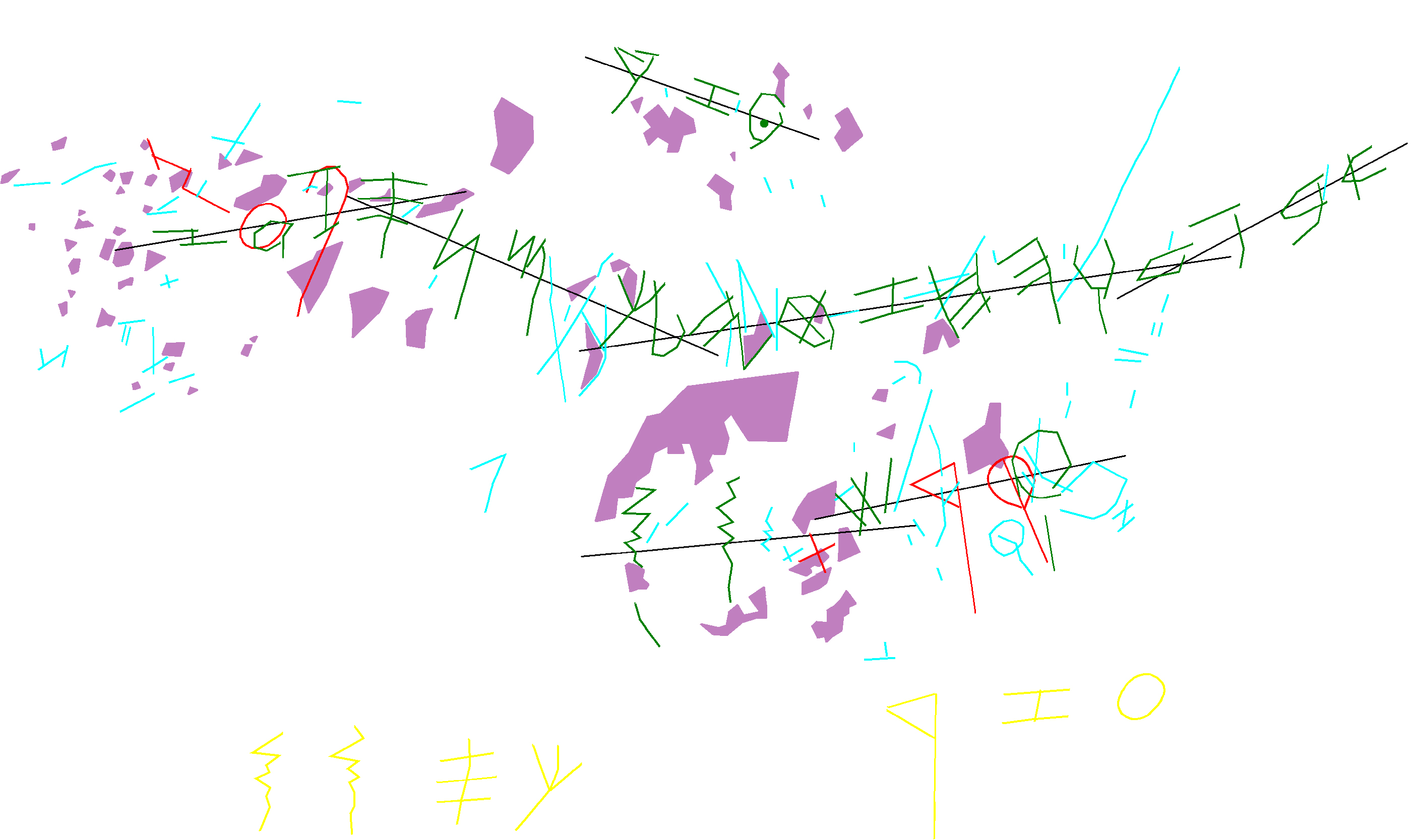
- Drawing of inscription on the Zayit Stone
- Material: Limestone boulder
- Size: 38 pounds (17 kg)
- Writing: Phoenician/Paleo-Hebrew
- Created: 10th c. BCE
- Discovered: 2005

The Zayit Stone is a 38-pound (17 kg) limestone boulder dating to the 10th century BCE, discovered on 15 July 2005 at Tel Zayit (Zeitah) in the Guvrin Valley, about 50 kilometres (31 mi) southwest of Jerusalem. The boulder measures 37.5 by 27 by 15.7 centimetres (14.8 in × 10.6 in × 6.2 in) and was embedded in the stone wall of a building. It is the earliest known example of the complete Phoenician or Paleo-Hebrew alphabet as it had developed after the Bronze Age collapse out of the Proto-Canaanite alphabet.

The flat side of the boulder is inscribed with a complete abecedary, although in a different order to the traditional version. The first line contains eighteen letters (aleph through tsadi), while the second contains the remaining four letters (qoph through tav) followed by two enigmatic zigzag symbols.

== Description ==
One side of the stone carries the Northwest Semitic (Phoenician) abecedary extending over two lines:

Rendered in the modern Hebrew alphabet, this corresponds to the sequence:

א ב ג ד ו ה ח ז ט י ל כ מ נ ס ע פ צ
ק ר ש ת

In other words, the Zayit abecedary has the order ו ה ח ז ט י ל כ compared to the standard Semitic abjad order of ה ו ז ח ט י כ ל, switching the positions of he and waw, of zayin and heth, and of kaph and lamedh.

The very top line of the inscription contain the letters:

In the modern Hebrew alphabet this translates to עזר, transliterated ʿzr. This is the given name Ezer (Hebrew: עֵזֶר, romanized: ‘ēzer, lit. 'help, helper').

The side opposite this inscription has a bowl-shaped depression measuring 18.5 by 14.5 by 6.7 centimetres (7.3 in × 5.7 in × 2.6 in), a volume of approximately 1.8 litres (110 cu in). Other similar ground stone objects have been recovered at Tel Zayit. Their function is uncertain, but "they may have served as mortars, door sockets, or basins of some kind."

== Discovery ==
The stone was discovered on July 15, 2005, by volunteer excavator, Dan Rypma, during excavations under the direction of Ron E. Tappy of Pittsburgh Theological Seminary at Tel Zayit as part of the archeological excavations which took place during the 1999–2001, 2005, 2007, and 2009–2011 seasons.

The inscription was discovered in situ in what appears to be a tertiary usage as part of wall 2307/2389 in square O19. Like the Gezer calendar, the abecedary is an important witness to the letter forms in use in the Levant in the early Iron Age.

== Significance ==
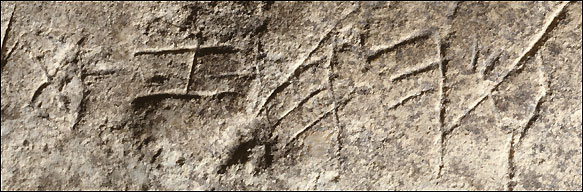
It consists of the first letters of the Phoenician/Paleo-Hebrew alphabet: 𐤅𐤄𐤇𐤆𐤈 (right-to-left: wāw, hē, ḥēt, zayin, ṭēt).

The Tel Zayit abecedary adds to the corpus of inland Canaanite alphabetic inscriptions from the early Iron Age and thus provides additional evidence for literacy in the region during this period. While claiming a certain "level" of literacy on the basis of this and similar inscriptions is notoriously difficult, Carr (2008) argued that because "Tel Zayit is... small enough and distant enough from Jerusalem... the presence of this inscription there might be taken as testimony of more widespread writing across more far-flung and minor administrative centers of Judah."

In addition to preserving writing as such, the inscription preserves an ordered sequence of letters, though this differs at points from those of other abecedaries from the Late Bronze and Iron Age Levant. Particularly, waw is placed before he, het is placed before zayin, and lamed is placed before kaph. In this last instance, a large X appears to mark a mistake realized by the scribe himself.

There has been some disagreement as to whether the inscription should be associated with the coastal (Phoenician) or highland (Hebrew) cultural sphere. Consequently, there has been debate on whether the letters should be described as "Phoenician", "Paleo-Hebrew", or more broadly as "South Canaanite." Tappy et al. (2006) associated the inscription with the early Kingdom of Judah. This interpretation has been challenged on both palaeographic and archaeological grounds.

In addition to the above broad historical concerns, the inscription is significant primarily due to the light it sheds on the development of letter forms in the southern Canaanite interior of the early Iron Age. Because the stratigraphy of the site and the date of the inscription itself are still debated, it is difficult to come to any definite historical or chronologically absolute conclusions.

== See also ==
- Paleo-Hebrew
- Gezer calendar
- Biblical archaeology

== Notes ==
=== References ===
Excavation website

- The Zeitah Excavations Archived 2007-08-20 at the Wayback Machine

Academic books and articles

- Carr, David M. (2008). "The Tel Zayit Abecedary in (social) context". In Ron E. Tappy & Peter Kyle McCarter (ed.). Literate Culture and Tenth-Century Canaan: the Tel Zayit Abecedary in Context. Winona Lake, IN: Eisenbrauns. pp. 113–129. ISBN 9781575061504.
- Finkelstein, Israel; Sass, Benjamin; Singer-Avitz, Lily (2008). "Writing in Iron IIA philistia in the light of the Tẹ̄l Zayit/Zētā abecedary". Zeitschrift des Deutschen Palästina-Vereins. 124 (1): 1–14. JSTOR 27931826.
- McCarter, Peter Kyle (2008). "Paleographic notes on the Tel Zayit Abecedary". In Ron E. Tappy & Peter Kyle McCarter (ed.). Literate Culture and Tenth-Century Canaan: the Tel Zayit Abecedary in Context. Winona Lake, IN: Eisenbrauns. pp. 45–60. ISBN 9781575061504.
- Rollston, Christopher A. (2008). "The Phoenician Script of the Tel Zayit Abecedary and Putative Evidence for Israelite Literacy". In Ron E. Tappy & Peter Kyle McCarter (ed.). Literate Culture and Tenth-Century Canaan: the Tel Zayit Abecedary in Context (PDF). Winona Lake, IN: Eisenbrauns. pp. 61–96. ISBN 9781575061504.
- Sanders, Seth L. (2008). "Writing and early Iron Age Israel: before national scripts, beyond nations and states". In Ron E. Tappy & Peter Kyle McCarter (ed.). Literate Culture and Tenth-Century Canaan: the Tel Zayit Abecedary in Context. Winona Lake, IN: Eisenbrauns. pp. 97–112. ISBN 9781575061504.
- Tappy, Ron E. (2000). "The 1998 preliminary survey of Khirbet Zeitah el-Kharab (Tel Zayit) in the Shephelah of Judah". Bulletin of the American Schools of Oriental Research. 319: 7–36. JSTOR 1357558.
- Tappy, Ron E.; McCarter, P. Kyle; Lundberg, Marilyn J.; Zuckerman, Bruce (2006). "An abecedary of the mid-tenth century B.C.E. from the Judaean Shephelah". Bulletin of the American Schools of Oriental Research. 344: 5–46. JSTOR 25066976.
- Tappy, Ron E. (2008). "Tel Zayit and the Tel Zayit Abecedary in their regional context". In Ron E. Tappy & Peter Kyle McCarter (ed.). Literate Culture and Tenth-Century Canaan: the Tel Zayit Abecedary in Context. Winona Lake, IN: Eisenbrauns. pp. 1–44. ISBN 9781575061504.
- Tappy, Ron E. (2011). "The depositional history of Iron Age Tel Zayit: a Response to Finkelstein, Sass, and Lily Singer-Avitz". Eretz-Israel. 30: 127*–143*.
- Tappy, Ron E.; McCarter, Peter Kyle (eds.). Literate Culture and Tenth-Century Canaan: the Tel Zayit Abecedary in Context. Winona Lake, IN: Eisenbrauns. ISBN 9781575061504.
