= Lee Anna Starr =

American Methodist minister

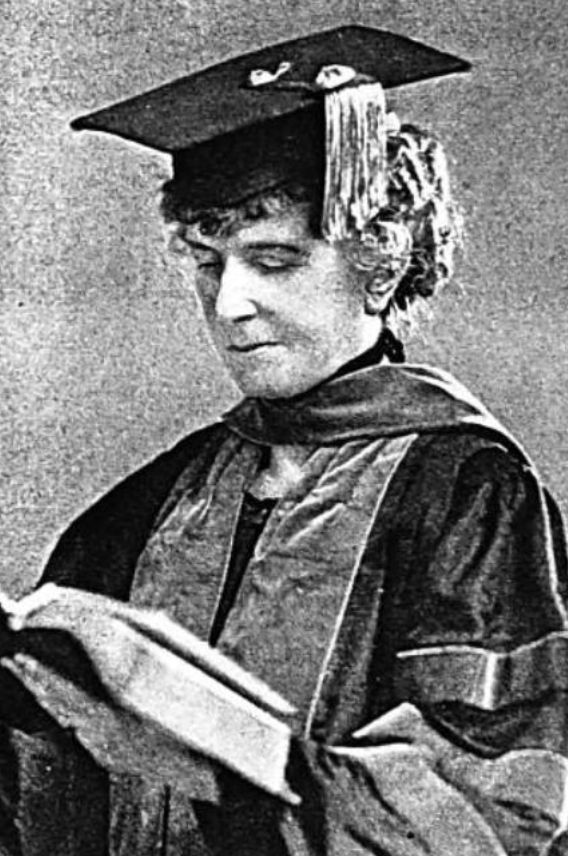
- Lee Anna Starr, from the frontispiece of her 1926 book
- Born: January 6, 1853; Point Pleasant, West Virginia, U.S.
- Died: January 10, 1937 (age 84); Pittsburgh, Pennsylvania, U.S.
- Occupations: Methodist minister, translator, temperance worker, classical scholar, writer

Lee Anna Starr (January 6, 1853 – January 10, 1937) was an American Methodist minister, temperance and suffrage activist, and writer. She was an ordained minister in the Methodist Protestant Church.

== Early life and education ==
Starr was born in Point Pleasant, West Virginia, the daughter of David Lee Starr and Sarah Jane Harper Starr. Her father was a physician and an ordained minister. She attended high school in Athens, Ohio, and was the first woman to graduate from Allegheny Theological Seminary (a predecessor of Pittsburgh Theological Seminary), in 1893. She earned her Doctor of Divinity degree at Kansas City University in 1911.

== Career ==
Starr was pastor of churches in Canton, Illinois, Paris, Illinois, Adrian, Michigan, Bellevue, Pennsylvania, and Avalon Park, Chicago. In 1905 she made headlines when she discussed her refusal to perform marriage ceremonies for people who were divorced, though that policy was in keeping with her denomination's stance at the time, and she made exceptions. She addressed the 1922 and 1923 meetings of the International Association of Women Preachers.

Starr's The Bible Status of Woman (1926) laid out several feminist interpretations of women's roles in the Bible, based in her understanding of Greek and Hebrew texts. "One cannot but admire the author of this remarkable book for her broad information, scholarship and painstaking research," commented a 1927 reviewer, who highlighted Starr's "surprisingly strong argument" for Priscilla as the author of the Epistle to the Hebrews.

Beyond her religious work, Starr took an active interest in social reforms. She was arrested three times for picketing saloons in Pittsburgh, and eventually served a brief jail sentence for "praying in front of saloon" with her sisters. She organized women's suffrage groups in Pennsylvania, and was a lecturer for the National Woman Suffrage Association and the Women's Christian Temperance Union (WCTU). She spoke at the National Prison Association's annual conference in 1904.

== Publications ==
- The Ministry of Woman (1900)
- "Where is My Soldier Boy Tonight?" (1918, sheet music; words and music by Starr)
- The Bible Status of Woman (1926)

== Personal life ==
Starr died in 1937, at the age of 84, in Pittsburgh.
