= Phoenician alphabet =

Writing system used c. 1050 to 146 BC

Phoenician script
- The twenty-two letters of the Phoenician alphabet, which are read right to left
- Script type: Abjad
- Period: c. 1050–146 BC (Note: The date of 1050 BC is conventional. The oldest known inscriptions are from the 10th century BC; the predecessor scripts used in the Syro-Hittite states of the 13th to 12th centuries BC is classified as "Proto-Canaanite". Greek travelers shared their alphabet with the people living there who made a new mix of the Greek alphabet, which the Greeks adopted. Use of the Phoenician script declined during the Hellenistic period as its evolved forms replaced it; it became obsolete with the destruction of Carthage in 146 BC.)
- Direction: Right-to-left
- Languages: Phoenician, Hebrew, Punic, Old Aramaic, Ammonite, Moabite, Edomite, Old Arabic

Related scripts
- Parent systems: Egyptian hieroglyphs: Proto-Sinaitic; Phoenician script
- Child systems: Aramaic; Greek; Paleohispanic; Paleo-Hebrew; ? Libyco-Berber
- Sister systems: South Semitic

ISO 15924
- ISO 15924: Phnx (115), Phoenician

Unicode
- Unicode alias: Phoenician
- Unicode range: U+10900–U+1091F

The Phoenician alphabet or script was an alphabet used by the Phoenician people for most of the 1st millennium BC. It developed directly from the Proto-Sinaitic script, which was derived in turn from Egyptian hieroglyphs. It originated during the Late Bronze Age on the Levantine coast of the eastern Mediterranean, primarily in present-day Lebanon. Over time it was widely disseminated outside of the Canaanite sphere across the Mediterranean by Phoenician merchants, where it was adopted and adapted by other cultures. It was one of the first alphabets, attested in Canaanite and Aramaic inscriptions found across the Mediterranean basin.

Like most of the Semitic scripts, the Phoenician script had a fixed writing direction, being written horizontally, from right to left, and was an abjad (consonantal alphabet). Like other Semitic scripts, the Phoenician script proper used 22 consonant letters, leaving vowel sounds implied—though late varieties sometimes used matres lectionis to denote some vowels. As its letters were originally incised using a stylus, their forms are mostly angular and straight, though cursive forms increased in use over time, culminating in the Neo-Punic alphabet used in Roman North Africa.

The Phoenician script was used to write Canaanite languages spoken during the Early Iron Age, sub-categorized by historians as Phoenician, Paleo-Hebrew, Moabite, Ammonite and Edomite. The Phoenician alphabet proper was used in Ancient Carthage until the 2nd century BC, when it was used to write the Punic language. Its direct descendant scripts include the Aramaic and Samaritan alphabets, several Alphabets of Asia Minor, and the Archaic Greek alphabets.

== History ==
The Phoenician alphabet similar to that used on the Mesha Stele

=== Origin ===
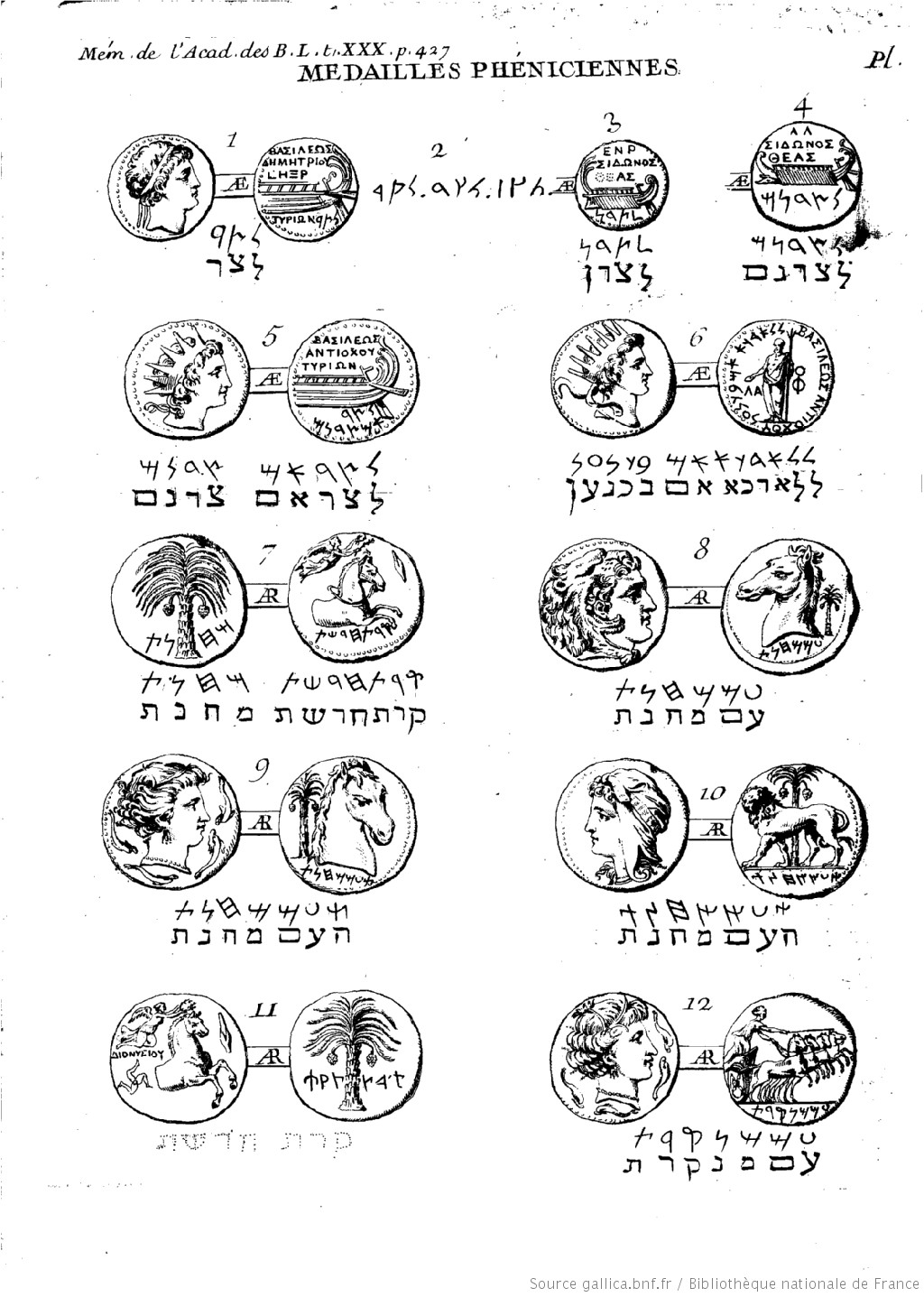
Study of Phoenician medals, by Jean-Jacques Barthélemy

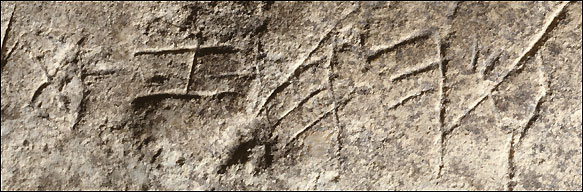
Photograph of section of the Zayit Stone, 10th century BC: (right-to-left) the letters waw, he, het, zayin, tet (𐤅𐤄𐤇𐤆𐤈)

The earliest known proto-alphabetic inscriptions are the Proto-Sinaitic script sporadically attested in the Sinai Peninsula and in Canaan in the late Middle and Late Bronze Age. The script was not widely used until the rise of Syro-Hittite states in the 13th and 12th centuries BC.

The Phoenician script is a direct continuation of the "Proto-Canaanite" script of the Bronze Age collapse period. The inscriptions found on the Phoenician arrowheads at al-Khader near Bethlehem and dated c. 1100 BC offered the epigraphists the "missing link" between the two. The Ahiram epitaph, whose dating is controversial, engraved on the sarcophagus of king Ahiram in Byblos, Lebanon, one of five known Byblian royal inscriptions, shows essentially the fully developed Phoenician script, although the name "Phoenician" is by convention given to inscriptions beginning in the mid-11th century BC.

However, the "Proto-Canaanite" theory isn't the full picture since the still undeciphered and potentially older Byblos syllabary also shared many similar letter shapes with the Phoenician alphabet. It has been shown that some of the oldest known Phoenician inscriptions were written over older inscriptions in this syllabary. One example of these palimpsests are the Byblos Bronze spatulas.

=== Spread and adaptations ===
Beginning in the 9th century BC, adaptations of the Phoenician alphabet thrived, including Greek, Old Italic and Anatolian scripts. The alphabet's attractive innovation was its phonetic nature, in which one sound was represented by one symbol, which meant only a few dozen symbols to learn. The other scripts of the time, cuneiform and Egyptian hieroglyphs, employed many complex characters and required long professional training to achieve proficiency; which had restricted literacy to a small elite.

Another reason for its success was the maritime trading culture of Phoenician merchants, which spread the alphabet into parts of North Africa and Southern Europe. Phoenician inscriptions have been found in archaeological sites at a number of former Phoenician cities and colonies around the Mediterranean, such as Byblos (in present-day Lebanon) and Carthage in North Africa. Later finds indicate earlier use in Egypt.

The alphabet had long-term effects on the social structures of the civilizations that came in contact with it. Its simplicity not only allowed its easy adaptation to multiple languages, but it also allowed the common people to learn how to write. This upset the long-standing status of literacy as an exclusive achievement of royal and religious elites, scribes who used their monopoly on information to control the common population. The appearance of Phoenician disintegrated many of these class divisions, although many Middle Eastern kingdoms, such as Assyria, Babylonia and Adiabene, would continue to use cuneiform for legal and liturgical matters well into the Common Era.

According to Herodotus, the Phoenician prince Cadmus was accredited with the introduction of the Phoenician alphabet—phoinikeia grammata 'Phoenician letters'—to the Greeks, who adapted it to form their Greek alphabet. Herodotus claims that the Greeks did not know of the Phoenician alphabet before Cadmus. He estimates that Cadmus lived 1600 years before his time, while the historical adoption of the alphabet by the Greeks was barely 350 years before Herodotus.

The Phoenician alphabet was known to the Jewish sages of the Second Temple era, who called it the "Old Hebrew" (Paleo-Hebrew) script.

=== Notable inscriptions ===
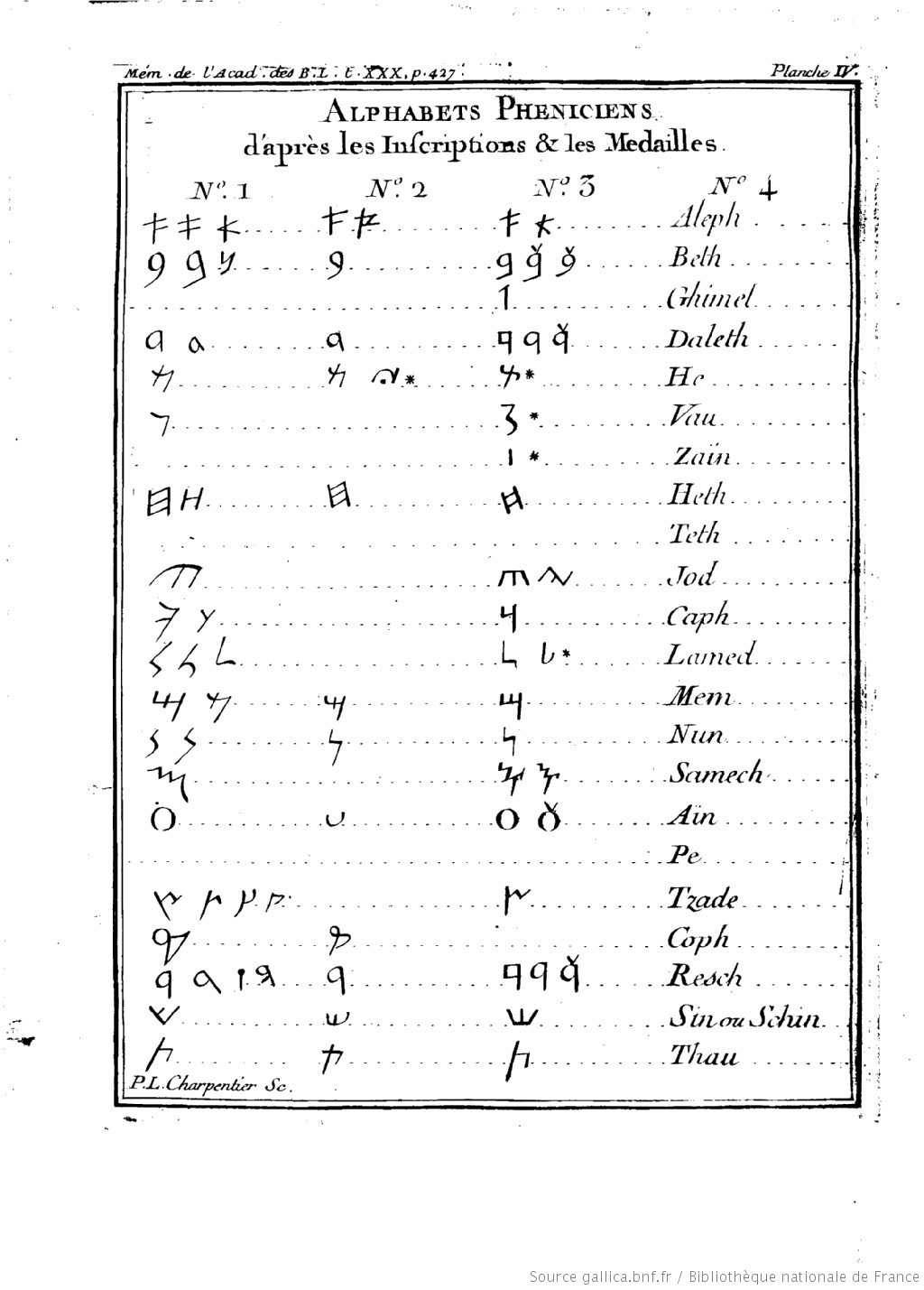
Phoenician alphabet, deciphered by Jean-Jacques Barthélemy in 1758. No.1 is from the Cippi of Melqart, No.2 is from the coins, and No. 3 is from the Pococke Kition inscriptions.

The conventional date of 1050 BC for the emergence of the Phoenician script was chosen because there is a gap in the epigraphic record; there are not actually any Phoenician inscriptions securely dated to the 11th century. The oldest inscriptions are dated to the 10th century.

- KAI 1: Ahiram sarcophagus, Byblos, c. 1000 BC.
- KAI 14: Sarcophagus of Eshmunazar II, 5th century BC
- KAI 15–16: Bodashtart inscriptions, 4th century BC
- KAI 24: Kilamuwa Stela, 9th century BC
- KAI 46: Nora Stone, c. 800 BC
- KAI 47: Cippi of Melqart inscription, 2nd century BC
- KAI 26: Karatepe bilingual, 8th century BC
- KAI 277: Pyrgi Tablets, Phoenician-Etruscan bilingual, c. 500 BC
- Çineköy inscription, Phoenician-Luwian bilingual, 8th century BC

The General Directorate of Antiquities of Lebanon has assembled a list of inscribed objects from different time periods that together illustrate the evolution of the Phoenician script. The objects are Lebanese state property and displayed in the National Museum of Beirut, with occasional loans to other institutions. The oldest of them is the Ahiram sarcophagus. This collection formed the basis of a nomination of the Phoenician alphabet to the Memory of the World International Register. UNESCO accepted the nomination in 2005, recognising the alphabet as documentary heritage of global importance.

=== Modern rediscovery ===
The Phoenician script was deciphered in 1758 by Jean-Jacques Barthélemy, but its relation to the Phoenicians remained unknown until the 19th century. It was at first believed that the script was a direct variation of Egyptian hieroglyphs, which were deciphered by Champollion in the early 19th century.

However, scholars could not find any link between the two writing systems, nor to hieratic or cuneiform. The theories of independent creation ranged from the idea of a single individual conceiving it, to the Hyksos people forming it from corrupt Egyptian. It was eventually discovered that the Proto-Sinaitic alphabet was inspired by the model of hieroglyphs.

== Table of letters ==
The charts show the graphical evolution of Phoenician letter forms into other scripts. The sound values also changed significantly, both at the initial creation of new scripts and from gradual pronunciation changes which did not immediately lead to spelling changes. The Phoenician letter forms shown are idealized: actual Phoenician writing is less uniform, with significant variations by era and region.

Origin			Phoenician						
Egyptian hieroglyphs	Proto- Sinaitic	Proto- Canaanite	Image	Text	Name	Meaning	Pronunciation	Transliteration	
Egyptian hieroglyphs	Proto- Sinaitic	Proto- Canaanite	Image	Text	Name	Meaning	Pronunciation	Phoneme	Name
𓃾			Aleph	𐤀	Alp	ox, head of cattle	[ʔ]	ʔ/ʾ	ʔalp
𓉐			Beth	𐤁	Bet	house	[b]	b	bēt
𓌙			Gimel	𐤂	Gaml	throwing stick (or camel)	[ɡ]	g	gaml
𓉿			Daleth	𐤃	Dalt	door (or fish)	[d]	d	dalt
𓀠?			He	𐤄	He	window	[h]	h	hē
𓏲			Waw	𐤅	Waw	hook	[w]	w	wāw
𓏭			Zayin	𐤆	Zen	weapon	[z]	z	zēn
𓉗 / 𓈈?			Heth	𐤇	Het	courtyard/wall (?)	[ħ]	ħ/ḥ	ħēt
𓄤?			Teth	𐤈	Tet	wheel (Note: The glyph was taken to represent a wheel, but it possibly derives from the hieroglyph nefer hieroglyph 𓄤 and would originally have been called tab טוב 'good'.)	[tʼ]	ṭ	ṭēt
𓂝	Proto-semiticI-01		Yodh	𐤉	Yod	arm, hand	[j]	j	yōd
𓂧			Kaph	𐤊	Kap	palm of a hand	[k]	k	kap
𓌅			Lamedh	𐤋	Lamd	goad	[l]	l	lamd
𓈖			Mem	𐤌	Mem	water	[m]	m	mēm
𓆓			Nun	𐤍	Nun	serpent (or fish) (Note: the letter name nūn is a word for "fish", but the glyph is presumably from the depiction of a snake, which would point to an original name נחש "snake".)	[n]	n	nūn
𓊽	Proto-semiticX-01 Proto-semiticX-02		Samekh	𐤎	Samk	pillar(?)	[s]	s	samk
𓁹	Proto-semiticO-01	𐤏	Ayin	𐤏	En	eye	[ʕ]	ʕ/ʿ	ʕēn
𓂋			Pe	𐤐	Pe	mouth (or corner)	[p]	p	pē
𓇑? (Note: the letter name may be from צד "to hunt".)			Sadek	𐤑	Sade	papyrus plant/fish hook?	[t͡sʼ]	ṣ	ṣādē
𓃻?			Qoph	𐤒	Qop	monkey (or needle)	[kʼ]	ḳ/q	ḳōp
𓁶			Res	𐤓	Rosh	head	[r]	r	rōš
𓌓			Sin	𐤔	Shin	tooth (or sun)	[ʃ]	š	šin
𓏴			Taw	𐤕	Taw	mark	[t]	t	tāw

When alphabetic writing began, with the early Greek alphabet, the letter forms were similar but not identical to Phoenician, and vowels were added to the consonant-only Phoenician script. There were also distinct variants of the writing system in different parts of Greece, primarily in how those Phoenician characters that did not have an exact match to Greek sounds were used. The Ionic variant evolved into the standard Greek alphabet, and the Cumae variant into the Italic alphabets (including the Latin alphabet).

The Runic alphabet is derived from Italic, the Cyrillic alphabet from medieval Greek. The Hebrew, Syriac and Arabic scripts are derived from Aramaic (the latter as a medieval cursive variant of Nabataean). Ge'ez is from South Arabian.

Phoenician	Libyco- Berber	Samaritan	Aramaic	Hebrew	Syriac	Parthian	Arabic	South Arabian	Ge'ez	Greek	Latin	Cyrillic	Brahmi	Devanagari	Tamil	Mongolian
𐤀		ࠀ	𐡀	א	ܐ	𐭀	ﺍ ,ء	𐩱	አ	Αα	Aa	Аа	𑀅 /a/	अ /a/	அ	/; (a / e / o / u / ö / ü)
𐤁		ࠁ	𐡁	ב	ܒ	𐭁	ﺏ	𐩨	በ	Ββ	Bb	Бб, Вв	𑀩 /b/	ब /b/	-	(ē / w)
𐤂		ࠂ	𐡂	ג	ܓ	𐭂	ﺝ	𐩴	ገ	Γγ	Cc, Gg	Гг, Ґґ	𑀕 /g/	ग /g/	-	(q / γ)
𐤃		ࠃ	𐡃	ד	ܕ	𐭃	ذ ,د	𐩵	ደ	Δδ	Dd	Дд	𑀥 /dʰ/	ध /dʰ/	-	—
𐤄		ࠄ	𐡄	ה	ܗ	𐭄	ه	𐩠	ሀ	Εε	Ee	Ее, Ёё, Єє, Ээ	𑀳 /ɦ/	ह /ɦ/	-	—
𐤅		ࠅ	𐡅	ו	ܘ	𐭅	ﻭ	𐩥	ወ	(Ϝϝ), Υυ	Ff, Uu, Vv, Ww, Yy	Ѕѕ, Ѵѵ, Уу, Ўў	𑀯 /v/	व /v/	வ /v/	(o / u / ö / ü / w)
𐤆	//	ࠆ	𐡆	ז	ܙ	𐭆	ﺯ	𐩸	ዘ	Ζζ	Zz	Зз	𑀚 /ɟ/	ज /dʒ/	-	—; —; (s)
𐤇		ࠇ	𐡇	ח	ܚ	𐭇	ح ,خ	𐩢	ሐ	(Ͱͱ), Ηη	Hh	Ии, Йй	𑀖 /gʰ/	घ /gʰ/	-	(q / γ)
𐤈		ࠈ	𐡈	ט	ܛ	𐭈	ط ,ظ	𐩷	ጠ	Θθ		Ѳѳ	𑀣 /tʰ/	थ /tʰ/	-	—
𐤉		ࠉ	𐡉	י	ܝ	𐭉	ي	𐩺	የ	Ιι	Ii, Jj	Іі, Її, Јј	𑀬 /j/	य /j/	ய /y/	(i / ǰ / y)
𐤊		ࠊ	𐡊	כך	ܟ	𐭊	ﻙ	𐩫	ከ	Κκ	Kk	Кк	𑀓 /k/	क /k/	க	(k / g)
𐤋		ࠋ	𐡋	ל	ܠ	𐭋	ﻝ	𐩡	ለ	Λλ	Ll	Лл	𑀮 /l/	ल /l/	ல	—; (t / d)
𐤌		ࠌ	𐡌	מם	ܡ	𐭌	ﻡ	𐩣	መ	Μμ	Mm	Мм	𑀫 /m/	म /m/	ம	(m)
𐤍	LB vertical N	ࠍ	𐡍	נן	ܢ	𐭍	ﻥ	𐩬	ነ	Νν	Nn	Нн	𑀦 /n/	न /n/	ன /ṉ/	/; /; (n)
𐤎	,	ࠎ	𐡎	ס	ܣ	𐭎	س	𐩯		Ξξ		Ѯѯ	𑀱 /ʂ/	ष /ʂ/	-	(s / š)
𐤏		ࠏ	𐡏	ע	ܥ	𐭏	ع ,غ	𐩲	ዐ	Οο, Ωω	Oo	Оо, Ѡѡ	𑀏 /e/	ए /e/	-	—
𐤐		ࠐ	𐡐	פף	ܦ	𐭐	ف	𐩰	ፈ	Ππ	Pp	Пп	𑀧 /p/	प /p/	ப	(b)
𐤑	/	ࠑ	𐡑	צץ	ܨ	𐭑	ص ,ض	𐩮	ጸ	(Ϻϻ)		Цц	𑀘 /c/	च /tʃ/	ச /c/	/; —; (č / ǰ)
𐤒	?	ࠒ	𐡒	ק	ܩ	𐭒	ﻕ	𐩤	ቀ	(Ϙϙ), Φφ	Qq	Ҁҁ, Фф	𑀔 /kʰ/	ख /kʰ/	-	—
𐤓		ࠓ	𐡓	ר	ܪ	𐭓	ﺭ	𐩧	ረ	Ρρ	Rr	Рр	𑀭 /r/	र /r/	ர	(l), (r)
𐤔	,	ࠔ	𐡔	ש	ܫ	𐭔	ش	𐩦	ሠ	Σσς	Ss	Сс, Шш, Щщ	𑀰 /ɕ/	श /ɕ/	-	(s / š)
𐤕		ࠕ	𐡕	ת	ܬ	𐭕	ت, ث	𐩩	ተ	Ττ	Tt	Тт	𑀢 /t/	त /t/	த	(t / d)

== Letter names ==
Phoenician used a system of acrophony to name letters: a word was chosen with each initial consonant sound, and became the name of the letter for that sound. These names were not arbitrary: each Phoenician letter was based on an Egyptian hieroglyph representing an Egyptian word; this word was translated into Phoenician (or a closely related Semitic language), then the initial sound of the translated word became the letter's Phoenician value. For example, the second letter of the Phoenician alphabet was based on the Egyptian hieroglyph for "house" (a sketch of a house); the Semitic word for 'house' was bet; hence the Phoenician letter was called bet and had the sound value b.

Yigael Yadin (1963) went to great lengths to prove that there was actual battle equipment similar to some of the original letter forms named for weapons (samk, zen).

Later, the Greeks kept approximations of the Phoenician names, albeit they did not mean anything to them other than the letters themselves; on the other hand, the Latins (and presumably the Etruscans from whom they borrowed a variant of the Western Greek alphabet) and the Orthodox Slavs (at least when naming the Cyrillic letters, which came to them from the Greek by way of the Glagolitic) based their names purely on the letters' sounds.

== Numerals ==
The Phoenician numeral system consisted of separate symbols for 1, 10, 20, and 100. The sign for 1 was a simple vertical stroke (𐤖). Other numerals up to 9 were formed by adding the appropriate number of such strokes, arranged in groups of three. The symbol for 10 was a horizontal line or tack (𐤗). The sign for 20 (𐤘) could come in different glyph variants, one of them being a combination of two 10-tacks, approximately Z-shaped. Larger multiples of ten were formed by adding groups of vertical groups of three to the right of the ten mark. There existed several glyph variants for 100 (𐤙), with multiples to the right as with tens, e.g., 400 would be rendered 𐤖 𐤖𐤖𐤖 𐤙. The system did not contain a numeral zero.

Value	Phoenician
1	𐤖
10	𐤗
20	𐤘
100	𐤙

== Derived alphabets ==
Each letter of Phoenician gave way to a new form in its daughter scripts. Left to right: Latin, Greek, Cyrillic, Phoenician, Hebrew, Arabic.

Phoenician was prolific. Many of the writing systems in use today can ultimately trace their descent to it, so ultimately to Egyptian hieroglyphs. The Latin, Cyrillic, Armenian and Georgian scripts are derived from the Greek alphabet, which evolved from Phoenician; the Aramaic script, also descended from Phoenician, evolved into the Arabic and Hebrew scripts. It has also been theorized that the Brahmi and subsequent Brahmic scripts of the Indian cultural sphere also descended from Aramaic, effectively uniting most of the world's writing systems under one family, although the theory is disputed.

=== Early Semitic scripts ===
The Paleo-Hebrew alphabet, a sister script to the Phoenician script was used to write early Hebrew. It developed in parallel, being a slight regional variant of the Phoenician script. The Samaritan alphabet is a direct development of Paleo-Hebrew, emerging in the 6th century BC. The South Arabian script may be derived from a stage of the Proto-Sinaitic script predating the mature development of the Phoenician alphabet proper. The Geʽez script developed from South Arabian.

=== Samaritan alphabet ===
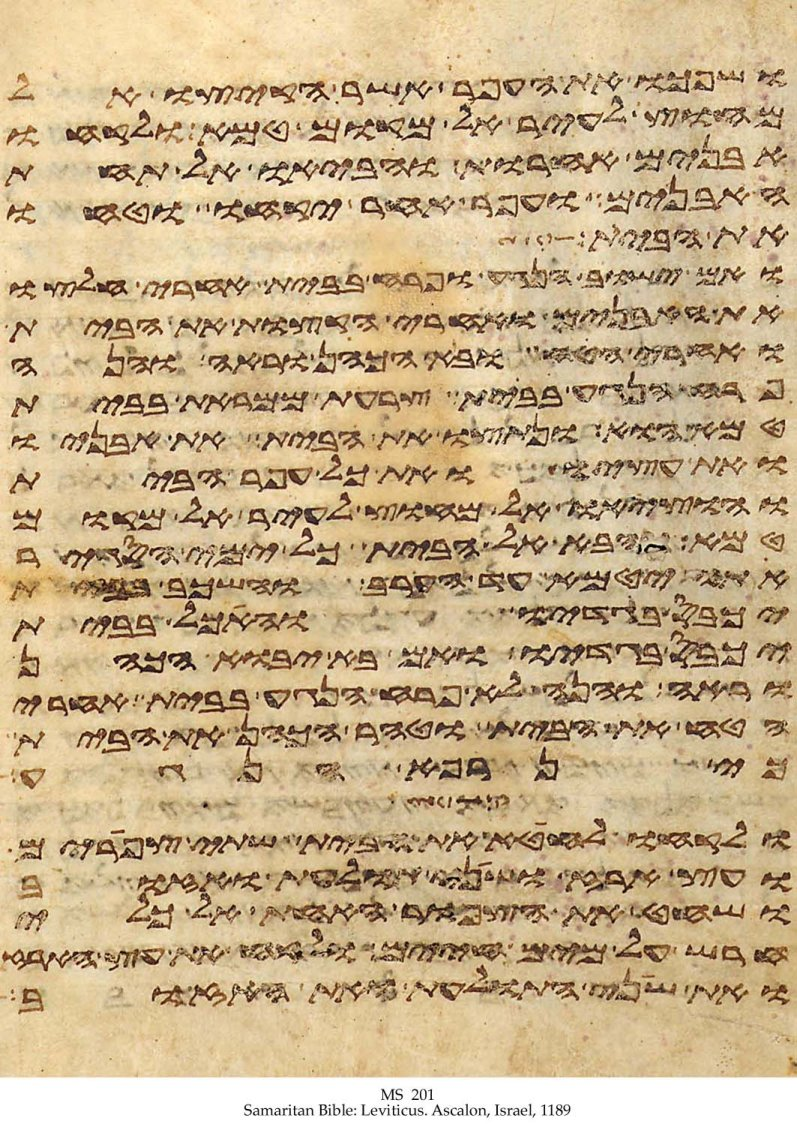
A page from the Samaritan version of Leviticus

The Phoenician script continued to be used by the Samaritans and developed into the Samaritan alphabet, that is an immediate continuation of the Phoenician script without intermediate non-Israelite evolutionary stages. The Samaritans have continued to use the script for writing both Hebrew and Aramaic texts until the present day. A comparison of the earliest Samaritan inscriptions and the medieval and modern Samaritan manuscripts clearly indicates that the Samaritan script is a static script which was used mainly as a book hand.

=== Aramaic-derived ===
The Aramaic script, used to write Aramaic, is an early descendant of Phoenician. Aramaic, being the lingua franca of the Middle East, was widely adopted. It later split off into a number of related alphabets, including Hebrew, Syriac, and Nabataean, the latter of which, in its cursive form, became an ancestor of the Arabic alphabet. The Hebrew alphabet emerges in the Second Temple period, from around 300 BC, out of the Aramaic alphabet used in the Persian empire. There was, however, a revival of the Phoenician / Old Hebrew mode of writing later in the Second Temple period, with some instances from the Qumran Caves, such as the Paleo-Hebrew Leviticus scroll dated to the 2nd or 1st century BC.

By the 5th century BC, among Jews the Phoenician alphabet had been mostly replaced by the Aramaic script as officially used in the Persian empire (which, like all alphabetical writing systems, was itself ultimately a descendant of the Proto-Canaanite script, though through intermediary non-Israelite stages of evolution). The "Jewish square-script" variant now known simply as the Hebrew alphabet evolved directly out of the Aramaic script by about the 3rd century BC (although some letter shapes did not become standard until the 1st century AD).

The Kharosthi script is an Aramaic-derived alphasyllabary used in the Indo-Greek Kingdom in the 3rd century BC. The Syriac alphabet is the derived form of Aramaic used in the early Christian period. The Sogdian alphabet is derived from Syriac. It is in turn an ancestor of the Old Uyghur. The Manichaean alphabet is a further derivation from Sogdian.

The Arabic script is a medieval cursive variant of Nabataean, itself an offshoot of Aramaic.

=== Brahmic scripts ===
It has been proposed, notably by Georg Bühler (1898), that the Brahmi script of India (and by extension the derived Indic alphabets) was ultimately derived from the Aramaic script, which would make Phoenician the ancestor of virtually every alphabetic writing system in use today, with the notable exception of hangul.

It is certain that the Aramaic-derived Kharosthi script was present in northern India by the 4th century BC, so that the Aramaic model of alphabetic writing would have been known in the region, but the link from Kharosthi to the slightly younger Brahmi is tenuous. Bühler's suggestion is still entertained in mainstream scholarship, but it has never been proven conclusively, and no definitive scholarly consensus exists.

=== Greek-derived ===
The Greek alphabet is derived from the Phoenician. With a different phonology, the Greeks adapted the Phoenician script to represent their own sounds, including the vowels absent in Phoenician. It was possibly more important in Greek to write out vowel sounds: Phoenician being a Semitic language, words were based on consonantal roots that permitted extensive removal of vowels without loss of meaning, a feature absent in the Indo-European Greek. However, Akkadian cuneiform, which wrote a related Semitic language, did indicate vowels, which suggests the Phoenicians simply accepted the model of the Egyptians, who never wrote vowels. In any case, the Greeks repurposed the Phoenician letters of consonant sounds not present in Greek; each such letter had its name shorn of its leading consonant, and the letter took the value of the now-leading vowel. For example, alp, which designated a glottal stop in Phoenician, was repurposed to represent the vowel /a/; he became /e/, het became /eː/ (a long vowel), en became /o/ (because the pharyngeality altered the following vowel), while the two semi-consonants waw and yod became the corresponding high vowels, /u/ and /i/. (Some dialects of Greek, which did possess /h/ and /w/, continued to use the Phoenician letters for those consonants as well.)

The Alphabets of Asia Minor are generally assumed to be offshoots of archaic versions of the Greek alphabet.

The Latin alphabet was derived from Old Italic (originally derived from a form of the Greek alphabet), used for Etruscan and other languages. The origin of the Runic alphabet is disputed: the main theories are that it evolved either from the Latin alphabet itself, some early Old Italic alphabet via the Alpine scripts, or the Greek alphabet. Despite this debate, the Runic alphabet is clearly derived from one or more scripts that ultimately trace their roots back to the Phoenician alphabet.

The Coptic alphabet is mostly based on the mature Greek alphabet of the Hellenistic period, with a few additional letters for sounds not in Greek at the time. Those additional letters are based on the Demotic script.

The Cyrillic script was derived from the late (medieval) Greek alphabet. Some Cyrillic letters (generally for sounds not in medieval Greek) are based on Glagolitic forms.

=== Paleohispanic scripts ===
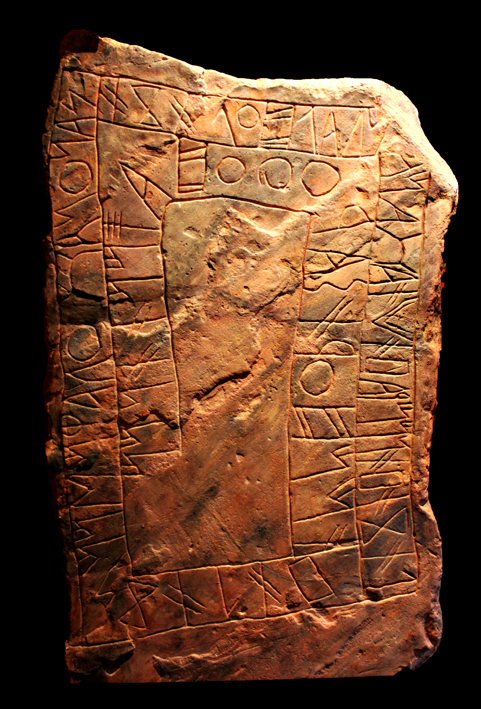
Southwest stele of Fonte Velha

These were an indigenous set of genetically related semisyllabaries, which suited the phonological characteristics of the Tartessian, Iberian and Celtiberian languages. They were deciphered in 1922 by Manuel Gómez-Moreno but their content is almost impossible to understand because they are not related to any living languages. While Gómez-Moreno first pointed to a joined Phoenician-Greek origin, following authors consider that their genesis has no relation to Greek.

The most remote script of the group is the Tartessian or Southwest script which could be one or several different scripts. The main bulk of PH inscriptions use, by far, the Northeastern Iberian script, which serves to write Iberian in the levantine coast North of Contestania and in the valle of the river Ebro (Hiber). The Iberic language is also recorded using two other scripts: the Southeastern Iberian script, which is more similar to the Southwest script than to Northeastern Iberian; and a variant of the Ionic Greek Alphabet called the Greco-Iberian alphabet. Finally, the Celtiberian script registers the language of the Celtiberians with a script derived from Northeastern Iberian, an interesting feature is that it was used and developed in times of the Roman conquest, in opposition to the Latin alphabet.

Among the distinctive features of Paleohispanic scripts are:

- Semi-syllabism. Half of the signs represent syllables made of occlusive consonants (k g b d t) and the other half represent simple phonemes such as vowels (a e i o u) and continuant consonants (l n r ŕ s ś).
- Duality. Appears on the earliest Iberian and Celtiberian inscriptions and refers to how the signs can serve a double use by being modified with an extra stroke that transforms, for example ge with a stroke becomes ke. In later stages the scripts were simplified and duality vanishes from inscriptions.
- Redundancy. A feature that appears only in the script of the Southwest, vowels are repeated after each syllabic sign.

== Unicode ==
Phoenician^{[1]}^{[2]} Official Unicode Consortium code chart (PDF)
	0	1	2	3	4	5	6	7	8	9	A	B	C	D	E	F
U+1090x	𐤀	𐤁	𐤂	𐤃	𐤄	𐤅	𐤆	𐤇	𐤈	𐤉	𐤊	𐤋	𐤌	𐤍	𐤎	𐤏
U+1091x	𐤐	𐤑	𐤒	𐤓	𐤔	𐤕	𐤖	𐤗	𐤘	𐤙	𐤚	𐤛				𐤟
Notes 1.As of Unicode version 18.0 2.Grey areas indicate non-assigned code points

== See also ==
- History of writing
- History of the alphabet
- Ugaritic alphabet
