= Robert A. J. Gagnon =

American theological writer (born 1958)

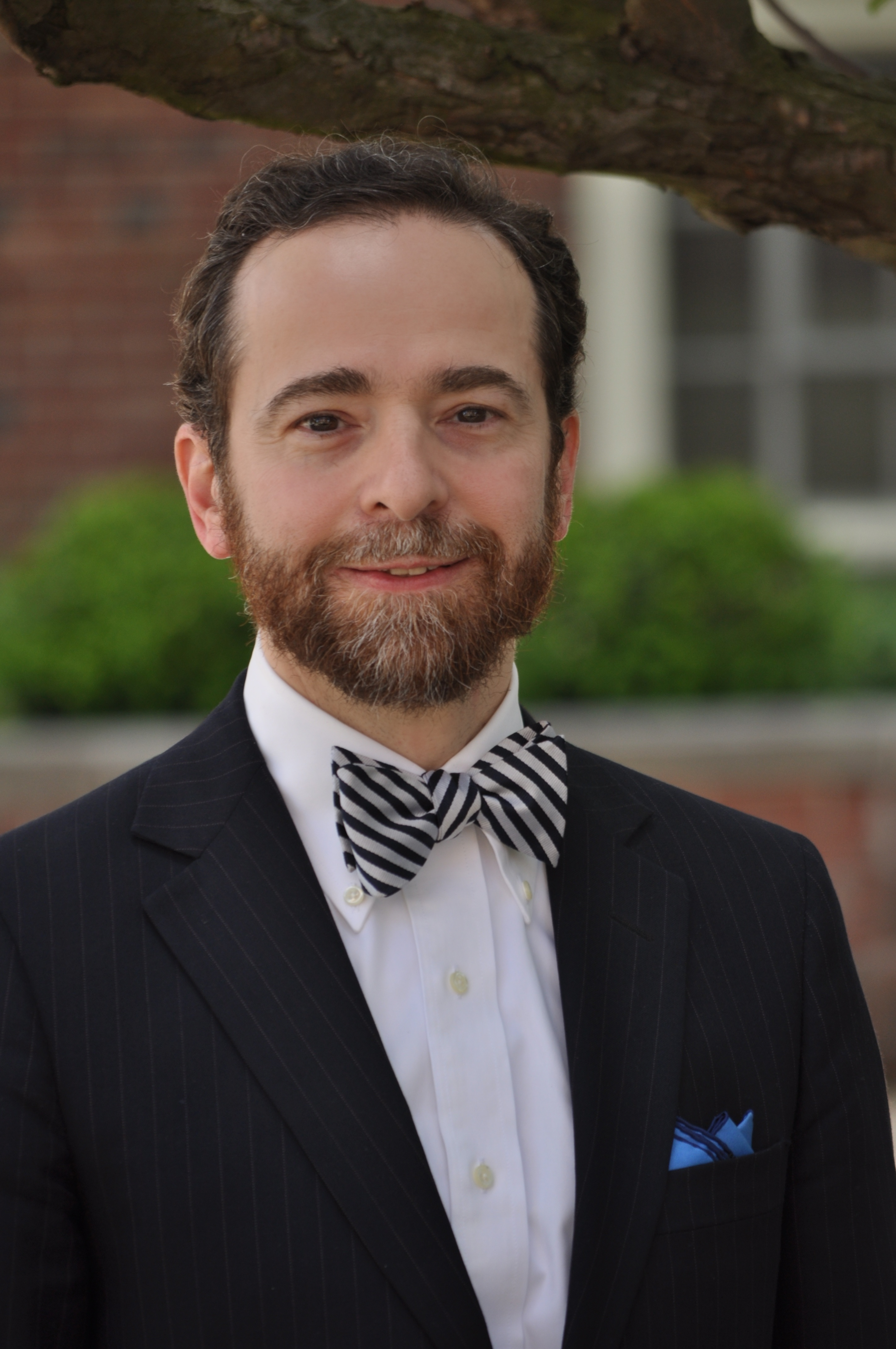
- Born: July 31, 1958 (age 68)
- Title: Associate Professor of New Testament, Pittsburgh Theological Seminary; Professor of New Testament Theology, Houston Christian University

Academic background
- Education: Dartmouth College, Harvard Divinity School, Princeton Theological Seminary (PhD)
- Thesis: Should we sin? The Romans debate and Romans 6:1-7:6 (1993)

Academic work
- Discipline: Biblical studies
- Sub-discipline: NT studies
- Institutions: Pittsburgh Theological Seminary, Houston Christian University
- Main interests: Pauline theology and sexuality
- Notable works: The Bible and Homosexual Practice: Texts and Hermeneutics (2001)
- Website: www.robgagnon.net

Robert A. J. Gagnon (born July 31, 1958) is an American theological writer, professor of New Testament Theology at Houston Baptist University (since 2018), former associate professor of the New Testament at the Pittsburgh Theological Seminary (1994–2017), and an elder in the Presbyterian Church (USA). He holds a BA from Dartmouth College, an Master of Theological Studies from Harvard Divinity School, and a PhD from the Princeton Theological Seminary.

Gagnon's primary fields are Pauline theology and sexuality. Gagnon has focused on the issue of The Bible and homosexuality. Shortly after the PCUSA declared it supports the ordination of women and affirms same-sex marriages and welcomes practicing LGBTQ people to serve in leadership positions as ministers, deacons, elders, and trustees, he resigned from the faculty of the PCUSA-affiliated Pittsburgh Theological Seminary. However, he "said the decision was mutual and that his departure had nothing to do with any 'moral turpitude.'"

Gagnon has been described by theologian James V. Brownson as "the foremost traditionalist interpreter" on this topic, and has published several books and articles about the subject. Gagnon's work on homosexuality is derived from Old and New Testament texts dealing with sexuality. Gagnon's arguments are based on reproductive biology and gender complementarity, in which Gagnon presents and interprets modern scholarship on the ancient texts. Gagnon's use of arguments based on "natural law" were targeted by liberal theologians like Jack Bartlett Rogers, who alleged Gagnon employed a "nonbiblical standard" in which "all people who are homosexual have willfully chosen that behavior and therefore can successfully change their sexual identity,". Gagnon responded this was an "outrageous misrepresentation" of his views. In the coauthored book Homosexuality and the Bible, Gagnon presents a conservative side of the debate on homosexuality and the church, while Dan O. Via, professor emeritus of New Testament at Duke Divinity School, presents an opposing view.

In his paper Why the 'Weak' at Rome Cannot Be Non-Christian Jews, Gagnon disputes work by Mark D. Nanos, who argues that Paul the Apostle was a Torah-observant follower of Judaism.

One of the authors of The Encyclopedia of Christian Civilization, New Dictionary of Christian Apologetics, Dictionary for Theological Interpretation of the Bible, and Oxford Handbook of Evangelical Theology.

== Works ==
=== Thesis ===
- Gagnon, Robert A. J. (1993). Should we sin? The Romans debate and Romans 6:1-7:6 (Ph.D.). Princeton Theological Seminary. OCLC 29423276.

=== Books ===
- ——— (2001). The Bible and Homosexual Practice: Texts and Hermeneutics. Nashville, TN: Abingdon Press. ISBN 978-0-687-08413-5. OCLC 45122623.
- ——— (2002). Are There Universally Valid Sex Precepts?: a critique of Walter Wink's views on the Bible and homosexuality. South Hamilton, MA: Goddard Library. OCLC 909918519.
- ———; Via, Dan Otto (2003). Homosexuality and the Bible: Two Views. Minneapolis, MN: Fortress Press. ISBN 978-0-800-63618-0. OCLC 53080113.

=== Articles and chapters ===
- ——— (January 2000). "Why the 'Weak' at Rome Cannot Be Non-Christian Jews". Catholic Biblical Quarterly. 62 (1): 64–82.
