= Village Presbyterian Church =

- Village Presbyterian Church
- 39.008°N 94.630°W
- Location: Prairie Village, Kansas
- Country: United States
- Denomination: Presbyterian Church (USA)
- Website: www.villagepres.org

History
- Founded: 1949
- Founder: Robert H. Meneilly

Village Presbyterian Church is a Presbyterian Church (USA) congregation founded on February 13, 1949, with 282 charter members, that has since grown to be one of the largest Presbyterian churches in America with a reported 4,789 members in 2013.

== History ==
Village Presbyterian Church was founded in February 1949 by Robert H. Meneilly. in Prairie Village, Kansas Meneilly went door-to-door in the emerging suburb to encourage residents to visit, and begin building a congregation before the building was complete. The church had its first service on Sunday, Feb. 13, 1949.

In a report from Walter Cronkite which was previewed in a 1994 article in the Washington Post, Cronkite described Village Presbyterian as an “absolute perfect example of what is happening to churches all over the United States today in the split between the evangelical right and the more mainstream.”

Rodger Nishioka became senior pastor in 2023.

== Village on Antioch ==
On February 5, 2017, Village Church became one church worshiping at two campuses, holding the first worship service at their first satellite campus located at 148th Street and Antioch Road in Overland Park, Kansas.

== Building ==
Village Presbyterian began reconstruction of the main church space in April 2015. The renovation was completed in December, 2015 and a new organ arrived in September 2016.
