= Pittsburgh Theological Seminary =

Presbyterian seminary in Pennsylvania

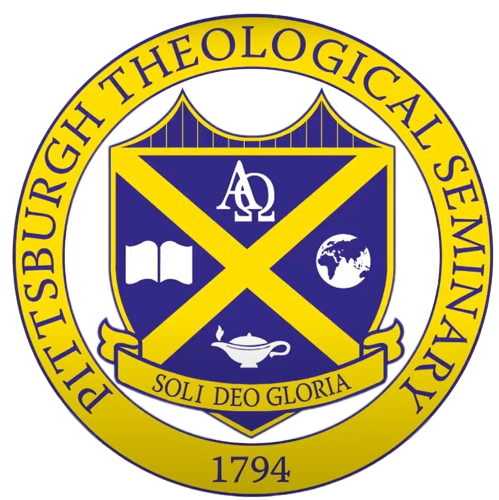
- Motto: Soli Deo Gloria
- Motto in English: Glory to God Alone
- Type: Seminary
- Established: 1794; 232 years ago
- Accreditation: Association of Theological Schools in the United States and Canada and the Middle States Commission on Higher Education
- Religious affiliation: Presbyterian Church (USA)
- President: Asa J. Lee
- Students: 240
- Location: Pittsburgh, Pennsylvania, United States; 40.46667°N 79.92167°W
- Campus: Urban
- Colors: Purple and Old Gold
- Website: www.pts.edu

Pittsburgh Theological Seminary (PTS) is a Presbyterian graduate seminary in Pittsburgh, Pennsylvania. Founded in 1794, it houses one of the largest theological libraries in the tri-state area.

== History ==
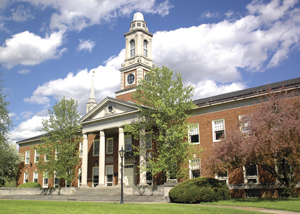

Pittsburgh Theological Seminary was formed in 1959 by consolidating the Presbyterian Church in the U.S.A.'s Western Theological Seminary and the United Presbyterian Church of North America's Pittsburgh-Xenia Theological Seminary. The consolidation was the result of the 1958 merger between the PCUSA and the UPCNA to form the United Presbyterian Church in the United States of America.

Pittsburgh-Xenia Theological Seminary began with the founding of Service Seminary (Associate Theological Seminary in the town of Service, Beaver County, Pennsylvania) in 1792 by the Associate Presbytery of Pennsylvania. Prior to that time, the Presbytery was dependent on a supply of ministers sent from Scotland. John Anderson was elected as the first teacher of divinity and the school began with an enrollment of six students. Service Seminary moved several times, from Service to Canonsburg, Pennsylvania, then to Xenia, Ohio, where it became Xenia Theological Seminary. This occurred in the 1850s and was prompted by a desire to locate nearer to the growing population in the Midwest. Joseph Kyle joined the faculty in 1900 (leaving 4th United Presbyterian Church in Allegheny, Pennsylvania). In approximately 1914, Kyle was appointed president. In 1920, the trustees determined to move the seminary to St. Louis, Missouri, also to be nearer to potential students in the Plains states. In 1921, Kyle died unexpectedly. This loss of leadership at a crucial transition period created problems for the fledgling institution and it never really took root. In 1930, Xenia merged with a seminary that was founded in Pittsburgh in 1825, which was known as Pittsburgh Seminary (1825–1833; 1913–1930) and Allegheny Seminary (1833–1912). Together Pittsburgh and Xenia formed the Pittsburgh-Xenia Theological Seminary. This institution was later augmented by the resources of Newburgh Seminary, founded in New York City in 1805 by John Mitchell Mason.

Western Theological Seminary, the other branch of Pittsburgh Theological Seminary's pre-1959 history, began with the establishment of classical academies in Washington, Pennsylvania, the first in 1785 by Joseph Smith and another in 1787 by John McMillan. Out of these academies, the General Assembly of the Presbyterian Church USA created Western Seminary. It was indeed a western seminary in 1825, furnishing a ministry for the rapidly opening frontier territories along the Ohio River.

Since the 1959 consolidation, Pittsburgh Theological Seminary has been located on the former Pittsburgh-Xenia Seminary campus in the Highland Park/East Liberty section of Pittsburgh. It became a PC (USA) seminary following the 1983 merger between the UPCUSA and the Presbyterian Church in the United States.

== Academics ==
Pittsburgh Theological Seminary is accredited by the Association of Theological Schools in the United States and Canada and the Middle States Commission on Higher Education. The seminary has scholars in all major fields of theological inquiry and offers language training in Greek and Hebrew. The following degrees are offered by the institution:

- Master of Divinity (M.Div.)
- Master of Arts in Pastoral Studies (M.A.P.S.)
- Master of Theological Studies (MTS)
- Doctor of Ministry (D.Min.) Focus areas include Science and Theology, Missional Leadership, Reformed, Christian Spirituality, Intergenerational Black Church Studies, Eastern Christian, and Creative Writing & Public Theology.

The Seminary also cooperates with other institutions within the Pittsburgh Council on Higher Education to offer joint degree programs, including:

- Master of Divinity/Juris Doctor (Duquesne University)
- M.A.P.S./Juris Doctor (Duquesne University)
- MTS/Juris Doctor (Duquesne University)
- Master of Divinity/Master of Social Work (University of Pittsburgh)

== Clifford E. Barbour Library ==
The Clifford E. Barbour Library is a theological library in Western Pennsylvania. Its 300,000 volumes, several online databases, and more than 800 periodical subscriptions make it one of the larger stand-alone theological libraries in the United States. The library is located in a three-story building of American Colonial design, dedicated in 1964. The library houses several valuable collections, including the John M. Mason Memorial Collection, which consists of many rare theological works dating from the Reformation. On display in the Hansen Reading Room are the desk and chair of Karl Barth, dedicated to Pittsburgh Theological Seminary by Barth's son, Markus Barth, a faculty member from 1963–1972. Many of the books and periodicals in the collection were made possible by a $15 million gift from wealthy banker and businessman Thomas Clinton. The library was managed by Dikran Hadidian during its formative years.

== Kelso Museum of Near Eastern Archaeology ==
Pittsburgh Theological Seminary is home to the Kelso Museum of Near Eastern Archaeology. The museum contains a collection of ancient Near Eastern and Palestinian pottery and artifacts brought together by travelers and archeologists over the past 60 years. Many exhibits resulted from the eight excavations of which the seminary has been a part.

The Seminary is very involved in Biblical archaeology, and sponsors the Zeitah Excavations in Israel at Tel Zayit. The excavation was founded under the direction of Professor Ron E. Tappy, Professor of Bible and Archaeology and director of Pittsburgh Theological Seminary's Kelso Museum of Near Eastern Archaeology. The excavation began in 1999 with a 55-member international team of experts and volunteers. In July 2005 excavators discovered the Zayit Stone, which contained an inscription dating to the 10th century BCE (King Solomon's reign). The two-line inscription, on a 33-pound limestone boulder embedded in the stone wall of a building, is the earliest securely-dated example of the complete Hebrew alphabet (an "abecedary"). The letters show a transitional script emerging from Phoenician and leading to the Hebrew national script of the 9th century BCE. The first significant inscription from this period in nearly a century, the discovery was reported in the New York Times.

== World Mission Initiative ==
World Mission Initiative (WMI) at Pittsburgh Theological Seminary is a fellowship of Presbyterians.

WMI prepares seminarians to become pastors, and coordinates cross-cultural trips. It has a church focus and works to train world Christian pastors. WMI hosts missionaries, national church leaders, and scholars on campus throughout the year.

== Faculty and alumni ==
Prominent faculty from the seminary's history include:

- Dale Allison
- M. Craig Barnes
- Robert A. J. Gagnon
- John Gerstner
- Archibald Alexander Hodge
- William Swan Plumer
- Andrew Purves
- Marjorie Hewitt Suchocki
- Benjamin Breckinridge Warfield
- Robert Dick Wilson

Prominent alumni include:

- Thomas K. Chadwick
- John A. Dalles
- Festo Kivengere, sometimes referred to as "the Billy Graham of Africa", a Ugandan Anglican Bishop of Kigezi, evangelist, and fierce critic of Idi Amin's excesses.
- Charles William Kerr, first permanent Protestant Christian minister of Tulsa, Oklahoma.
- Isaac C. Ketler, founder of Grove City College
- Calvin Wilson Mateer, the chairman of the committee for Bible translation of The Chinese Union Version.
- Robert H. Meneilly
- Fred Rogers
- MacHenry Schafer
- R. C. Sproul
- Lee Anna Starr (1893, first woman graduate of Allegheny Theological Seminary)
- Neil M. Stevenson
- Ralph Watkins
