= Thomas Clinton (businessman) =

American businessman

Thomas "Tom" Clinton (June 1, 1918 – August 8, 1981) was a businessman and religious leader instrumental in the formation of the Presbyterian Church (U.S.A.).

== Early life ==
Clinton was born in Philadelphia, Pennsylvania, where his father James Clinton worked as an attorney. In 1924, when Clinton was six years old, his father joined the United States Foreign Service and the family moved frequently. Clinton's father was first posted in Paris until 1928, and Clinton learned to speak excellent French. Next, the family moved to Vienna, where it remained until 1931, and Clinton learned to speak German and experienced the German culture.

After Austria, the family moved to Germany, where Clinton witnessed firsthand the rise of Nazism. His father would stay in Berlin until 1936, but in 1932 Thomas returned to the United States, where he attended high school at the Phillips Exeter Academy, graduating in 1936. Clinton then enrolled at Princeton University, where he studied languages and political science. He graduated in 1940, and entered the University of Pennsylvania Law School.

== World War II ==
After Pearl Harbor, Clinton a determined patriot decided to join the military to serve his country. He completed the fall semester at Penn, then dropped out to complete training to become an officer in the Army. He was commissioned in August 1942, and due to his excellent language skills, was assigned to intelligence work, initially in Washington, DC. Then, in 1944, he was sent to London to join the staff of General Dwight Eisenhower, remaining in London in various administrative and intelligence positions until the end of the war.

== Early business career ==
After the war, Clinton remained in London for a year, studying business and economics at the London School of Economics, though he did not receive a degree. In March 1946, he took a job with Barclays Bank, working at its London headquarters until 1948.

In 1948, Clinton moved to Cuba, where he worked in the import-export business, rapidly becoming quite wealthy. In 1956, Clinton left Cuba and returned to his native Philadelphia, where along with his associate Mark Craig, he established the import-export firm Clinton, Craig, and Associates, focusing on agricultural products. Clinton also became active in business and political circles, and was appointed to the Board of the Federal Reserve Bank of Philadelphia in 1959 and the Board of the Philadelphia Stock Exchange in 1961.

== Later business career ==
In 1963, Clinton sold his share in Clinton, Craig and Associates to Craig and three of the firm's associates, and moved to Frankfurt, Germany to become an executive of Deutsche Bank. In 1966, he was chosen to lead the bank's operations in the United Kingdom. While at Deutsche Bank, Clinton, as a former military intelligence officer, was suspected of involvement with the CIA. In 1970, after an unexplained absence from work of three weeks, he was asked to resign, and decided to retire.

== Retirement ==
After his years in banking and trade, Clinton had become extremely wealthy, and he retired to a large estate outside Pittsburgh. In retirement, Clinton became an important lay leader in the United Presbyterian Church in the United States of America. In 1974, he donated $15 million to the Pittsburgh Theological Seminary for its library, helping it to establish one of the largest theological libraries in the country.

Clinton also became a major advocate of the merger of the United Presbyterian Church in the United States of America and the southern Presbyterian Church in the United States, and traveled frequently speaking with church leaders and members to promote unification. In 1977, he donated $5 million to the southern Columbia Theological Seminary on the condition that it be used "for the study of the unification of the Presbyterian church." His financial support and persistent advocacy helped to convince many in the North and South that a merger would benefit both churches.

Clinton died on August 8, 1981, leaving most of his remaining money to a variety of Presbyterian seminaries and universities. His dream of a unified Presbyterian church was realized less than two years after his death with the creation of the Presbyterian Church (U.S.A.) on June 10, 1983. In the ceremonies surrounding the merger, Clinton was frequently recognized as one of the fathers of the unified church.
