= Ralph Watkins =

American academic

Ralph Basui Watkins is the Peachtree Associate Professor of Evangelism and Church Growth at Columbia Theological Seminary, in Decatur, Georgia, United States. He also serves as the senior pastor of the historic Wheat Street Baptist Church in Atlanta, Georgia, United States.

He holds a PhD in sociology from the University of Pittsburgh, a DMin in parish focus from Pittsburgh Theological Seminary, an MA in religion from The University of Dubuque Theological Seminary, a BA in political science from California State University at Sacramento, and an AA from American River Junior College. He has served a variety of academic and administrative roles, and has written many publications. His work and research is centered on building 21st century churches; he is working on ways churches can use multi-media approaches and web 2.0 strategies to be effective at evangelism and discipleship. He is also the host of Religion Roundtable for Atlanta Interfaith Broadcasters (AIB).

Through his writings and his career, Watkins aims to discuss social issues and issues related to the faith community as a whole. He also seeks to answer how the church plays a large role in society and may hold the solution to many of these issues. His approach through evangelism promotes and encourages people of different faiths to come together and help each other. He went to Israel and Palestine with the group Interfaith Peace-Builders in the summer of 2013 to explore ways to accomplish this. Besides his many books he uses his position as host of Religious Roundtable for Atlanta Interfaith Broadcasters and his website to affect the Atlanta community. He also helps his local faith community, helping churches reach out to youth who live in urban areas. He works with Our House, Inc. and Cooper Middle School (Georgia) as a volunteer videographer and storyteller.

== Career ==
After earning his degrees Watkins entered the field of church work. Throughout his career he has held a variety of positions at these churches:

- an associate pastor at Emmanuel African Methodist Episcopal Church in Sacramento, California
- a senior pastor at Ebenezer African Methodist Episcopal Church in Aliquippa, Pennsylvania
- a senior pastor at Trinity African Methodist Episcopal Church in Pittsburgh, Pennsylvania
- pastor of education and evangelism, Macedonia Baptist Church in Pittsburgh, Pennsylvania
- director of ministry development at Beulah Grove Baptist Church in Augusta, Georgia
- executive pastor and director of Ecclesia at the City of Refuge Church, Gardena in California
- executive pastor at African Methodist Episcopal Church in Los Angeles, California
- minister to young adults at First African Methodist Episcopal Church in Los Angeles, California
- pastor at Allen African Methodist Episcopal Church in Clearfield, Pennsylvania

Watkins has held many different positions at academic institutions. He was the director of minority students affairs at both University of Dubuque and Clarion University of Pennsylvania. While at Clarion University of Pennsylvania he was also the assistant to the president for social equity. He also spent a brief time as adjunct faculty at Community College of Allegheny County. At the University of Pittsburgh he became a teaching fellow and also in Pittsburgh at Pittsburgh Theological Seminary he became the assistant director of the Black Church Program. For one summer he was the scholar in residence at Penn State University and then became the associate professor in the department of sociology at Augusta State University. During this time he was also a visiting faculty at Fuller Theological Seminary for a summer. He then held the position of associate professor of society, religion, and Africana Studies at Fuller Theological Seminary.

He is an affiliate associate professor of society, religion and Africana studies at Fuller Theological Seminary and the associate professor of evangelism and church growth at Columbia Theological Seminary

== Awards ==
- Five Faculty Research and Development Grants from Augusta State University (1998–2002)
- Most Valuable Faculty, Student Ambassador Board from Augusta State University (1999–2000)
- Lilly Teaching Fellowship: Mining the African American Motherlode (1999–2000)
- The Wabash Teaching Fellowship for Mining the African American Motherlode – Book Project (2001–2003)
- Chancellor's Award from the University System of Georgia (2001–2002)
- Governor's Teaching Fellowship from the University System of Georgia (2000–2001)
- Fulbright Hayes Fellowship for Ghana Study and Research Seminar (2003)
- Study Grant: Egypt Study and Research from Fuller Theological Seminary (2008)
- Study Grant: Egypt Study and Research from Columbia Theological Seminary (2012)
