= Tel Zayit =

Archaeological tell in Israel

- תל זית (Hebrew)
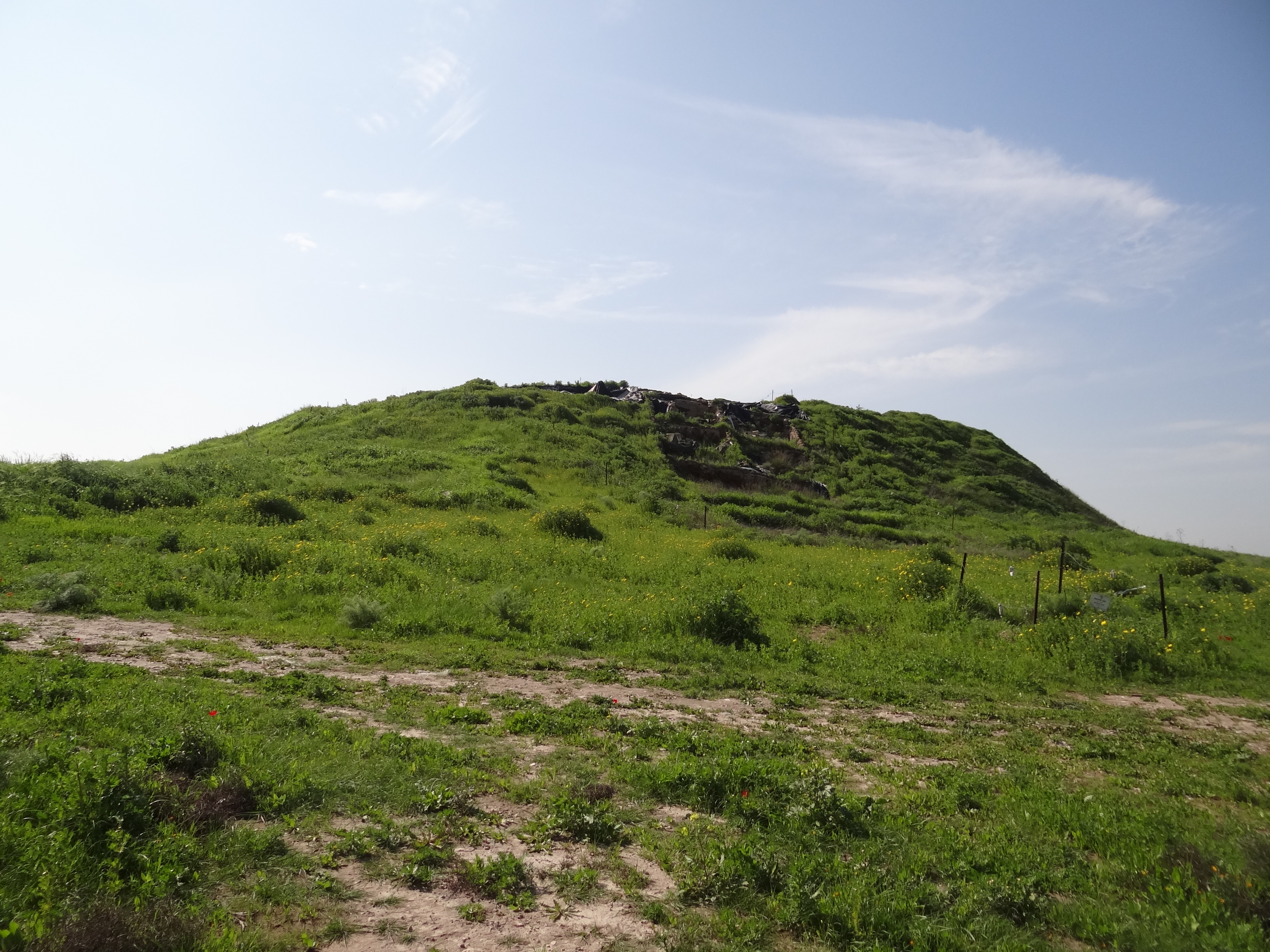
- Tel Zayit

- Location within Israel
- 31°37′45″N 34°49′49″E
- Type: Tell
- Periods: Late Bronze Age, Iron Age
- Cultures: Canaanite, Israelite
- Location: Gal'on, Israel
- Region: Shfela

Tel Zayit (Hebrew: תל זית, Arabic: زيْتا, Kirbat Zaytā al Kharab) is an archaeological tell in the Shephelah, or lowlands, of Israel, about 30 km east of Ashkelon.

The site had previously been known as the Arab village of Zayta; its population was moved 1.5 km north during the period of Mandatory Palestine, and depopulated by Israel’s Givati Brigade in 1948.

== History ==
The site, roughly 0.8-acre (0.32 ha), shows evidence of human settlement throughout the Late Bronze Age, and Iron Age I and II. The city was destroyed by fire twice, in 1200 BCE and the ninth century BCE. Hazael of Aram may have been the military leader who ordered the destruction of the city in the ninth century BCE. The Arameans' siege tactics are known from the Zakkur stele, which records that Hazael's son, called Ben-Hadad, employed spectacular siege warfare against his enemies. The Hebrew Bible records that Hazael devastated cities in the Shephelah during the ninth century BCE, including the Philistine city of Gath. The similar siege and destruction in 9th century BCE of Tell es-Safi, a nearby site usually identified as Gath, has been cited by archaeologists as possible evidence of Hazael's campaign.

Work at Tel Zayit began with a preliminary survey in 1998 by a Pittsburgh Theological Seminary team led by Ron Tappy.

During the 2005 season, archaeologists discovered the Zayit Stone among the ruins of a fire dating to the tenth century BC. Alternatively, a 9th-century BC date has been suggested. The stone includes an inscription identified by some scholars as an abecedary, among the oldest ever discovered.

== See also ==
- Archaeology of Israel
- Biblical archaeology
- Cities of the ancient Near East
- Tel Burna
- Zakkur
- Zayit Stone
