= Arieh O'Sullivan =

Israeli-American author, soldier, and defense correspondent (born 1961)

- אריה אוסליבן
- Born: March 22, 1961 (age 65)
- Occupations: Journalist, author, soldier
- Notable credit(s): The Media Line (Mideast Bureau Chief; 2009-2012); The Jerusalem Post (Defense Correspondent; 1996-2006); Associated Press (Foreign Correspondent; 1989-96)

Arieh O'Sullivan (Hebrew: אריה אוסליבן; born March 22, 1961) is an author, journalist, soldier, and defense correspondent who has covered Israel and the Middle East for over two decades.

He currently serves as an anchor and reporter at Israel Public Radio's English News. O'Sullivan was raised in Louisiana and Mississippi and moved to Israel in 1981.

He served as a paratrooper in the 1982 Lebanon War and was discharged in 2008 from the reserves. He earned a BA in mass communications from the University of Minnesota.

== Early years ==
Raised in New Orleans, Louisiana, O'Sullivan's father Fred (later Efraim) O'Sullivan was a Jewish convert from Catholicism.

== Media career ==
Before joining The Jerusalem Post, O'Sullivan worked for seven years as a correspondent for The Associated Press based in Jerusalem and covered the peace processes, the Gulf War in 1991, Palestinian unrest, the Rabin assassination, immigration from Ethiopia, as well as the civil war in Rwanda. He was a Knight Journalism fellow at Stanford University in 2002–03. He was a Hoover Media Fellow at Stanford University in 2012.

O'Sullivan served as director of communications for the Anti-Defamation League's Israel office from 2006 to 2008. He was the bureau chief of The Media Line, a non-profit American news agency covering the Middle East August 2009-July 2012. He is best known for his former role as a defense correspondent and analyst for The Jerusalem Post, the Middle East's leading English-language daily, where he worked for over 10 years. He appears as a guest commentator on a variety of world radio and television news programs and has reported from the Rwanda, the Palestinian territories, Kosovo, Northern Ireland, Lebanon, Turkey, and China.

== Srigim ==
O'Sullivan is a founding member of the ecological village of Srigim in the Elah Valley in central Israel. He currently lives in an Ottoman-era castle in Agur.
