= Hellenistic Palestine =

History of Palestine from the time of Alexander the Great until the Romans

- 332 BCE – 63 BCE
Achaemenid empire	Roman Palestine
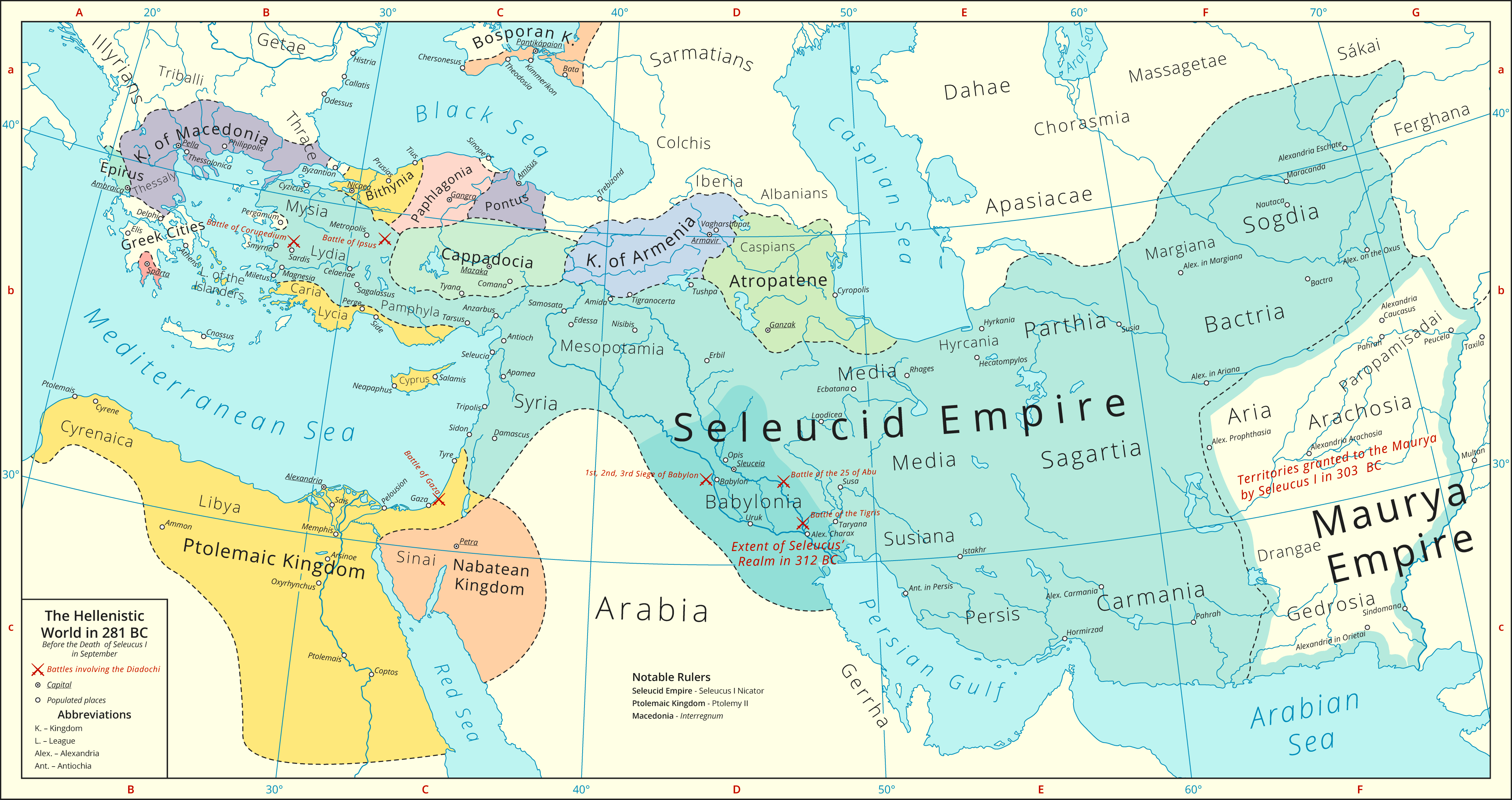
- Duration: c. 4 centuries
- Location: Southern Levant
- Including: Ptolemaic dynasty; Seleucid dynasty; Hasmonean dynasty
- Key events: Greek conquest of Persia; Syrian Wars (274-168 BCE); Maccabean Revolt (141 BCE)

Hellenistic Palestine is a term used to discuss the history of the region of Palestine during its Hellenistic period from 333 BCE to 63 BCE, when Achaemenid Syria was conquered by Alexander the Great and subsumed into his growing Macedonian empire. It includes the history of Hellenistic Judea, which may have still been a province among others, as well as what some scholars refer to as the Land of Israel (Judea, Samaria and the Galilee) though the written material on the provincial organization for this period is scant. Numismatic evidence shows that there were several important poleis that served as important centers under Achaemenid rule and retained minting rights under Hellenistic rule. These include the coastal centers of Ascalon, Gaza, and Ptolemais, as well as to a lesser degree, Demetrius-by-the-sea (possibly the same as Strato's Tower), and for very local use and distribution Jerusalem, and Samaria.

After his death in 323 BCE, Alexander's empire was divided among his generals, the Diadochi, marking the beginning of Macedonian rule over various territories, including Coele-Syria, Phoenicia, and Palestine. This initial period saw numerous conflicts as former generals vied for control, leading to ongoing power struggles and territorial exchanges. Ptolemaic rule began with Ptolemy I Soter taking control of Egypt in 322 BCE and consolidating control over Palestine by 301 BCE due to its strategic significance.

Ptolemaic rule brought initial stability and economic prosperity to the region. Ptolemy I and his successor, Ptolemy II Philadelphus brought the Ptolemaic dynasty to its zenith by winning the first and second Syrian Wars, and initiating several large-scale building projects, expanding and fortifying existing and new urban settlements. Despite these successes, ongoing conflicts with the Seleucids, particularly over the strategic region of Coele-Syria and the Palestinian coastal cities led to more Syrian Wars. The peace and stability enjoyed by the local population under Ptolemaic rule were disrupted by these wars, and the region's control fluctuated due to the military campaigns and political maneuvers.

Seleucid rule began in 198 BCE under Antiochus III the Great, who, like the Ptolemies, allowed the Jews to retain their customs and religion. However, financial strains due to obligations to Rome led to unpopular measures, such as temple robberies, which ultimately resulted in Antiochus III's death in 187 BCE. His successors faced internal and external conflicts that sowed dissatisfaction among the local population. The Maccabean Revolt, led by Judas Maccabeus, highlighted the growing unrest and resistance against Seleucid authority, eventually leading to significant shifts in power dynamics within the region.

The Hasmonean dynasty emerged from the Maccabean Revolt, with Simon Thassi becoming high priest and ruler, establishing an independent Judea. His successors, notably John Hyrcanus, greatly expanded the territory controlled by the kingdom by military conquest in Seleucid held areas, while maintaining diplomatic relations with Rome and the Ptolemies. However, internal strife and external pressures from the Seleucids and later the Romans, led to the decline of the Hasmonean dynasty. The intervention of the Roman general Pompey in the 63 BCE Siege of Jerusalem, marked the end of independent Hasmonean rule. The region was annexed by the Roman Republic, marking the end of the Hellenistic period in Palestine, and the beginning of Roman rule of Palestine, which brought Roman Judea under its rule. The dynasty's official end came in 40 BCE when Herod the Great was crowned as a client king of Judea by the Romans, solidifying Roman control over the region.

== Macedonian rule ==
The beginning of the Hellenistic Period is marked by the conquest of Alexander the Great who defeated Persian forces led by Darius III in the Battle of Issus in 333 BCE (near present day Iskanderun, which bears his name). He led his forces on to besiege and conquer Tyre at the beginning of 332 BCE, ending that year with the siege and conquest of Gaza, following unsuccessful months long resistance by these two fortified cities. Gaza was largely destroyed, its people killed or captured, and rebuilt and resettled by people in its immediate environs willing to live under Alexander's rule. Curtius reports that Alexander also destroyed the city of Samaria and expelled its inhabitants after Samaritans lynched Andromachus, the governor of Syria there, and re-established the city as a Macedonian military colony.

When Alexander died in 323 without heirs his generals fought to divide the empire among themselves. Palestine and Phoenicia were especially coveted due to the geostrategic location, as well as the productive economic strength of their coastal cities and role of their ports in Mediterranean trade networks. Two of these generals, Ptolemy I Soter and Seleucus I Nicator, emerged as the founders of two eponymous dynastic empires, the Ptolemaic Empire and the Seleucid Empire, who would battle each other in the Syrian Wars for control over Palestine for most of the Hellenistic period.

== Ptolemaic rule ==
The Ptolemaic dynasty begins with Ptolemy I Soter taking control of Egypt in 322 BCE, though he was not officially crowned until 305 BCE. Seleucus I Nicator emerged the head of the satrapy of Babylon, consolidating control by 312 BCE after rival attempts to wrest it from him by Antigonus I Monophthalmus and his son, Demetrius I Poliorcetes. During this initial period marked by the Wars of the Diadochi, control over Palestine went back and forth between the Ptolemaic Kingdom and Seleucids, with Ptolemy consolidating his grip over it and southern and central Phoenicia as far north as Aradus by 301 BCE.

Not much is known about the happenings of those in Judea from the time of Alexander's death until the Battle of Ipsus in 301 BCE due to frequent battles centered largely on the strategic coastal plains, but the local population is generally assumed to have been content with Ptolemy's rule, which brought them peace and economic stability, allowing them to keep their religious practices, so long as they paid their taxes and did not rebel. By contrast, cities on the Palestinian coast vital to trade, particularly Gaza and Jaffa (Ioppe), suffered serious continuing instability and destruction in the wake of ongoing battles.

It is known that Idumea emerged as an administrative unit early on in the Hellenistic period. It is referred to as an eparchia by Diodorus in his recounting of Antigonus' campaign in the region following the defeat of his forces at the Old City of Gaza by the then allied forces of Ptolemy and Seleucus in 312 BCE.

After Ptolemy I came Ptolemy II Philadelphus, who brought the dynasty to the peak of its power. He was victorious in the first two Syrian Wars, but after attempting to end the conflict with the Seleucids by arranging a marriage between his daughter Berenice II and the Seleucid king Antiochus II, he died. The marriage did not work, and Berenice, Antiochus, and their child were executed by order of Antiochus' former wife. This was one of the reasons for the third Syrian War.

Ptolemy undertook many large construction works in Palestine, tripling the size of the Old City of Acre and building new walls and fortifications, the bases of which still encircle the city today He renamed it Ptolemais. Acre was the administrative capital of Palestine in this period, minting its own coins in 261 BCE. Further work was done to the walls of Dor and Gaza, as they were damaged in the wars of the Diadochi. Ptolemy II also founded three new cities inland at strategic locations, some on already existing sites, given the region's long history of habitation. One was named Philoteria, after his sister Philotera II and located at the southern end of the Sea of Galilee between two streams, making it an island-like settlement surrounded by natural moats. Also constructed, fortified and renamed by Ptolemy II were Scythopolis (Beisan) to the south of Philoteria and Philadelphia, which sat on the King's Highway.

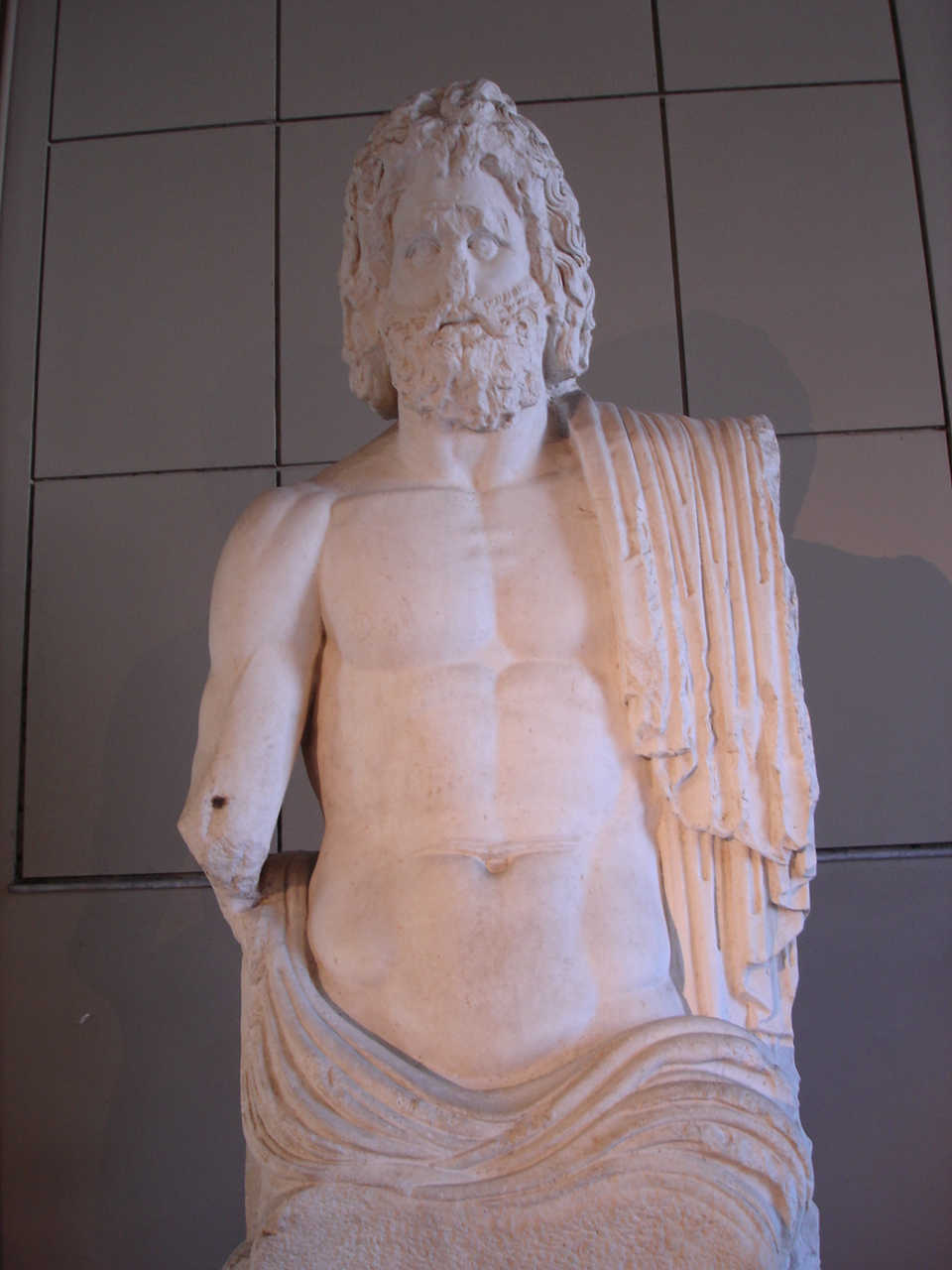
Statue of Dagon/Marnas portrayed in the style of Zeus unearthed at Tell es-Sanam in Gaza

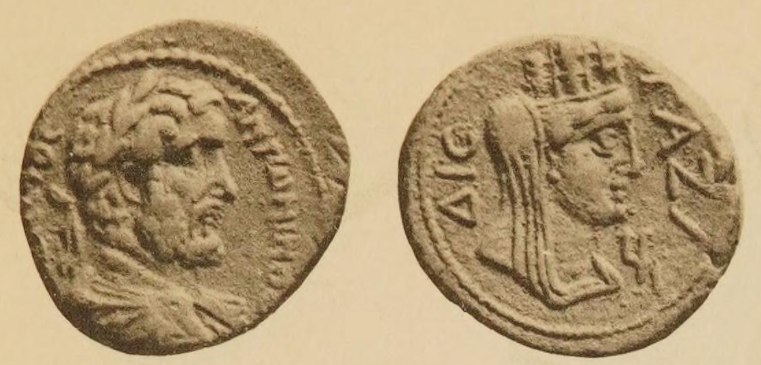
Hellenistic coin from the Gaza mint.

One of the rare sources for contemporary accounts of Syria Palestine at this time are the Zenon Papyri, which contains detailed records of imports from the region into Egypt, part of records kept on taxes imposed and collected by the Ptolemaic administration on trade and commercial activity, as well as accounts of the visit of a Ptolemaic official named Zenon to the region between 258 and 259 BCE. Among the places mentioned in the letters were the cities of Gaza, Afek, Acre, Kadesh, and Tyre. Among the goods shipped through the ports of Gaza and Ptolemais/Acre, where new customs houses had been established, were wine, honey, wool, sponges, and nuts.

The Zenon Papyri also shed some light on Ptolemaic relations with the Nabataeans, whose kingdom to the south, east, and northeast, was on the rise at this time due to their control of the major trade routes crossing the region, as well as their own trade in incense and bitumen from the Dead Sea (used in mummification practices). Nabataean traders would bring these much-prized goods to the port of Gaza, where the Ptolemaic customs house would export them onto Pelusium.

There was great linguistic diversity in Palestine during this period. Multilingualism was common, especially among the educated and merchant classes. Among the languages used for oral or written communications were Ancient North Arabian, Aramaic (several varieties), Biblical Hebrew, Koine Greek, Old Arabic, and Samaritan Hebrew.

Ptolemaic rule continued the practice of the former Persian empire of designating good farming land, "the King's Land", while also imposing a new taxation regime called tax farming. Bigger farmers collected the high taxes of the smaller farmers. These farmers made a lot of money from this, but it also created a rift between the aristocracy and everyone else. During the end of the Third Syrian War, Onias II, the High Priest in Jerusalem, would not pay the tax to the Ptolemy III Euergetes. It is thought that this shows a turning point in Judaean support of the Ptolemies.

The loss of Ptolemaic control to the Seleucids between 235 - 200 BCE

The Fourth and Fifth Syrian Wars marked the end of the Ptolemaic control of Palestine. The Battle of Raphia between the forces of Ptolemy IV Philopator and Antiochus III the Great of the Seleucid Empire was one of the largest battles in the ancient and Hellenistic worlds involving the use of war elephants. Both of these wars impacted Palestine more than the previous three. The combination of the ineffective Ptolemaic rulers (Ptolemy IV and his successor, Ptolemy V Epiphanes) and the might of the large Seleucid army ended the Ptolemaic dynasty's century-long rule over Palestine.

== Seleucid rule ==
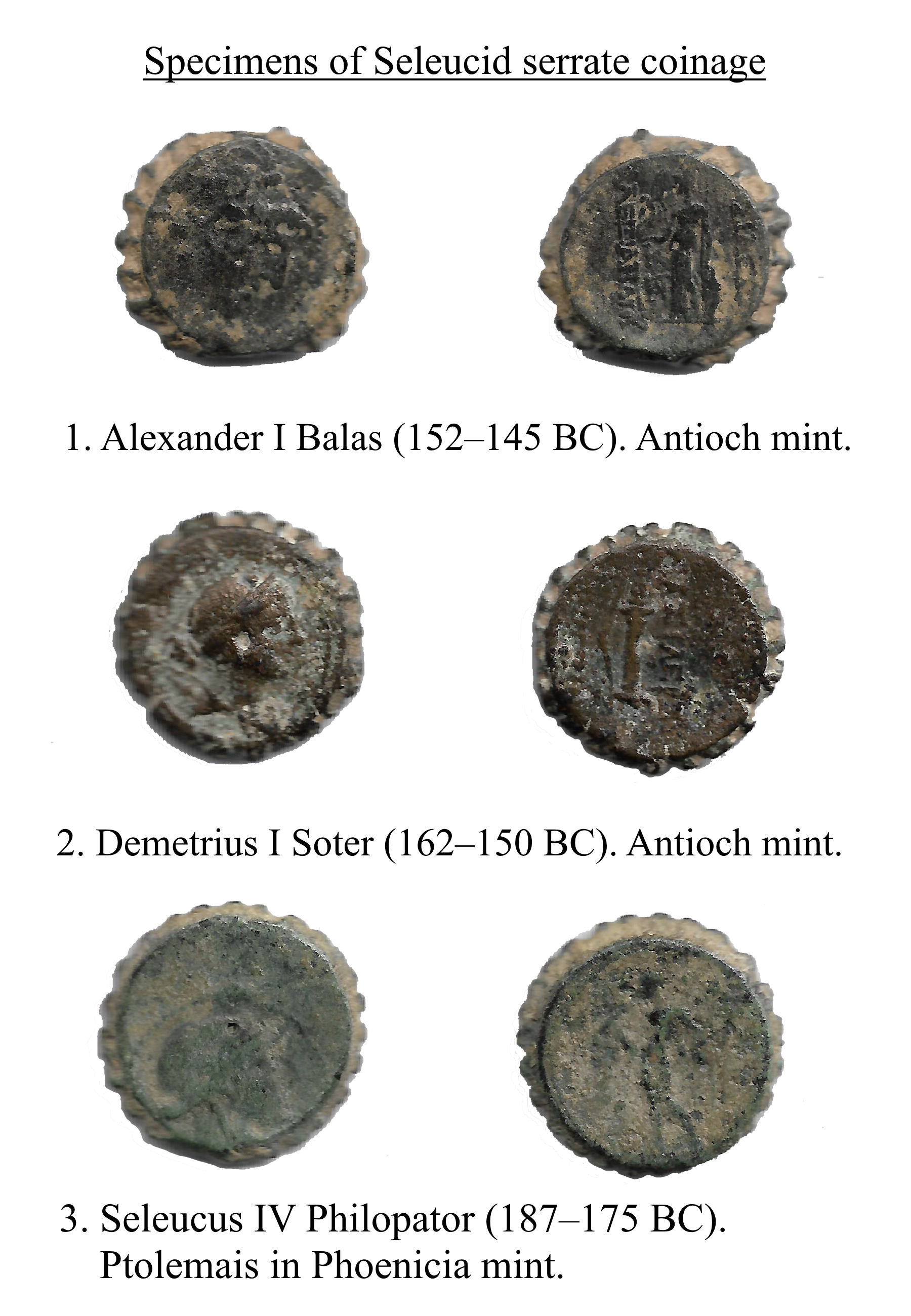
Coins used in the Seleucid Empire

Seleucid rule began in 198 BCE under Antiochus III. He, like the Ptolemies, let the Jews keep their religion and customs and even went so far as to encourage the rebuilding of the temple and city after they welcomed him so warmly into Jerusalem. However, Antiochus owed the Romans a great deal of money. In order to raise this money, he decided to rob a temple. The people at the temple of Bel in Elam were not pleased, so they killed Antiochus and everyone helping him in 187 BCE. He was succeeded by his son Seleucus IV Philopater. He simply defended the area from Ptolemy V before being murdered by his minister in 175. His brother Antiochus IV Epiphanes took his place. Before he killed the king, the minister Heliodorus had tried to steal the treasures from the temple in Jerusalem. He was informed of this by a rival of the current High Priest Onias III. Heliodorus was not allowed into the temple, but it required Onias to go explain to the king why one of his ministers was denied access somewhere. In his absence, his rivals put up a new high priest. Onias' brother Jason (a Hellenized version of Joshua) took his place.

Following the transition of to Seleucid rule, the balance of power between Ascalon and Gaza shifted. Gaza lost its status as the principal port for trade caravans arriving from the Arabian Peninsula. By 169/168 BCE, during the reign of Antiochus IV Epiphanes (r. 175 – 164 BCE), Ascalon was one of 19 cities across the empire granted minting rights. Historians have proposed several reasons for this policy, including efforts to enlist key cities in the empire's postwar reconstruction or purely financial motives. The coins minted in Ascalon constitute a key body of evidence for reconstructing the city's political history during the late Hellenistic period.

An autonomous coin minted in 168/167 BCE (Note: Year 145 in the Seleucid era) provides the only direct evidence that Ascalon held polis status by that time. The coin features a portrait of the Greek goddess Tyche on one side, and the bow of a warship with the inscriptions "of the Ascalonians" and "of the demos" on the other side. The exact timing of when cities received polis status remains debated among scholars. Some argue that such status was granted as early as the Ptolemaic rule. Gideon Fuks suggested that Seleucus IV Philopator (r. 187 – 175 BCE) conferred polis rights to various cities as part of a decentralization policy intended to strengthen local control over rural hinterlands. He further argued that cities such as Ascalon paid substantial sums for these rights, providing much-needed revenue to the Seleucid state in the aftermath of prolonged warfare.

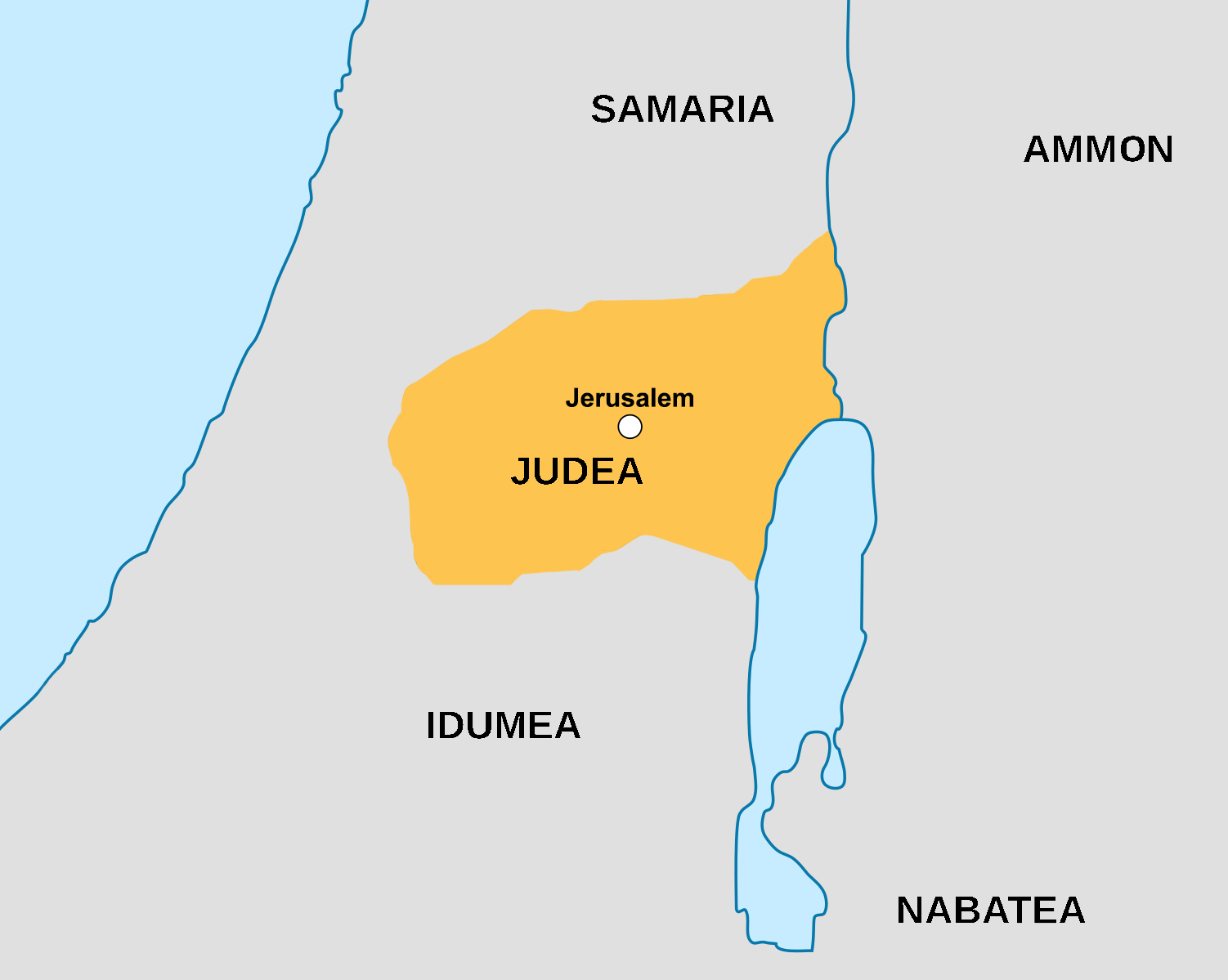
Judea at the time of the Maccabean revolt under Seleucid dynastic rule

Dissatisfaction with Seleucid rule in Judah led to the Maccabean Revolt, which was led by Judas Maccabeus. He proved to be a successful general, defeating an army led by Apollonius. They started to catch the attention of King Antiochus IV in 165, who told his chancellor to put an end to the revolt. The chancellor, Lysias, sent three generals to do just that, but they were all defeated by the Maccabees. Soon after, Lysias went himself but, according to 1 and 2 Maccabees he was defeated. There is evidence to show that it was not that simple and that there was negotiation, but Lysias still left. After the death of Antiochus IV in 164, his son, Antiochus V, gave the Jews religious freedom. Lysias claimed to be his regent. Around this time was the re-dedication of the temple. During the siege of the Acra, one of Judas' brothers, Eleazor, was killed. The Maccabees had to retreat back to Jerusalem, where they should have been beaten badly. However, Lysias had to pull out because of a contradiction of who was to be regent for Antiochus V. Shortly after, both were killed by Demetrius I Soter who became the new king. The new high priest, Alcimus, had come to Jerusalem with the company of an army led by Bacchides. Around this time Judas was able to make a treaty with the Romans. Soon after this, Judas was killed in Jerusalem fighting Bacchides' army. His brother Jonathan succeeded him. For eight years, Jonathan didn't do much. However, in 153 the Seleucid Empire started to face some problems. Jonathan used this chance to exchange his services of troops for Demetrius so that he could take back Jerusalem. He was appointed high priest by Alexander Balas for the same thing. When conflicts between Egypt and the Seleucids arose, Jonathan occupied the Acra. As conflicts over the throne arose, he completely took control of the Acra. But in 142 he was killed. His brother Simon took his place.

=== Independent Ascalon ===
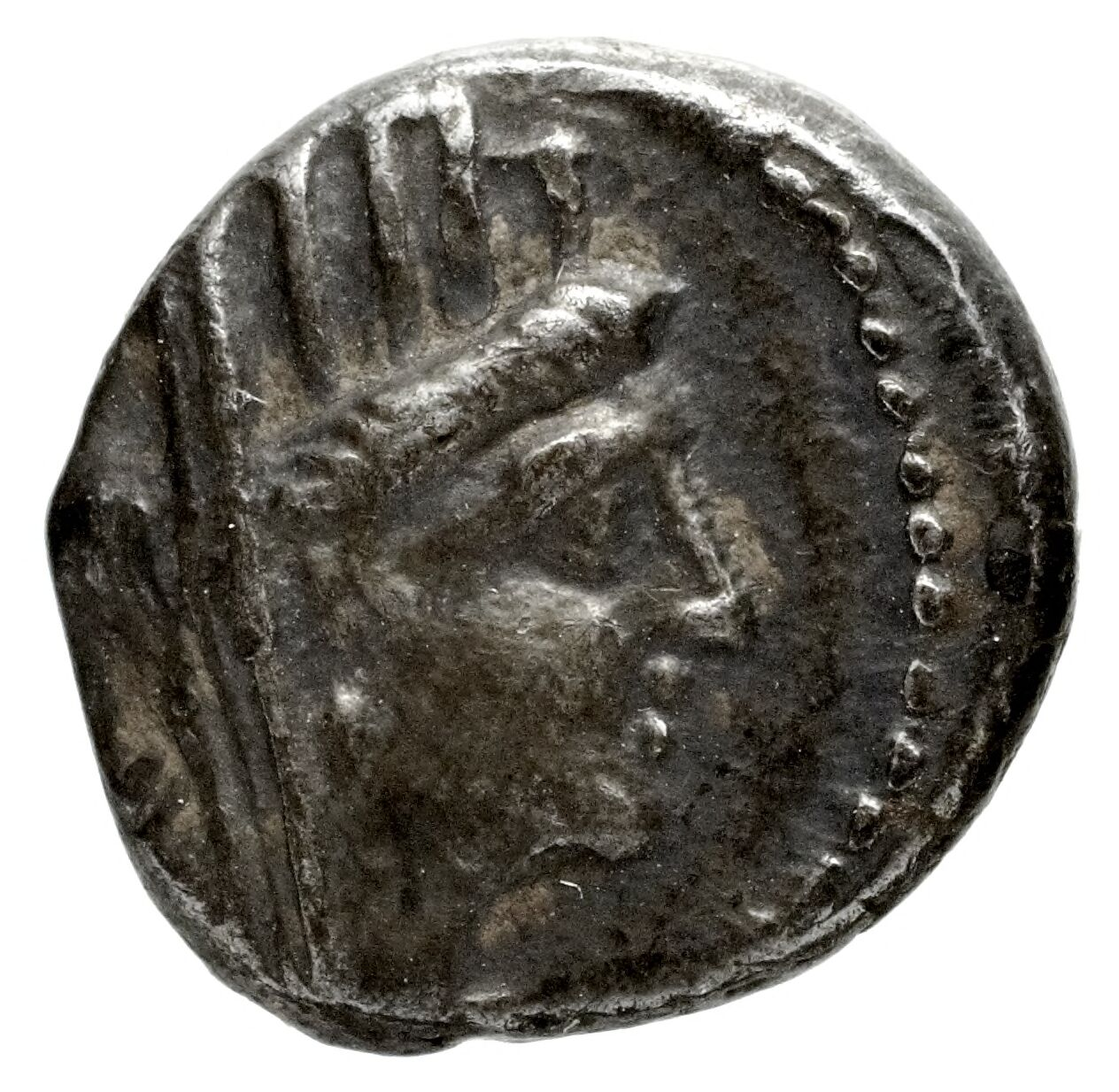
Silver coin, half a drachma, depicting the head of the goddess Tyche, minted at Ascalon, Palestine in 111-109 BC

When Diodotus Tryphon seized power in 142 BCE, the Ascalon mint began issuing coins bearing his portrait. Antiochus VII Sidetes later challenged Tryphon, becoming the sole ruler of the Seleucid Empire in 138 BCE. Often regarded as the last strong Seleucid monarch, Sidetes retained control over the Levantine coast, including Ascalon, while the Hasmoneans held Jaffa to the north.

Following Sidetes death in 129 BCE, the Seleucid Empire fell into renewed civil war. Around 126–123 BCE, Ascalon came under the control of Alexander II Zabinas, a usurper backed by Ptolemaic Kingdom to the south. His brief reign ended when the Ptolemaics shifted their support to his rival, Antiochus VIII Grypus, who defeated Zabinas in 123/122 BCE and took power. Grypus's mother Cleopatra Thea, acted as both queen consort and as the de facto ruler. Coins minted in Ascalon from this period depict both her and Gryphus until her death in 121 BCE, when she was attempting to assassinate of her son. From 120 and 114 BCE, Ascalon's coinage featured only Gryphus portrait.

In 114/113 BCE, Gryphus' half-brother, Antiochus IX Cyzicenus, launched a campaign to seize the throne. He captured most of the Selecuid territory, including Ascalon, which minted coins in his name for two years, until 112/111 BCE. Historians suggest that both the Ptolemaic Kingdom and Hasmonean dynasty may have aided Gryphus in the retaking of Ascalon. Around this time, the city was granted the status of a "holy" and "inviolable" city, likely exempting it from certain taxes and granting it partial of full autonomy, including immunity from legal enforcement actions, except in cases of offenses against the Seleucid king.

By 103 BCE Ascalon began using its own calendar, formally marking its independence. The city remained neutral during the 103–102 BCE conflict involving Hasmonean Alexander Jannaeus (r. 103 – 76 BCE), the exiled Ptolemy IX Soter (Lathyrus) who invaded from Cyprus, and the reigning Ptolemaic queen of Egypt, Cleopatra III. Ascalon is thought to have maintained amicable relations with both the Hasmoneans and Ptolemaic Egypt, a diplomatic stance that likely contributed to its continued autonomy. This is supported by the fact that, while Jannaeus conquered the southern coastal region and destroyed Gaza in 95/94 BCE, Ascalon remained untouched, making it the only independent Hellenistic coastal city south of Acre. It continued to maintain friendly relations with both powers for the next four decades until the conquest of Pompey.

=== Hasmonean rule ===
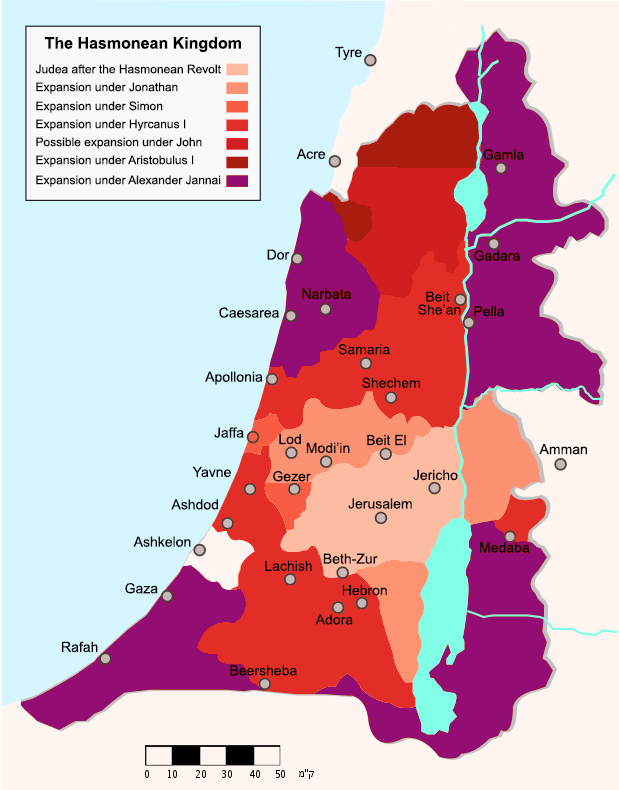
Expansion of the Hasmonean kingdom

Simon was nominated for the title of high priest, general, and leader by a "great assembly". He reached out to Rome to have them guarantee that Judea would be an independent land. Antiochus VII wanted the cities of Gadara, Joppa, and the Acra back. He also wanted a very large tribute. Simon only wanted to pay a fraction of that for only two of the cities, so Antiochus sent his general Cendebaeus to attack. The general was killed and the army fled. Simon and two of his sons were killed in a plot to overthrow the Hasmoneans. His last remaining son, John Hyrcanus, was supposed to be killed as well, but he was informed of the plan and rushed to Jerusalem to keep it safe. Hyrcanus had many issues to deal with as the new high priest. Antiochus invaded Judea and besieged Jerusalem in 134 BCE. Due to lack of food, Hyrcanus had to make a deal with Antiochus. He had to pay a large sum of money, tear down the walls of the city, acknowledge Seleucid power over Judea, and help the Seleucids fight against the Parthians. Hyrcanus agreed to this, but the war against the Parthians didn't work and Antiochus died in 128. Hyrcanus was able to take back Judea and keep his power.

John Hyrcanus also kept good relations with the Roman and the Egyptians, owing to the large number of Jews living there, and conquered Transjordan, Samaria, and Idumea (also known as Edom). This campaign of conquest is said by Josephus to have been carried out immediately following Antiochus' death though some archaeological evidence places it later (between 112 and 108 BCE). Idumeans were given a choice between conversion to Judaism, including obligatory circumcision, or exile. There is evidence that many Idumean localities, both urban and rural, (among them Tel Beersheba, Lachish, Tel Arad, Tel Ira, Khirbet el-Rasm, Khirbet Uza) were abandoned during this period as a result.

Aristobulus I was the first Hasmonean priest-king. He defied his father's wishes that his mother should take over the government and instead had her and all of his brothers except for one thrown in prison. The one not thrown in prison was later killed on his orders. The most significant thing he did during his one-year-reign was conquer most of Galilee. After his death, he was succeeded by his brother Alexander Jannaeus, who was only concerned with power and conquest. He also married his brother's widow, showing little respect for Jewish law. His first conquest was Ptolemais. The people called to Ptolemy IX for aid, as he was in Cyprus. However, it was his mother, Cleopatra III, who came to help Alexander and not her son. Alexander was not a popular ruler. This caused a civil war in Jerusalem that lasted for six years. After Alexander Jannaeus' death, his widow became ruler, but not high priest. The end of the Hasmonean Dynasty was in 63 when the Romans came at the request of the current priest-king Aristobulus II and his competitor Hyrcanus II. In 63 BCE the Roman general Pompey conquered Jerusalem and the Romans put Hyrcanus II up as high priest, but Judea became a client-kingdom of Rome. The dynasty came to an end in 40 BCE when Herod was crowned king of Judah by the Romans. With their help, Herod had seized Jerusalem by 37.

== See also ==
- Hellenistic Judaism
- Second Temple period
