= Khirbet er-Rasm =

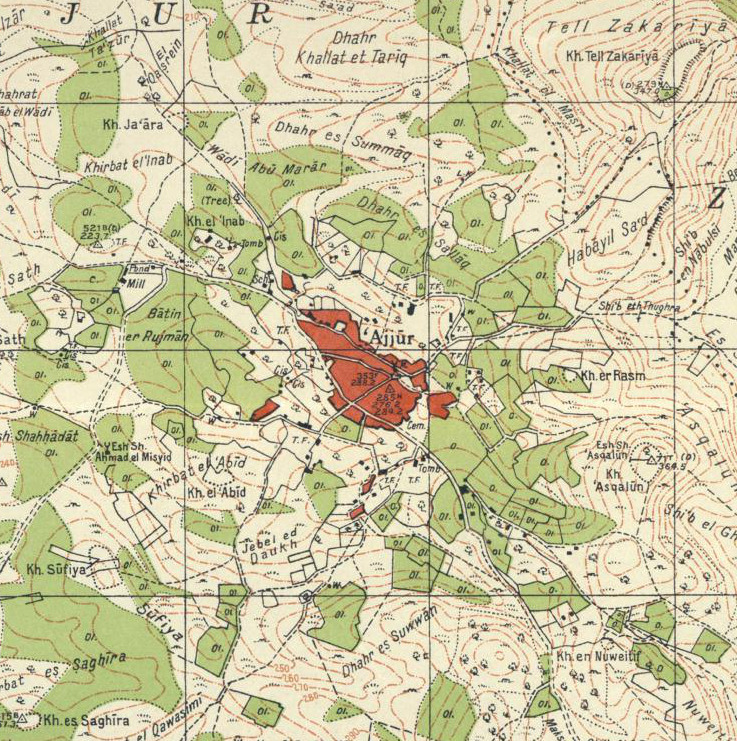
British survey map showing Khirbet el Rasm to the right of 'Ajjur

Khirbet er-Rasm is an archaeological site in the Judaean Lowlands of central Israel, located within the Jewish National Fund's Britain Park. Excavations conducted between 1997 and 2003 revealed intermittent occupation spanning from the Chalcolithic period to the late 2nd century BCE, after which the site was used primarily for agriculture and pastoralism. During the Hellenistic period, Khirbet er-Rasm was an Idumaean rural settlement that was destroyed and abandoned in the late 2nd century BC, seemingly by Hasmonean Judea.

== Name ==
It was called Khirbet er-Rasm (khirbet meaning "ruins" and rasm meaning "sketch") by the Palestinians who lived in its vicinity. The place's historical name and identity at the time it was a settled village still unknown.

== Geography ==
Khirbet er-Rasm is located about 1 kilometre (0.62 mi) southwest of Tel 'Azekah. The site was not connected to any of the main roads, and only accessible by walking paths, and has been described as a rural settlement.

== History ==
Excavations at Khirbet er-Rasm, conducted between 1997 and 2003 have revealed several layers of habitation from as early as Chalcolithic era to as late as the 2nd century BC, with the site being used largely by local farmers and herders thereafter.

=== Classical antiquity ===
Pottery finds at the site included a large repertoire of daily use vessels dated to the Hellenistic period, no later than the late 2nd century BC that had been left behind with some slightly older vessels. Complete assemblages of these vessels were uncovered which were smashed in the destruction the village was subject to allowing archaeologists to decipher the approximate end date of the village and its circumstances.

Archaeologists identify Khirbet el Rasm as one of several Idumaean sites that were depopulated in the military campaigns of conquest waged by Hasmonean Judea between 112 and 108 BC, along with Tel Beersheba, Lachish, Tel Arad, Tel Ira, and Khirbet Uza. The archaeological findings at Khirbet er-Rasm and other excavated rural sites provided material evidence that John Hyrcanus' campaign did not only affect the populations of urban sites he conquered, but also resulted in the depopulation of much of the Idumean countryside too, contrary to the arguments made by some scholars that they were spared because of their cultural similarity or affinity with the new rulers of expansionist Judea.

=== Modern period ===
Khirbet er-Rasm lay on the lands of the village of 'Ajjur which lay to the immediate west, and they cultivated olive trees at the site in the Ottoman period. They also built stone walls in linear formation over older ones to divide the agricultural land into plots, where they also cultivated annual crops, as well as citrus trees, which were likely watered using the ancient cisterns extant at the site. 'Ajjur was depopulated and destroyed in the 1948 Nakba and the moshav of Agur took over the use of the orchards thereafter. Khirbet er-Rasm disappeared from maps following the Hebraization of place names undertaken by the State of Israel.
