= Ben-Arie =

Ben-Arie, Ben-Arieh, Ben Arieh, or Ben-Aryeh (Hebrew: בן-אריה) can be a middle name or a surname. Notable people with the name include:

== Middle name ==
- Nirit Ben-Aryeh Debby, Israeli professor
- Zechariah Mendel ben Aryeh Leib, Polish Talmudist

== Surname ==
- Aarele Ben Arieh, Israeli sculptor
- Jacob Ben-Arie (born 1950), Israeli paralympic athlete
- Shavit Ben-Arie, official in the Israeli Ministry of Culture and Sport
- Yehoshua Ben-Arieh (1928–2023), Israeli geographer
