= 'Ajjur =

'Ajjur عجّور 'Ajur
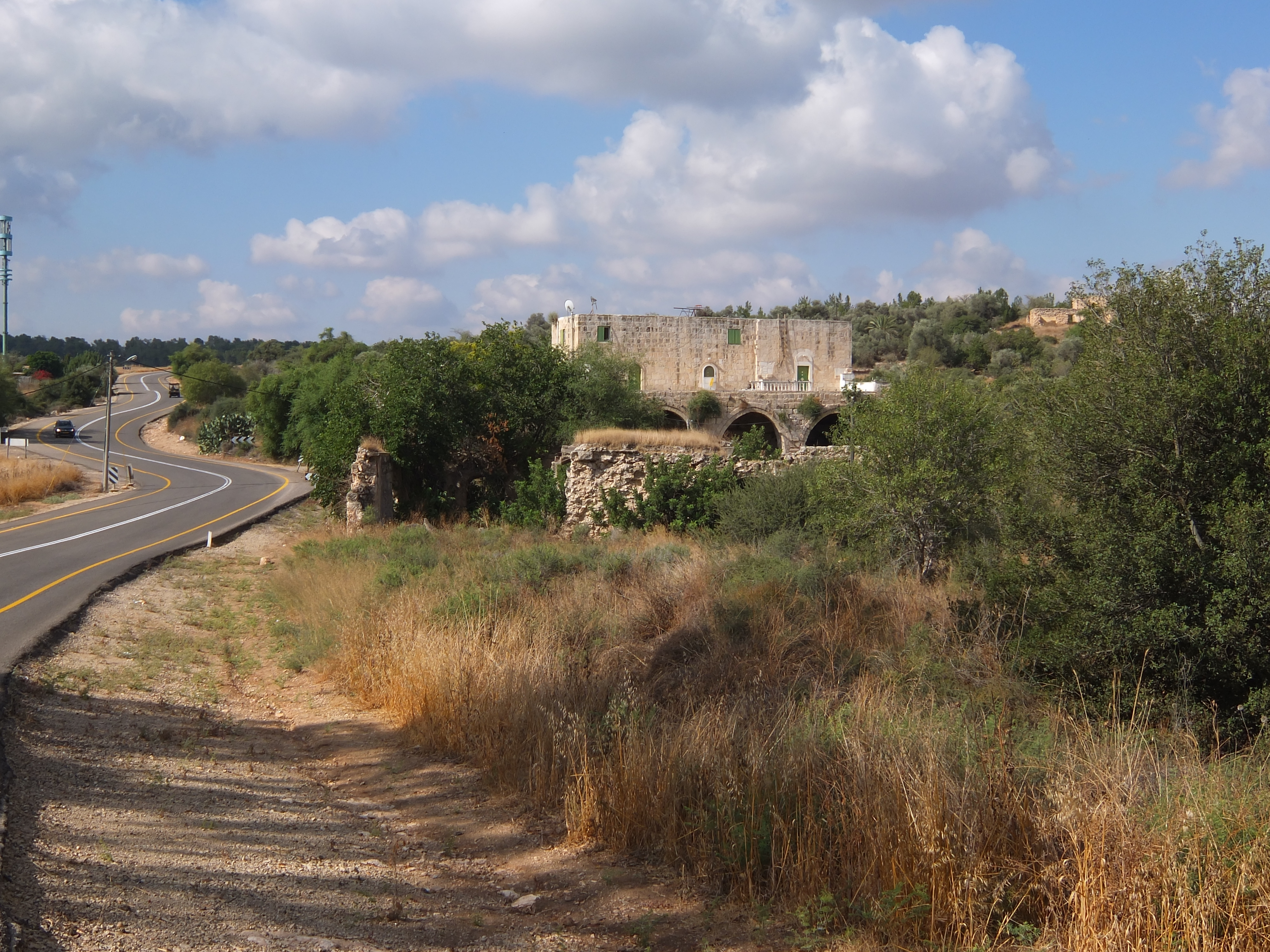
- House in 'Ajjur
- Etymology: Furrows on the sand made by the wind
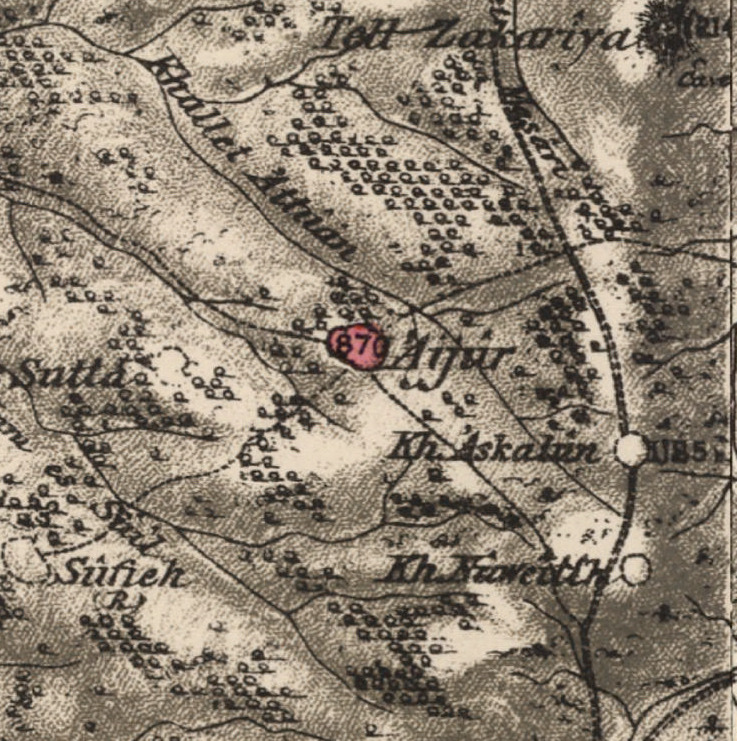
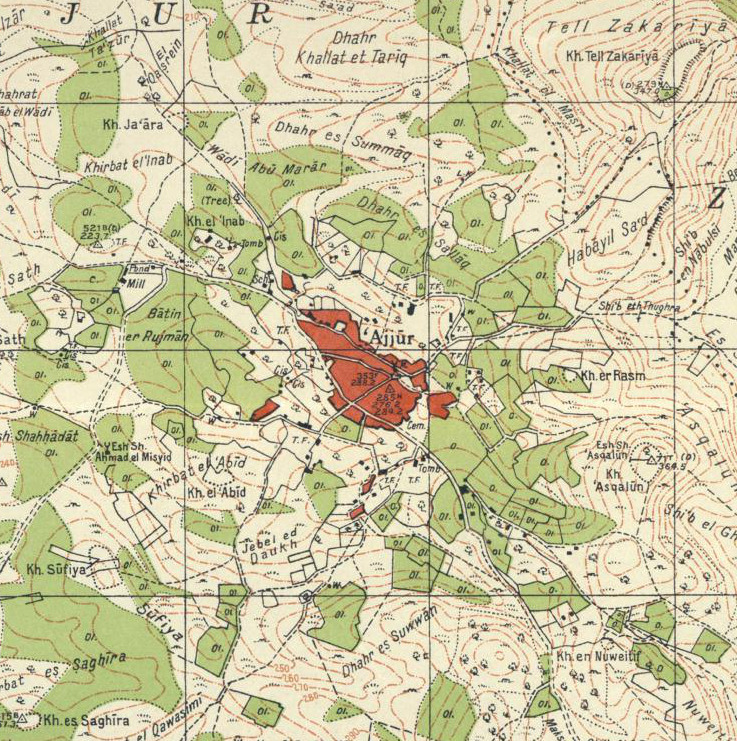
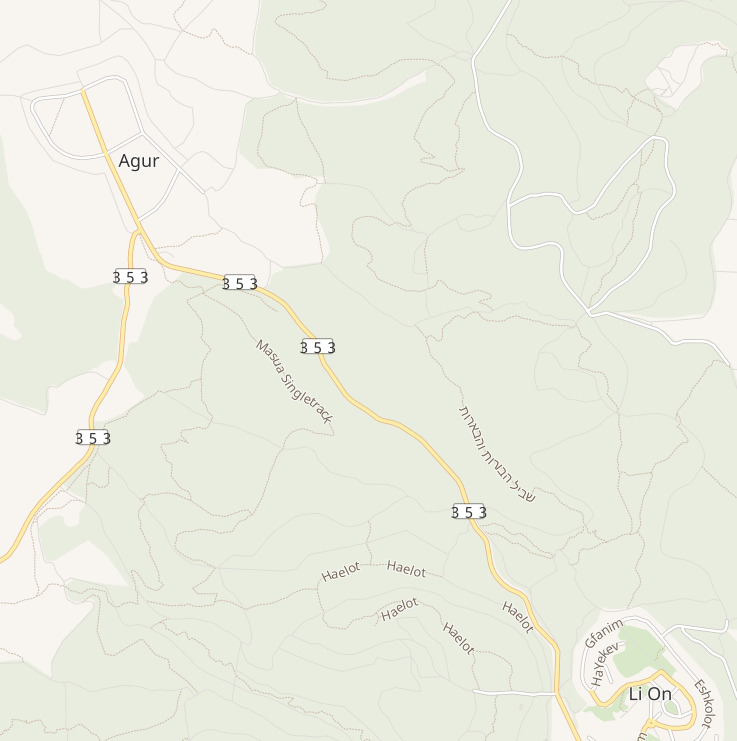
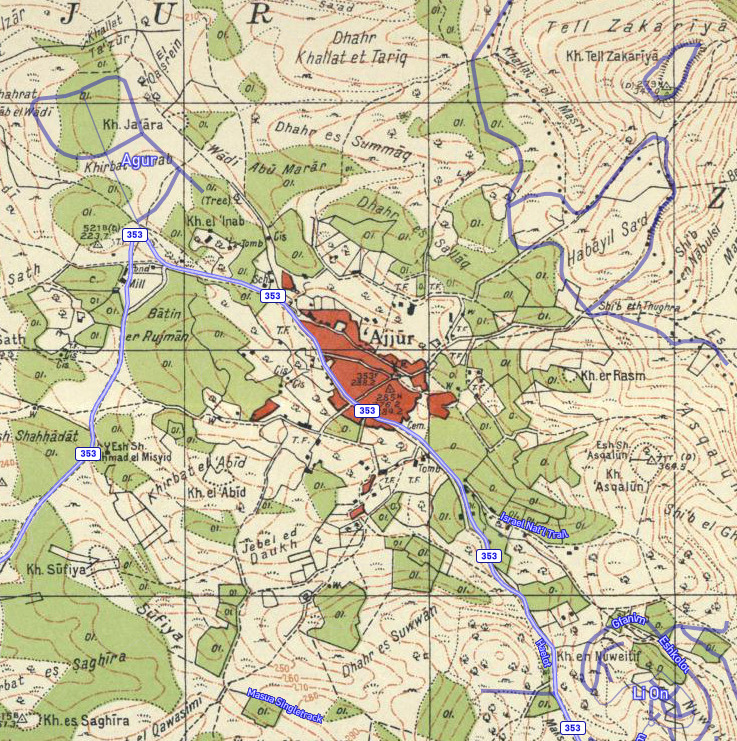
- 1870s map 1940s map modern map 1940s with modern overlay map A series of historical maps of the area around 'Ajjur (click the buttons)

- Location within Mandatory Palestine
- Coordinates: 31°41′22″N 34°55′22″E
- Palestine grid: 142/121
- Geopolitical entity: Mandatory Palestine
- Subdistrict: Hebron
- Date of depopulation: 23–24 July 1948 primary, 23 October 1948 secondary

Area
  - Total: 58.074 km^{2} (22.422 sq mi)

Population (1945)
  - Total: 3,730
- Cause(s) of depopulation: Military assault by Yishuv forces
- Current Localities: Agur, Tzafririm, Givat Yeshayahu, Li-On, Tirosh Britannia Park

'Ajjur (Arabic: عجّور) was a Palestinian Arab village of over 3,700 inhabitants in 1945, located 24 kilometres (15 mi) northwest of Hebron. It became depopulated in 1948 after several military assaults by Israeli military forces. Agur, Tzafririm, Givat Yeshayahu, Li-On, and Tirosh were built on the village lands.

== History ==
Near 'Ajjur, at Khirbet Jannaba, was a probable site of the Battle of Ajnadayn, waged in the 7th-century CE between the Rashidun Caliphate and the Byzantine Empire, and which resulted in a decisive Rashidun victory, incorporating most of Palestine into the domains of Islam. The village of 'Ajjur itself was built during early Fatimid rule in the region in the early twelfth century CE. A mosque was built during this period and continued to serve 'Ajjur's community until its demise. The village 'Ajjur is believed to be named after "a sort of cucumber."

=== Ottoman era ===
Arab chronicler Mujir ad-Din reported that he passed through 'Ajjur on his way from Gaza to Jerusalem in the early sixteenth century, when the village was a part of the Ottoman Empire. By 1596, 'Ajjur was a part of the nahiya ("subdistrict") of Gaza, part of Sanjak Gaza, with 35 Muslim households; an estimated 193 persons. It paid a fine tax rate of 33,3 % on agricultural products, including wheat, barley, fruit, vineyards, beehives, and goats; a total of 5,500 akçe

In 1838 Edward Robinson noted the village as being "small", located in the Gaza district. The villagers were Muslim.

In 1863 Victor Guérin estimated the population to be around 800. Guérin further noted that several houses, including that of the local Sheikh, were built partly with ancient stones. Socin found from an official Ottoman village list from about 1870 that 'Ajjur had 86 houses and a population of 254, though the population count included men, only. Hartmann found that 'Ajjur had 120 houses.

Khirbet er-Rasm lay on the lands of the village of 'Ajjur to the immediate west (see map at top), and they cultivated olive trees at the site in the Ottoman period. They also built stone walls in linear formation over older ones to divide the agricultural land into plots, where they cultivated annual crops, as well as citrus trees, which were likely watered using the ancient cisterns extant at the site.

In the middle of the 19th century, further nearby ruins around the village, such as Khirbet Drusye (Horvat Midras) were absorbed into the territory of ʿAjjūr. Its inhabitants cultivated the surrounding fields, used the underground cavities as animal shelters, and drew water from the Byār Drusye wells in Wādī Drusye. This reflects the mid-19th-century process of rural expansion following the Ottoman Land Code of 1858 and the cadastral surveys of the 1860s, which incorporated formerly state-owned ruins into the cultivated domains of established villages.

In 1882, the PEF's Survey of Western Palestine (SWP) described 'Ajjur as a small village containing olive trees, with most of its houses clustered together, but some dispersed to the west and south. A private school named Abu Hasan was established in this period.

In 1896 the population of 'Ajjur was estimated to be about 1,767 persons.

=== British Mandate era ===
In the 1922 census of Palestine conducted by the British Mandate authorities, 'Ajjur had a population of 2,073 inhabitants, all Muslim, increasing in the 1931 census to 2,917; 4 Christians and the rest Muslims, in a total of 566 residential houses.

During this period, 'Ajjur became economically active in its vicinity. It held a Friday market or souk that attracted consumers and merchants from nearby towns and villages. A second school was founded in the village in 1934, which served students from nearby villages as well as from 'Ajjur. Like other Arab villages in Palestine at the time, 'Ajjur depended on agriculture, which was the basis of its economy. The main crops were olives and wheat. The second most important economic activity was animal husbandry, in particular, goat herding. Animal ownership was a symbol of social status and pride in the village, and residents gave affectionate names to certain types of animals. Animal herding caused seasonal movement by herders to distant dwellings from the village site, but still in its vicinity such as Khirbet al-Sura and Khirbet al-'Ammuriyya. Shoemaking, carpentry, and tanning were other common occupations in 'Ajjur.

In the 1945 statistics, 'Ajjur had a population of 3,730; 10 Christians and 3,720 Muslims, with a total of 58,074 dunams of land. Of this, 2,428 dunums were irrigated or used for plantations, 25,227 dunams were used for cereals, while 171 dunams were built-up (urban) areas.

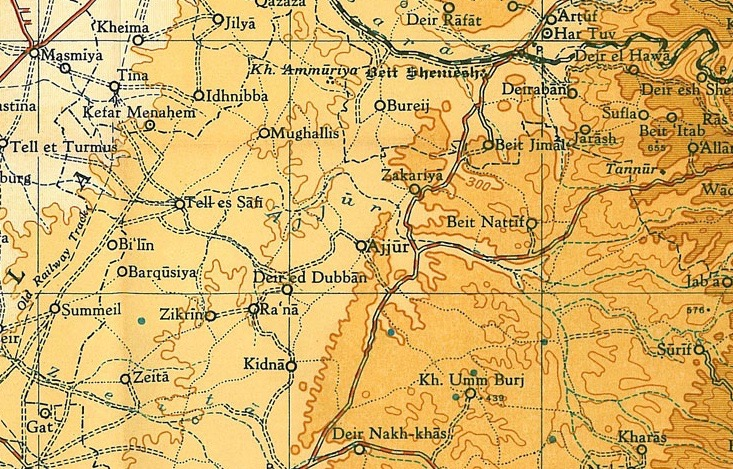
Ajjur 1945 1:250,000

=== 1948 War and aftermath ===
On 23 October 1948, the Fourth Battalion of Israel‘s Giv'ati Brigade occupied ‘Ajjur in the northern front of Operation Yoav, unifying Israeli military operations in the southern and western fronts. Most of ‘Ajjur’s inhabitants had fled before this assault—their flight was triggered by an earlier attack, on 23 July-24.

In 1992, the Palestinian historian Walid Khalidi described the village: “Only three houses remain; two are deserted and one has been turned into a warehouse. One of the deserted houses is a two-story stone structure with a large, triple-arched front porch.” Petersen, who inspected the place in 1994, noted “a large two-story building with a vaulted arcade on the northern side. The upper part of the building is today used as a house while the lower part appears to be abandoned (although it remains locked). The arcade consists of three cross-vaulted bays resting on two free-standing piers and two engaged piers at either end. On the outer (north) face of each of the two central piers there is a stone carved with two rosettes which appears to be part of a classical entablature. The outer arches are emphasized by a flat hood molding. Each bay is covered with a cross-vault which reaches a height of approximately 4m. [..] The upper floor is reached by an external staircase on the east side leading to a walled terrace above the arcade. [..] The identity or function of this building is not known although its design and orientation indicate that it may be a mosque.” In 2000, Meron Benvenisti observed that: “Three large, beautiful structures, which were located outside the village amid orchards of fruit trees, have been renovated, and Jewish families live in them. In one, chamber music concerts are held.”

== See also ==
- List of towns and villages depopulated during the 1947–1949 Palestine war

== Bibliography ==
- Barron, J.B., ed. (1923). Palestine: Report and General Abstracts of the Census of 1922. Government of Palestine.
- Benvenisti, M. (2000). Sacred Landscape: The Buried History of the Holy Land Since 1948. Maxine Kaufman-Lacusta (translator). University of California Press. ISBN 978-0-520-21154-4.
- Conder, C.R.; Kitchener, H.H. (1882). The Survey of Western Palestine: Memoirs of the Topography, Orography, Hydrography, and Archaeology. Vol. 2. London: Committee of the Palestine Exploration Fund.
- Government of Palestine, Department of Statistics (1945). Village Statistics, April, 1945. Archived from the original on 2019-04-02.
- Guérin, V. (1869). Description Géographique Historique et Archéologique de la Palestine (in French). Vol. 1: Judee, pt. 2. Paris: L'Imprimerie Nationale.
- Hadawi, S. (1970). Village Statistics of 1945: A Classification of Land and Area Ownership in Palestine. Palestine Liberation Organization Research Centre. Archived from the original on 2018-12-08.
- Hartmann, M. (1883). "Die Ortschaftenliste des Liwa Jerusalem in dem turgescent Staatskalender dur Syrien auf das Jahr 1288 der Flucht (1871)". Zeitschrift des Deutschen Palästina-Vereins. 6: 102–149.
- Hütteroth, W.-D.; Abdulfattah, K. (1977). Historical Geography of Palestine, Transjordan and Southern Syria in the Late 16th Century. Erlanger Geographische Arbeiten, Sonderband 5. Erlangen, Germany: Vorstand der Fränkischen Geographischen Gesellschaft. ISBN 3-920405-41-2. Archived from the original on 2024-10-08.
- Khalidi, W. (1992). All That Remains: The Palestinian Villages Occupied and Depopulated by Israel in 1948. Washington D.C.: Institute for Palestine Studies. ISBN 0-88728-224-5. Archived from the original on 2024-10-08.
- Mills, E., ed. (1932). Census of Palestine 1931. Population of Villages, Towns and Administrative Areas. Jerusalem: Government of Palestine.
- Morris, B. (2004). The Birth of the Palestinian Refugee Problem Revisited. Cambridge University Press. ISBN 978-0-521-00967-6. Archived from the original on 2024-10-14.
- Moudjir ed-dyn al-'Ulaymi (1876). Sauvaire (ed.). Histoire de Jérusalem et d'Hébron depuis Abraham jusqu'à la fin du XVe siècle de J.-C. : fragments de la Chronique de Moudjir-ed-dyn.
- Palmer, E.H. (1881). The Survey of Western Palestine: Arabic and English Name Lists Collected During the Survey by Lieutenants Conder and Kitchener, R. E. Transliterated and Explained by E.H. Palmer. Committee of the Palestine Exploration Fund.
- Petersen, Andrew (2001). A Gazetteer of Buildings in Muslim Palestine (British Academy Monographs in Archaeology). Vol. 1. Oxford University Press. ISBN 978-0-19-727011-0. Archived from the original on 2021-05-29.
- Robinson, E.; Smith, E. (1841). Biblical Researches in Palestine, Mount Sinai and Arabia Petraea: A Journal of Travels in the year 1838. Vol. 2. Boston: Crocker & Brewster.
- Schick, C. (1896). "Zur Einwohnerzahl des Bezirks Jerusalem". Zeitschrift des Deutschen Palästina-Vereins. 19: 120–127.
- Socin, A. (1879). "Alphabetisches Verzeichniss von Ortschaften des Paschalik Jerusalem". Zeitschrift des Deutschen Palästina-Vereins. 2: 135–163.
