= Tirosh =

Tirosh: תירוש (Hebrew)
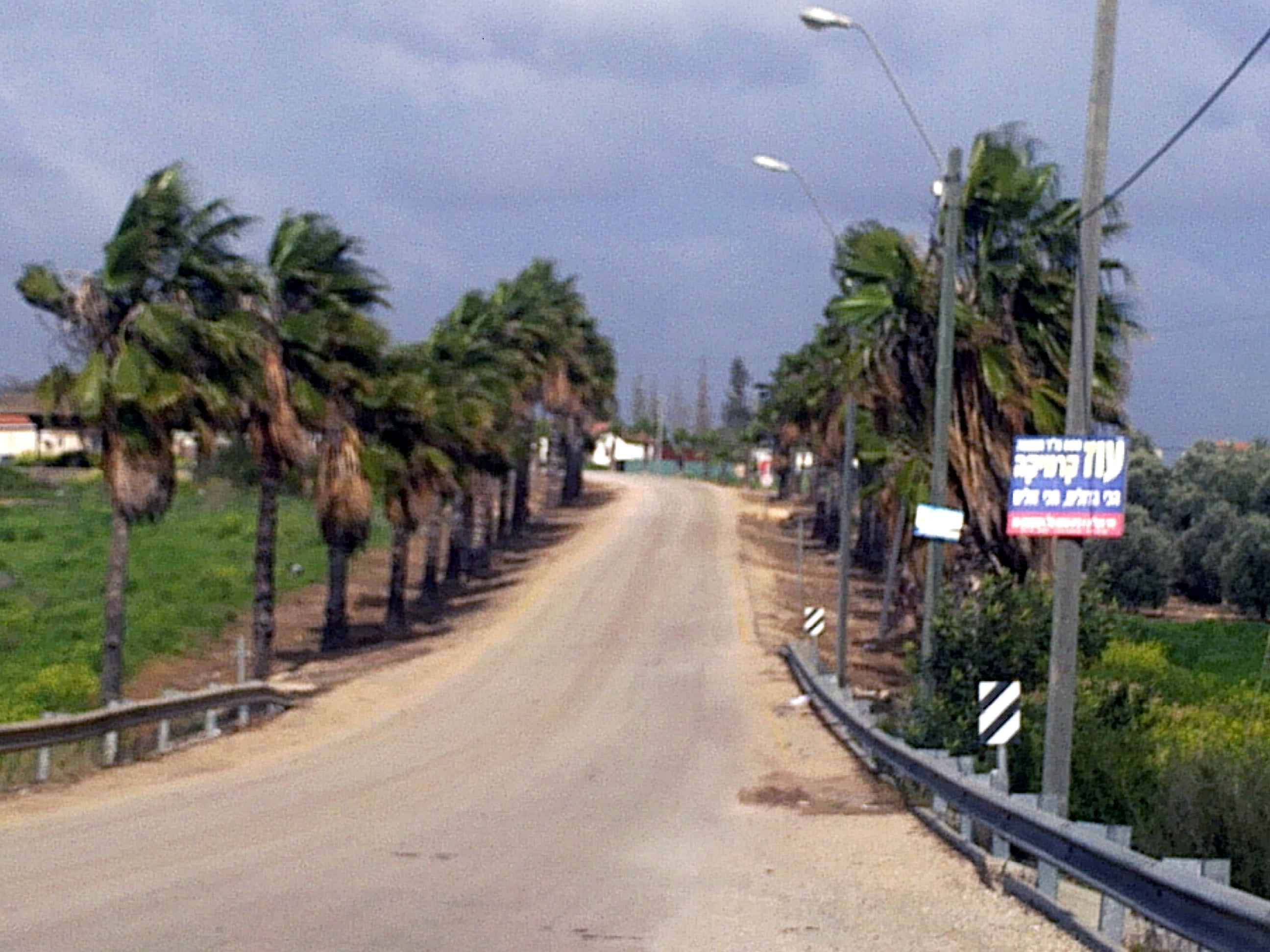

- Location within Jerusalem District
- Coordinates: 31°44′59″N 34°53′11″E
- Country: Israel
- District: Jerusalem
- Council: Mateh Yehuda
- Affiliation: Hapoel HaMizrachi
- Founded: 1955
- Founder: North African Jews
- Population (2024): 482

Tirosh (Hebrew: תִּירוֹשׁ, lit. 'Grape juice') is a moshav in central Israel. Located between Beit Shemesh and Kiryat Malakhi, it falls under the jurisdiction of Mateh Yehuda Regional Council. In 2024 it had a population of 482.

== History ==
The village was established in 1955 by Jewish immigrants and refugees from North Africa. The chosen site had previously belonged to the depopulated Palestinian village of 'Ajjur before the 1948 Arab-Israeli War.

Its name is derived from the fact that there are many vineyards in the area.

Just outside the village is the reported location of a storage facility for nuclear weapons.
