= Horvat Uza =

Archaeological site in Israel

Horvat Uza, Khirbet Ghazzeh
- חורבת עוזה (Hebrew)
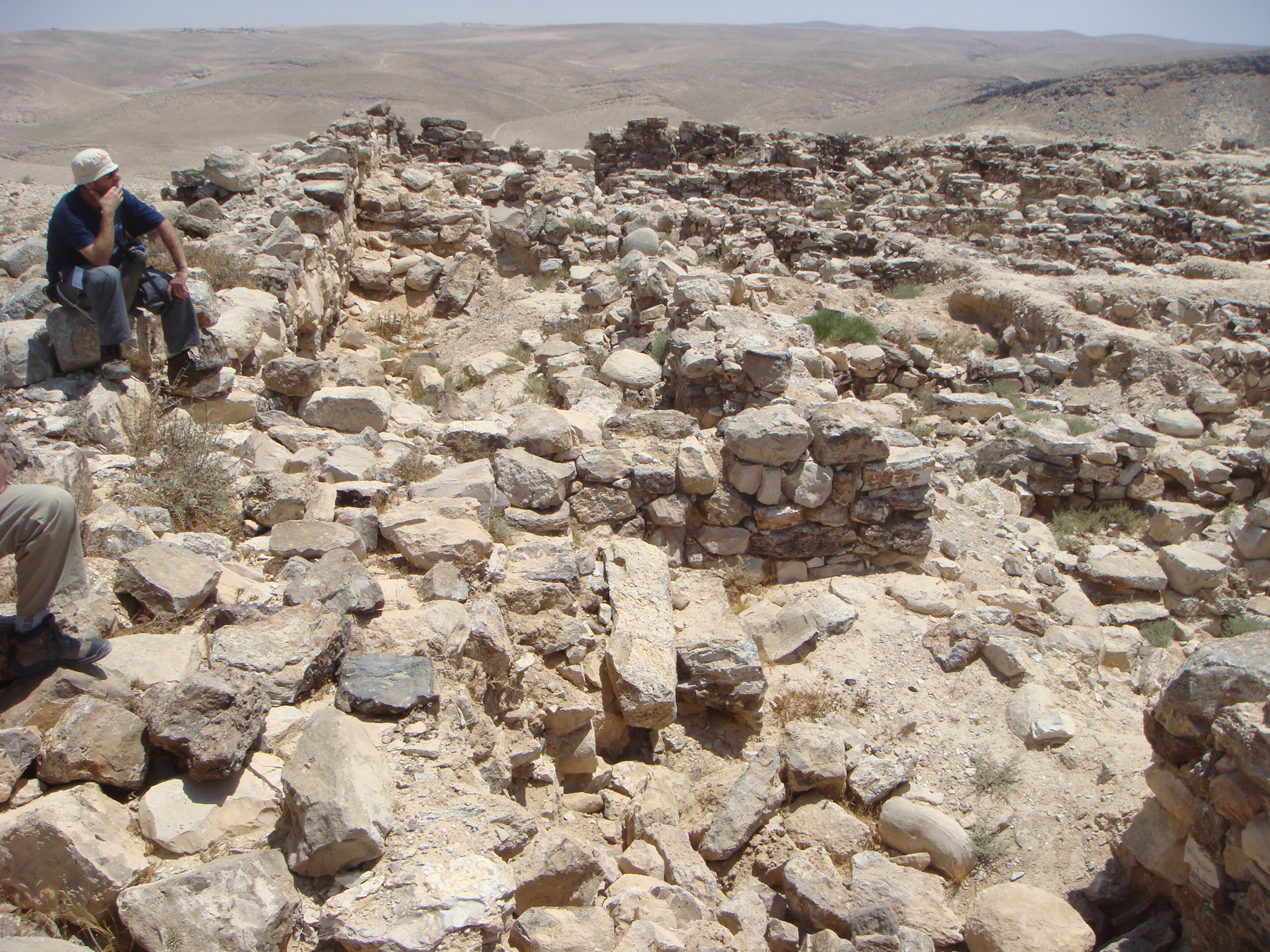
- Hurvat Uzza, overlooking Kina River at Arad Valley, Israel.

- Location within Israel
- 31°12′33″N 35°09′56″E
- Type: Fortress
- Periods: Iron Age
- Cultures: Judahites
- Location: Southern District, Israel
- Region: Negev

Horvat Uza (Hebrew: חורבת עוזה), originally known as Arabic: خربة غزة, romanized: translit, lit. 'khirbet ghazzeh') is an archaeological site located in the northeast of the Negev desert in Israel. The site is located in the east of the Arad Valley and overlooks Nahal Qinah (Qinah Valley). In ancient times, forts were established there to control the wadi road, linking Judea to Arabah and the territory of Edom. Horvat Uza has been identified as Qina, mentioned by Josephus in book 15 of his Antiquities, though one of the archaeologists who made that identification later decided Qina was more likely to be located at Khirbet Taiyib.

== Archaeology ==
The site was first excavated in the 1950s by Nahman Avigad. The excavations revealed that the site was inhabited from the Iron Age II (9th-6th centuries BCE) until the Byzantine period (4th-7th centuries CE). The site was abandoned in the 6th century BCE, possibly due to the destruction of the Kingdom of Judah by the Babylonians.

Several ostraca and seals written in the Edomite language have been discovered at this site, some bearing the name of Qos, a storm deity. Limited knowledge of the Edomite language due to the scarcity of written artifacts available for study prior to these finds, as well as their use of the same Phoenician and later Aramaic alphabets resulted in them being initially identified as Hebrew. The finds have revealed features of the Edomite language, allowing scholars to classify it as part of the Canaanite branch of Iron Age Northwest Semitic languages.

Other notable finds from the site are a number of inscribed potsherds with inscriptions in everal inscribed potsherds with inscriptions in Hebrew, dated to the 7th-century BCE. These mention the name of the site, “Uza”, and the names of several people, including a man named “Ahaz” and a woman named “Ataliah”.

The majority of the personal names inscribed in Hebrew on artifacts found in Horvat Uza incorporate the theophoric Yahweh, and this is a common characteristic of sites where there was a Judahite military fortress.

Scholars identify Khirbet Uza as one of several Idumaean sites that were depopulated in the military campaigns of conquest waged by Hasmonean Judea between 112 and 108 BC, along with Tel Beersheba, Lachish, Tel Arad, Tel Ira, and Khirbet er-Rasm.
