= Givat Yeshayahu =

Givat Yeshayahu: גבעת ישעיהו (Hebrew)
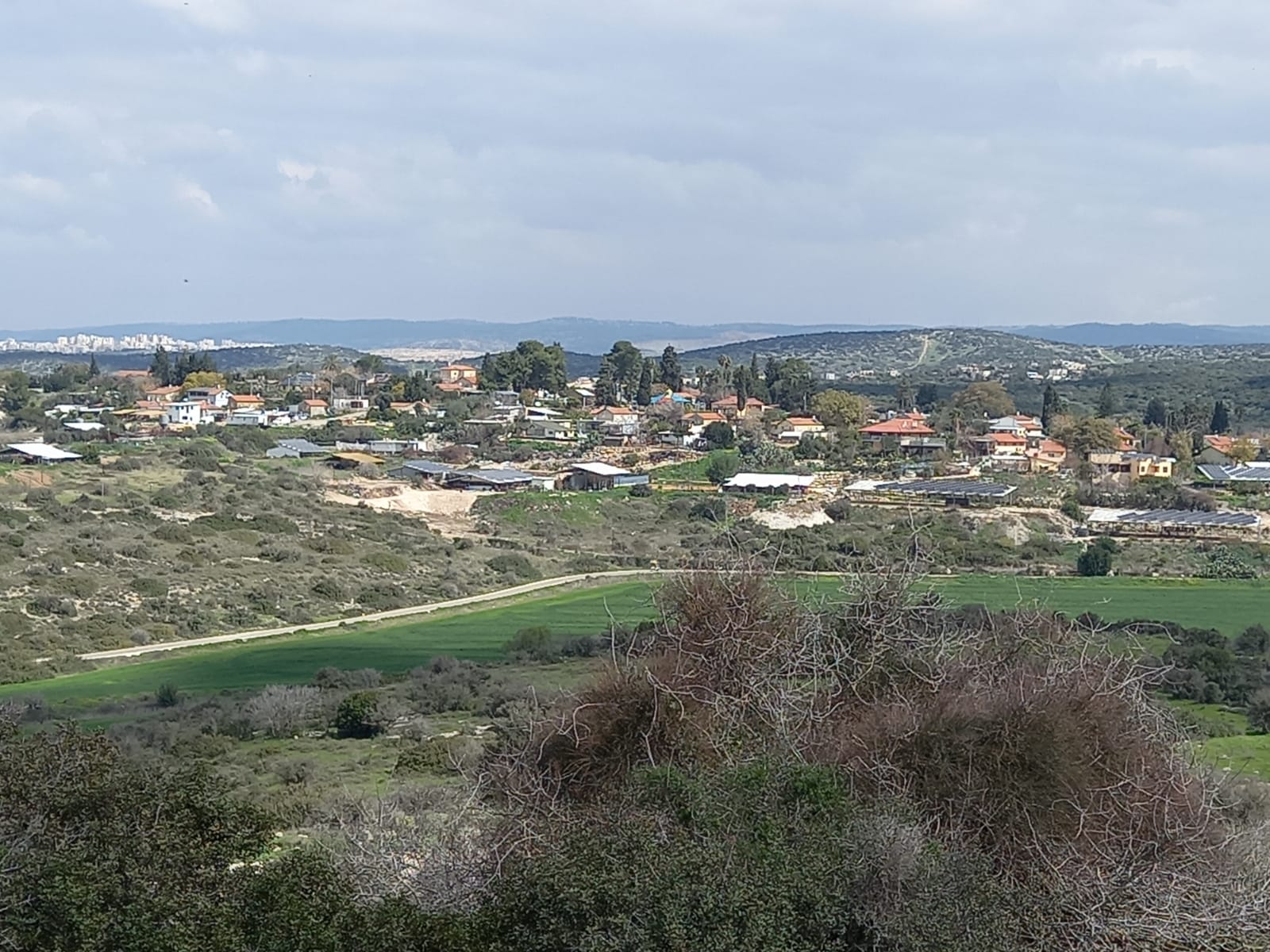

- Location within Jerusalem District
- Coordinates: 31°40′11″N 34°57′2″E
- Country: Israel
- District: Jerusalem
- Council: Mateh Yehuda
- Affiliation: HaOved HaTzioni
- Founded: 1958
- Founder: Hungarian Jews
- Population (2024): 719

Givat Yeshayahu (Hebrew: גִּבְעַת יְשַׁעְיָהוּ, lit. 'Isaiah Hill') is a moshav in central Israel. Located in the Valley of Elah around ten kilometres south of Beit Shemesh, it falls under the jurisdiction of Mateh Yehuda Regional Council. In 2024 it had a population of 719.

== History ==
Givat Yeshayahu was established in 1958 by immigrants from Hungary, members of the Jewish youth movement HaNoar HaTzioni and was named after Yeshayahu Press, a prominent researcher. It was built on the land of the depopulated Palestinian village of 'Ajjur.

In 2016, ancient Roman milestones from Highway 38 were moved to an archaeological park on the outskirts of Givat Yeshayahu.

Givat Yeshayahu, surrounded by wineries and ancient wine presses, operates a factory that produces raisins although most raisins in Israel today are imported from California.
