= Tzafririm =

Moshav in central Israel

Tzafririm: צפרירים (Hebrew)
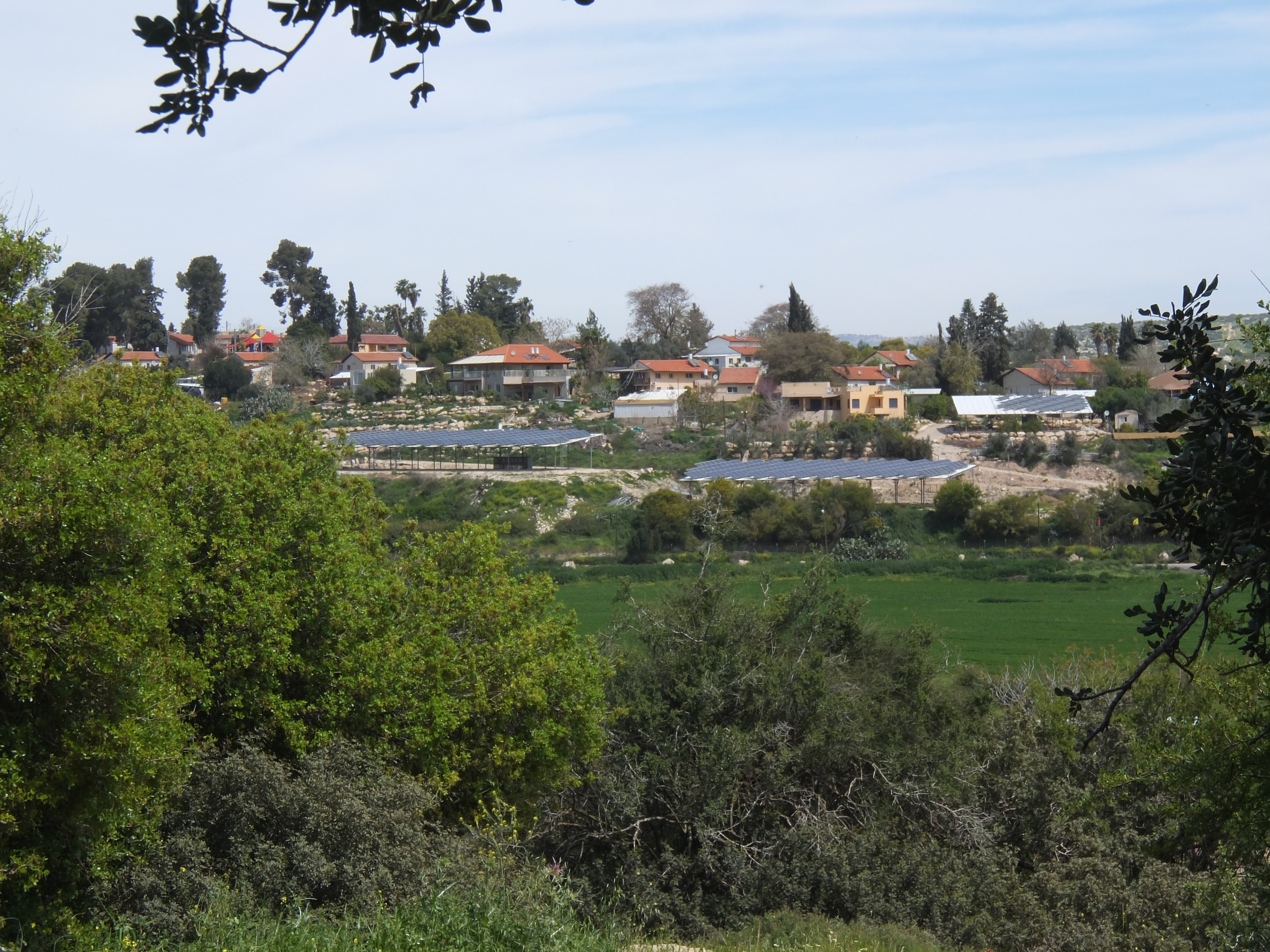
- Etymology: 'Zephyrs'
- Location within Jerusalem District Location within Israel
- Coordinates: 31°39′37″N 34°56′33″E
- Country: Israel
- District: Jerusalem
- Council: Mateh Yehuda
- Affiliation: Moshavim Movement
- Founded: 1958
- Founder: Persian, Iraqi, Indian and Maghrebi Jews
- Population (2024): 438

Tzafririm (Hebrew: צַפְרִירִים, lit. 'Zephyrs') is a moshav in central Israel. Located near Beit Shemesh, it falls under the jurisdiction of Mateh Yehuda Regional Council. In 2024 it had a population of 438.

== History ==
The village was established in 1958 by immigrants from Morocco, Iran, Iraq and India, on land that had previously belonged to the depopulated Palestinian village of 'Ajjur before the 1948 Arab-Israeli War.

== Notable people ==
- Aarele Ben Arieh, artist

== Gallery ==
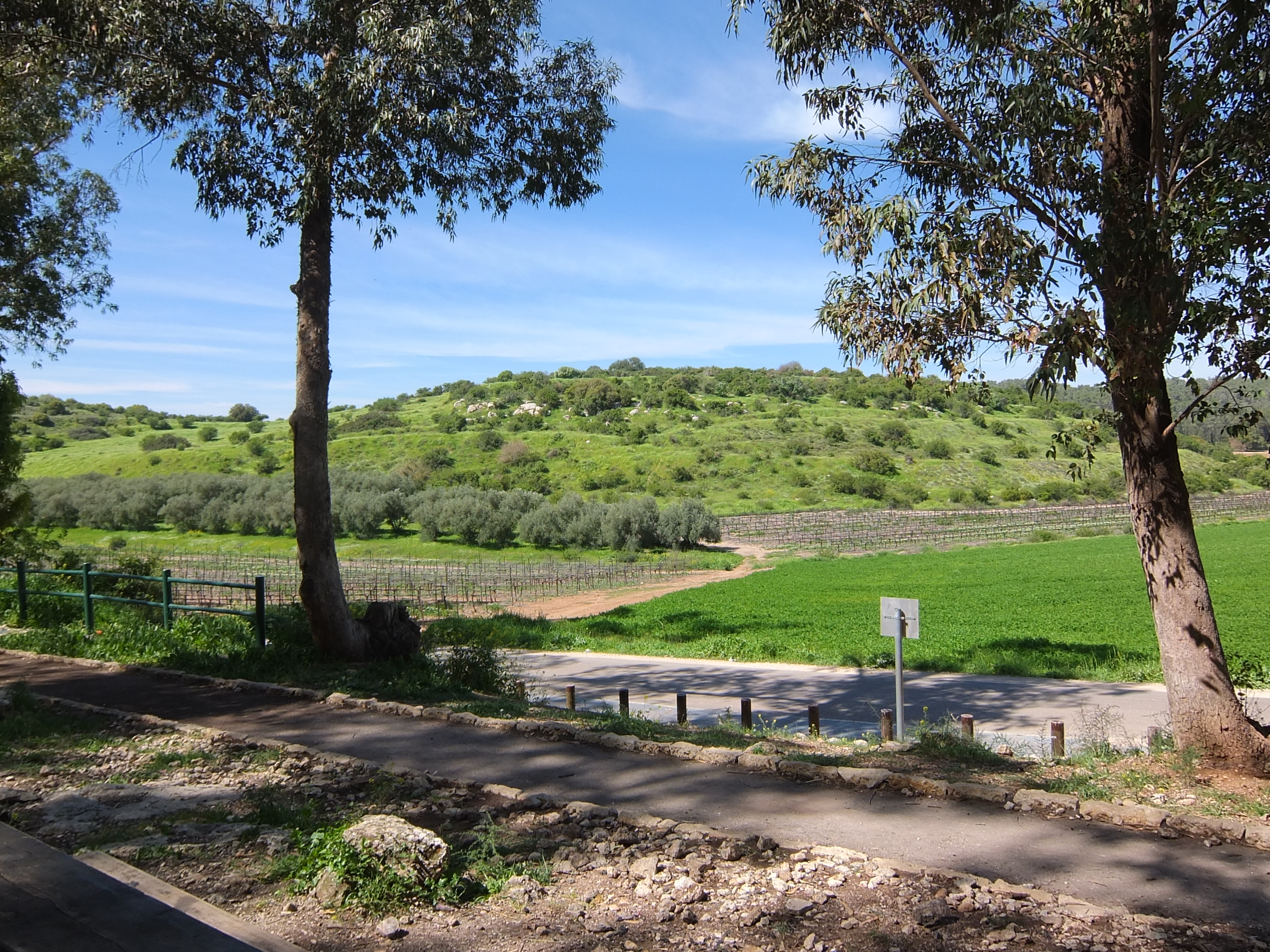
A verdant green hill near Moshav Tzafririm

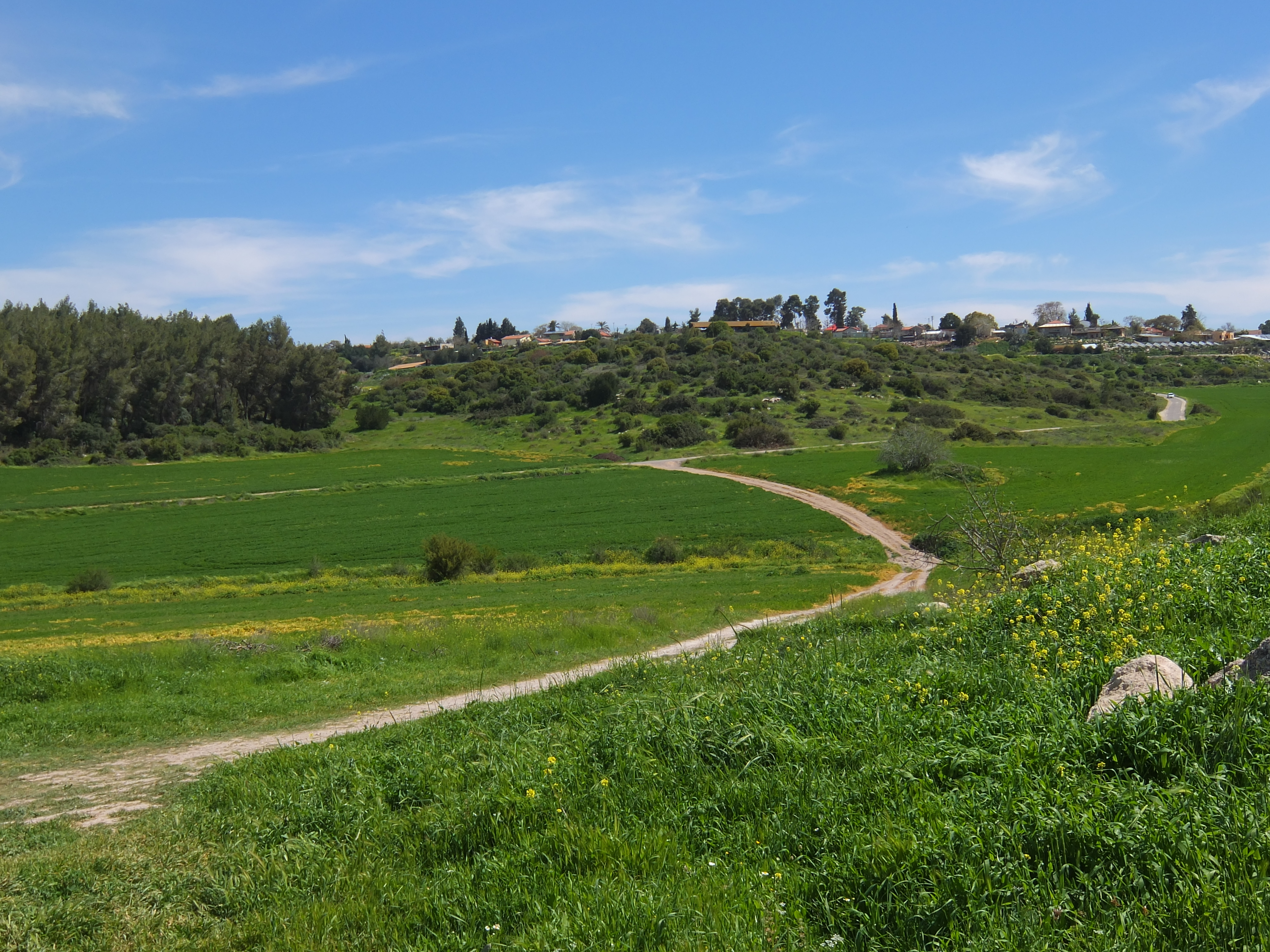
Moshav "Tzafririm" in Spring

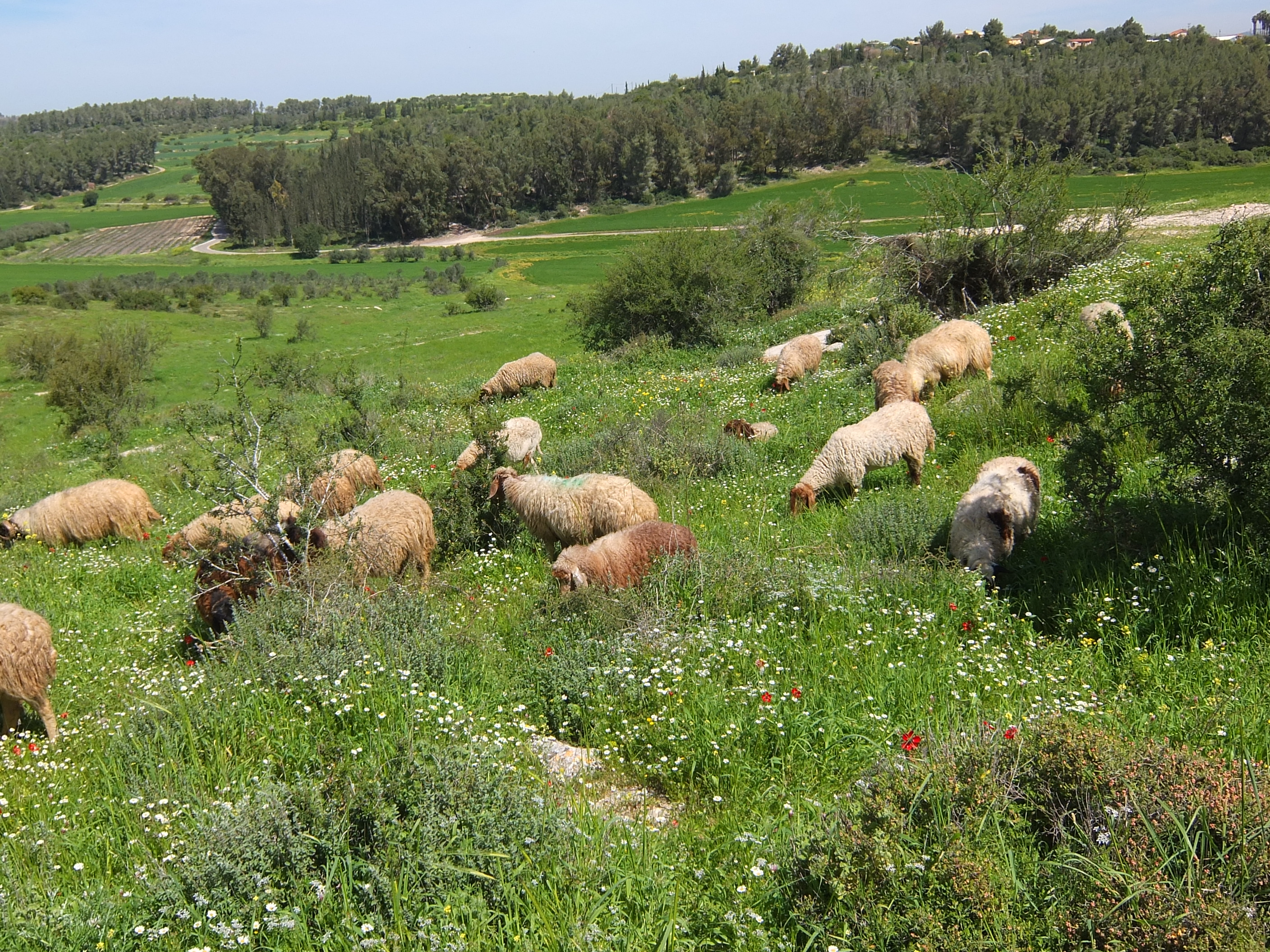
Grazing sheep near the Moshav

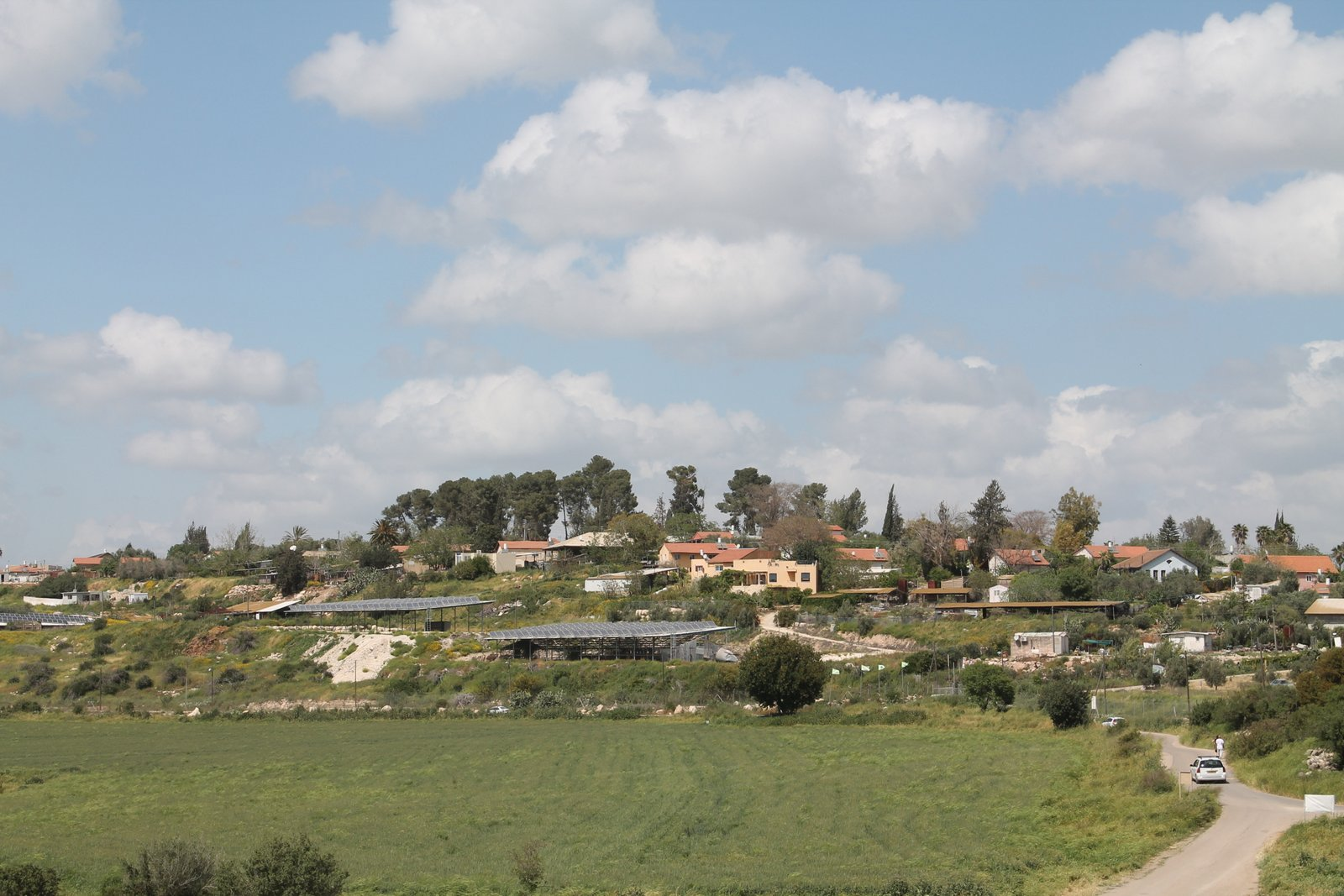
Moshav Tzafririm
