= Killing of Shani Louk =

2023 killing of Nova music festival attendee in Israel

- Part of the Nova music festival massacre
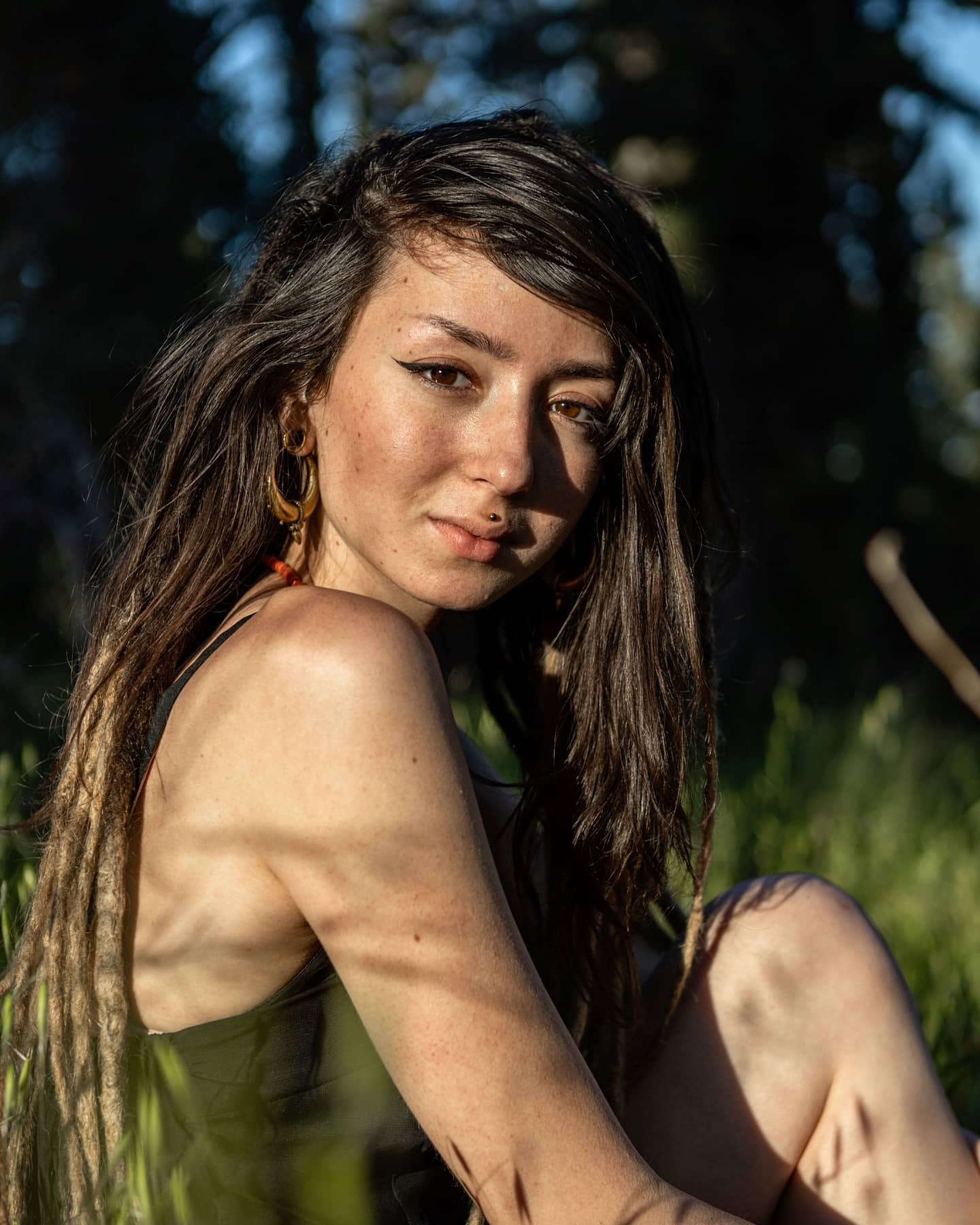
- Louk in 2021
- Location: Near Re'im, Israel
- Date: 7 October 2023
- Attack type: Homicide
- Victims: Shani Louk, aged 22
- Perpetrator: Hamas

On 7 October 2023, during the Nova music festival massacre, Shani Nicole Louk (Hebrew: שני ניקול לוק), a 22-year-old German-Israeli tattoo artist and influencer, was killed. Shortly after the attack, a video circulated showing her body paraded through the streets of Gaza City by Hamas militants in the back of a pickup truck. Described by security experts and commentators as Hamas's social media propaganda, it became one of the first viral videos of the Gaza war. The images became emblematic of militants' conduct toward civilians in the October 7 attacks. (Note: The Guardian: "A young Israeli-German woman whose fate became indelibly associated around the globe with the Hamas massacre and mass kidnapping rampage of 7 October was killed during the attack, her family has said.")

Attention was also brought to Louk's case by her family, beginning with her mother Ricarda saying that she had received information that Louk was alive and in a Gaza hospital. She appealed to the German government and received responses from top-ranking German officials. German authorities considered Louk to be among their nationals taken hostage during the war. At the end of the month, Israel confirmed Louk's death based on the discovery of a skull fragment on the road leading out of the festival grounds, indicating that she was killed during the attack, while trying to escape. On 17 May 2024 Israeli forces recovered her body from a tunnel in Gaza, and she was buried in her hometown of Srigim a couple of days later.

== Shani Louk ==
Shani Louk was born on 7 February 2001 in Israel to an Israeli father and German mother, Ricarda Louk, who had lived in Ravensburg, Germany, and moved to Israel in the early 1990s. Louk and her family moved to Portland, Oregon, U.S., in the early 2000s, and she attended kindergarten at Portland Jewish Academy.

Louk later became a resident of Tel Aviv, where she worked as a freelance tattoo artist and also had a following as an Instagram influencer. According to Louk's aunt, she held pacifist views and obtained an exemption from military service in Israel, which she said was facilitated by her dual citizenship.

== Killing and parading of body ==
=== Events during the Nova music festival massacre ===
On 7 October 2023, Hamas militants launched a large-scale rocket attack and an incursion into Israel from the Gaza Strip, against military bases and civilians, perpetrating multiple massacres, including a massacre of attendees of a music festival. The open-air psychedelic trance festival, named Supernova Sukkot Gathering, coincided with the final day of Sukkot (6 October) and Simchat Torah (7 October), and took place in the western Negev desert, approximately 5 km (3.1 mi) from the Gaza–Israel barrier, near Re'im.

Louk was at the festival, accompanied by her boyfriend, Orión Hernández Radoux, a Mexican citizen. After the Red Color rocket warning alarm was sounded, and the attack began, Louk spoke on the phone with her mother, saying that there were few places to hide and that she would try to find one. She was killed while attempting to reach safety and was reported as missing at the time.

=== Viral video ===
Hours later that day, a video emerged showing Louk's body, (Note: Recognized by Louk's mother and verified by CNN) (Note: The Guardian: "Hours later video emerged of the body of a woman, in the back of a white pickup truck with several gunmen being taken to Gaza, who her family quickly recognised."; The Times: "The video footage of Shani’s lifeless body, splayed face down on the back of a pick-up truck, was widely circulated during the early days of the war.") partially clothed, with a significant head injury and blood-matted hair, being paraded in the streets of Gaza City by Hamas militants in the back of a pickup truck; they were exclaiming "Allahu Akbar" and were joined in the cheers by the people in the crowd surrounding the vehicle, some of whom spat on the body. The video went viral, becoming one of the first viral videos of the Gaza war. It was released in a wave of videos of Hamas members parading hostages and bodies. Photographs were also taken and circulated online.

According to security experts interviewed by Agence France-Presse, the release of the video, along with other videos showing dead or captured civilians, has the character of deliberate and sophisticated propaganda aimed to induce feelings of "helplessness, paralysis, and humiliation" in the population, and that viral spread of such materials causes amplification of narratives desirable to Hamas. In a New York Times column, Nicholas Kristof discussed the video as an example of the causes of psychological trauma and anger experienced within Jewish communities in the aftermath of the attacks. According to commentator Bobby Ghosh, Hamas released propaganda videos quickly, wanting to be the first to score psychological warfare gains; however, the video showing Louk did not demoralize Israeli society, and instead her "treatment at the hands of [her] captors drew widespread revulsion and reprobation, and if anything, strengthened Israeli resolve to exact retribution."

Despite Hamas being banned on Twitter as a terrorist organization, some of its propaganda videos have circulated there after being reposted from other platforms. Journalists discussed the video showing Louk together with other Hamas-related content that was being shared, in the context of the European Commission's warning to Twitter owner Elon Musk about permitting spread of illegal content. On 12 October, the European Commission initiated an investigation against Twitter for dissemination of "violent and terrorist content" and other forms of illegal content.

=== Associated Press photograph ===
Before the scene from the viral video, as the pickup truck was returning to the Gaza Strip, it was photographed by an Associated Press (AP) freelance photojournalist. The image, showing the vehicle carrying Louk's body and the attackers, was featured as the first in a series of 20 photographs from the war taken by the AP's team of photographers which won the "Team Picture Story of the Year" prize at the 2024 Pictures of the Year International competition.

On 28 February 2024, the families of Shani Louk and four other Nova music festival massacre victims filed a civil lawsuit in the Jerusalem District Court against the AP and Reuters, seeking NIS 25 million ($6.5 million) in damages. According to the lawsuit, certain photographers whose photos of 7 October events these news agencies published were embedded with Hamas and were complicit with the crimes committed, rendering the agencies vicariously liable for the actions of the perpetrators. The agencies denied the accusation. A similar lawsuit against the AP was filed in the United States District Court for the Southern District of Florida, citing alleged violations of anti-terrorism legislation; it was rejected in December 2024.

== Family's campaign ==
From early on, there were media reports that Louk had been killed, describing the video as depicting her lifeless body. According to The Times of Israel, "it seemed likely at the time that Louk was no longer alive." Members of Louk's family believed that she was still alive, and her mother, Ricarda Louk, appealed to the German government for help. Ricarda said that she had received information, through a friend with a contact in Gaza, that Louk was receiving treatment at a hospital in Gaza for a serious head injury and was in critical condition. A later report by Human Rights Watch stated that it was due to the footage that the family believed that Louk had suffered her head injury. Ricarda received a bank notification that Louk's credit card had been used on 8 October near Indonesia Hospital in Gaza.

In the following weeks, Louk's friends and family members participated in a public campaign to influence the government to treat the rescue of hostages during the invasion of the Gaza Strip as the highest priority. On 13 October, during her visit to Israel, German minister for foreign affairs Annalena Baerbock met with Ricarda and family members of abductees with German citizenship. After the meeting, Ricarda spoke at a press conference saying that German-Israeli citizens will receive support from Germany and that the German government is "really serious" and "trying to find solutions". Baerbock said that Germany is "in communications with all actors who have contact with Hamas" to send a message that the hostages must be freed. Members of the families, including the Louk family, subsequently met with German chancellor Olaf Scholz during his 17 October solidarity visit to Israel. The German authorities had counted Louk as one of their nationals taken hostage during the war, and many were erroneously believing that she had been abducted.

Louk's father, Nissim Louk, participated in the campaign less conspicuously, not wanting to draw attention to his military and intelligence background. He travelled to the United States where he talked to Robert F. Kennedy Jr., and also with U.S. senators.

== Confirmation of death ==
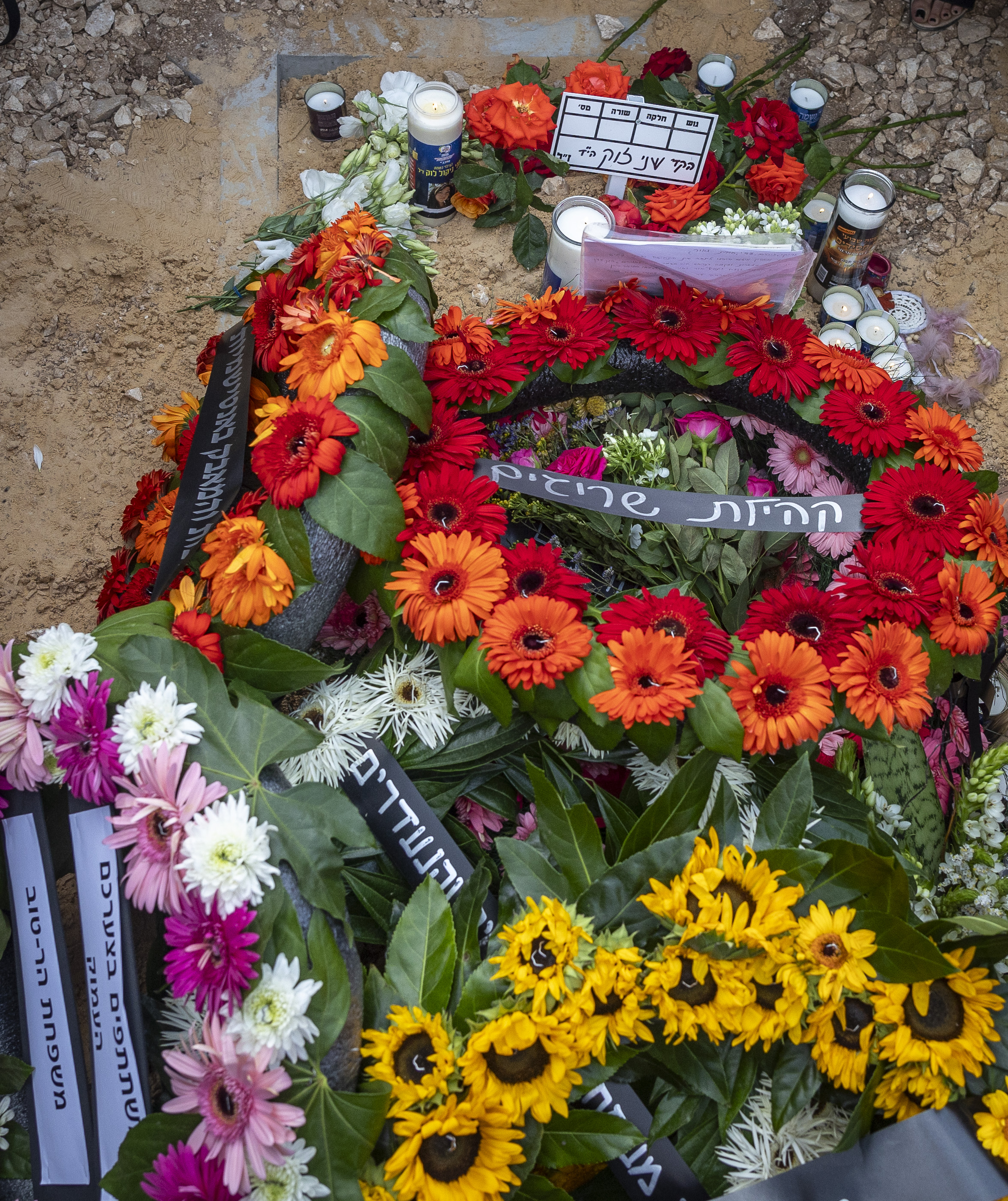
Shani Louk's grave on the day of her funeral

On 30 October 2023, the German and Israeli governments confirmed Louk's death. Forensic examiners found the petrous part of the temporal bone from her skull on a road leading out of the festival grounds, with her DNA. Dislodgement of this bone is indicative of death, according to the Abu Kabir Forensic Institute. Israel considers her to have been killed before her body was transported to Gaza. In response to the new information, Focus wrote that it became certain that she was killed during the massacre.

Isaac Herzog, President of Israel, told the German tabloid Bild that Louk had been "decapitated"; his spokesperson corrected this, saying that "the fact that a significant part of her skull was found triggered fears that she had been decapitated." Despite the correction, the false information spread on social media and was repeated in several German politicians' statements.

Louk's body was recovered by the Israel Defense Forces and the Shin Bet on 17 May 2024 in a Gaza Strip tunnel, along with the bodies of three other people (two of whom were also victims from the music festival massacre). Prior to the body being found, the family could not conduct the funeral, but they sat shiva, during which their home was visited by around 4,000 people in expression of solidarity, according to Ricarda. Louk's funeral took place on 19 May, in Srigim, and was attended by hundreds.

== Legacy ==
Louk's family encouraged people to download Louk's designs and use them for their own tattoos to honor her creative talent. An exhibition of her drawings, "Forever young Forever art", was shown at Tel Aviv's Nahum Gutman Museum in 2024. Rabbi Shmuley Boteach dedicated a Torah scroll in Louk's memory. The German press ran numerous stories about Louk.

On 20 October 2026, the Israel Defense Forces and Shin Bet announced the killing of Tamer Muhammad Ibrahim al-Sabbagh, the last free member of the Hamas cell that abducted Louk, in an airstrike in Jabalia. Three other members were killed and the other was captured by Israeli forces during the Gaza war.

== See also ==
- Kidnapping of Naama Levy – Israeli hostage taken by Hamas in 2023
- Kidnapping of Noa Argamani – Israeli hostage taken by Hamas in 2023
- Awad Darawshe – Israeli-Arab paramedic and victim of Hamas
- List of solved missing person cases (2020s)
- Women in the Gaza war – Experience of Israeli and Palestinian women
