= Aarele Ben Arieh =

Israeli artist and sculptor (born 1955)

Ben Arieh בן אריה
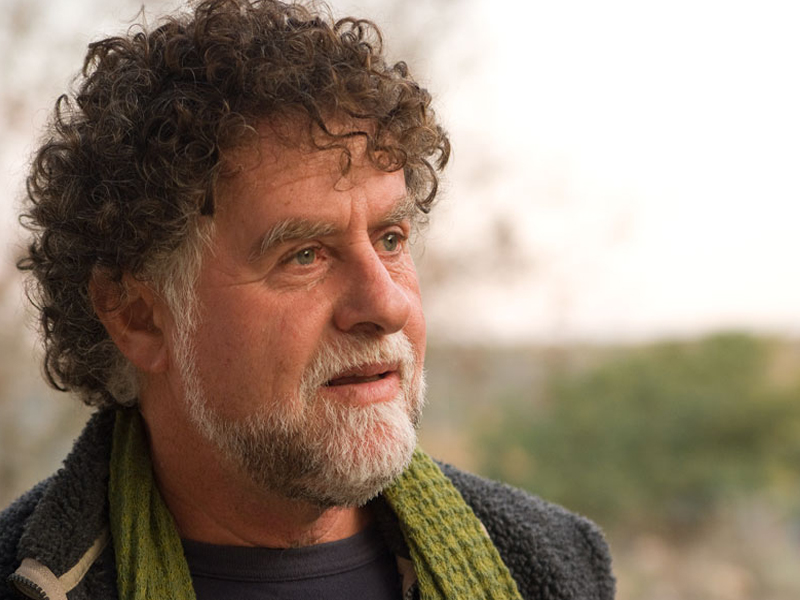
- Arieh in 2012
- Born: Aharon (Aarele) Ben Arieh; 1955 (age 70–71); Haifa, Israel
- Style: Sculpture
- Website: www.aarale.com

Aaron "Aarele" Ben Arieh (Hebrew: אארלה בן אריה; born 1955) is an Israeli artist and sculptor known for his monumental environmental artworks.

== Biography ==
Aharon (Aarele / Aarale) Ben Arieh was born in Haifa in 1955, and today his home and work base are in Moshav Tzafririm in the Ella Valley region. He grew up in Kiryat Gat. From an early age, he was drawn to sculpture and spent his free time in his father's workshop for farming equipment, training in metalwork. After completing his IDF military service in the Airborne Nahal battalion, he joined his friends at Kibbutz Kerem Shalom, where he set up a sculpture studio and a workshop for the development and improvement of agricultural machinery.

In the early 1980s, Ben Arieh developed close ties with potters and carpenters in the Gaza Strip. He worked alongside them as an apprentice and considered them his guides and mentors in art. He drew inspiration from Palestinian material culture, the unique colorful paintings of pilgrims returning from Mecca and the vast expanses of sand dunes. He also studied under sculptor Moshe Shek (Jook) and painter Rafi Mintz.

== Art career ==
Ben Arieh creates outdoor sculptures that create points of contact between the public and the environment. He specializes in projects that invite physical interaction such as sculpture playgrounds, park shades and public seating. "His point of origin is anchored in the material, or rather in the point where the material and the concept meet. The what and how go hand in hand. His pieces consist of dozens of interconnected elements which join to form one flawlessly shaped whole..." (Izika Gaon, Curator of the Israel Museum, at the opening of “The Concept in the Material” exhibition, 1987). Ben Arieh calls himself “The Place Doctor."

The artist first creates small sculptures, and then reproduces them on a larger scale to finally place them in vast environments. This has allowed him to go beyond his limits and to realize, to this day, some of his most important artworks.

His work strives for simplicity and precision that nonetheless makes a powerful statement. Using natural materials, he creates sculptures which make people feel comfortable in their natural environment. "I endeavor for graceful truth that encourages forgiveness. My pieces offer a personal experience in both the private and public domain.” Motion and playfulness are central themes in Ben Arieh's indoor pieces as well as his outdoor work. Thus, he invites the audience to communicate physically and unmediated with his work.

== Select works and exhibitions ==
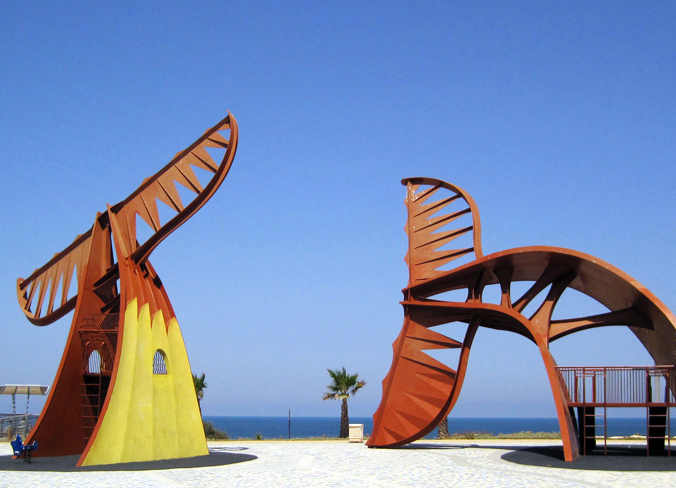
Aarele Ben Arieh - The Whale Tails

Ben Arieh's sculpture can be seen in public and private locations in Israel and around the world. His most well-known pieces include The Whale Tails on the coast of Ashkelon, "The Goat from Jerusalem" at Hoyer (Danemark), The Spider in Holon, "The Moving Stone" in Carrare (Italy),"Flying Camels" at Um Mutla (Jordan), Ecolog Lenin in Berlin, The Dinosaurs in Kiryat Ata, Calm in the Arch in Ganei Tikva and a sculpture in Gan Gurim in Holon . A new project is underway for the city of Stuttgart in Germany.

In 1987, the Israel Museum held Ben Arieh's “Toy Sculptures” exhibition, displaying varied pieces from his Gaza stint. In 1997, the Israel Museum presented his "The Concept in the Material" exhibition for the second time. "Song of the Crank" at Gerstein Gallery in Tel Aviv presented a series of mechanical toy sculptures made of tin and wood.

== See also ==
- Visual arts in Israel
