= Srigim =

Community settlement in Jerusalem, Israel

Srigim / Li On: שריגים / לי און (Hebrew)
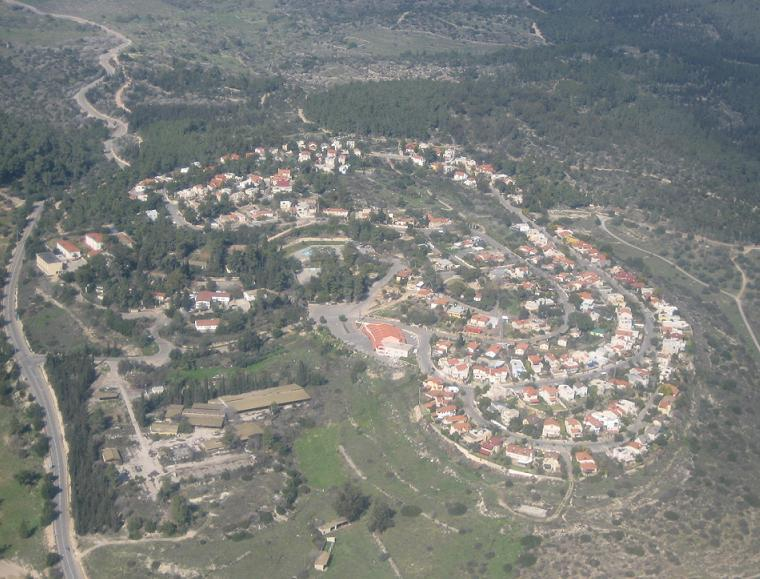

- Location within Jerusalem District
- Coordinates: 31°40′39″N 34°56′7″E
- Country: Israel
- District: Jerusalem
- Council: Mateh Yehuda
- Founded: 1960
- Founder: Moshavniks
- Population (2024): 983

Srigim (Hebrew: שריגים, lit. 'Grapevine tendrils'), also known as Li On (Hebrew: לִי אוֹן), is a community settlement in central Israel. Located to the south of Beit Shemesh. It falls under the jurisdiction of Mateh Yehuda Regional Council. In 2024 it had a population of 983. It borders the British Park forest and the biblical Elah Valley where, in the Bible, David fought Goliath.

== History ==
The village was established in 1960 by residents of moshavim in the region on land had previously belonged to the depopulated Palestinian village of 'Ajjur before the 1948 Arab-Israeli War. The name, which means grapevine tendrils, comes from the Bible: "And in the vine were three branches [שריגים]: and it was as though it budded, and her blossoms shot forth; and the clusters thereof brought forth ripe grapes" (Genesis 40:10).

In 1996 Srigim was enlarged to include 200 families who sought to turn it into an ecological village. It is home to dozens of artists and hosts an arts fair twice a year. It has a boutique winery, a microbrewery and an olive oil mill.

Srigim is the seat of a prominent Israeli legal publisher, Nevo Publishers Ltd. (nevo.co.il), a prime source for Israeli legal information.

== Education ==
Kfar Shimon, a residential and occupational program for autistic adults, is located on the outskirts of Srigim.Kfar Shimon is named for Shimon Sachs, who headed the special education department at Tel Aviv University and founded the Ministry of Education's special education department.

== Notable residents ==
- Benny Morris (born 1948), Israeli historian
- Shani Louk
