= Nirit Ben-Aryeh Debby =

- נירית בן-אריה דבי
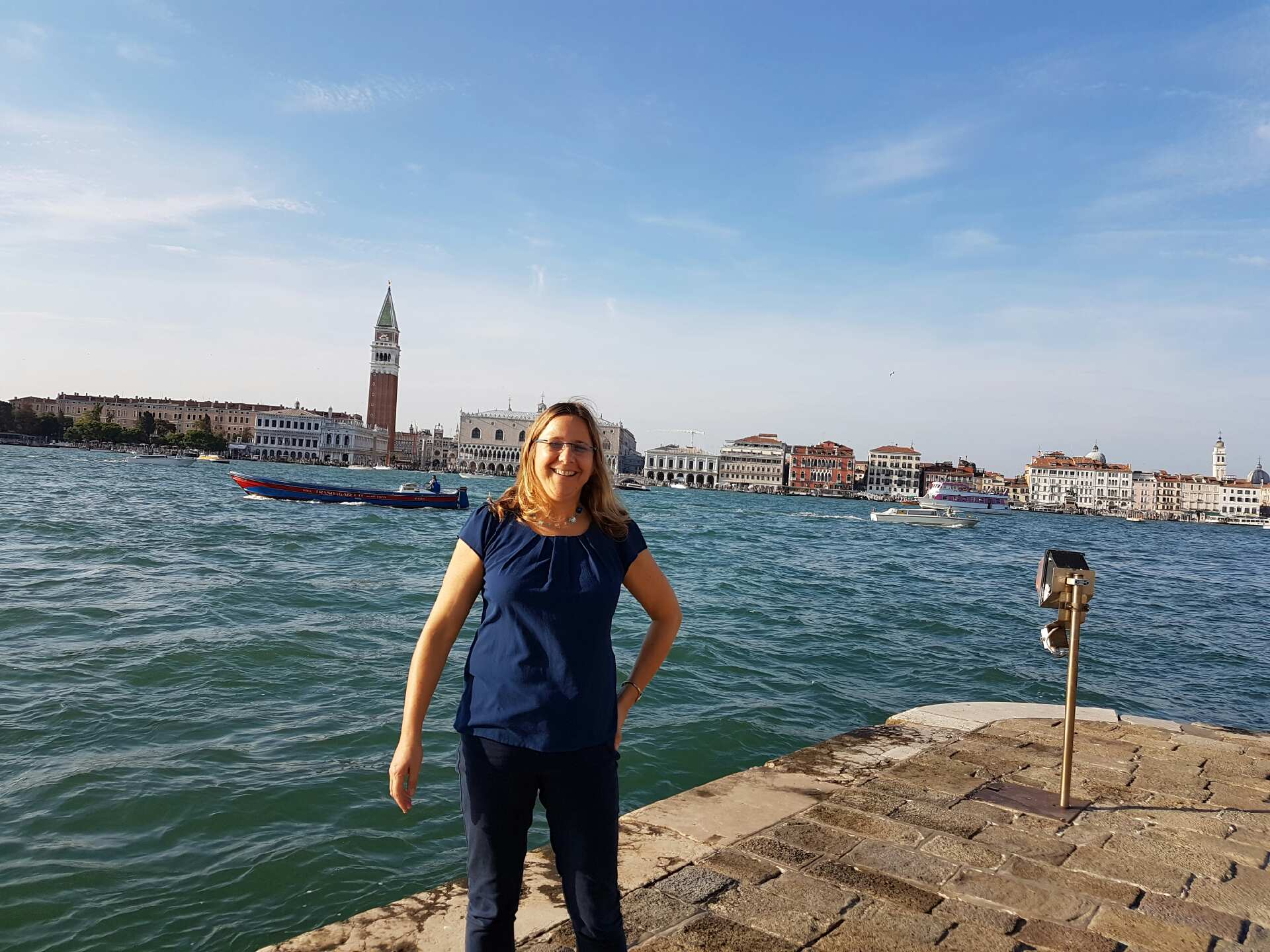
- Born: 1967 (age 58–59); Haifa, Israel
- Citizenship: Israeli
- Scientific career
- Fields: Art History
- Institutions: Ben-Gurion University of the Negev
- Doctoral advisor: Prof. Benjamin Z. Kedar and Prof. Riccardo Fubini
- Website: in.bgu.ac.il/en/humsos/art/Pages/staff/DrNirit%20BenAryeh%20Debby.aspx

Nirit Ben-Aryeh Debby (Hebrew: נירית בן-אריה דבי) is a professor in the Arts Department at Ben-Gurion University of the Negev (BGU) and currently serves as the Chair of the Arts department.

== Published works ==
Ben Aryeh Debby has published numerous scientific papers and has supervised Ph.D. and master's students.

- "Renaissance Florence in the Rhetoric of Two Popular Preachers: Giovanni Dominici (1356-1419) and Bernardino da Siena (1380-1444)" focuses on historical research of Dominican and Franciscan preachers and analyzes sermons. It also includes a large, critical edition of an unpublished manuscript of mendicant sermons.
- "The Renaissance Pulpit: Art and Preaching in Italy, 1400-1550" which appeared in Italian as Il Pulpito Toscano tra 300 e 500. Roma: Istituto Poligrafico e Zecco: 2009, addresses visual material and examines the relationship between preaching and art, i.e., the use of works of art in sermons and the pulpit itself. It examines sculpted marble pulpits from an interdisciplinary perspective focusing on the connections between art, literature and religion.
- "The Cult of St. Clare of Assisi in Early Modern Italy" focuses on the cult of St. Clare of Assisi in visual images and textual sources. This work examines the representations of St Clare in the Italian visual tradition from the thirteenth century on, but especially between the fifteenth and the mid-seventeenth centuries, in the context of mendicant activity. Through an examination of such diverse visual images as prints, drawings, panels, sculptures, minor arts, and frescoes in relation to sermons of Franciscan preachers, the book highlights the cult of women saints and its role in the reform movements of the Osservanza and the Catholic Reformation and in the face of Muslim-Christian encounter of the early modern era. This book appeared in Italian as "L'iconografia di Santa Chiara d'Assisi.
- "Crusade Propaganda in Word and Image in Early Modern Italy: Niccolò Guidalotto’s Panorama of Constantinople" concentrates on a seventeenth-century panorama of Constantinople, which is an exceptional visual representation of the city. This panorama is viewed as an elaborate piece of anti-Ottoman propaganda designed by the Venetian Franciscan friar Niccolò Guidalotto da Mondavio.

Her fifth published book is a collection of essays entitled "Predicatori, artisti e santi nella Toscana del Rinascimento" focusing on art and preaching in Tuscany during the Renaissance.

She is also the editor of two books with Sally Cornelison and Peter Howard "Word, Deed & Image: Mendicant to the World" and with Katrin Kogman Appel and Ingrid Baumgarten "Maps and Travel: Knowledge, Imagination and Visual Culture", forthcoming.
