= Agur, Israel =

Agur: עגור (Hebrew)
- Moshav
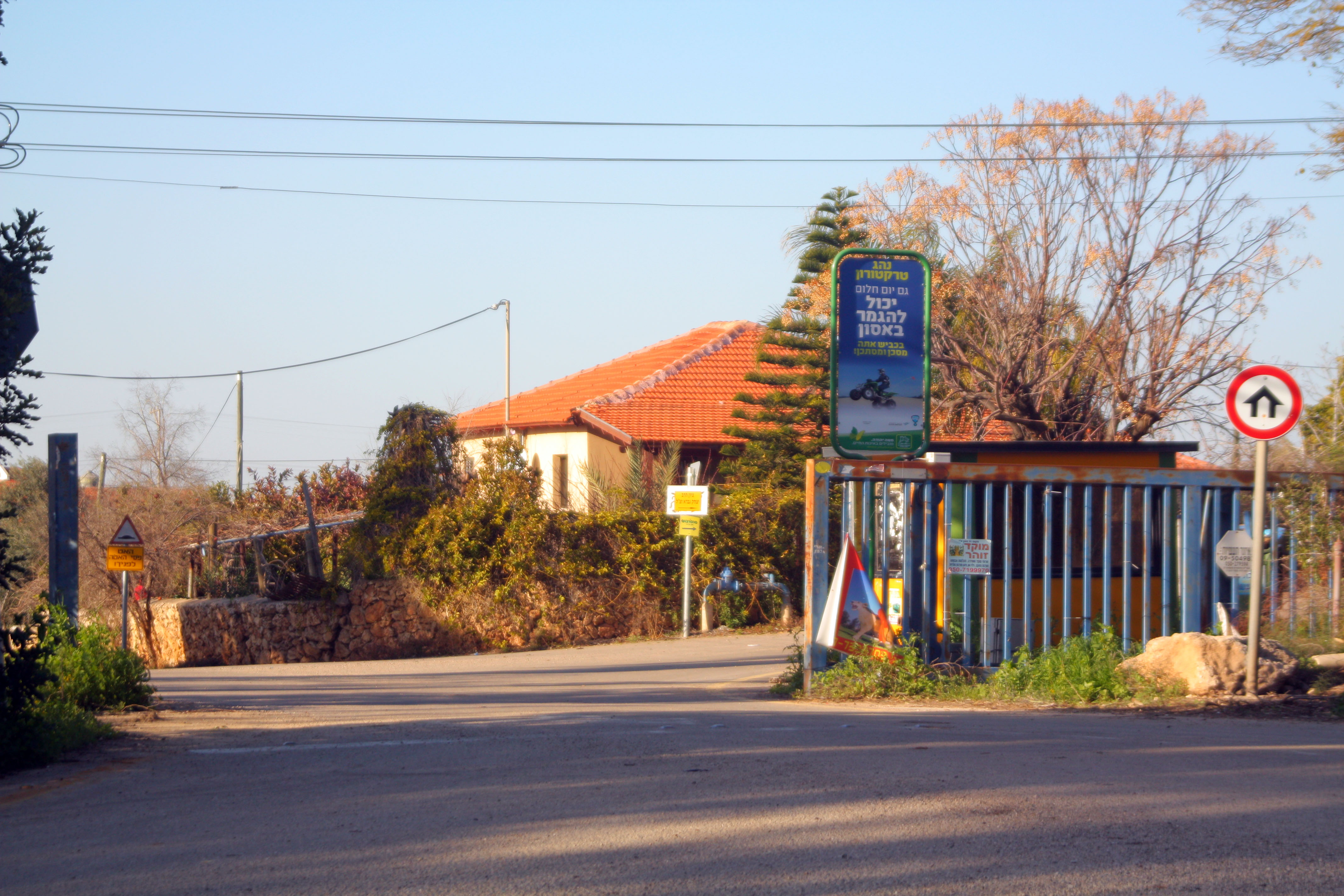

- Location within Jerusalem District
- Coordinates: 31°41′55″N 34°54′39″E
- Country: Israel
- District: Jerusalem
- Council: Mateh Yehuda
- Affiliation: Moshavim Movement
- Founded: 1950
- Founder: Kurdish Jews
- Population (2024): 438

Agur (Hebrew: עָגוּר, lit. 'Crane') is a moshav in central Israel. Located near Beit Shemesh, it falls under the jurisdiction of Mateh Yehuda Regional Council. In 2024 it had a population of 438.

== History ==
The village was established in 1950 by immigrants from Yemen. The chosen site had previously belonged to the Palestinian village of Ajjur, which was occupied and depopulated in October 1948 by the Fourth Battalion of the Giv'ati Brigade as part of Operation Yoav. In 1953 the founders left to establish another moshav, Nahala; Agur was repopulated by immigrants from Northern Kurdistan.

UN investigators visiting Agur following the murder of 2 farm workers

== Economy ==
Agur operates its own winery, producing wine from four blends – blanca, rose, kessem, and special reserve. Grapes from each vineyard in the Judean Mountains are fermented separately before being blended. The owner and founder of the winery is Shuki Yashuv.

== See also ==
- Israeli wine
