= Tel Ira =

Archaeological site in Israel

- Location within Israel
- 31.23252°N 34.98726°E
- Type: tell
- Cultures: Early Bronze III, Iron II, Person, Hellenistic, Early Roman, Byzantine and Early Arab
- Region: Negev

Site notes
- Area: 6 acres (2.4 ha)
- Excavation dates: 1979-1984
- Condition: in ruins
- Website: The Nelson Glueck School of Biblical Archaeology, Tel Aviv University

Tel Ira is an archaeological site in the Negev (Israel), overlooking the Beer Sheva valley. It was occupied in the Early Bronze III, Iron II, Persian, Hellenistic, Early Roman, Byzantine and Early Arab periods. It was first occupied in the 27th century BC. Its ancient/biblical name is unknown.

== Location ==
Tel Ira lies between Beershaba and Tel Arad in the Negev. It is located on a strategic plateau overlooking the Beer Sheva valley. The site is six-acres large.

== History ==
=== Early Bronze III (Stratum IX) ===
The earliest attested layer at Tel Ira dates to the 27th century BC.

=== Iron II (Stratum VIII - Iron IIA-B, Stratum VI-VII - Iron IC) ===
In the late 8th or early 7th century BC, Tel Ira had a city wall 1.6-1.8 m thick. It also had a six-chambered gate and two towers, similar to those found at Gezer, Megiddo and Hazor.

Tel Ira became part of a series of Judahite fortifications against eastern incursions from the Arab desert tribes and Edom. Edomite pottery is found at several sites in the eastern Negev suggesting they gained control over trade routes as Jerusalem fell to the Assyrians in 701 BC.

=== Persian (Stratum V) ===
The region is sparsely populated. The main centers are Beer Sheva and Arad. Tel Ira exist as a small settlement.

=== Byzantine (Stratum II) ===
In the Byzantine period, a large coenobitic monastery was built here and its chapel was dedicated to St. Peter. It was founded in the late fifth or early sixth century and covered an area of around 800 m^{2}. The monastery was part of the nearby settlement but ceased to exist during the Muslim conquest in the mid-seventh century.

== Archaeology ==
The site is about 2.5 hectares in area. Nine archaeological layers have been identified. The site was first surveyed by David Alon in the 1950s. Tel Ira was excavated by Itzhak Beit-Arieh and others from 1979 to 1987.
