= Kudna =

Kudna كُدنة Kidna
- Etymology: Kudna (personal name)
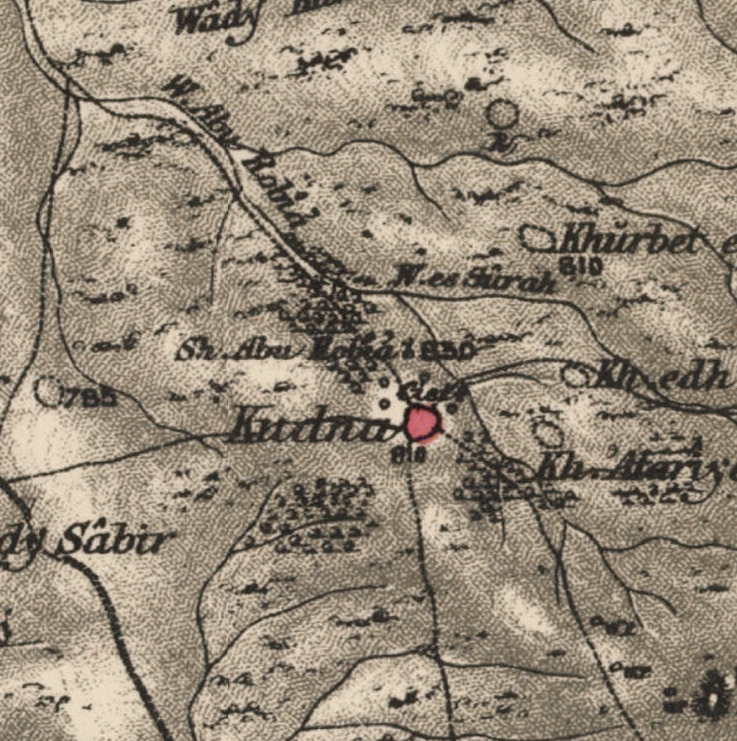
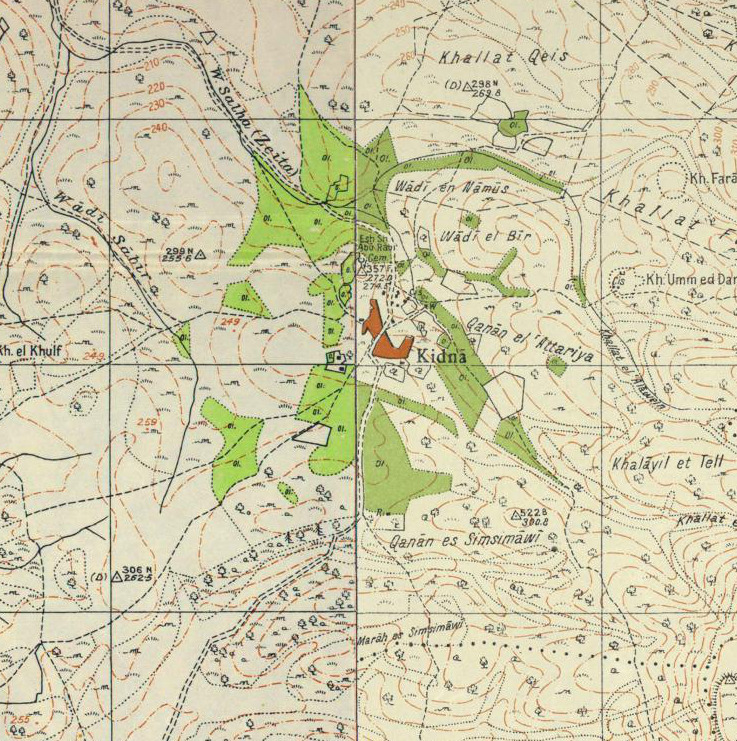
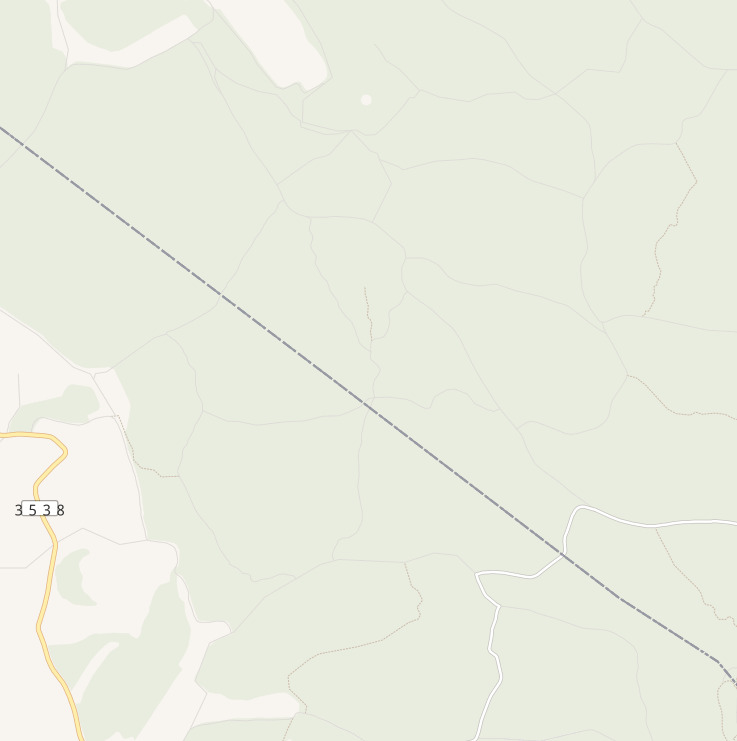
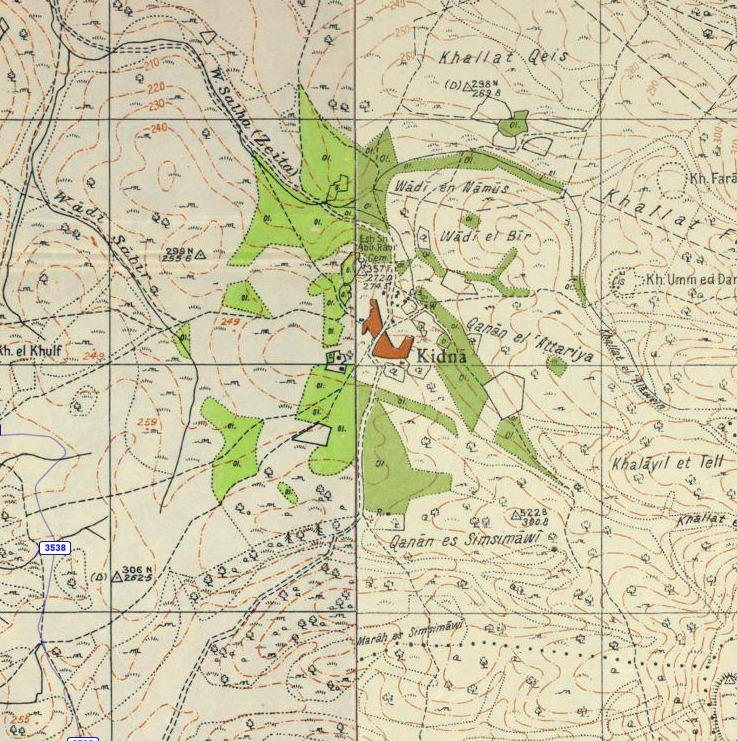
- 1870s map 1940s map modern map 1940s with modern overlay map A series of historical maps of the area around Kudna (click the buttons)

- Location within Mandatory Palestine
- Coordinates: 31°38′42″N 34°53′40″E
- Palestine grid: 140/117
- Geopolitical entity: Mandatory Palestine
- Subdistrict: Hebron
- Date of depopulation: 22-23 October 1948

Area
  - Total: 15,744 dunams (15.744 km^{2}; 6.079 sq mi)

Population (1945)
  - Total: 450
- Cause(s) of depopulation: Military assault by Yishuv forces
- Current Localities: Beit Nir Britannia Park

Kudna (Arabic: كُدنة, also known as Kidna) was a Palestinian Arab village on the northwestern slopes of the Hebron hills, about 25 km from Hebron and at an elevation of 250 m above sea level. Its lands covered 15,744 dunams, including olive groves, cereal fields, and pasture grounds. To its west stretched fertile plains known in Arabic as Sahl Ghazāl, while the southern outskirts contained wooded terrain with wild pistachio and carob trees. Natural springs and cisterns provided water, supplemented by seasonal wadis that traversed the area.

== History ==
Kudna was known to the Crusaders as Kidna. Kudna contains remnants of a fort, the foundations of buildings, previously inhabited caves, and cisterns. About half a dozen khirbas lay in the vicinity. The remains of a fortified building, possibly a hall-house, from the Crusader era is still standing.

=== Ottoman period ===
In 1838, during the rule of the Ottoman Empire, Edward Robinson noted Kudna as a small Muslim village, located in the Gaza district. He also saw the remains of a large ancient building, the western wall was still standing, some 150 ft long (46 m), built of large stones.

In 1863 the French explorer Victor Guérin found Kudna to have five hundred inhabitants. It was located on a hill whose summit was rocky and whose sides were covered with olive and fig trees interspersed with tobacco. On the highest point of the hill were the remains of an old castle, along sixty paces on fifty seven wide. Guérin found the lower courses being ancient, possibly Byzantine; the upper layers more recent.

An Ottoman village list of about 1870 indicated 12 houses and a population of 40, though the population count included men only. In 1883, the PEF's Survey of Western Palestine described Kudna as a small village situated on a low hill and surrounded by olive trees. The walls of a Crusader Castle rose from the middle of the village.

In 1896 the population of Kidna was estimated to be about 228 persons.

=== Families and society ===
The principal clan of Kudna was the al-Shadfān family, which maintained oral histories linking their lineage to the wider Hebron region and recalling episodes of resistance during the Crusader and Ottoman eras. Testimonies collected in the diaspora describe Kudna as socially cohesive, with traditional guest-houses (madāfa) and seasonal festivals tied to the olive harvest.

=== British Mandate era ===
In the 1922 census of Palestine conducted by the British Mandate authorities, Kudna had an entirely Muslim population of 281, increasing in the 1931 census to 353 inhabitants.

In the 1945 statistics the population of Kudna was 450, all Muslims, who owned 15,744 dunams of land according to an official land and population survey. 825 dunams were plantations and irrigable land, 6,505 for cereals, while 15 dunams were built-up (urban) land.

Oral traditions describe that by the 1940s Kudna possessed several shops, an elementary school, and was surrounded by extensive olive groves that formed the economic backbone of the village.

=== 1948, and aftermath ===
During the 1948 Arab-Israeli War, the Israeli forces of the Giv'ati Brigade, commanded by Yigal Allon in Operation Yo'av, assaulted the village on 22 October 1948. Though the village was defended by volunteers from the Arab Liberation Army, the Egyptian Muslim Brotherhood, and local militia men, it was overtaken by the Israeli forces and the village inhabitants fled. Benny Morris reports that Kudna was one of a number of villages, including Zikrin, Ra'na, Deir ad Dabbun and Ajjur, where most of the people fled before the arrival of the Givati Brigade; however those that did remain were expelled eastwards.

Local testimonies record that the final battle for Kudna lasted several hours, with defenders armed with rifles and a few machine guns attempting to hold off armored Israeli units. Oral accounts name at least 17 villagers and volunteers killed in the fighting, including members of the al-Shadfān and Abu ʿAtwan families, who were later commemorated in refugee narratives as the "martyrs of Kudna". Survivors described fleeing at night toward the Hebron hills, carrying children and elderly on donkeys, and eventually reaching the villages of Surif and Dura before dispersing into camps.

Following the war the area was incorporated into the State of Israel and kibbutz Beit Nir was established in 1955 to the west of the village site, on what had been village land. Descendants of Kudna’s families, especially the al-Shadfān, settled in refugee camps such as al-Fawwar and al-ʿArroub, and others migrated to Hebron and Amman.

The Palestinian historian Walid Khalidi described the village remaining structures in 1992: "The houses have been reduced to levelled debris hidden beneath an overgrowth of wild vegetation. One can see the stones that served as fences for home gardens. Cactuses and carob, fig, and olive trees grow on the site."

=== Oral traditions and memory ===
Former residents of Kudna preserved detailed oral histories of their village. Testimonies collected in Jordan and the Hebron area describe the village as a "fortress on the frontier," recalling its Crusader castle ruins as a symbol of resilience. Elders recounted seasonal festivities, including olive harvest celebrations accompanied by traditional songs (ʿatābā and mījanā), and the communal use of a large threshing floor (baydar) at the village entrance.

The memory of 1948 remained central in oral narratives. Women described burning their grain stores before leaving, so that “the enemy would not eat from our bread,” while men recalled vows to return after the fighting subsided. In the refugee camps, the story of Kudna was transmitted through family gatherings, storytelling, and annual commemorations. The al-Shadfān family compiled genealogies linking present-day descendants in Palestine and Jordan to their ancestral lands.

Kudna has remained a reference point in Palestinian collective memory. Refugee associations in Hebron and Amman commemorate the village through oral heritage projects, publications, and cultural festivals. Diaspora members have also preserved documents such as land deeds and photographs, which are used in claims of ownership and in community heritage work. Today, the ruins of the Crusader fortress, alongside fig, carob, and cactus groves, stand as markers of the destroyed village, while the lands form part of Britannia Park in modern Israel.

== Bibliography ==
- Barron, J.B., ed. (1923). Palestine: Report and General Abstracts of the Census of 1922. Government of Palestine.
- Conder, C.R.; Kitchener, H.H. (1883). The Survey of Western Palestine: Memoirs of the Topography, Orography, Hydrography, and Archaeology. Vol. 3. London: Committee of the Palestine Exploration Fund.
- Department of Statistics (1945). Village Statistics, April, 1945. Government of Palestine.
- Guérin, V. (1869). Description Géographique Historique et Archéologique de la Palestine (in French). Vol. 1: Judee, pt. 2. Paris: L'Imprimerie Nationale.
- Hadawi, S. (1970). Village Statistics of 1945: A Classification of Land and Area ownership in Palestine. Palestine Liberation Organization Research Center.
- Khalidi, W. (1992). All That Remains: The Palestinian Villages Occupied and Depopulated by Israel in 1948. Washington D.C.: Institute for Palestine Studies. ISBN 0-88728-224-5.
- Hartmann, M. (1883). "Die Ortschaftenliste des Liwa Jerusalem in dem türkischen Staatskalender für Syrien auf das Jahr 1288 der Flucht (1871)". Zeitschrift des Deutschen Palästina-Vereins. 6: 102–149.
- Mills, E., ed. (1932). Census of Palestine 1931. Population of Villages, Towns and Administrative Areas. Jerusalem: Government of Palestine.
- Morris, B. (2004). The Birth of the Palestinian Refugee Problem Revisited. Cambridge University Press. ISBN 978-0-521-00967-6.
- Palmer, E.H. (1881). The Survey of Western Palestine: Arabic and English Name Lists Collected During the Survey by Lieutenants Conder and Kitchener, R. E. Transliterated and Explained by E.H. Palmer. Committee of the Palestine Exploration Fund.
- Pringle, D. (1997). Secular buildings in the Crusader Kingdom of Jerusalem: an archaeological Gazetter. Cambridge University Press. ISBN 0521-46010-7.
- Robinson, E.; Smith, E. (1841). Biblical Researches in Palestine, Mount Sinai and Arabia Petraea: A Journal of Travels in the year 1838. Vol. 2. Boston: Crocker & Brewster.
- Robinson, E.; Smith, E. (1841). Biblical Researches in Palestine, Mount Sinai and Arabia Petraea: A Journal of Travels in the year 1838. Vol. 3. Boston: Crocker & Brewster.
- al-Shadfān, Ziyād Muḥammad ʿAbd al-Fattāḥ (2025). Kudna, Āl al-Shadfān: al-Waṭan wa-l-Judhūr [كُدنا، آل الشدفان: الوطن والجذور]. Amman: Author. (Jordanian National Library legal deposit no. 2025/4/2124).
- Schick, C. (1896). "Zur Einwohnerzahl des Bezirks Jerusalem". Zeitschrift des Deutschen Palästina-Vereins. 19: 120–127.
- Socin, A. (1879). "Alphabetisches Verzeichniss von Ortschaften des Paschalik Jerusalem". Zeitschrift des Deutschen Palästina-Vereins. 2: 135–163.
- Warren, C.; Conder, C.R. (1884). The Survey of Western Palestine: Jerusalem. London: Committee of the Palestine Exploration Fund.
