= Zikrin =

Zikrin ذكرين Dhikerin
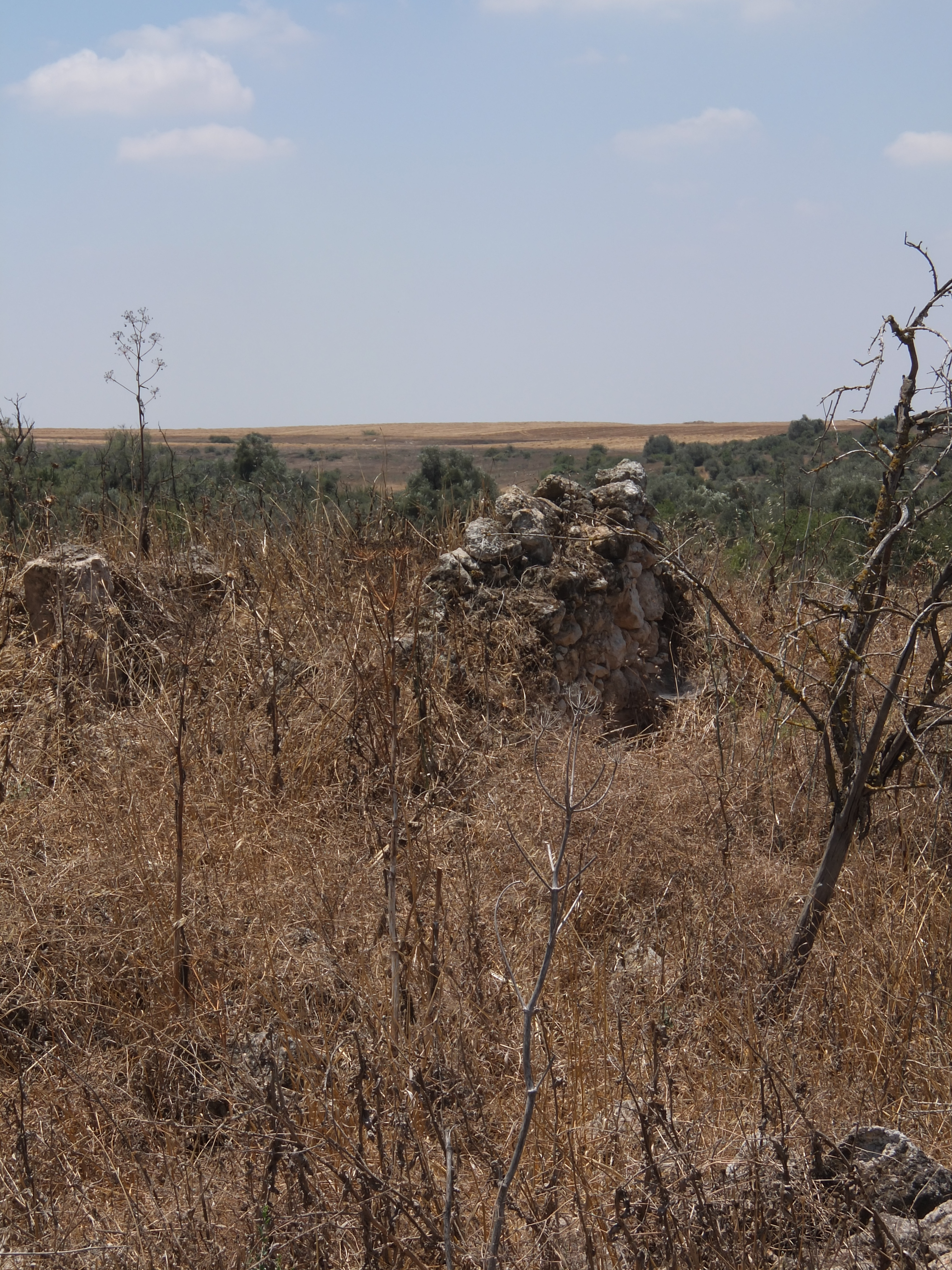
- Façade of ruined house in Khirbet Dhikrin
- Etymology: Dhikerin el Baradan; Dhikerin the cool
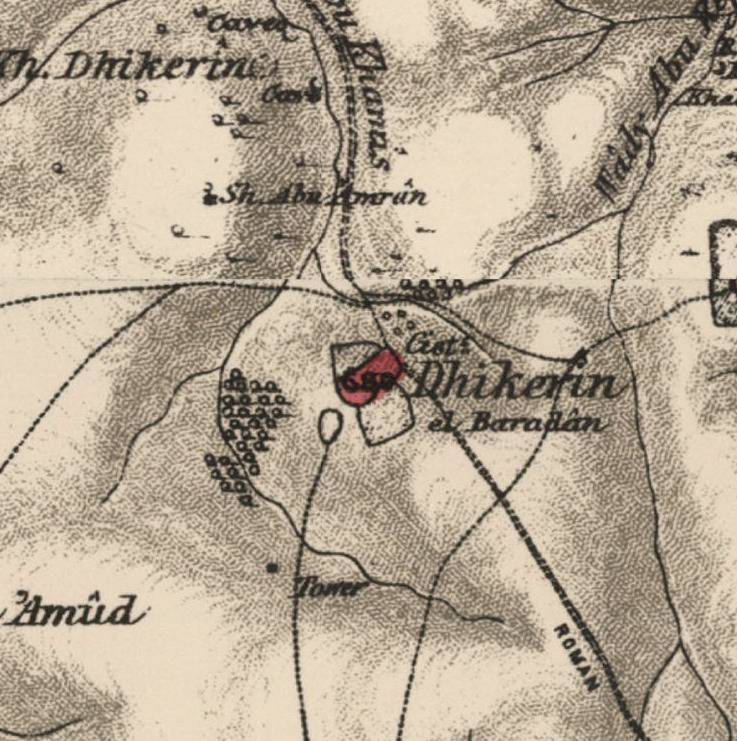
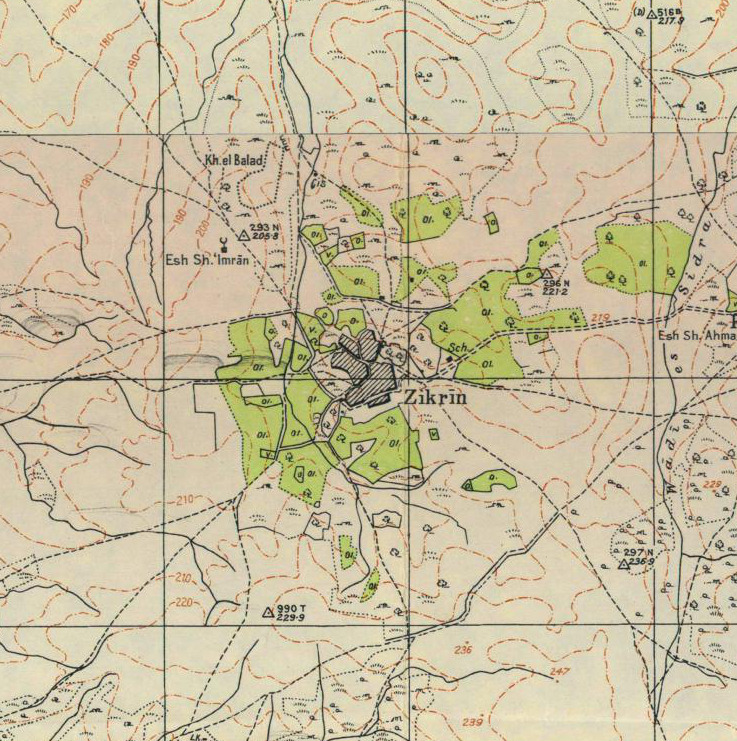
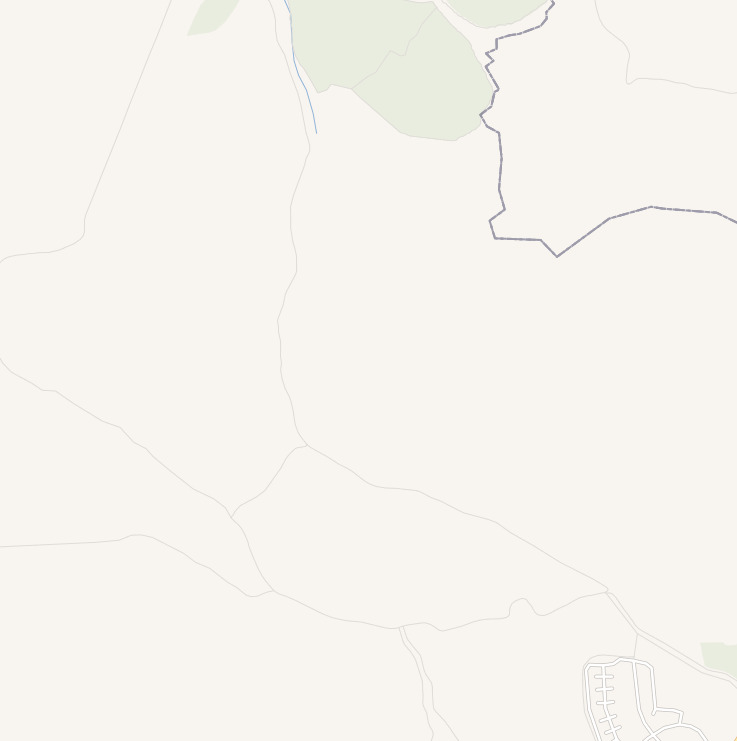
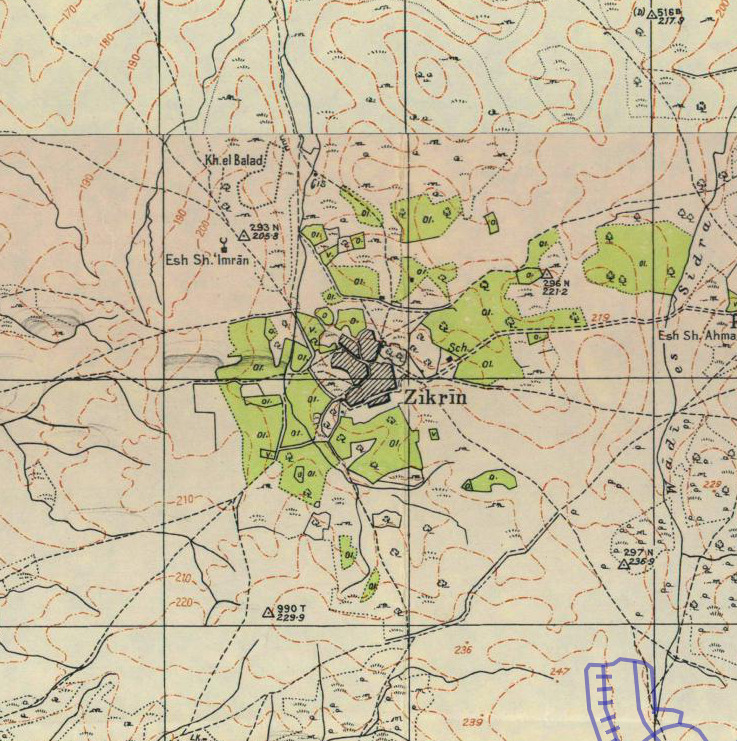
- 1870s map 1940s map modern map 1940s with modern overlay map A series of historical maps of the area around Zikrin (click the buttons)

- Location within Mandatory Palestine
- Coordinates: 31°39′48″N 34°51′38″E
- Palestine grid: 136/119
- Geopolitical entity: Mandatory Palestine
- Subdistrict: Hebron
- Date of depopulation: 22–23 October 1948

Area
  - Total: 17,195 dunams (17.195 km^{2}; 6.639 sq mi)

Population (1945)
  - Total: 960
- Cause(s) of depopulation: Military assault by Yishuv forces

Zikrin (Arabic: ذكرين), pronounced Dhikrin, was a Palestinian Arab village in the Hebron Subdistrict, depopulated in the 1948 Palestine War. The site is located about 6 kilometres (3.7 mi) northwest of Beit Gubrin and sits at a mean elevation of 212 metres (696 ft) above sea-level, its access somewhat impeded by hedges of buckthorn and cactus. The entire site is dotted with grottoes and caves, and razed structures.

== History ==
The village was called Kefar Dikrina in Roman times. Geographer, Adolf Neubauer mentions the village as formerly being called Kefar Dhikrin (Hebrew: כפר דכרין) in several Rabbinic sources, including the Babylonian Talmud. Neubauer cites one of the sources, saying that the village's name is derived from the fact that the womenfolk of the village bear only male children (hence, dikhra = male). According to Lamentations Rabbah, the region of Kefar Dhikrin was one of the most densely populated areas of the country at that time. These sources mostly date back to the 3rd and 4th centuries CE.

In 1479, it was mentioned by Tucher of Nurnberg, who travelled from Bethlehem to Gaza and lodged at Zikrin. He noted cisterns here.

=== Ottoman era ===
In 1596, Zikrin was part of the Ottoman Empire, a nahiya (subdistrict) of Gaza under the Gaza Sanjak, with a population of 40 Muslim households, an estimated 220 persons. They paid a fixed tax rate of 25% on several products, including wheat, barley, sesame and fruits, and vineyards; a total of 8,000 akçe.

In 1838, Edward Robinson described Dhikrin as a "large" Muslim village, located in the Gaza district.

In 1863 Victor Guérin visited, and found here a village with about 600 inhabitants. On the west side of the village, there were as many as 40 cisterns. Guérin toured the village with the village Sheikh, whom he described as a "tall, young and intelligent" man, whose father was the Sheikh of Bayt Jibrin, and whose uncles were the same in Tell es-Safi and 'Ajjur. Socin found from an Ottoman village list of about 1870 that Zikrin had 38 houses and a population of 101, though the population count included men, only. Hartmann found that Zikrin had 60 houses.

In 1883, the PEF's Survey of Western Palestine described Zikrin as being a stone village with gardens and "numerous" water wells.

In 1896 the population of Dikrin was estimated to be about 609 persons.

=== British Mandate era ===
In the 1922 census of Palestine conducted by the British Mandate authorities, Zekrin had a population of 693, all Muslims, increasing in the 1931 census to 726, still all Muslim, in a total of 181 houses.

The modern village had an elementary school and a few shops. The villagers, who were Muslim, were farmers.

In 1945 statistics, it had a population of 960, all Muslims, and a total land area of 17,195 dunams. In 1944/45, 15,058 dunams (15.058 km^{2}; 5.814 sq mi) of village land was planted with cereals, while 63 dunams were built-up (urban) areas.

=== 1948 and aftermath ===
On 6 August 1948, in the middle of the official Second truce, two squads from the 53rd Battalion of the Givati Brigade raided Zikrin, lobbing grenades and torching three or four houses. About 10 adult men, two children, and one woman were killed in the village, according to IDF sources. The last three were killed accidentally, according to the report, while the IDF suffered one soldier "slightly injured."

Zikrin was finally depopulated on 22–23 October 1948 during the third stage of Operation Yoav under the command of Yigal Allon. According to Morris, most of the villagers fled before the troops arrived, those who remained were expelled eastwards. According to Morris, Yigal Allon was so successful in completely driving out the local population during Operation Yo'av, that the villagers found it almost impossible to "reinfiltrate" to their old villages, as there was no longer any local Arab population to help them resettle. During a military "sweep" of the villages in early 1949, they found most villages empty. In Zikrin it is reported that the troops found "two Arabs" who "managed to escape."

Following the war, the area was incorporated into the State of Israel and the land that had belonged to the village was left undeveloped. Kibbutz Beit Nir is about 3 km south of the village site.

The Palestinian historian Walid Khalidi described the village site in 1992 as being "overgrown with tall weeds, scrub, and other wild vegetation, containing several olive and carob trees. Truncated stone terraces, partially overgrown with cactuses, further marked the site. Some of the surrounding lands were cultivated by Israeli farmers for wheat, and the rest was used as rangeland."

== Gallery ==
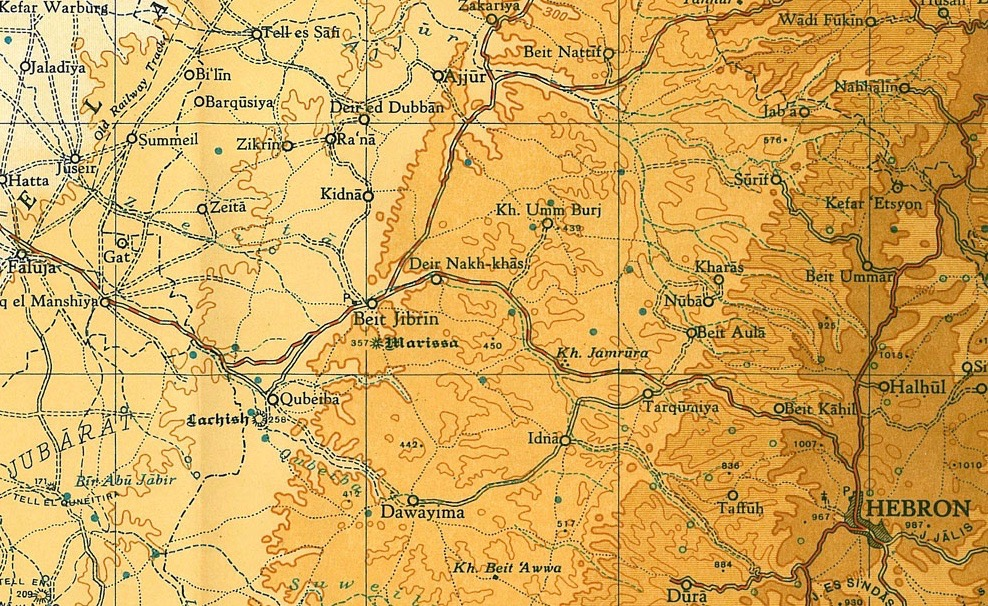
Zikrin map, 1948 1:250,000 (top left quadrant)

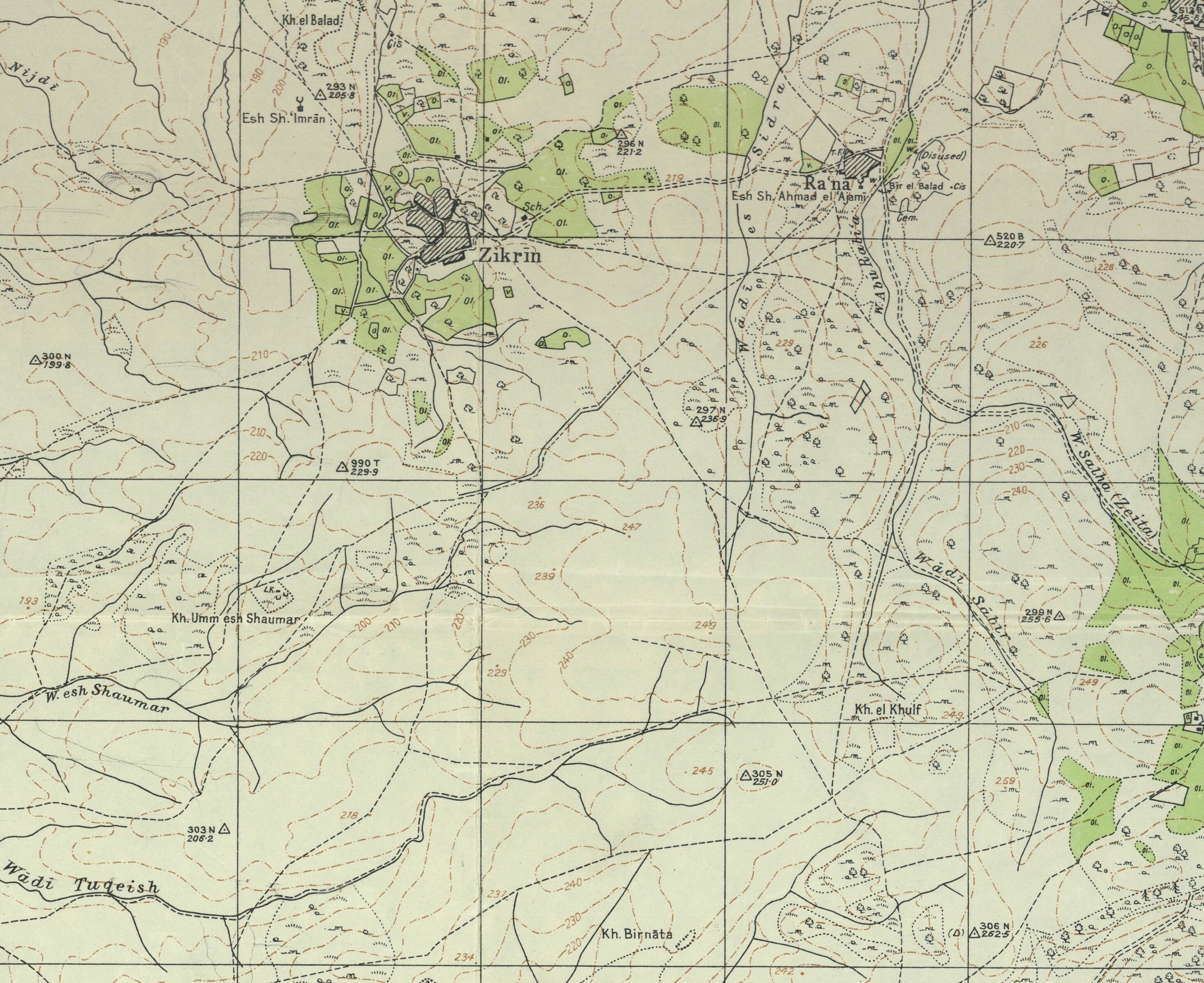
Zikrin map, 1948 1:20,000

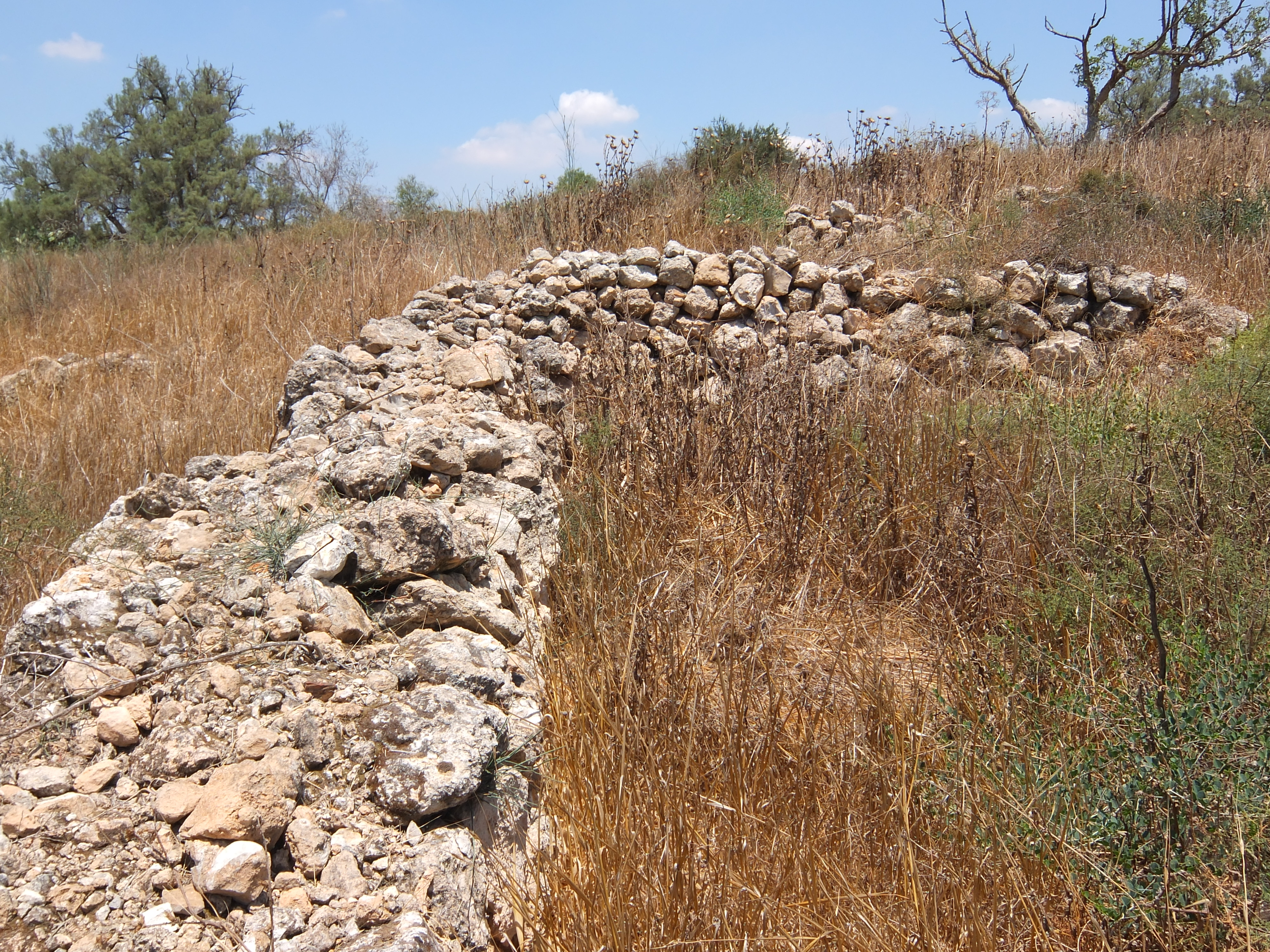
Old wall near Khirbet Dhikrin

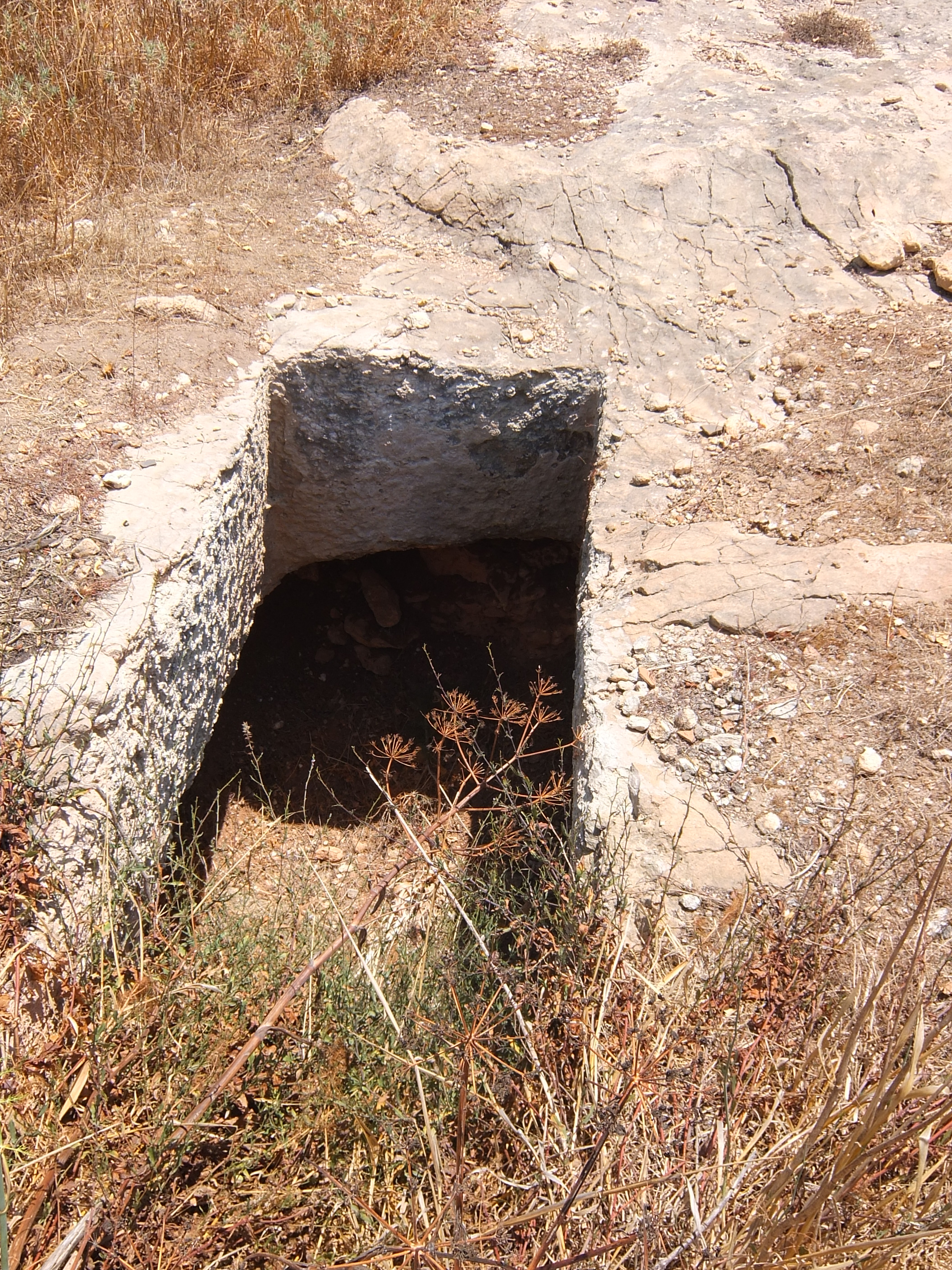
Quarried rock in Kh. Dhikrin

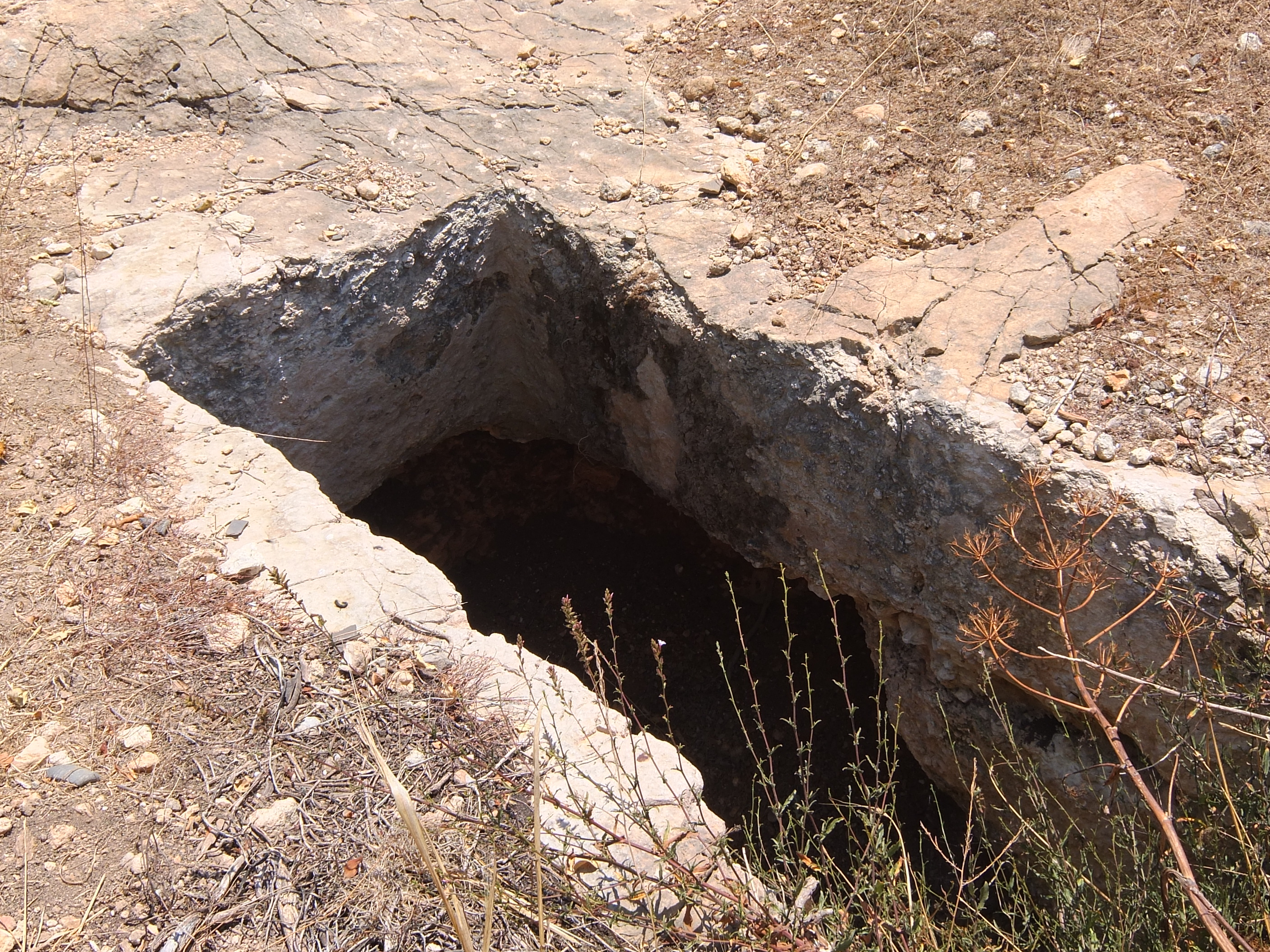
Quarried rock

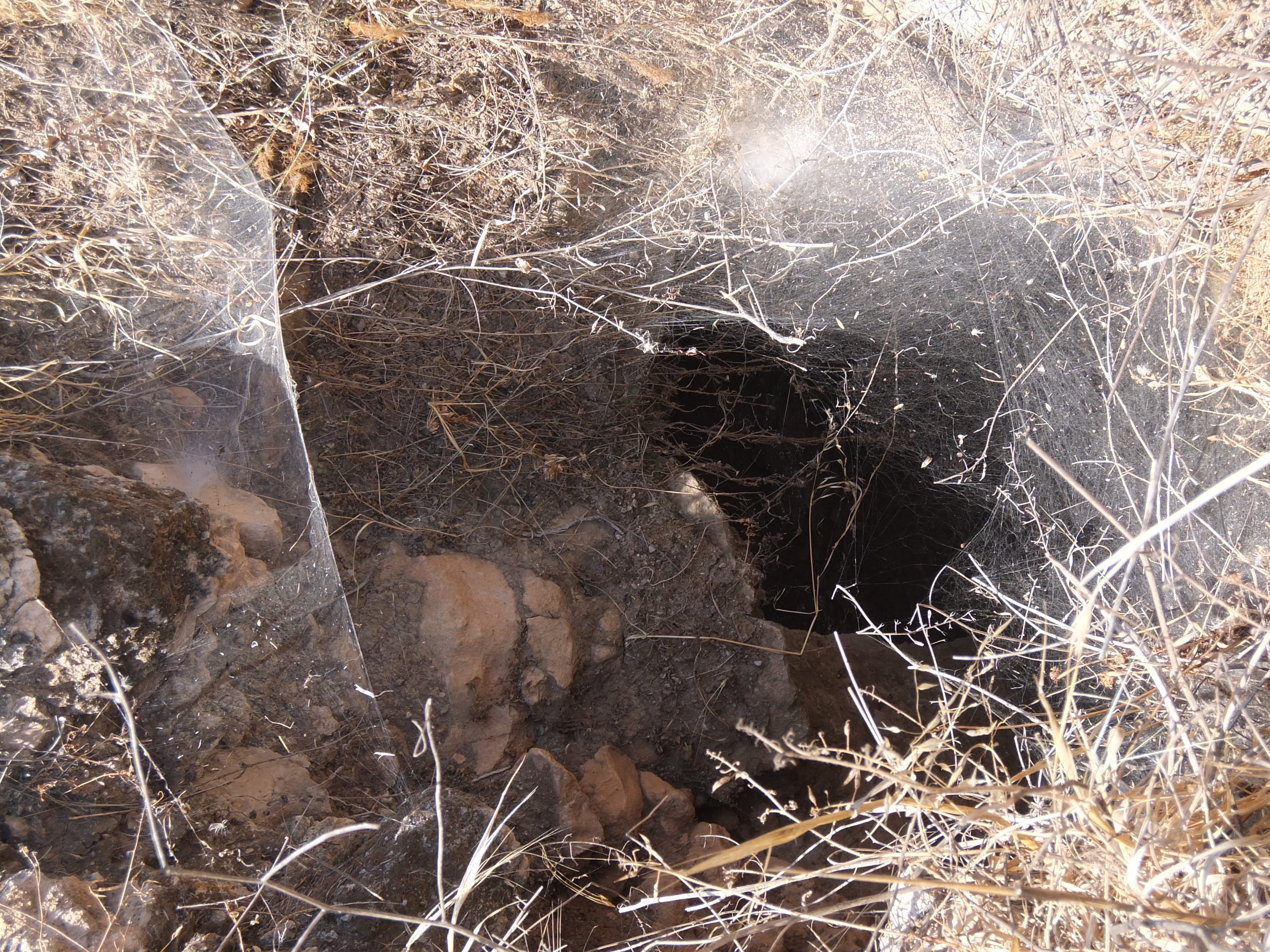
Entrance to cave in Kh. Dhikrin

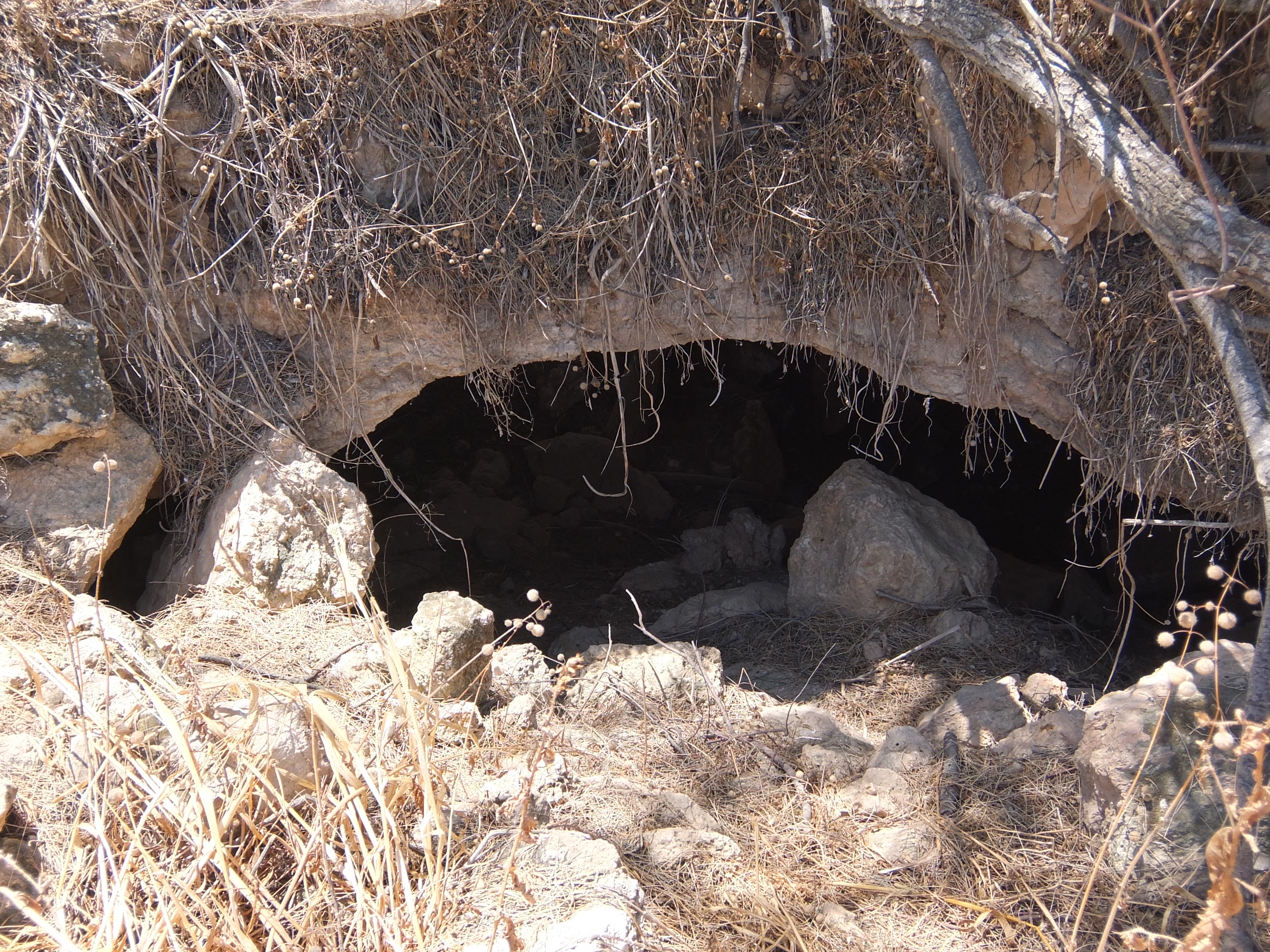
Cave at Kh. Dhikrin

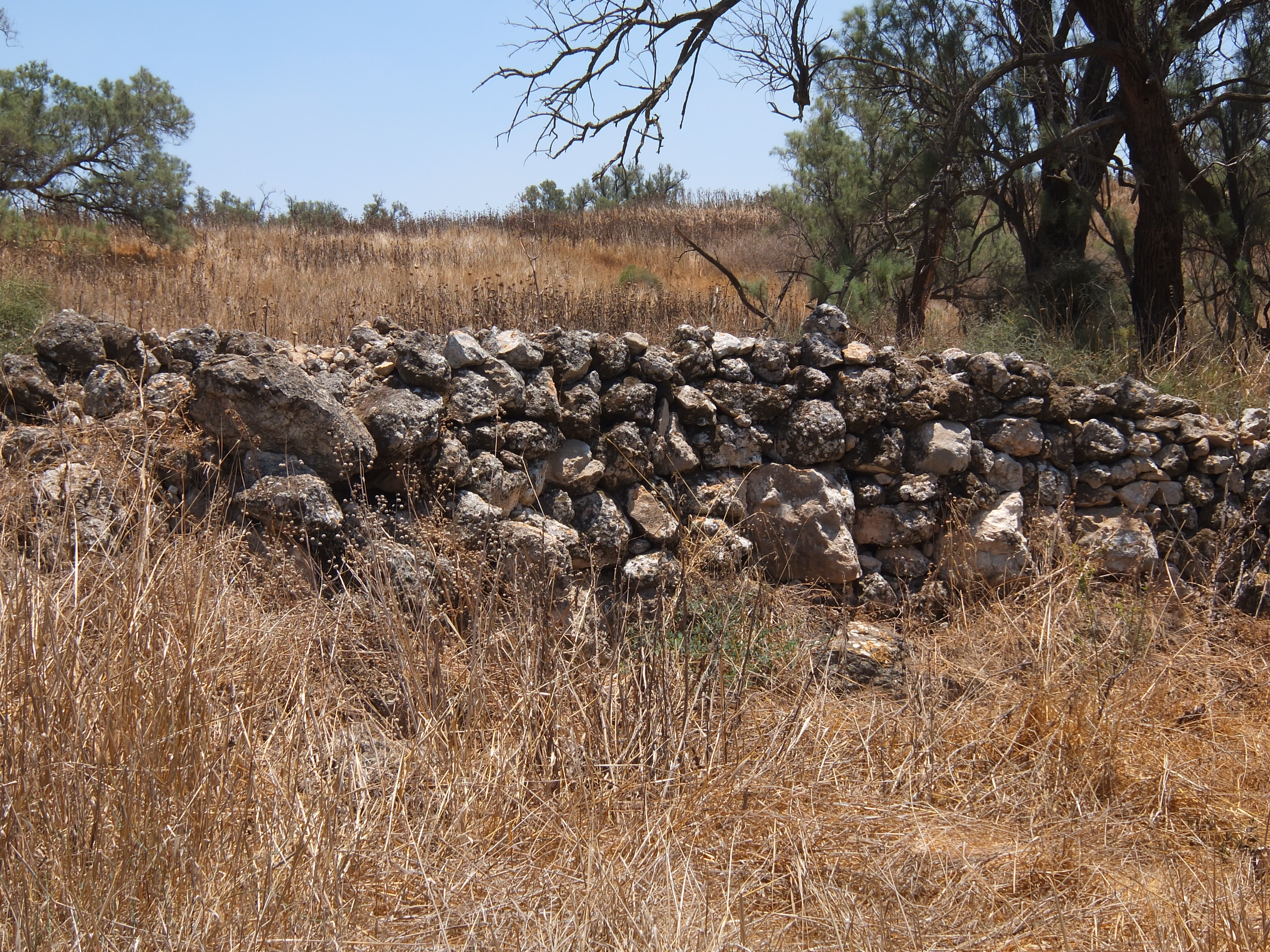
Old wall in Kh. Dhikrin

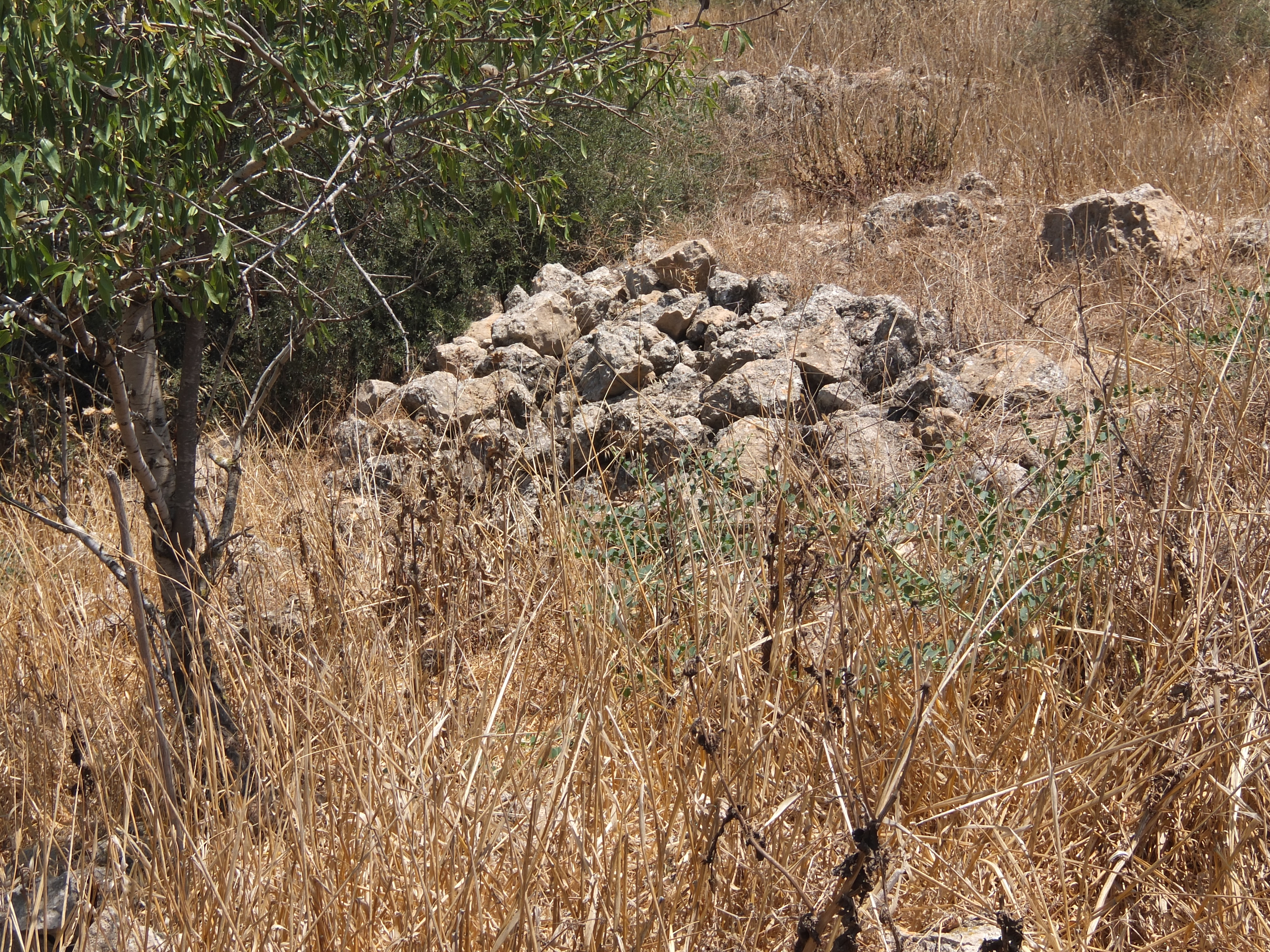
Razed structure in Kh. Dhikrin

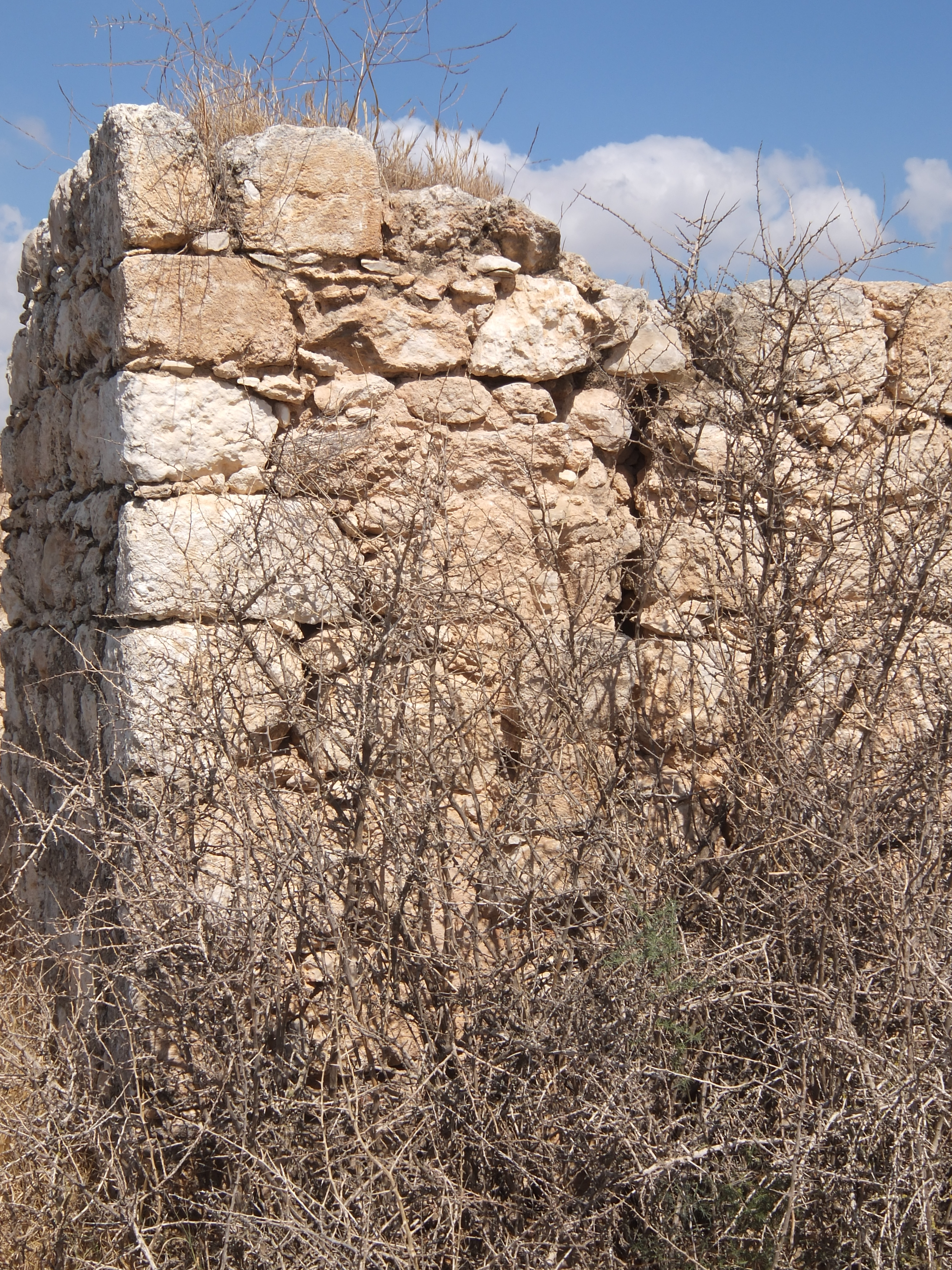
Tomb of Sheikh Abu 'Imran, on hill west of Dhikrin

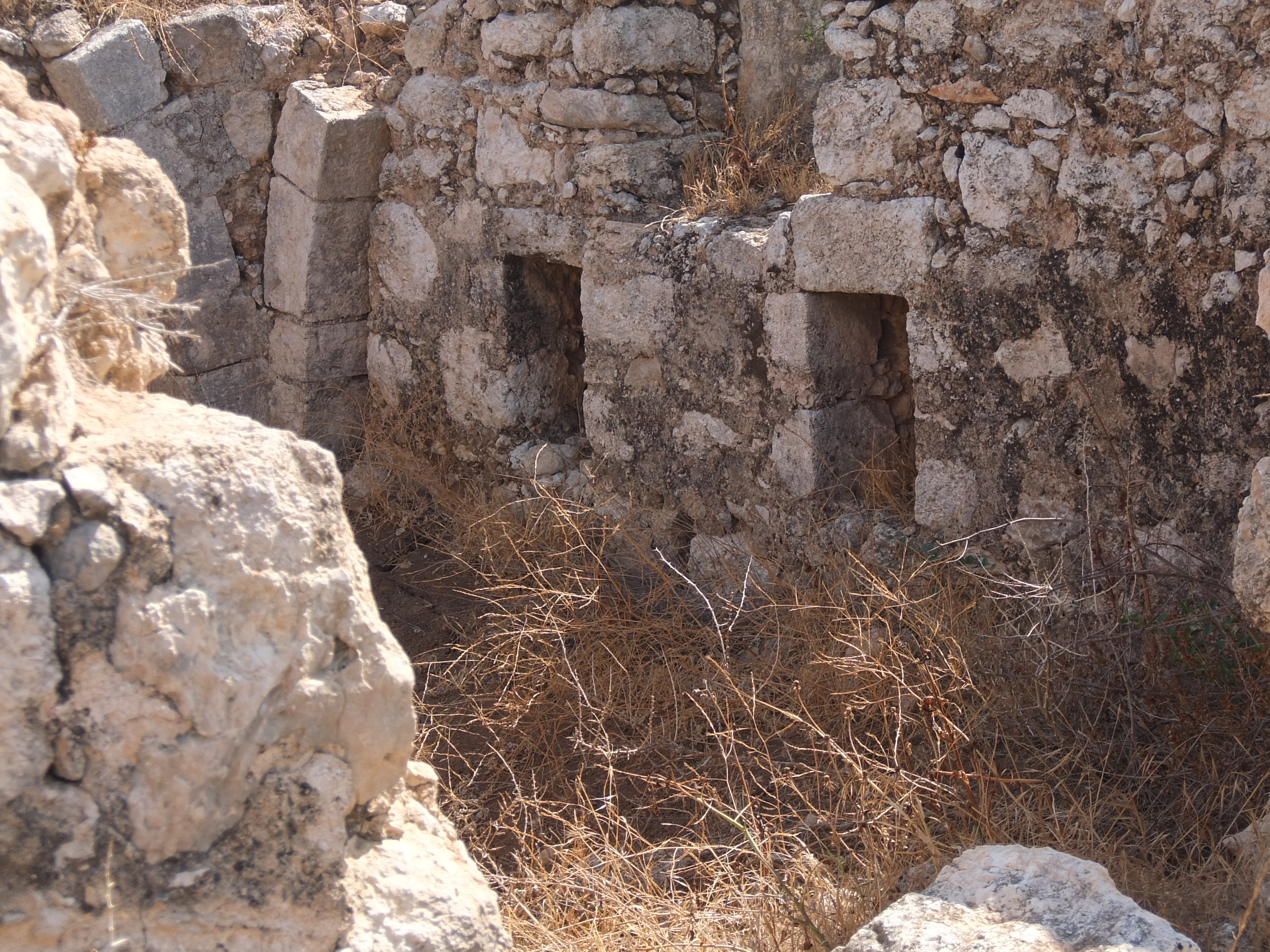
Interior of tomb of Sheikh Abu 'Imran, on hilltop west of Dhikrin

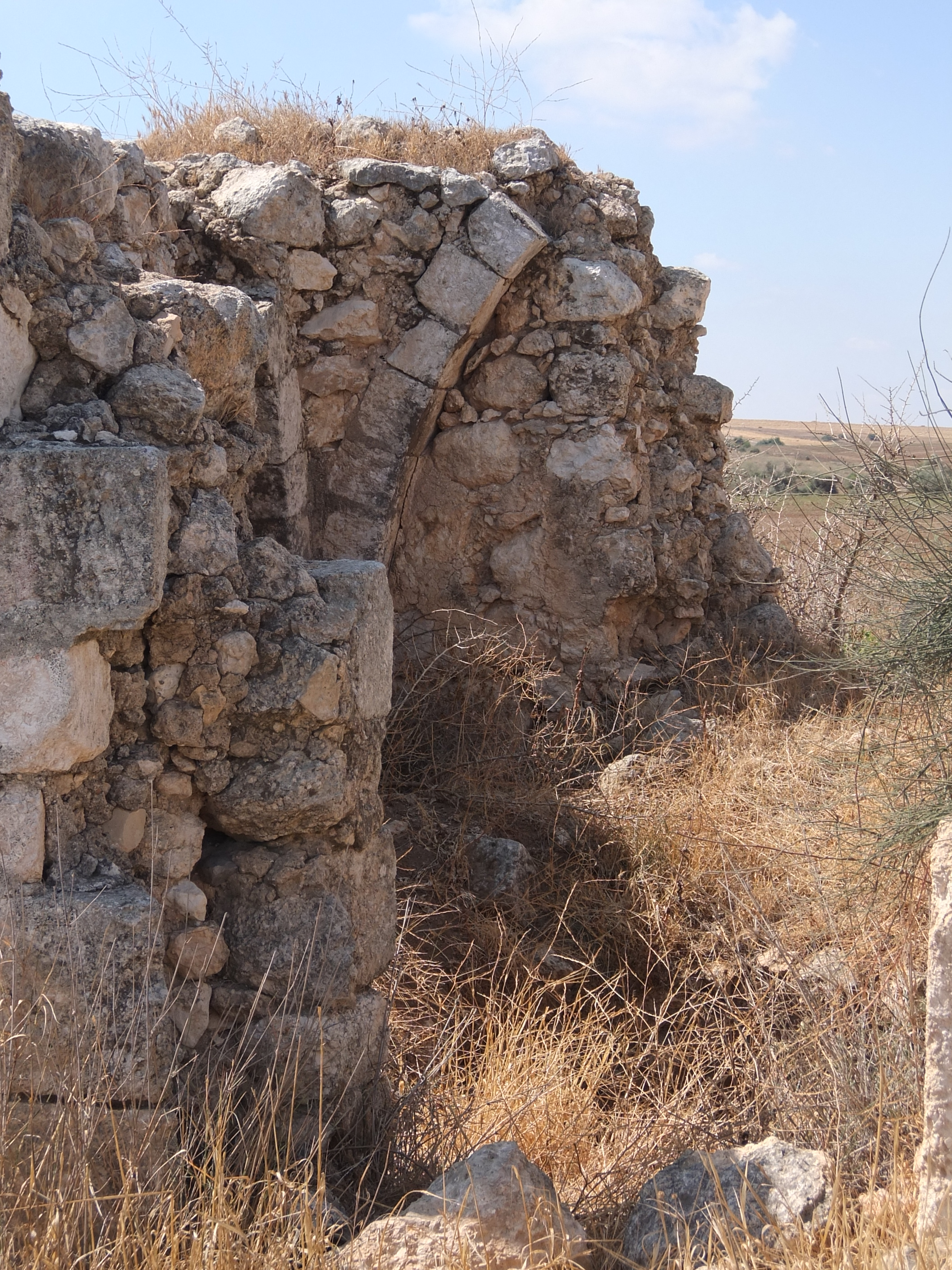
Tomb of Sheikh Abu 'Imran, on hill west of Dhikrin

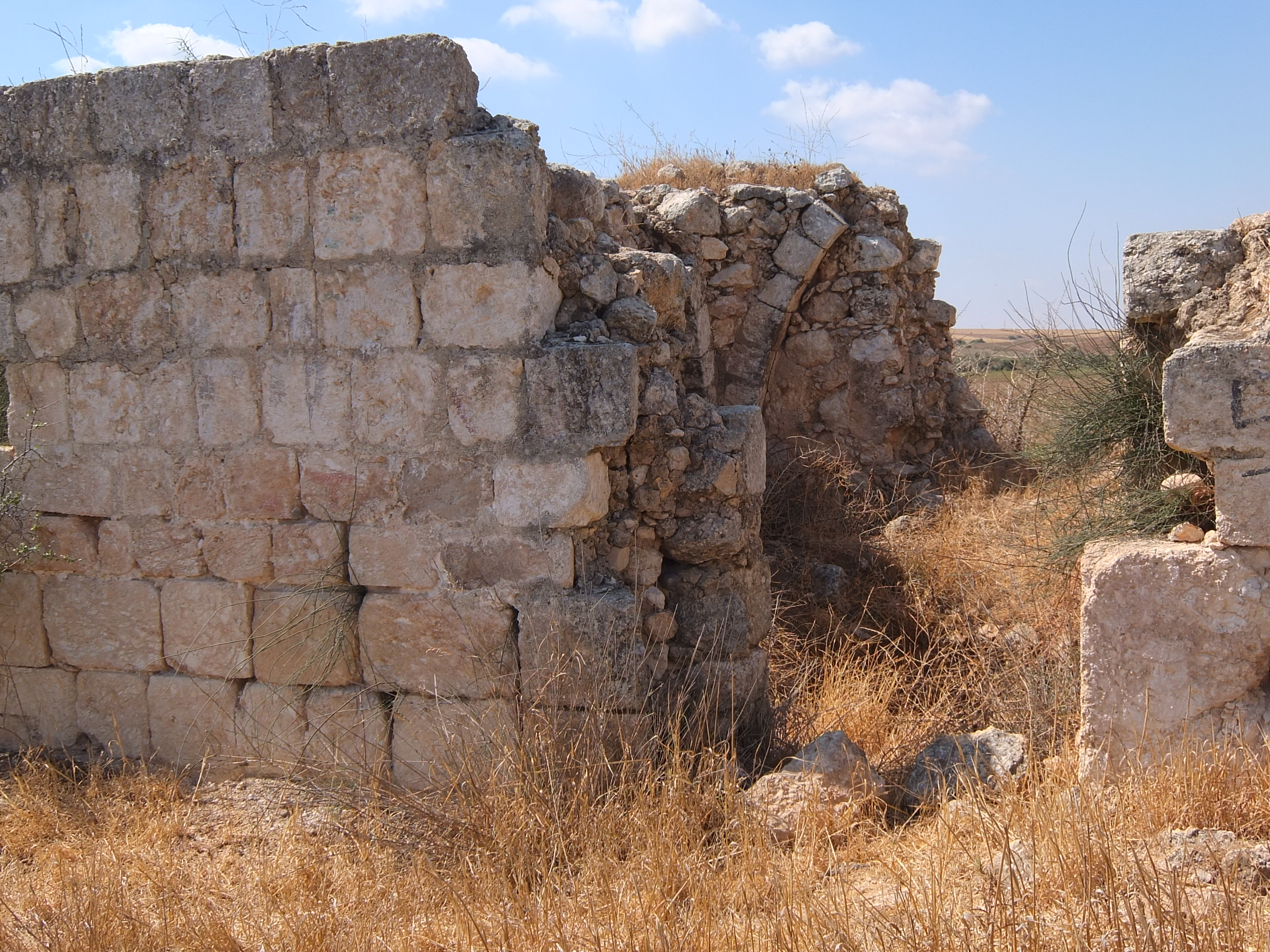
Tomb of Sheikh Abu 'Imran

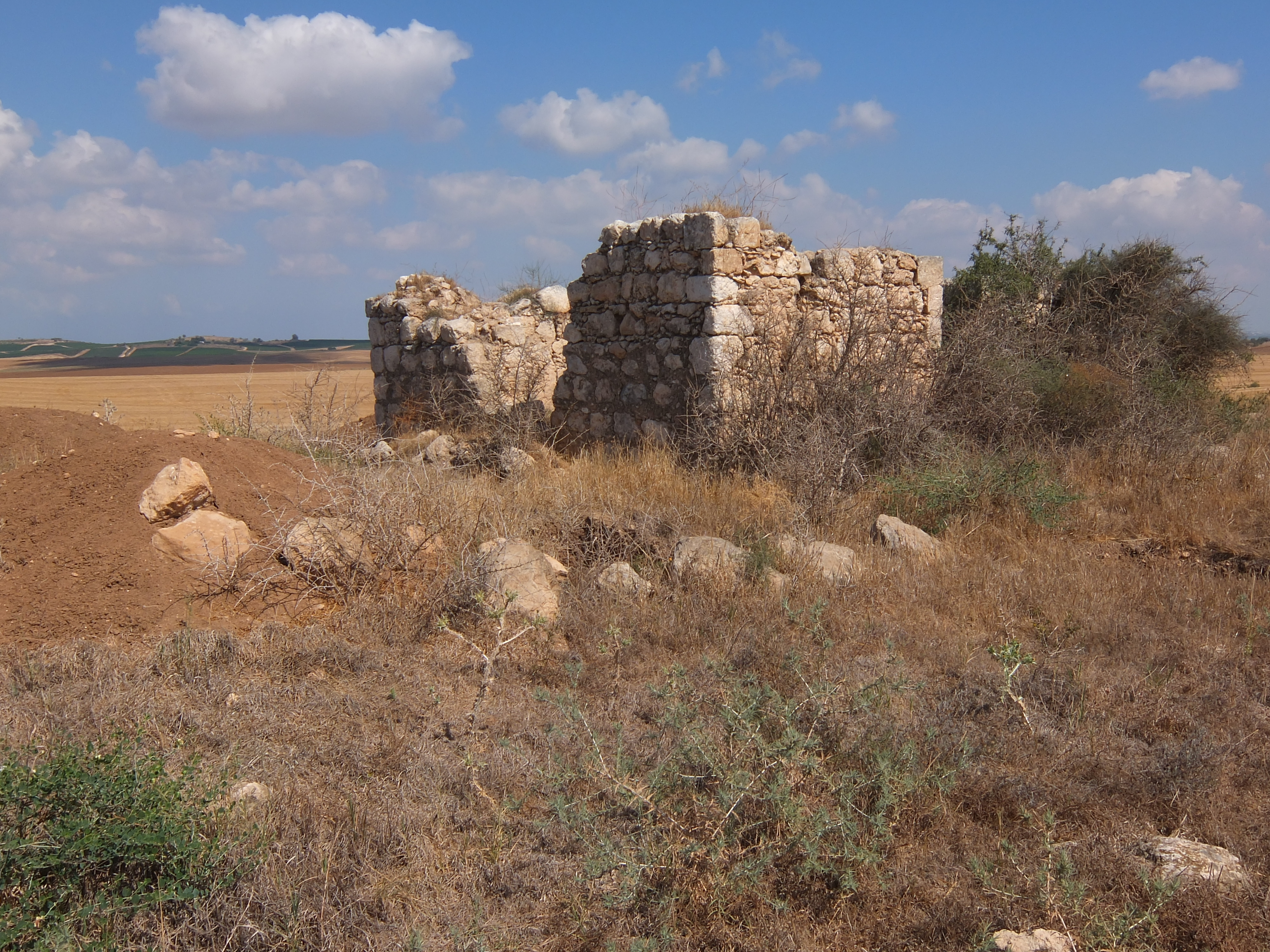
Tomb of Sheikh Abu 'Imran

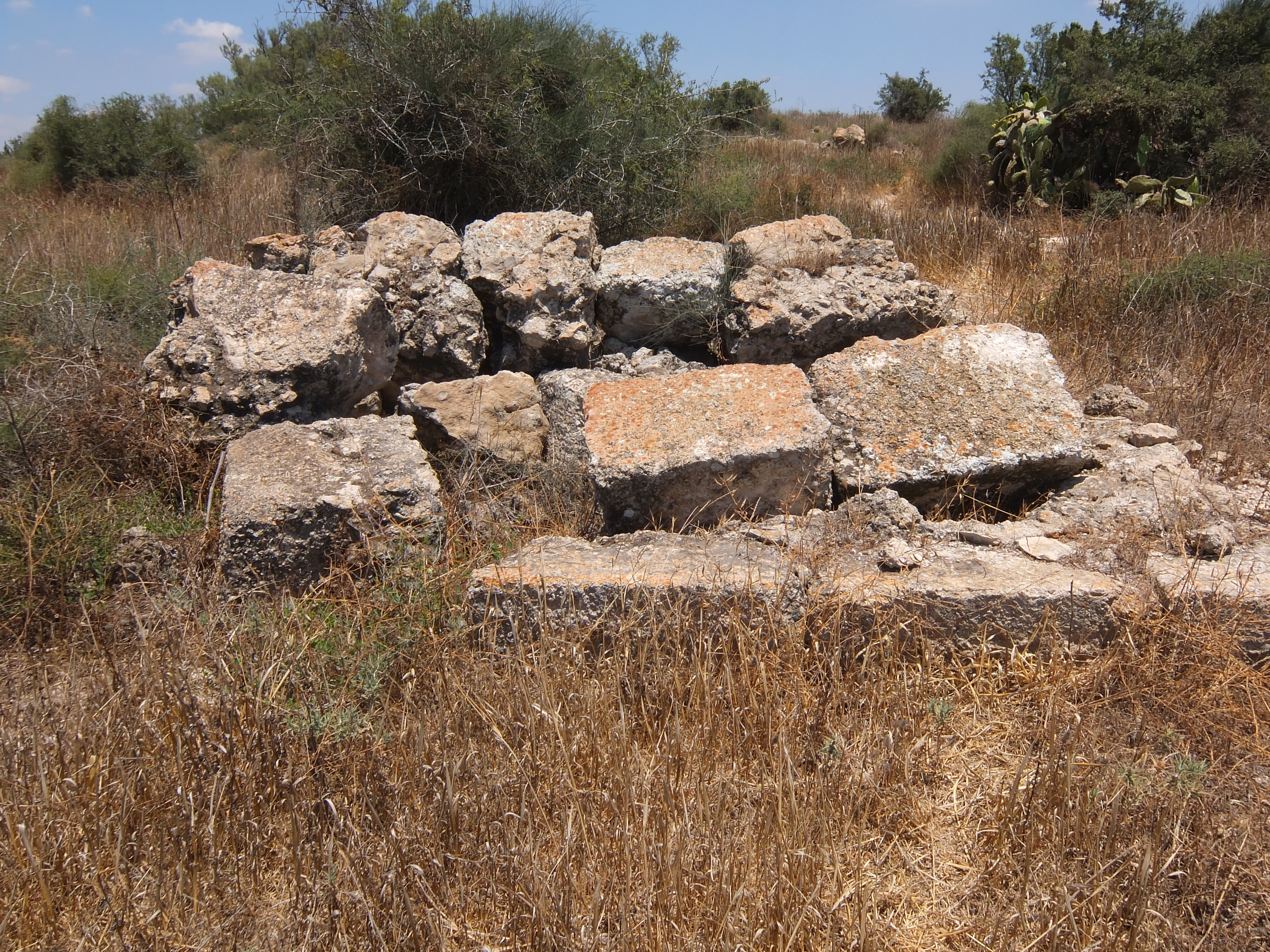
Ruined tower south of Dhikrin, mentioned in SWP map number 20

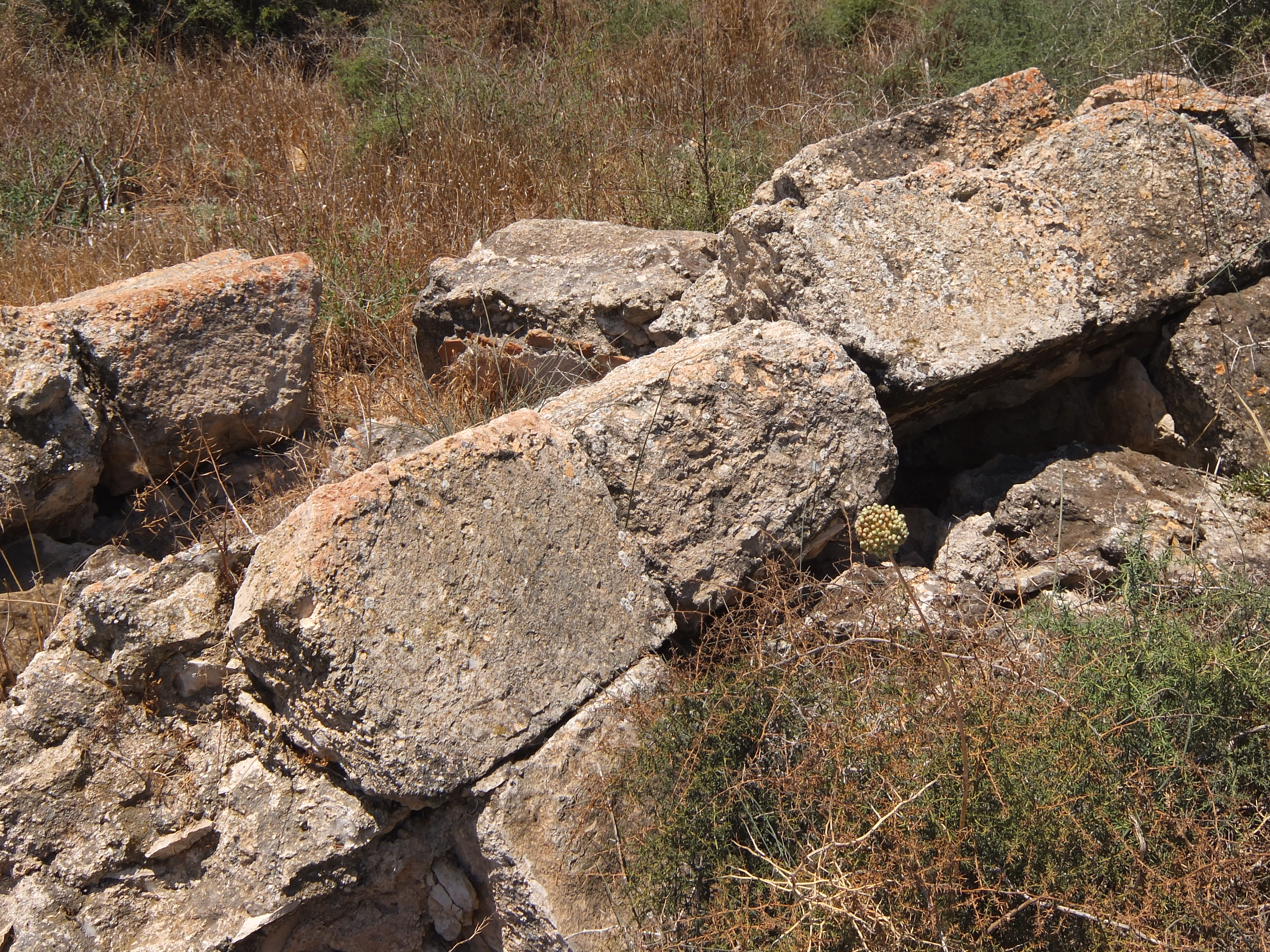
Ruined tower south of Dhikrin, mentioned in SWP map number 20

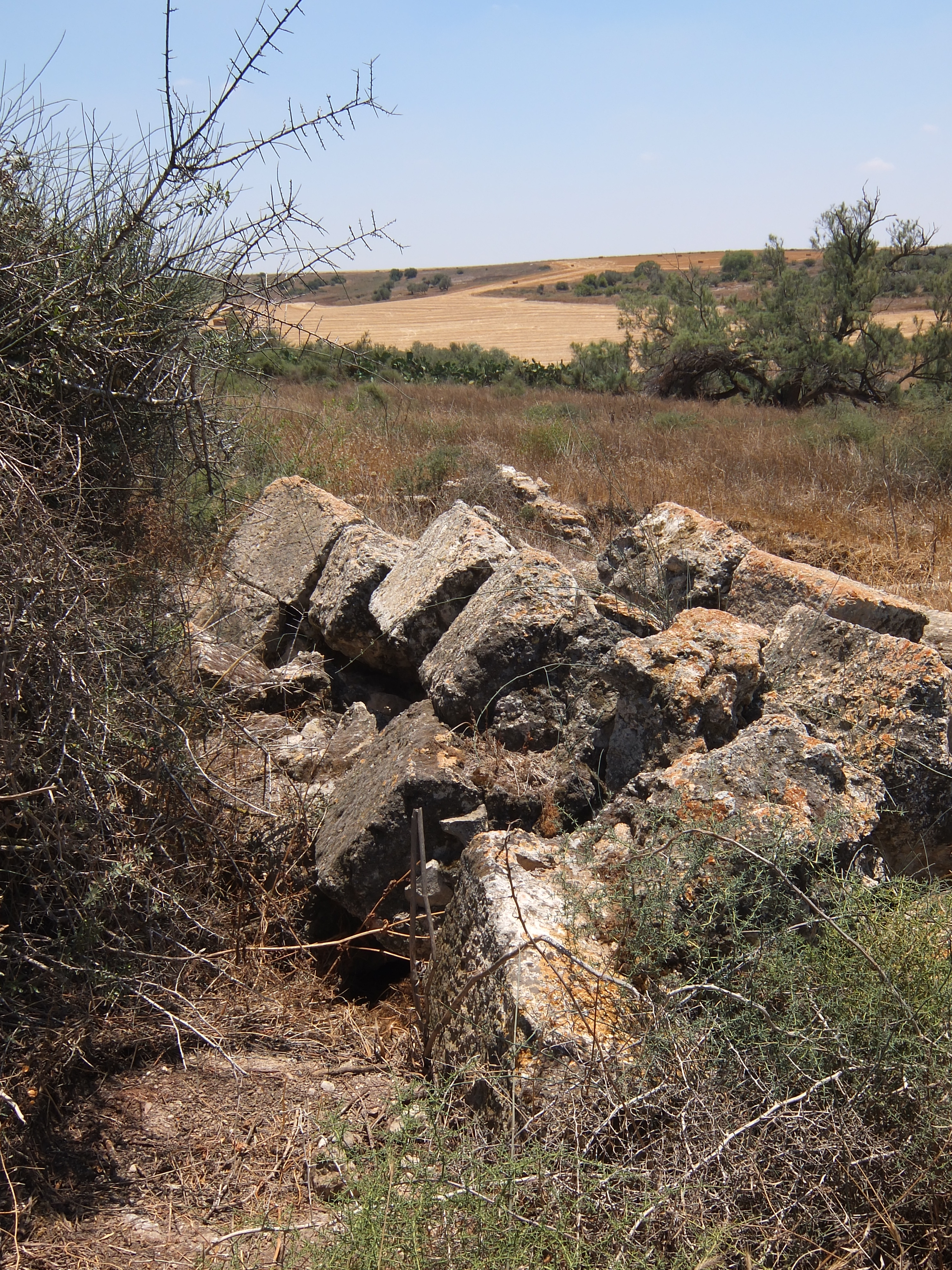
View of what remains of tower

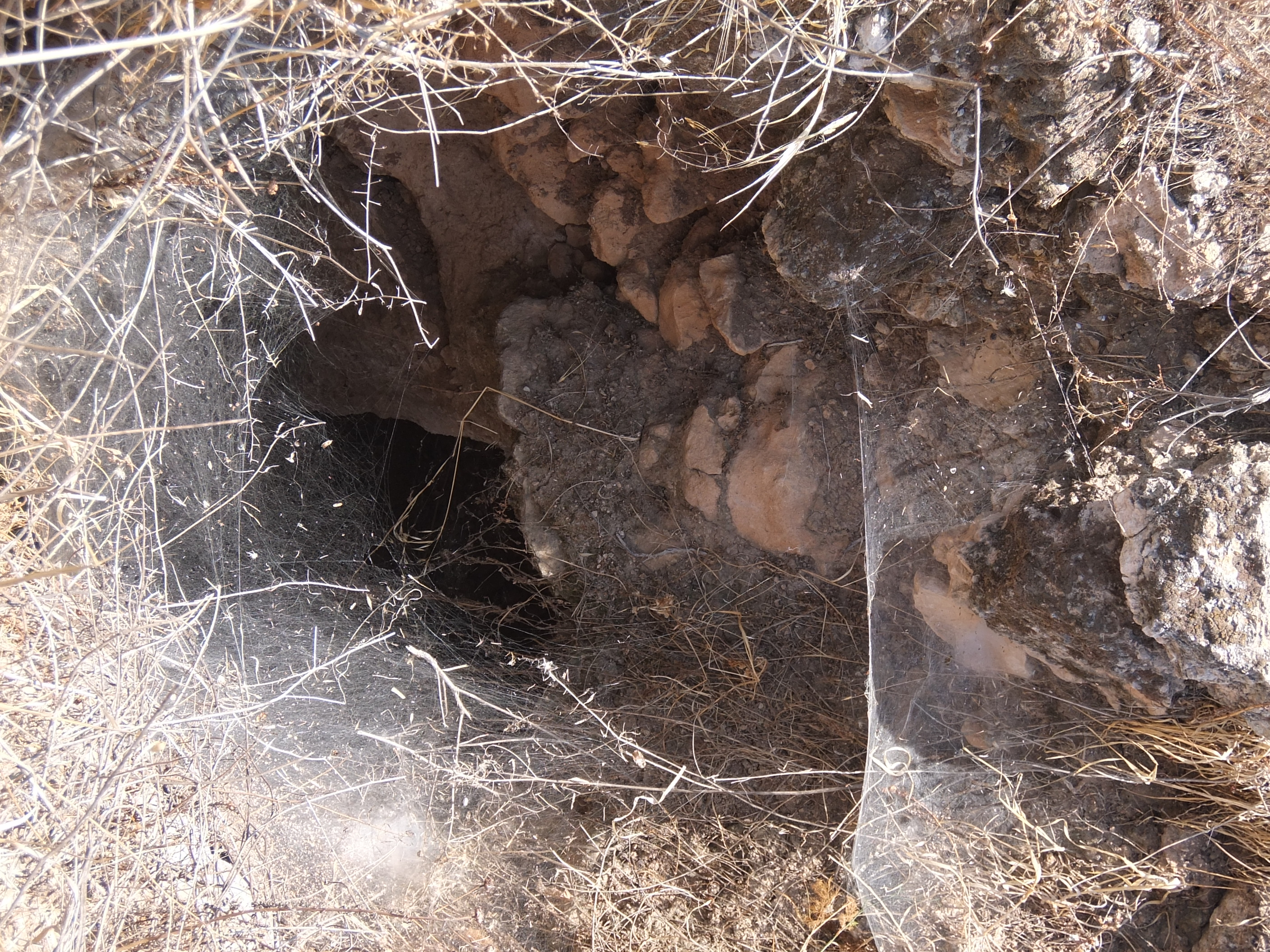
Cobwebs block entrance to cave in Kh. Dhikrin

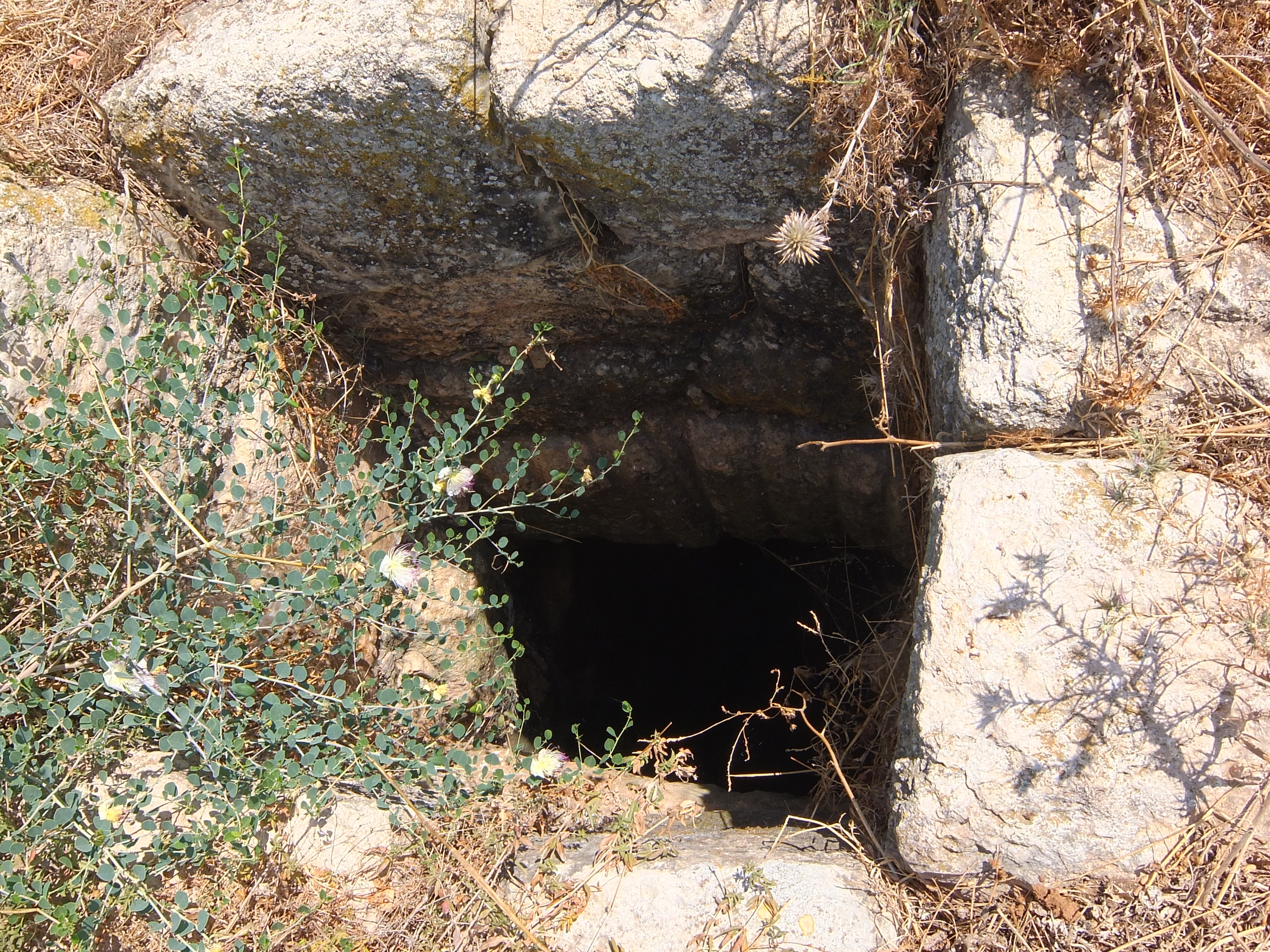
Mouth of deep well, in dale northwest of Dhikrin

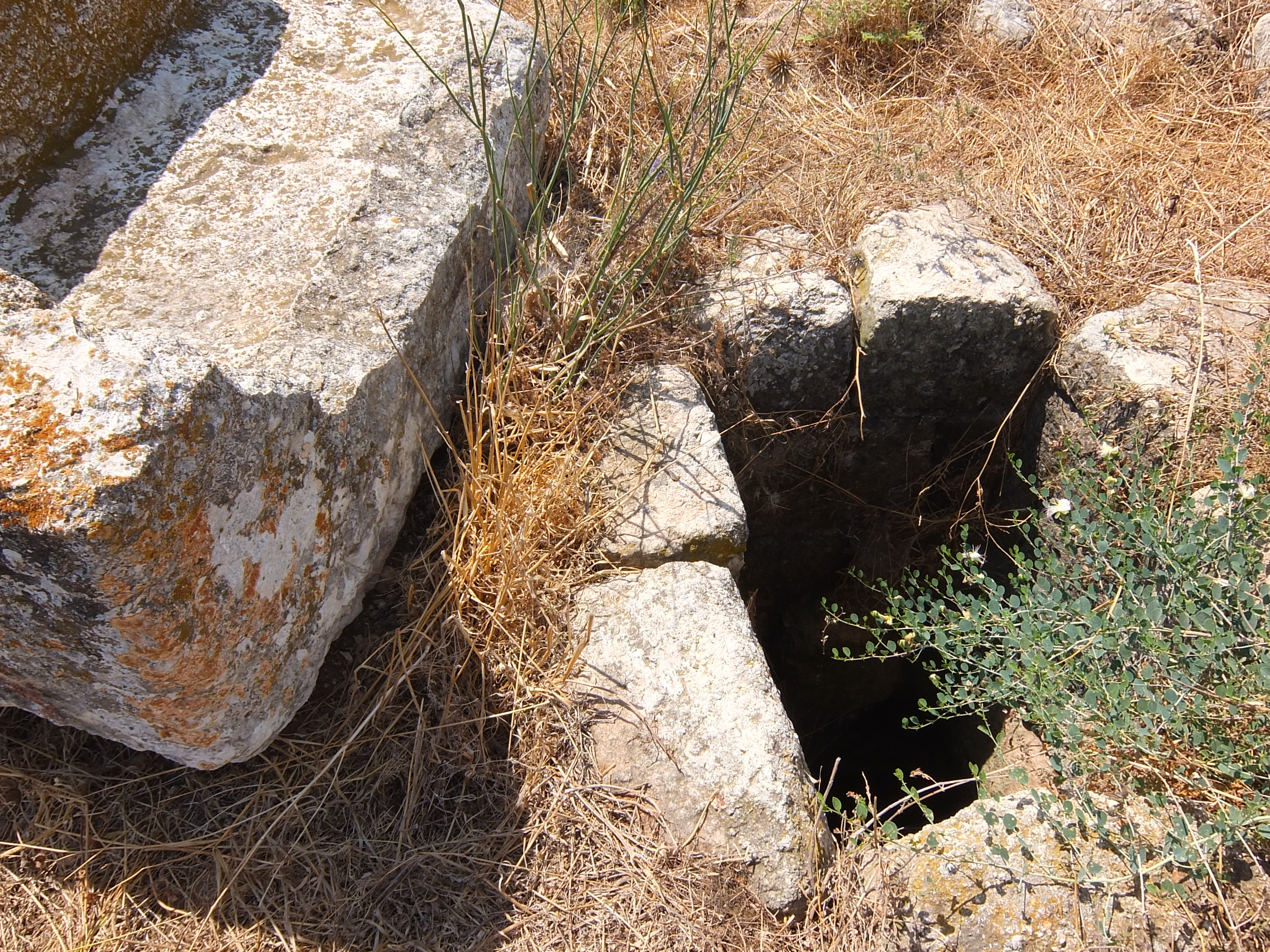
Ancient well with stone trough in dale northwest of Kh. Dhikrin

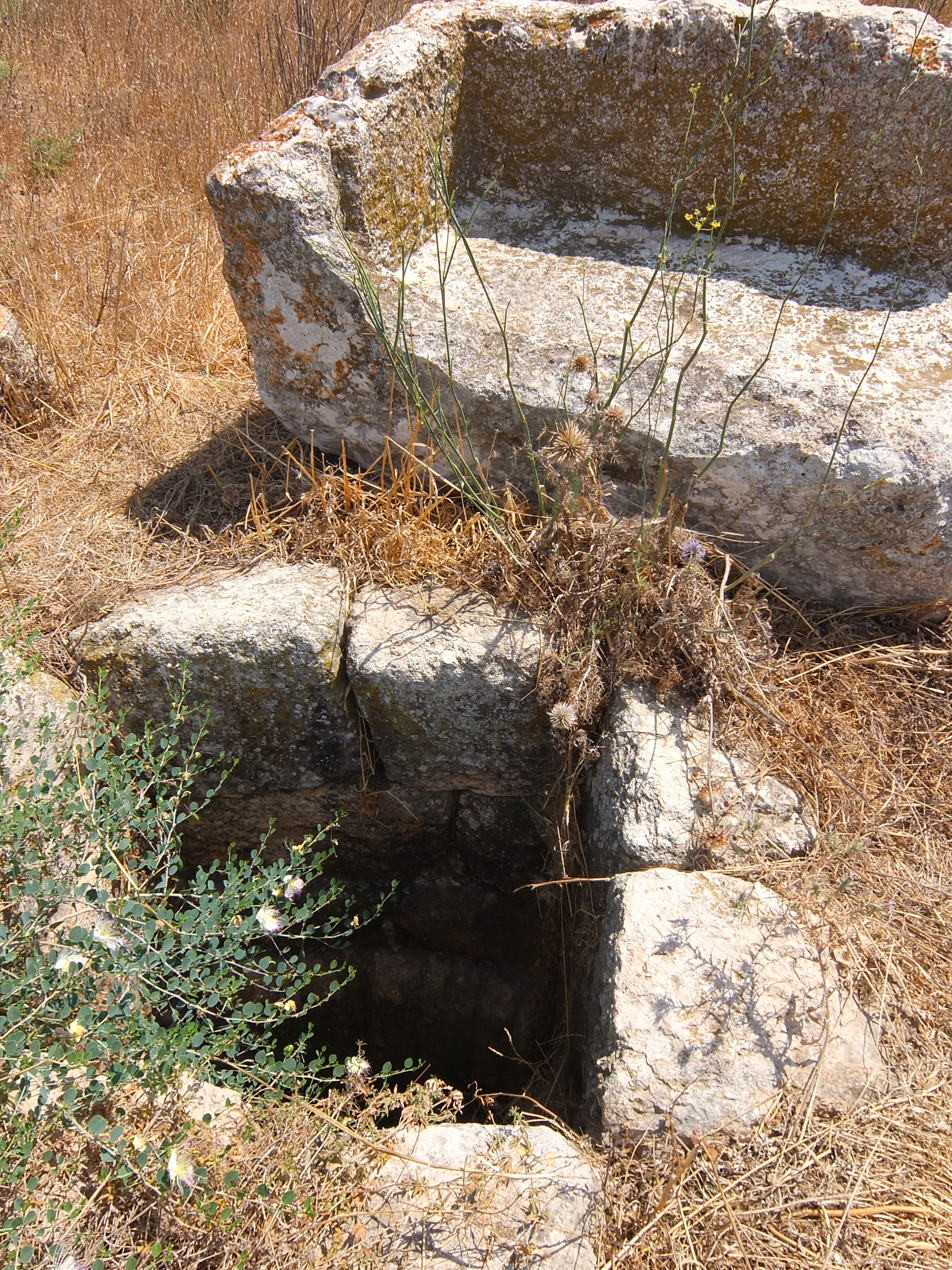
Stone water trough and mouth of deep well, in dale NW of Dhikrin

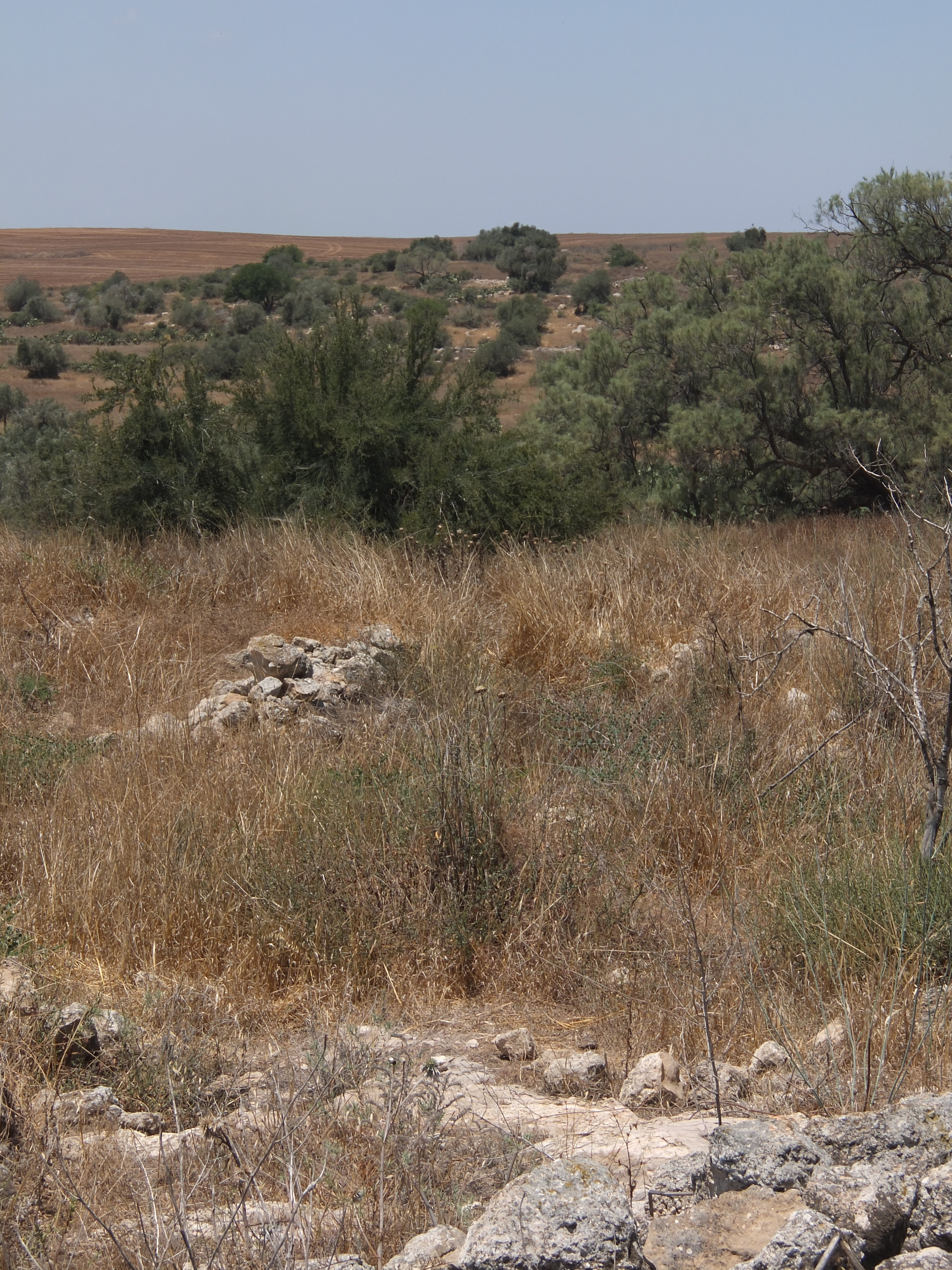
General view - Dhikrin

== Bibliography ==
- Barron, J.B., ed. (1923). Palestine: Report and General Abstracts of the Census of 1922. Government of Palestine.
- Conder, C.R.; Kitchener, H.H. (1883). The Survey of Western Palestine: Memoirs of the Topography, Orography, Hydrography, and Archaeology. Vol. 3. London: Committee of the Palestine Exploration Fund.
- Department of Statistics (1945). Village Statistics, April, 1945. Government of Palestine.
- Guérin, V. (1869). Description Géographique Historique et Archéologique de la Palestine (in French). Vol. 1: Judee, pt. 2. Paris: L'Imprimerie Nationale.
- Hadawi, S. (1970). Village Statistics of 1945: A Classification of Land and Area ownership in Palestine. Palestine Liberation Organization Research Centre.
- Hartmann, M. (1883). "Die Ortschaftenliste des Liwa Jerusalem in dem turkeschen Staatskalender dur Syrien auf das Jahr 1288 der Flucht (1871)". Zeitschrift des Deutschen Palästina-Vereins. 6: 102–149.
- Hütteroth, W.-D.; Abdulfattah, K. (1977). Historical Geography of Palestine, Transjordan and Southern Syria in the Late 16th Century. Erlanger Geographische Arbeiten, Sonderband 5. Erlangen, Germany: Vorstand der Fränkischen Geographischen Gesellschaft. ISBN 3-920405-41-2.
- Khalidi, W. (1992). All That Remains: The Palestinian Villages Occupied and Depopulated by Israel in 1948. Washington D.C.: Institute for Palestine Studies. ISBN 0-88728-224-5.
- Mills, E., ed. (1932). Census of Palestine 1931. Population of Villages, Towns and Administrative Areas. Jerusalem: Government of Palestine.
- Morris, B. (2004). The Birth of the Palestinian Refugee Problem Revisited. Cambridge University Press. ISBN 978-0-521-00967-6.
- Neubauer, A. (1868). La géographie du Talmud : mémoire couronné par l'Académie des inscriptions et belles-lettres (in French). Paris: Lévy.
- Palmer, E.H. (1881). The Survey of Western Palestine: Arabic and English Name Lists Collected During the Survey by Lieutenants Conder and Kitchener, R. E. Transliterated and Explained by E.H. Palmer. Committee of the Palestine Exploration Fund.
- Robinson, E.; Smith, E. (1841). Biblical Researches in Palestine, Mount Sinai and Arabia Petraea: A Journal of Travels in the year 1838. Vol. 2. Boston: Crocker & Brewster.
- Robinson, E.; Smith, E. (1841). Biblical Researches in Palestine, Mount Sinai and Arabia Petraea: A Journal of Travels in the year 1838. Vol. 3. Boston: Crocker & Brewster.
- Schick, C. (1896). "Zur Einwohnerzahl des Bezirks Jerusalem". Zeitschrift des Deutschen Palästina-Vereins. 19: 120–127.
- Socin, A. (1879). "Alphabetisches Verzeichniss von Ortschaften des Paschalik Jerusalem". Zeitschrift des Deutschen Palästina-Vereins. 2: 135–163.
