= Beit Nir =

Kibbutz in southern Israel

Beit Nir: בֵּית נִיר (Hebrew); بيت نير (Arabic)
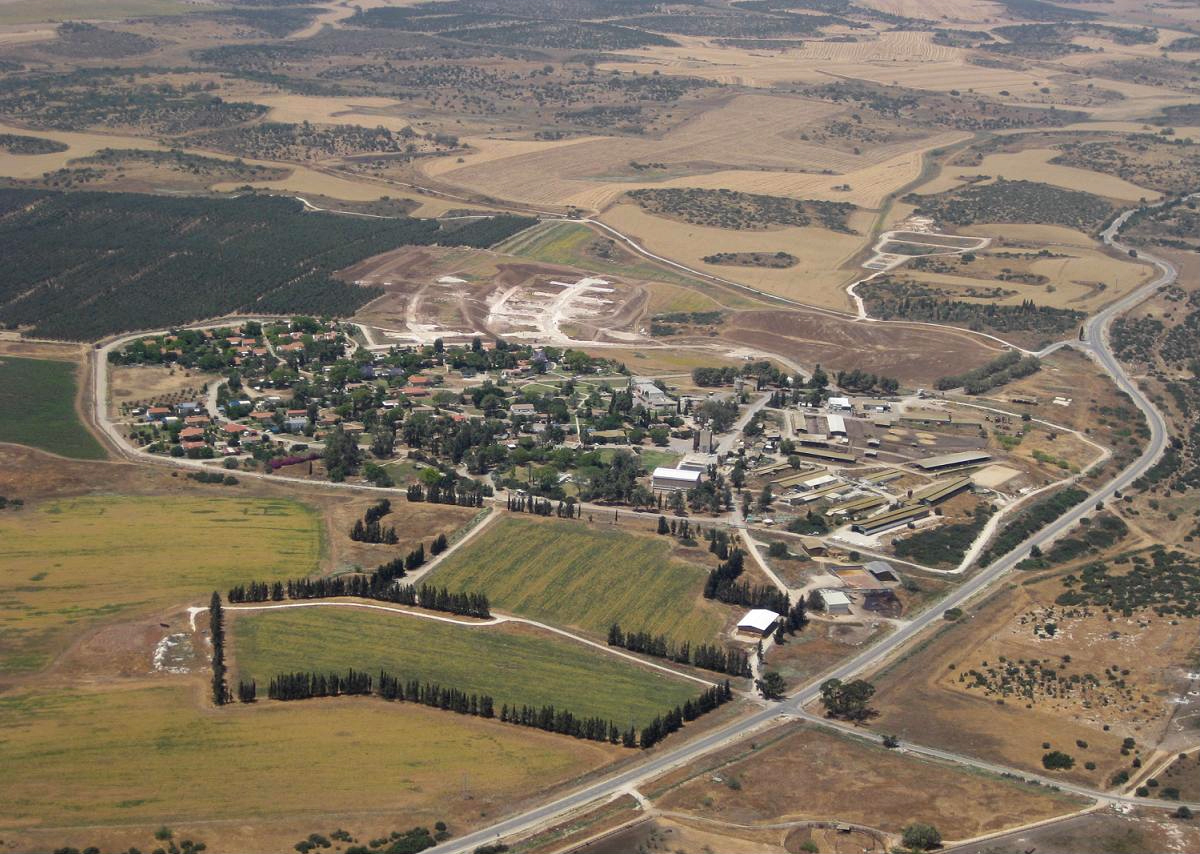

- Location within Ashkelon region of Israel Location within Israel
- Coordinates: 31°38′52″N 34°52′26″E
- Country: Israel
- District: Southern
- Subdistrict: Ashkelon
- Council: Yoav
- Affiliation: Kibbutz Movement
- Founded: 1955–1957
- Founder: Hashomer Hatzair
- Population (2024): 676
- Website: www.beit-nir.org.il

Beit Nir (Hebrew: בֵּית נִיר, lit. House of tilled soil) is a kibbutz in the Lakhish region of south-central Israel. Beit Nir falls under the jurisdiction of Yoav Regional Council and is a member of the Kibbutz Movement. In 2024 its population was 676.

== History ==
Beit Nir was established in August 1957 by members of Hashomer Hatzair, on the lands of the depopulated Palestinian village of Kudna. It was named for Max Bodenheimer, a prominent German Zionist (Boden means "ground" in German and Heim means "home").

== Economy ==
The kibbutz economy is based on agriculture, a soft drinks factory, and a jewelry workshop that sells its wares in Europe and the United States. The kibbutz merged with Gat to form the corporate entity "Ganir", which manufactures fruit juice for export and sale in Israel. In Israel the juice is sold under the brand name Primor (פרימור).

The kibbutz grows wheat, watermelons and cotton, and produces olive oil. Beit Nir also operates a cattle ranch.

== Moshe Shek Museum ==
The museum displays ceramic works and bronze sculptures by Moshe Shek (1935-2011). Shek, who was born in Poland, became a founding member of the kibbutz and a member of the Hashomer Hatzair organisation, and studied at the New Bezalel art school. His wife Shula offers guided tours of the museum.

== Gallery ==
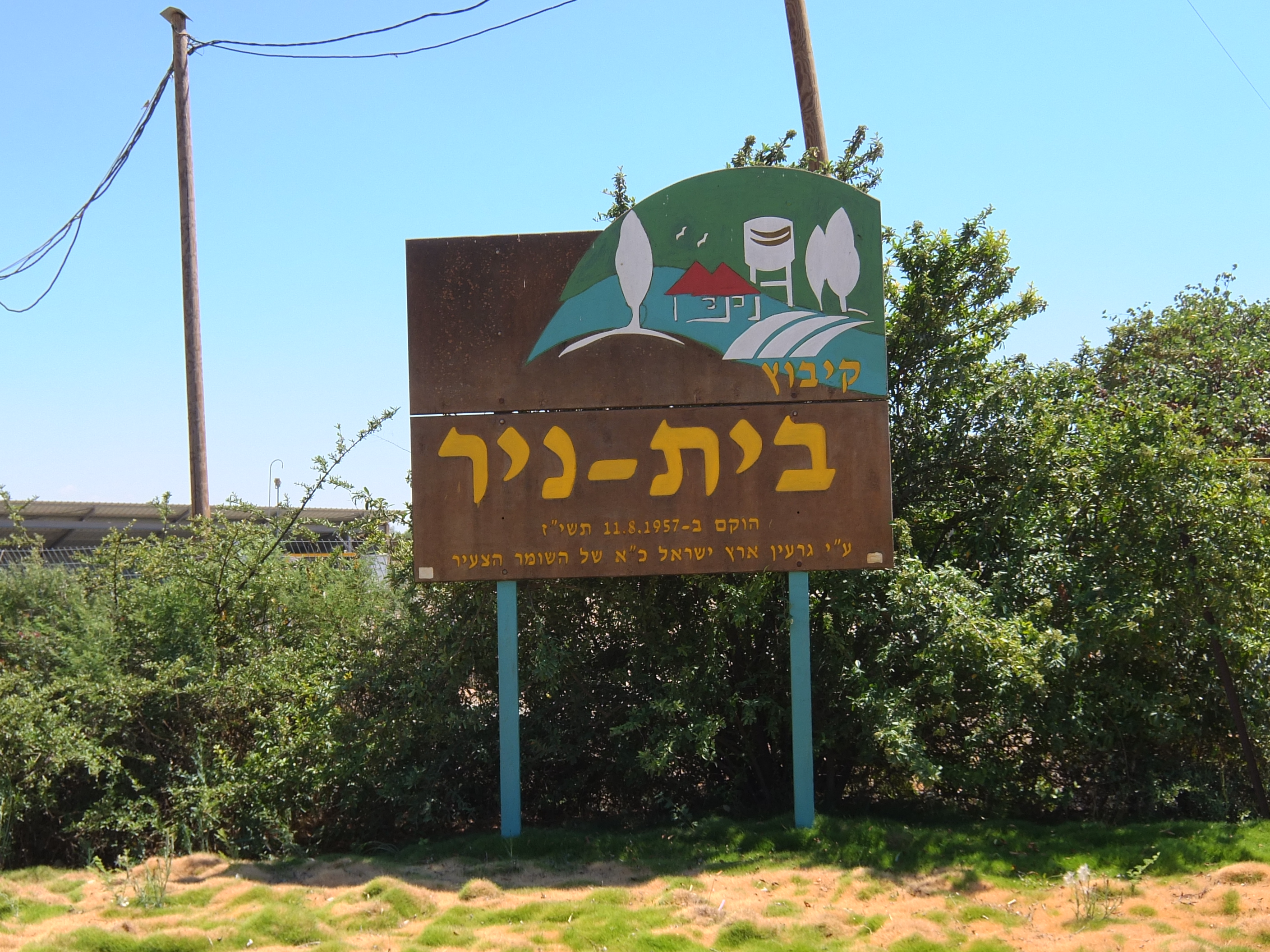
Sign post at entrance to Kibbutz Beit Nir

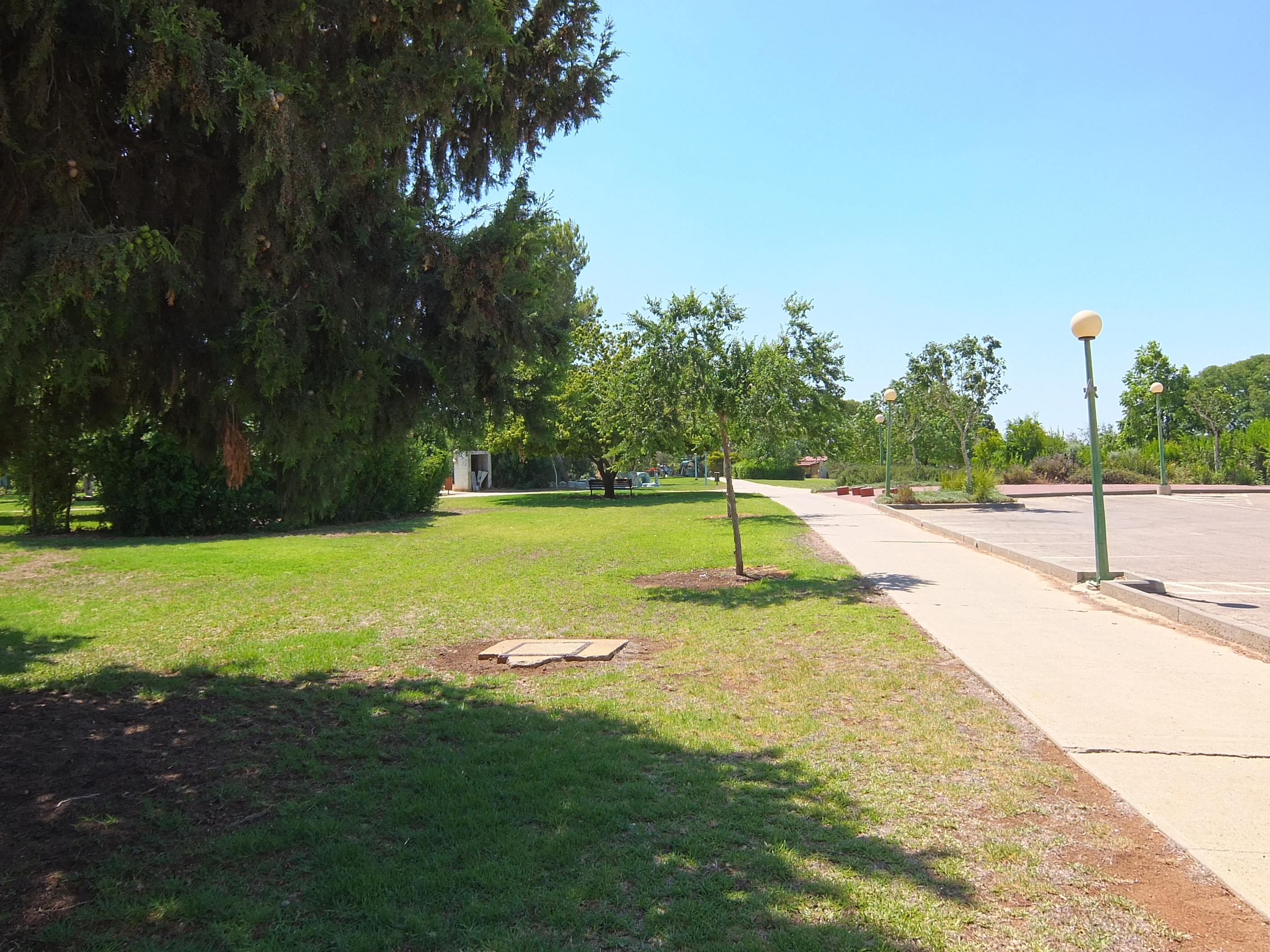
Kibbutz Beit Nir

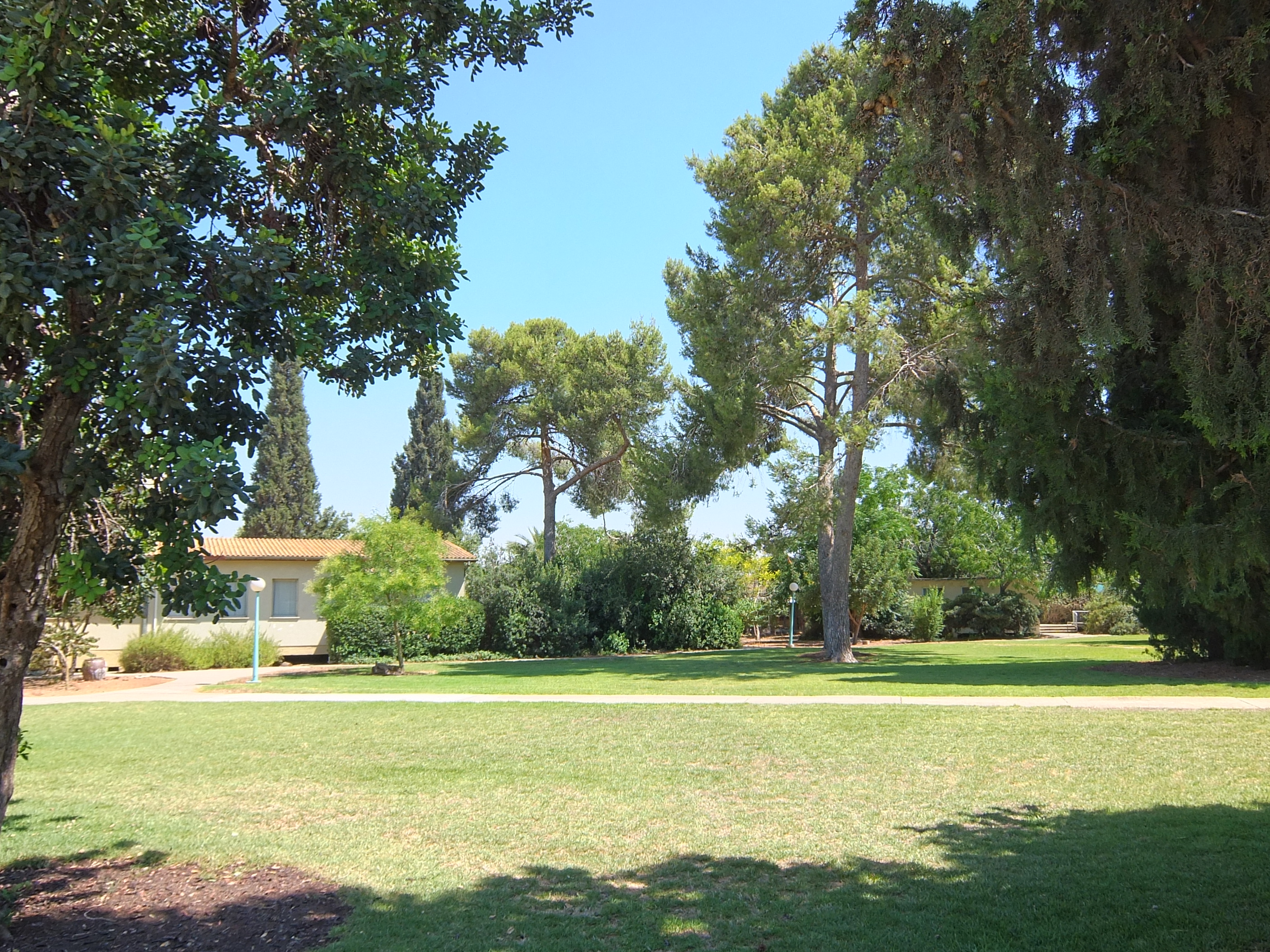
Kibbutz Beit Nir

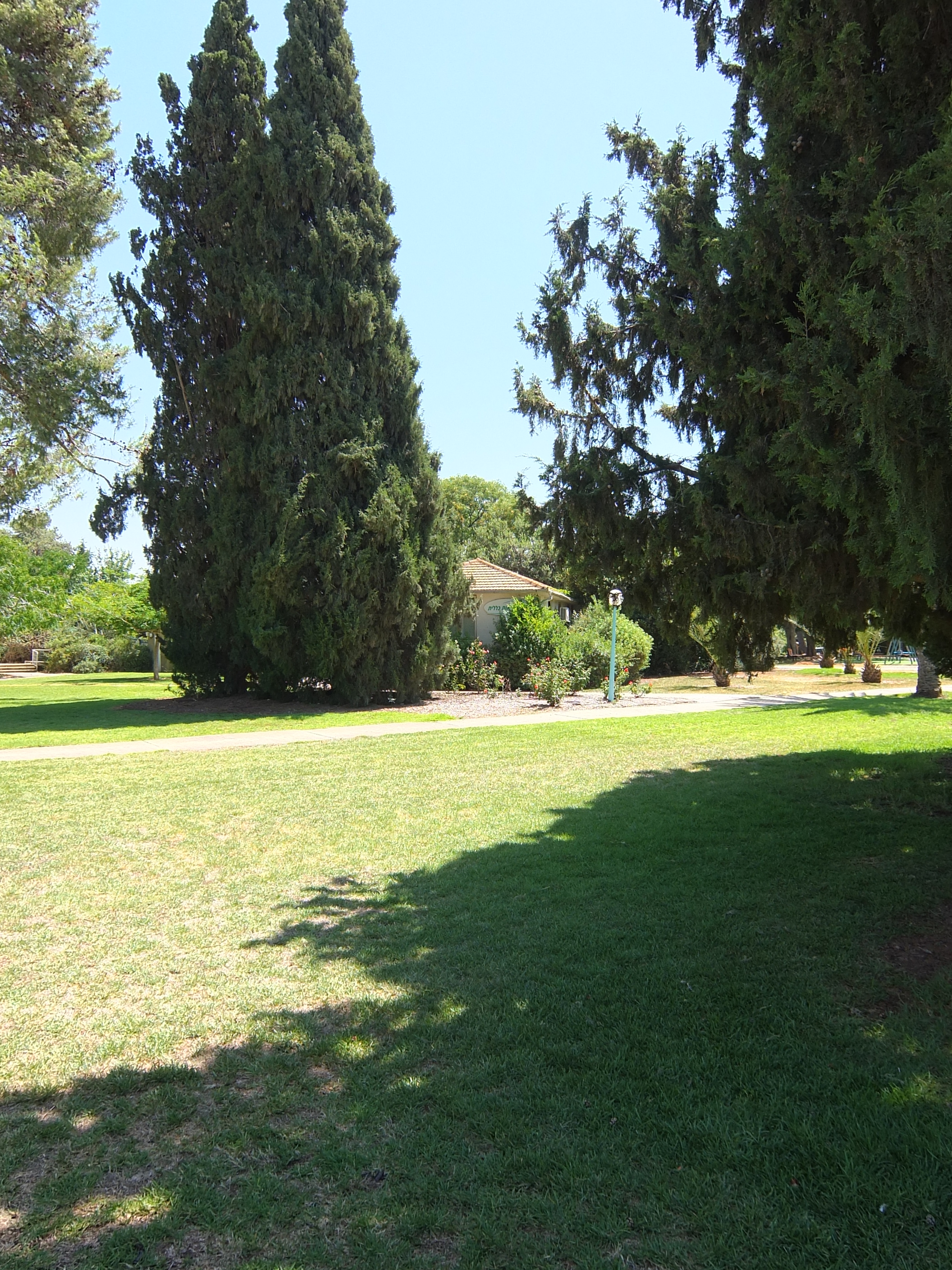
Greenery in Beit Nir

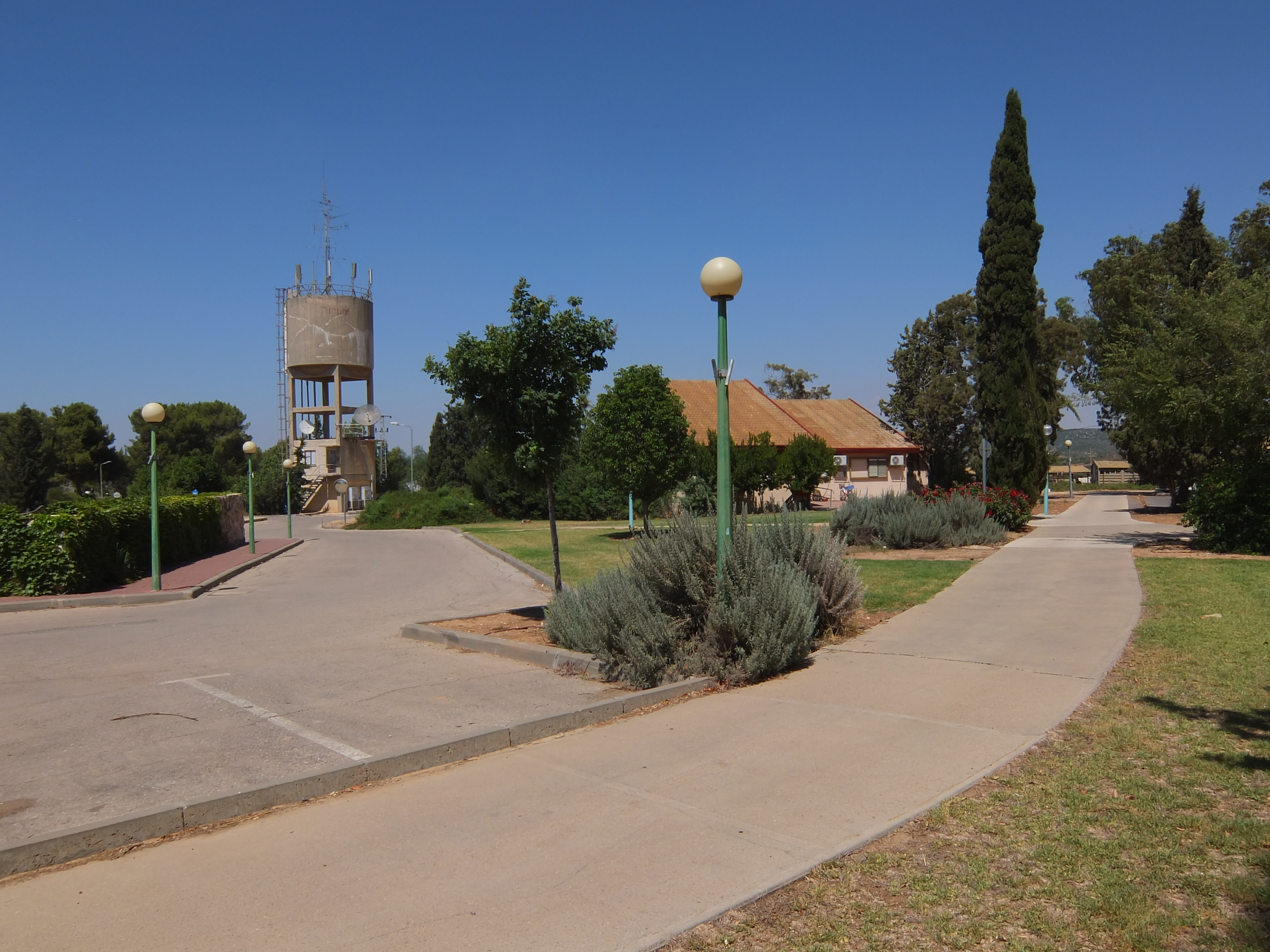
Water tower in Kibbutz Beit Nir
