= Zayta, Hebron =

Zayta زيتا Zeita
- Etymology: oil
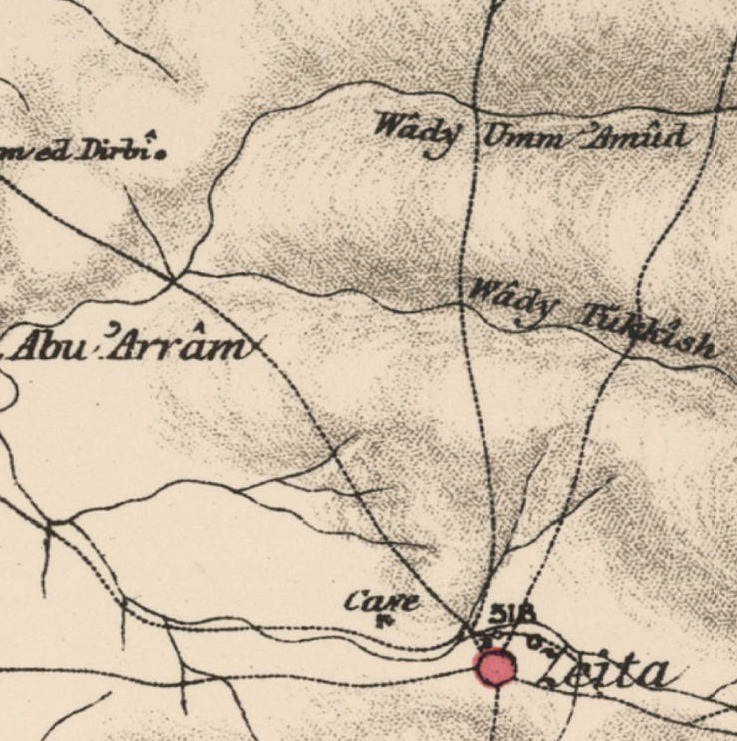
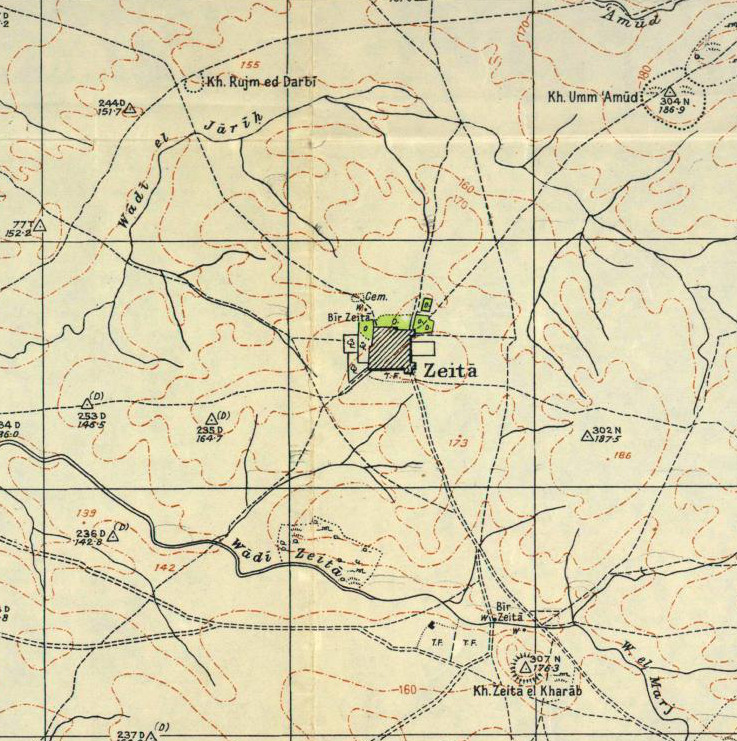
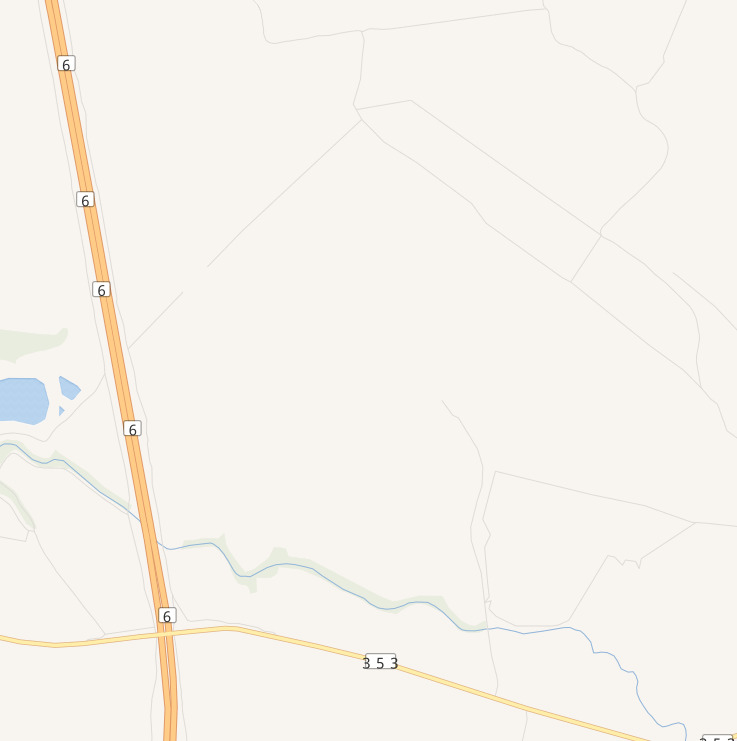
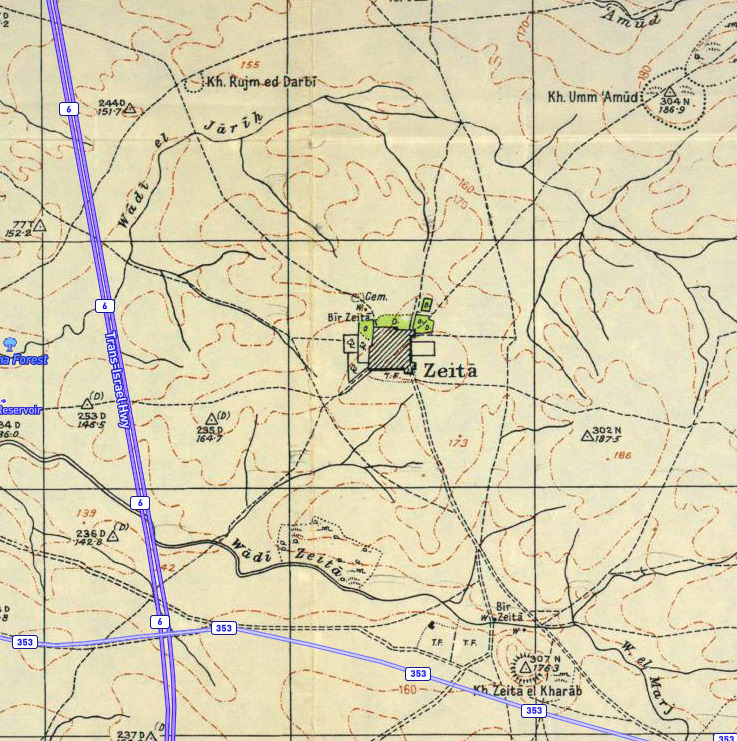
- 1870s map 1940s map modern map 1940s with modern overlay map A series of historical maps of the area around Zayta, Hebron (click the buttons)

- Location within Mandatory Palestine
- Coordinates: 31°38′25″N 34°49′25″E
- Palestine grid: 133/116
- Geopolitical entity: Mandatory Palestine
- Subdistrict: Hebron
- Date of depopulation: July 17–18, 1948

Area
  - Total: 10,490 dunams (10.49 km^{2}; 4.05 sq mi)

Population (1945)
  - Total: 330
- Cause(s) of depopulation: Military assault by Yishuv forces

Zayta (Arabic: زيْتا Zaytā) was a Palestinian Arab village in the Hebron Subdistrict in Mandate Palestine. During Crusader rule in Palestine, the village is mentioned as forming part of the landholdings of the Order of St. John. At the time of the rule of the Ottoman Empire, according to the 1596 census, Zayta had a population of 165. Mentioned by Western travellers to the region in the 19th century, it is described by one as, "a picturesque Arab village"; by 1945, its population was 330 inhabitants.

Until the period of Mandatory Palestine, the village was located at what is known in modern Israel as Tel Zayit; its population was moved 1.5 km north due to the nearby stagnant waters. In 2005, archeologists discovered the Zayit Stone in an excavated limestone wall.

The new Zayta village was depopulated during the 1948 Arab-Israeli War between July 17–18, 1948. Its inhabitants became refugees, ending up the West Bank and Gaza Strip. All that remains of the village structures is the well that served as its main water source.

== Location ==
Zayta was situated on a hill between Bayt Jibrin and Jusayr. Wadi Zayta ("Zayta Valley"), known in biblical times as Zephathah, was located 1 km to the south.

During the British Mandate in Palestine, the village moved 1.5 km to the north, leaving the original site (known as Khirbat Zayta al-Kharab) on the southern bank of the wadi, as it was too close to waters that had become stagnant, breeding insects and disease.

== History ==
The place name ends with a long vowel -ā, typically reflecting the Aramaic absolute state, a morphological feature widely attested in Palestinian toponyms.

In 1136, at the time of the Crusades, the fortress of Bethgibelin and ten villages in the area around Hebron were granted to the Order of St. John by Hugh of Hebron at the request of King Fulk. The King also bequeathed four additional villages to the grant assigned to the Order, one of which was Zayta. Crusader rule over Zayta and the surrounding area came to an end after Saladin's defeat of Crusader forces in 1192.

=== Ottoman era ===
In the 1596 tax records, Zayta formed part of the Ottoman Empire, a village in the nahiya (subdistrict) of Gaza, part of Gaza Sanjak, with a population of 30 Muslim households; an estimated 165 persons. The villagers paid a fixed tax rate of 25% on a number of crops, including wheat and barley, as well as on goats and beehives; a total of 3,500 akçe.

During the 1834 Arab revolt in Palestine, Ibrahim Pasha, the Egyptian leader, personally led his troops to suppress the uprising, and upon encountering a group of rebelling peasants at Zayta, his forces killed 90 men there, and gave chase to the remainder. James Finn, the British Consul to the Ottoman Empire in the 1850s, recounts passing by Zayta while travelling between Gaza and Hebron in the spring of 1853. Finn relates that the peasants there had erected a breastwork into which armed men rushed, who had to be, "parleyed before they would allow us to pass on."

A description of Zeita from the mid-19th century travels of James Turner Barclay notes that it is, "[...] a picturesque Arab village, situated on a conical hill." Writing at length of the well at the foot of the hill where he and his travel companions were directed after inquiring for water, he relates:

"[...] arriving there, we found several persons drawing water for themselves, donkeys, horses, and cattle. And notwithstanding the water was rather warm and considerably muddied by a Fellah who was wading about in the deep fountain, or more correctly speaking, shallow well, yet so thirsty were we that we drank it with decided gusto. It was eight or ten feet deep, and four or five yards in diameter, with the usual stone troughs for watering animals ..."

Camping between the well and the millet fields of the village, Barclay describes the expanse of the cultivated fields, as well as the construction and operation of the well in more detail:

"This Sakieh or well, supplied with machinery for raising water, is plied day and night by camels. A beautiful marble Corinthian capital supports the shaft of the main wheel. There are eighty-five stone jars, each containing two or three gallons, fastened at intervals of four feet on the two endless grass ropes going over the large rough pulley wrapped with grass cords. The water, which is incessantly poured out of the jars, is received into a channel cut into a marble pillar laid horizontally, and thus delivered into a reservoir twenty-four feet square, and thence let off into a trough of masonry thirty-six feet long and two and half broad, the outer border of which is made up of marble pillars worked in horizontally, as in other instances. But copious and unremitting as is this supply of water, it would seem totally inadequate to the demand. Herd after herd, and flock after flock, came crowding in about sunset, and the cry was, "still they come", until it was too dark to count them ..."

In 1863, Victor Guérin noted it as a: "hamlet, whose houses are staggered on the slopes of a hill. At the top of the mound, is a half destroyed tower. The dwellings themselves are mostly falling into ruin. Some contain ancient remains built from other materials: in one, among others, I notice a white marble column. At the bottom of the village is a well, wide and deep, consisting of a simple circular hole measuring three meters in diameter, and surrounded by a large stone belt, roughly hewn and uncemented." An Ottoman village list of about 1870 showed that Zeita had 32 houses and a population of 97, though the population count included men, only.

In the 1883, the PEF's Survey of Western Palestine described Zayta as a small hamlet built of adobe brick, on the edge of the wadi, flanked on two sides by low hills.

=== British Mandate era ===
In the 1922 census of Palestine conducted by the British Mandate authorities, Zaita had a population of 139 inhabitants, all Muslims, increasing in the 1931 census to 234, still all Muslim, in a total of 44 inhabited houses.

According to a 1930 report, the water supply system at Zayta was improved, as it had been "insanitary and malarious." The villagers moved 1.5 km north during this period, to a new village which was laid out in a northeast-southeast direction. The houses were built of mud, wood, and cane. Artesian wells dug between the wadi and the village served as the main source of drinking water, while another well lay to the north.

The villagers worked mainly in rainfed agriculture and stock raising, specializing in goats and sheep. They cultivated grain on large part of their land, and utilized the rest as grazing land for their animals.

In the 1940s, an Arab landowner who owned 1,200 dunams (1.2 km^{2}; 0.46 sq mi) in Zeita, part of which was mortgaged to the bank, contacted Jewish purchasers to sell, as he was fearful of losing his holdings in other areas. By the 1945 statistics, of the 10,490 dunams (10.49 km^{2}; 4.05 sq mi) that made up the village of Zayta, 1,273 dunams (1.273 km^{2}; 0.492 sq mi) were owned by Jews, 3,127 dunams (3.127 km^{2}; 1.207 sq mi) were owned by Arabs, and the remaining 6,090 dunams (6.09 km^{2}; 2.35 sq mi) were public lands held by the village in common. At this time, the village population was estimated at 330 Muslims. In 1944/45 a total of 10,105 dunums of village land was allocated to cereals, while 33 dunams were classified urban, public areas.

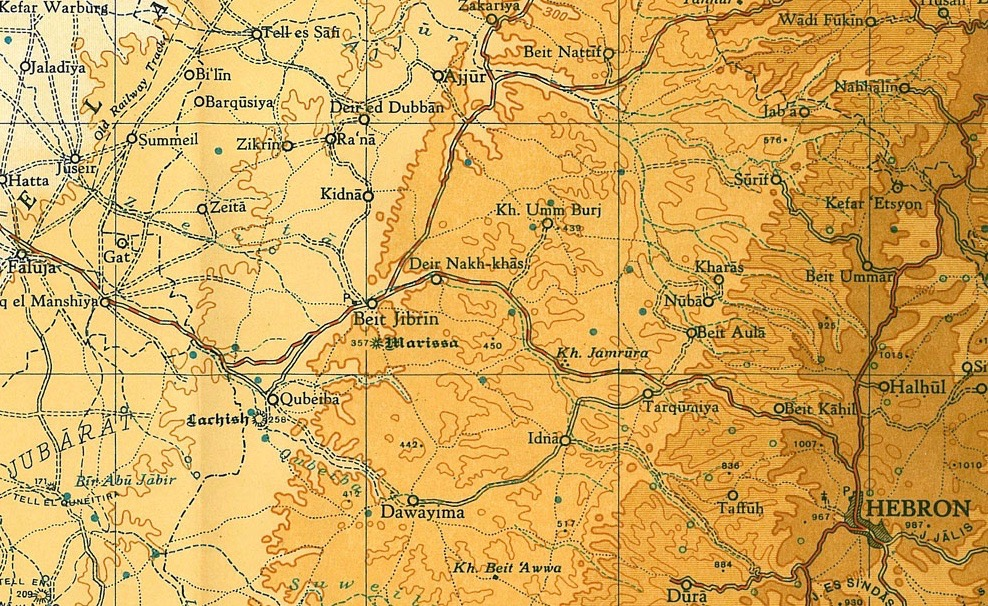
Zayta 1948 1:250,000 (top left quadrant)

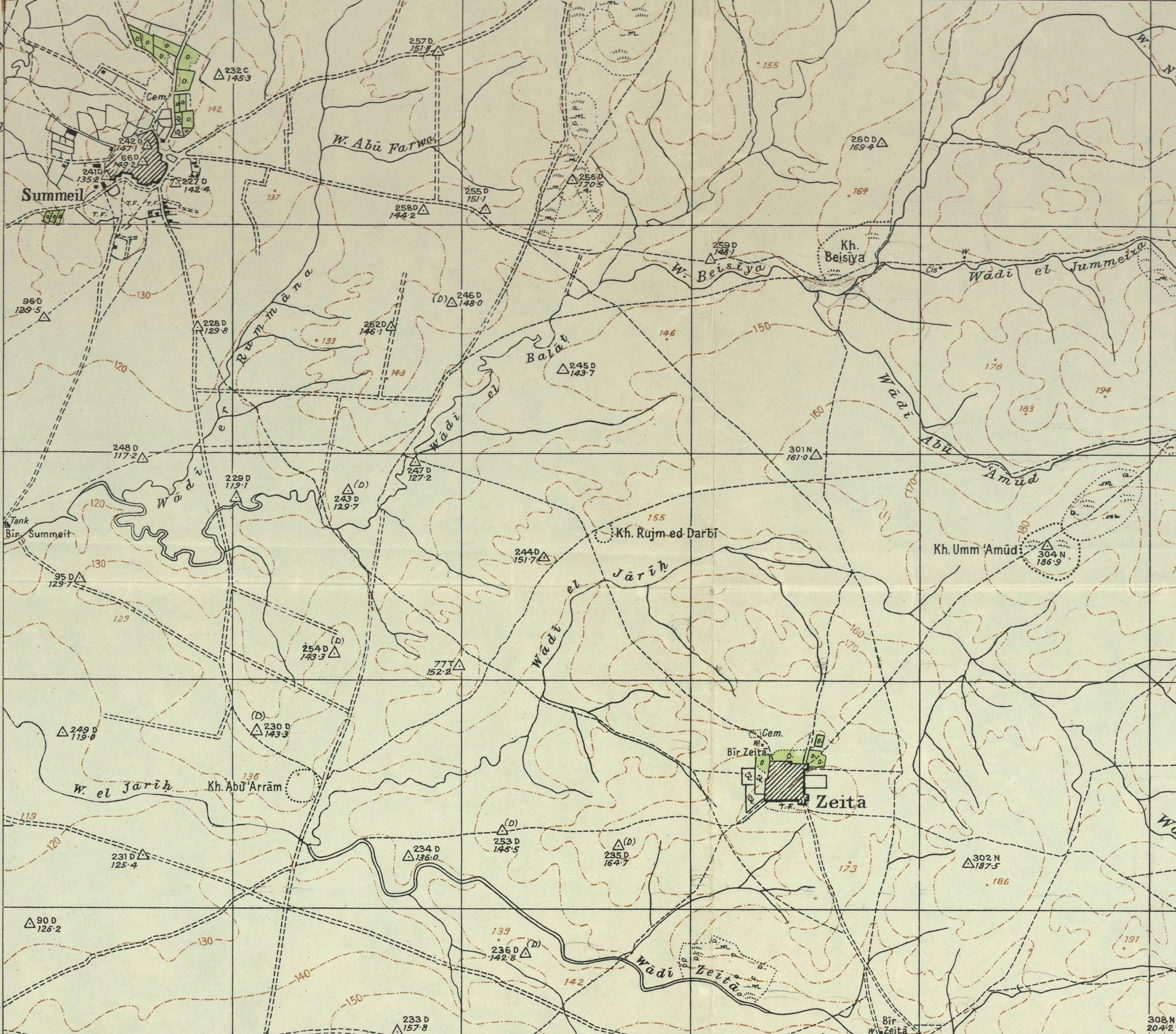
Zayta 1948 1:20,000

=== 1948, and aftermath ===
Zayta was depopulated during the 1948 Arab-Israeli war as a result of a military assault by Israeli forces carried out between July 17–18. Givati´s fifty-first platoon raided several Arab villages in the vicinity of Kfar Menahem, including Zayta. It was reported that they had "expelled their inhabitants, [and] blew up and burned down a number of houses; the area is now clear [naki] of Arabs." Zayta was one of many Palestinian villages depopulated by Givati troops. Most of the villagers uprooted in these operations fled to the Hebron Hills, with a small minority going to the Gaza Strip.

By August 20, 1948, Zayta was one (of 32) depopulated Palestinian villages proposed by Ben-Gurion and the rest of the "Settlement executives" as suitable for the construction of new Jewish settlements. According to Benny Morris, for the land of Zayta, the settlement proposed was kibbutz Gal On. According to Walid Khalidi, this settlement was already in place on land traditionally belonging to the village of Ra'na, 2 km east of the village site.

In 1992 Khalidi noted that of the remaining structures of the village, "There are no traces of houses; only a well, still in use, is left."

== References in literature ==
Sulafa Hijjawi (b. 1934), a Palestinian poet in Nablus, writes of the destruction of Zeita, her village, as follows: "In moments the village was gone, not a single bread oven remained, men and stones were powdered by enemy tractors. But Zeita rises again as tulips do."

== Bibliography ==
- Barron, J.B., ed. (1923). Palestine: Report and General Abstracts of the Census of 1922. Government of Palestine.
- Barclay, J. T. (1857). The City of the Great King: or, Jerusalem as it was, as it is, and as it is to be. Challen.
- Conder, C.R.; Kitchener, H.H. (1883). The Survey of Western Palestine: Memoirs of the Topography, Orography, Hydrography, and Archaeology. Vol. 3. London: Committee of the Palestine Exploration Fund.
- Finn, J. (1877). Byeways in Palestine. London: James Nisbet.
- Gilbar, Gad G.; Makhon le-ḥeḳer ha-Mizraḥ ha-tikhon ʻa. sh. Gusṭav Haineman (1990). Gad G. Gilbar (ed.). Ottoman Palestine, 1800-1914: studies in economic and social history (Illustrated ed.). Haifa, Israel: Brill Archive. ISBN 978-90-04-07785-0.
- Government of Palestine, Department of Statistics (1945). Village Statistics, April, 1945.
- Great Britain, Colonial Office, League of Nations, Council (1930). Report by His Majesty's Government in the United Kingdom of Great Britain and Northern Ireland to the Council of the League of Nations on the administration of Palestine and Trans-Jordan for the year ..., Issue 117. Printed and published by His Majesty's Stationery Office.
- Guérin, V. (1869). Description Géographique Historique et Archéologique de la Palestine (in French). Vol. 1: Judee, pt. 2. Paris: L'Imprimerie Nationale.
- Hadawi, S. (1970). Village Statistics of 1945: A Classification of Land and Area ownership in Palestine. Palestine Liberation Organization Research Center.
- Hartmann, M. (1883). "Die Ortschaftenliste des Liwa Jerusalem in dem türkischen Staatskalender für Syrien auf das Jahr 1288 der Flucht (1871)". Zeitschrift des Deutschen Palästina-Vereins. 6: 102–149.
- Hütteroth, W.-D.; Abdulfattah, K. (1977). Historical Geography of Palestine, Transjordan and Southern Syria in the Late 16th Century. Erlanger Geographische Arbeiten, Sonderband 5. Erlangen, Germany: Vorstand der Fränkischen Geographischen Gesellschaft. ISBN 3-920405-41-2.
- Khalidi, W. (1992). All That Remains: The Palestinian Villages Occupied and Depopulated by Israel in 1948. Washington D.C.: Institute for Palestine Studies. ISBN 0-88728-224-5.
- Khan, L. Ali (2006). A theory of international terrorism: understanding Islamic militancy. Martinus Nijhoff Publishers. ISBN 978-90-04-15207-6.
- Mills, E., ed. (1932). Census of Palestine 1931. Population of Villages, Towns and Administrative Areas. Jerusalem: Government of Palestine.
- Morris, B. (2004). The Birth of the Palestinian Refugee Problem Revisited. Cambridge University Press. ISBN 978-0-521-00967-6.
- Morris, B. (2008). 1948 The First Arab-Israeli War. Yale University Press. ISBN 978-0-300-12696-9.
- Nader, Marwan (2006). Burgesses and Burgess law in the Latin Kingdoms of Jerusalem and Cyprus, 1099-1325 (Illustrated ed.). Ashgate Publishing, Ltd. ISBN 978-0-7546-5687-6.
- Palmer, E.H. (1881). The Survey of Western Palestine: Arabic and English Name Lists Collected During the Survey by Lieutenants Conder and Kitchener, R. E. Transliterated and Explained by E.H. Palmer. Committee of the Palestine Exploration Fund.
- Pfeiffer, Charles F.; Vos, Howard Frederic (1967). The Wycliffe historical geography of Bible lands. Moody Press.
- Robinson, E.; Smith, E. (1841). Biblical Researches in Palestine, Mount Sinai and Arabia Petraea: A Journal of Travels in the year 1838. Vol. 3. Boston: Crocker & Brewster.
- Socin, A. (1879). "Alphabetisches Verzeichniss von Ortschaften des Paschalik Jerusalem". Zeitschrift des Deutschen Palästina-Vereins. 2: 135–163.
- Tuten, Eric Engel (2005). Between capital and land: the Jewish National Fund's finances and land-purchase priorities in Palestine, 1939-45 (Illustrated ed.). Routledge. ISBN 978-0-7146-5634-2.
