= Hebron Subdistrict, Mandatory Palestine =

Administrative division of British Palestine (1920–1948)

Hebron Subdistrict قضاء الخليل נפת חברון
- Subdistrict of Mandatory Palestine
- 1920–1948
- Capital: Hebron
- History
  - Established: 1920
  - Conquered: 15 May 1948
Preceded by	Succeeded by
Jerusalem Sanjak	Israel; Jordanian annexation of the West Bank
- Today part of: Israel ∟ Southern District ∟ Jerusalem District ∟ Judea and Samaria Area; West Bank ∟ Palestinian National Authority

The Hebron Subdistrict was one of the subdistricts of Mandatory Palestine. It was located around the city of Hebron. After the 1948 Arab-Israeli War, the subdistrict was divided between Israel and the West Bank.

== Towns and villages ==
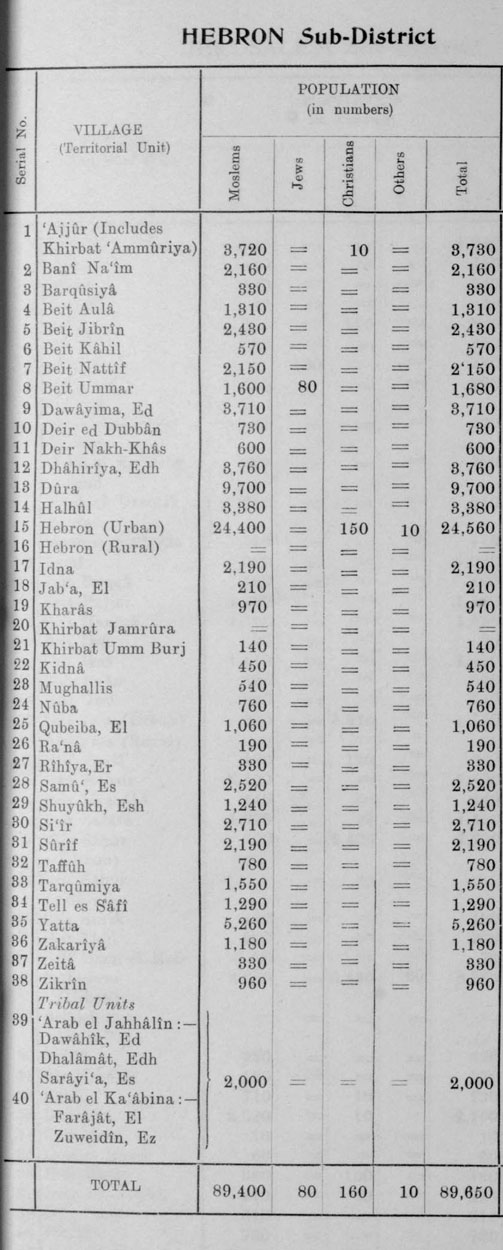
Official population statistics for the sub-district, from Village Statistics, 1945.

Hebron Sub-District – Population by Village
Village	Muslims	Jews	Christians	Others	Total
‘Ajjur (Includes Khirbat ‘Ammuriya)	3,720		10		3,730
Bani Na‘im	2,160				2,160
Barqusya	330				330
Beit Aula	1,310				1,310
Beit Jibrin	2,430				2,430
Beit Kahil	570				570
Beit Nattif	2,150				2,150
Beit ‘Ummar	1,600	80			1,680
Dawayima, Ed	3,710				3,710
Deir ed Dubban	730				730
Deir Nakh-Khas	600				600
Dhahiriya, Edh	3,760				3,760
Dura	9,700				9,700
Halhul	3,380				3,380
Hebron (Urban)	24,400		150	10	24,560
Hebron (Rural)					
Idna	2,190				2,190
Ja‘fa, El	210				210
Kharas	970				970
Khirbat Jamrura					
Khirbat Umm Burj	140				140
Kidna	450				450
Mughallis	540				540
Nuba	760				760
Qubeiba, El	1,060				1,060
Ra‘na	190				190
Rihiya, Er	330				330
Samu‘, Es	2,520				2,520
Shuyukh, Esh	1,240				1,240
Si‘ir	2,710				2,710
Surif	2,190				2,190
Tafuh	780				780
Tarqumiya	1,550				1,550
Tell es Safi	1,290				1,290
Yatta	5,260				5,260
Zakariya	1,180				1,180
Zeita	330				330
Zikrin	960				960
‘Arab el Jahalin (Dawahik, Ed; Dhalamat, Edh; Sarayi‘a, Es)	2,000				2,000
TOTAL	89,400	80	160	10	89,650

=== Depopulated towns and villages ===
(current localities in parentheses)

- 'Ajjur (Agur, Li-On, Tirosh)
- Barqusya
- Bayt Jibrin (Beit Guvrin)
- Bayt Nattif
- al-Dawayima (Amatzya)
- Deir al-Dubban (Luzit)
- Dayr Nakhkhas
- Kudna (Beit Nir)
- Mughallis (Gefen)
- al-Qubayba (Lachish)
- Ra'na (Gal On)
- Tell es-Safi
- Khirbat Umm Burj (Nehusha)
- az-Zakariyya (Zekharia)
- Zayta
- Zikrin
