= Ra'na =

Ra'na رعنة
- Etymology: The spur of a Hill
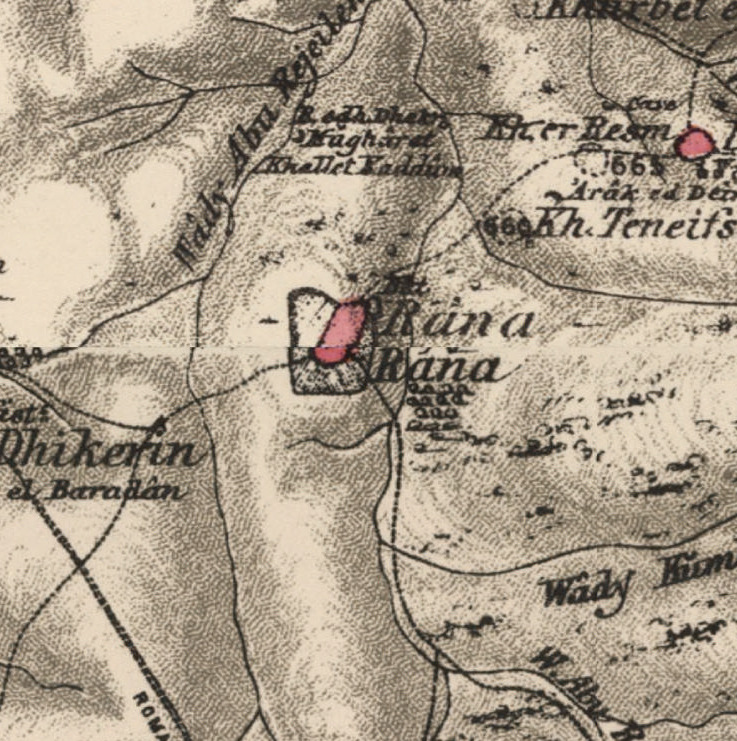
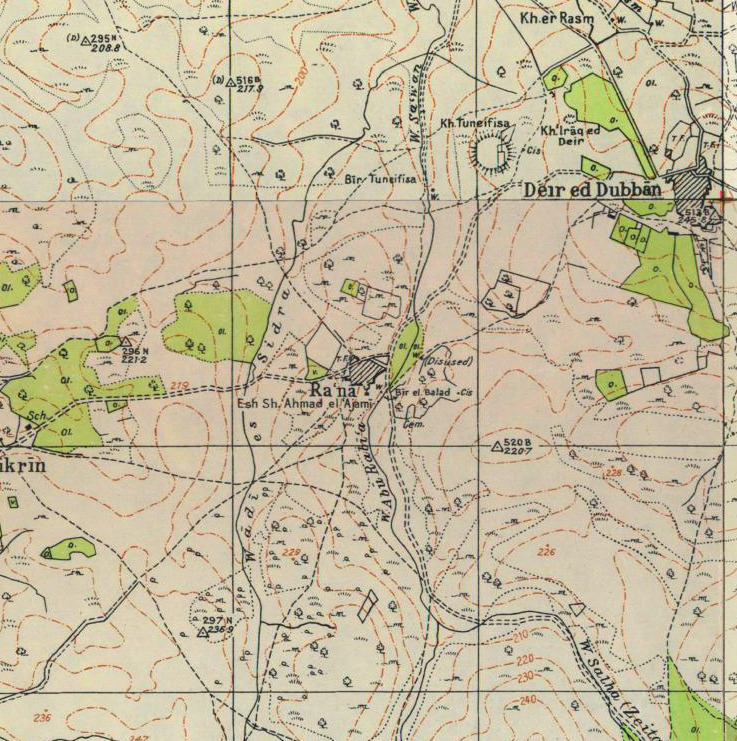
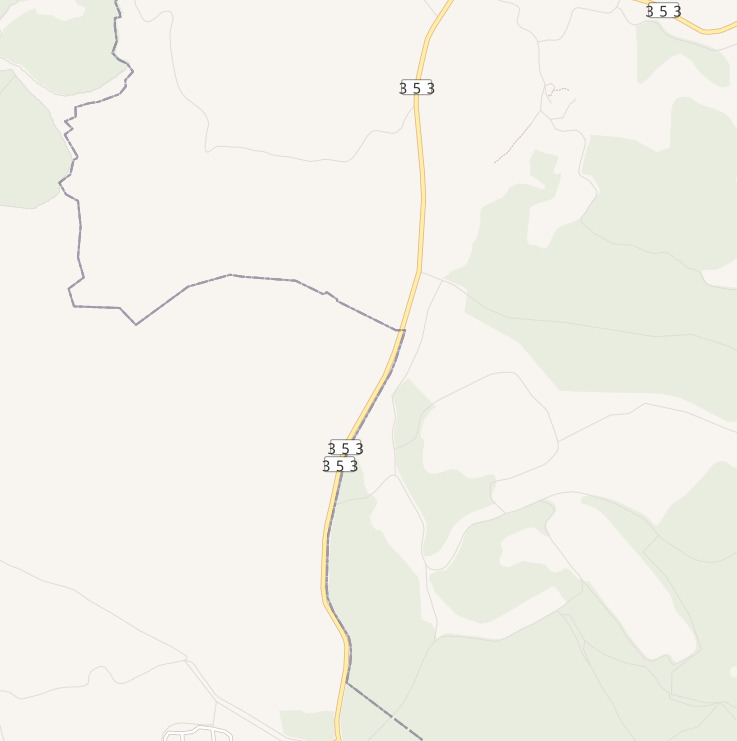
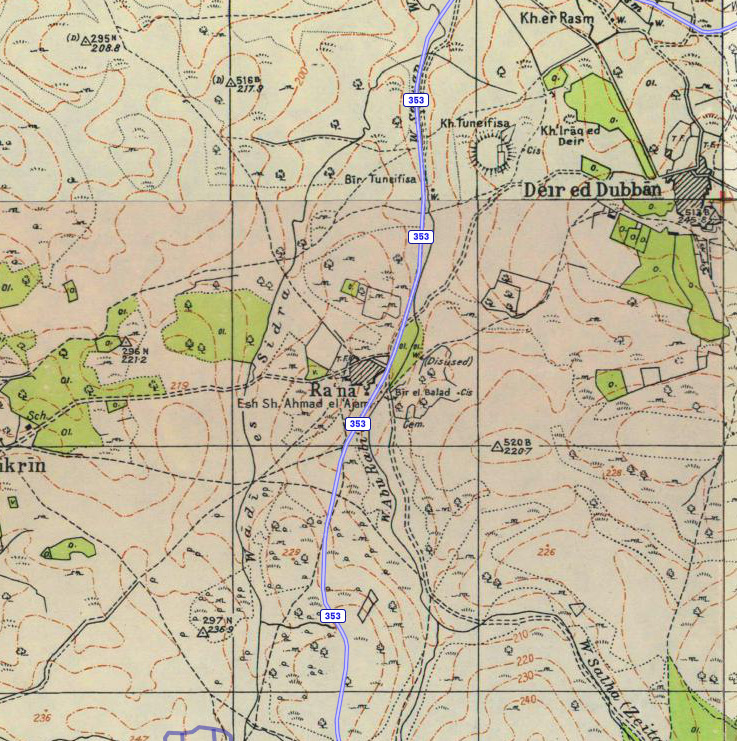
- 1870s map 1940s map modern map 1940s with modern overlay map A series of historical maps of the area around Ra'na (click the buttons)

- Location within Mandatory Palestine
- Coordinates: 31°39′57″N 34°52′43″E
- Palestine grid: 138/119
- Geopolitical entity: Mandatory Palestine
- Subdistrict: Hebron
- Date of depopulation: 22–23 October 1948

Area
  - Total: 6.925 dunams (0.6925 ha; 1.711 acres)

Population (1945)
  - Total: 190
- Cause(s) of depopulation: Military assault by Yishuv forces
- Current Localities: Gal On

Ra'na (Arabic: رعنة) was a village located approximately 26 km northwest of Hebron. It was occupied by the Israeli army during Operation Yo'av in October 1948. It was one of 16 villages in the Hebron district that were depopulated.

== History ==
In 1838, during the Ottoman Empire, Edward Robinson noted it as Muslim village, located in the Gaza district. He further reported that the fields of Ra'na were planted with tobacco and cotton.

In 1863 Victor Guérin described it as a "village now reduced to a few huts, but that once had been much more considerable, judging by two beautiful wells dug in the rock and by a number of great stones scattered here and there". An Ottoman village list of about 1870 showed that Ra'na had 8 houses and a population of 30, though the population count included men, only.

In 1882, the PEF's Survey of Western Palestine described Ra'na as a village built of stone and adobe, and it had a pool and gardens.

In 1896 the population of Ra'na was estimated to be about 99 persons.

=== British Mandate era ===
Ra'na was classified as hamlet by the Palestine Index Gazetteer. In the 1922 census of Palestine conducted by the British Mandate authorities, Ra'ana had a population of 126 inhabitants, all Muslims, increasing in the 1931 census to 150, still all Muslim, in a total of 36 inhabited houses.

In 1945 statistics the population of Ra'na was 190, all Muslims. In 1944/45 a total of 5,882 dunums of land was planted with cereals, while 112 dunums were irrigated or used for orchards. Grain was the dominant crop, but during the final year of the British Mandate of Palestine, the villagers also grew grapes, carob and olives. 14 dunams were classified as built-up (urban) areas.

The kibbutz of Gal On was established in 1946 on what had traditionally been village land.

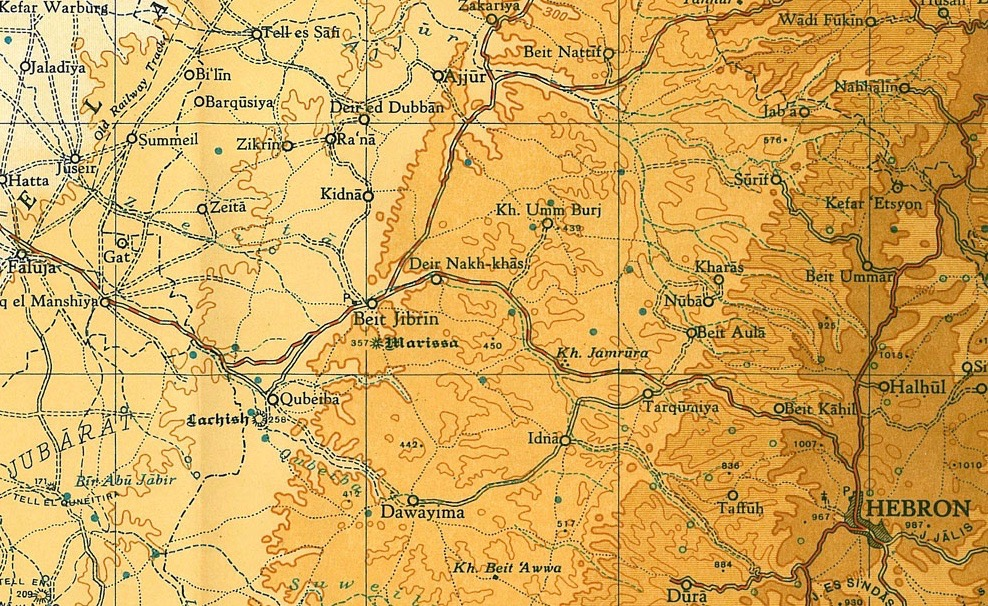
Ra'na 1948 1:250,000 (top left quadrant)

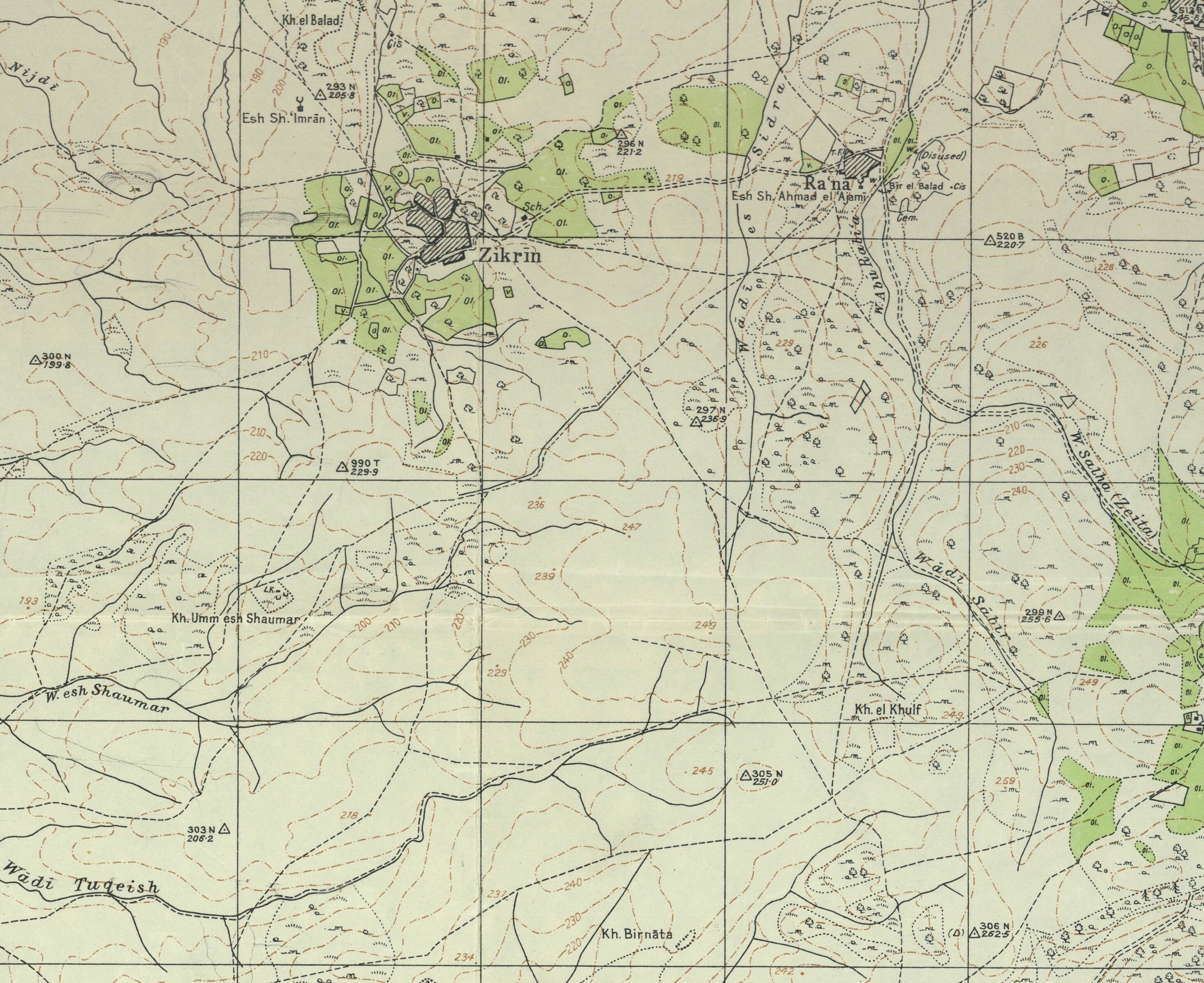
Ra'na 1948 1:20,000

=== 1948, and after ===
The village was attacked by the Giv'ati Brigade on 22–23 October 1948. Those villagers who had not already fled were expelled and the village destroyed.

Following the war, the area was incorporated into the State of Israel. Palestinian historian Walid Khalidi described that the site of the village in 1992: "The site is fenced in with barbed wire and is overgrown in part by cactuses, especially where there is limestone soil, and by carob trees. No houses or rubble remains."

== People from Ra'na ==
- Ata Abu Rashta

== See also ==
- Depopulated Palestinian locations in Israel

== Bibliography ==
- Barron, J.B., ed. (1923). Palestine: Report and General Abstracts of the Census of 1922. Government of Palestine.
- Conder, C.R.; Kitchener, H.H. (1882). The Survey of Western Palestine: Memoirs of the Topography, Orography, Hydrography, and Archaeology. Vol. 2. London: Committee of the Palestine Exploration Fund.
- Department of Statistics (1945). Village Statistics, April, 1945. Government of Palestine.
- Guérin, V. (1869). Description Géographique Historique et Archéologique de la Palestine (in French). Vol. 1: Judee, pt. 2. Paris: L'Imprimerie Nationale.
- Hadawi, S. (1970). Village Statistics of 1945: A Classification of Land and Area ownership in Palestine. Palestine Liberation Organization Research Centre.
- Hartmann, M. (1883). "Die Ortschaftenliste des Liwa Jerusalem in dem turkeschen Staatskalender dur Syrien auf das Jahr 1288 der Flucht (1871)". Zeitschrift des Deutschen Palästina-Vereins. 6: 102–149.
- Khalidi, W. (1992). All That Remains: The Palestinian Villages Occupied and Depopulated by Israel in 1948. Washington D.C.: Institute for Palestine Studies. ISBN 0-88728-224-5.
- Mills, E., ed. (1932). Census of Palestine 1931. Population of Villages, Towns and Administrative Areas. Jerusalem: Government of Palestine.
- Morris, B. (2004). The Birth of the Palestinian Refugee Problem Revisited. Cambridge University Press. ISBN 978-0-521-00967-6.
- Palmer, E.H. (1881). The Survey of Western Palestine: Arabic and English Name Lists Collected During the Survey by Lieutenants Conder and Kitchener, R. E. Transliterated and Explained by E.H. Palmer. Committee of the Palestine Exploration Fund.
- Robinson, E.; Smith, E. (1841). Biblical Researches in Palestine, Mount Sinai and Arabia Petraea: A Journal of Travels in the year 1838. Vol. 2. Boston: Crocker & Brewster.
- Robinson, E.; Smith, E. (1841). Biblical Researches in Palestine, Mount Sinai and Arabia Petraea: A Journal of Travels in the year 1838. Vol. 3. Boston: Crocker & Brewster.
- Schick, C. (1896). "Zur Einwohnerzahl des Bezirks Jerusalem". Zeitschrift des Deutschen Palästina-Vereins. 19: 120–127.
- Socin, A. (1879). "Alphabetisches Verzeichniss von Ortschaften des Paschalik Jerusalem". Zeitschrift des Deutschen Palästina-Vereins. 2: 135–163.
