= Itzhak Brik =

Israeli IDF General

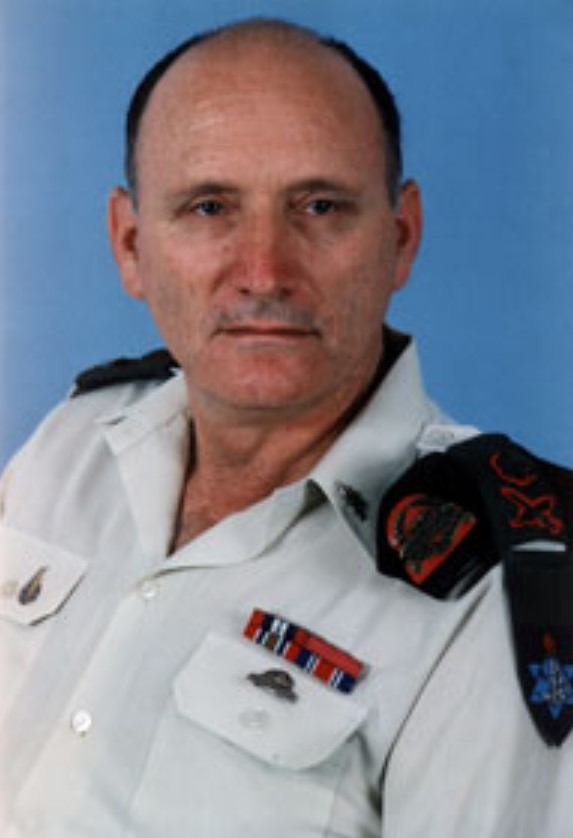
Yitzchak Brik

Itzhak Brik (Hebrew: יצחק בריק; born November 7, 1947, Gal On) is an Israeli IDF General (reserve). He served in the Armored Corps as a brigade, division and troops commander and served as the commander of the IDF Military Colleges. He fought as a reserve company commander in the Yom Kippur War and was decorated with the Medal of Courage.

He served for about a decade as the Soldier's Complaints Commissioner (Ombudsman) in the Ministry of Defense. Near his retirement from this position in 2018, and even more so afterward, Brik became known as a harsh critic of the preparation of the IDF and the Ministry of Defense to a regional war in the Middle East, and is considered in Israel as the "prophet of wrath" of the Gaza war.

Brik addressed the Gaza war entering its twentieth month, dismissing official Israeli claims of progress. Referring to the latest military campaign dubbed Operation Gideon’s Chariots, he wrote, “Just as the political and military echelons lied to the public throughout the war, declaring back and forth that it was a matter of days until Hamas would surrender… The same lies of the political and military echelons continue even now.”
