= Dayr Nakhkhas =

Dayr Nakhkhas دير النخّاس Deir Nakhkhas, Deir Nakh-khas, Deir Nakhas
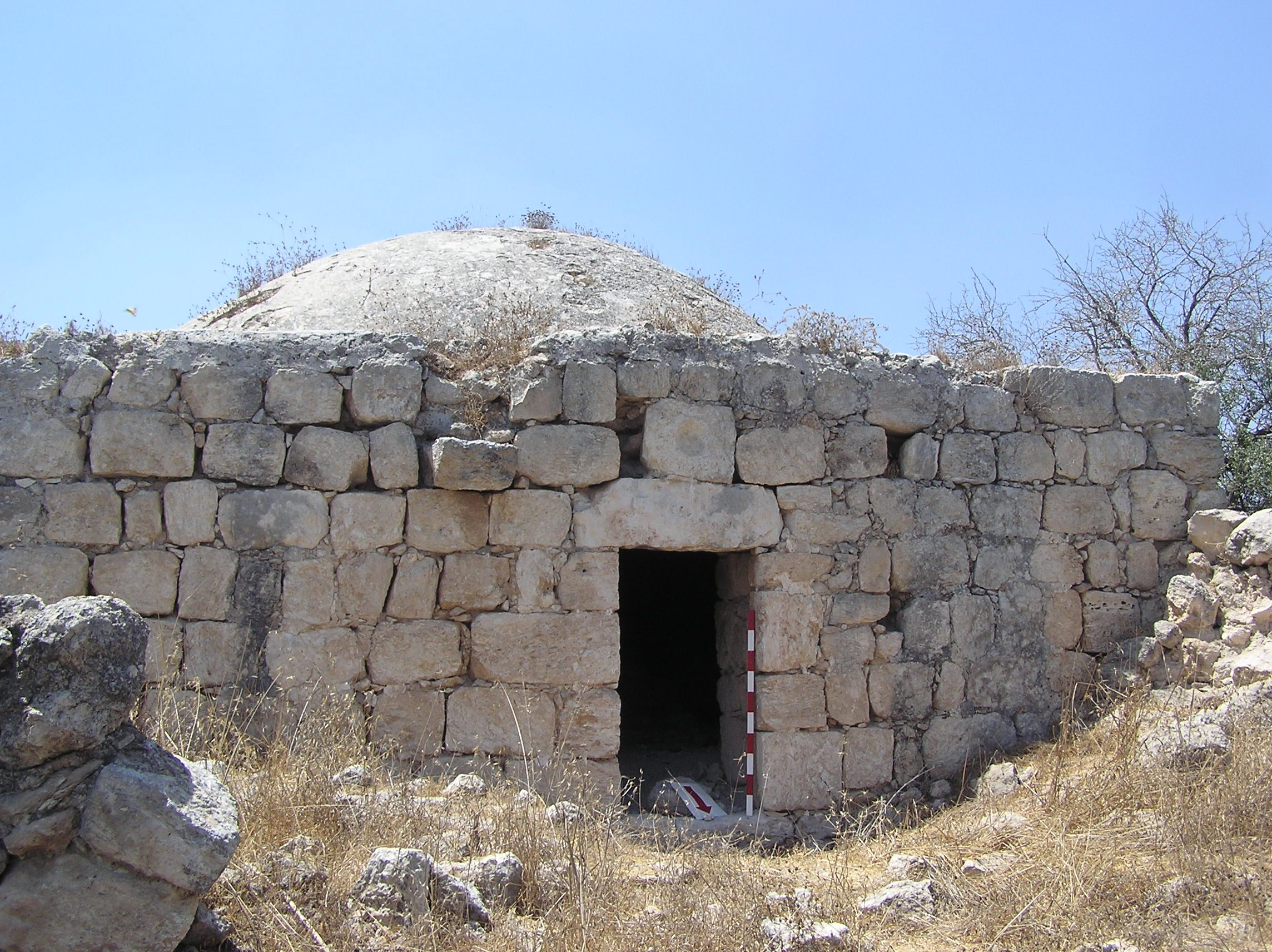
- Maqam of Sheikh 'Usheish
- Etymology: "monastery of the cattle drover"
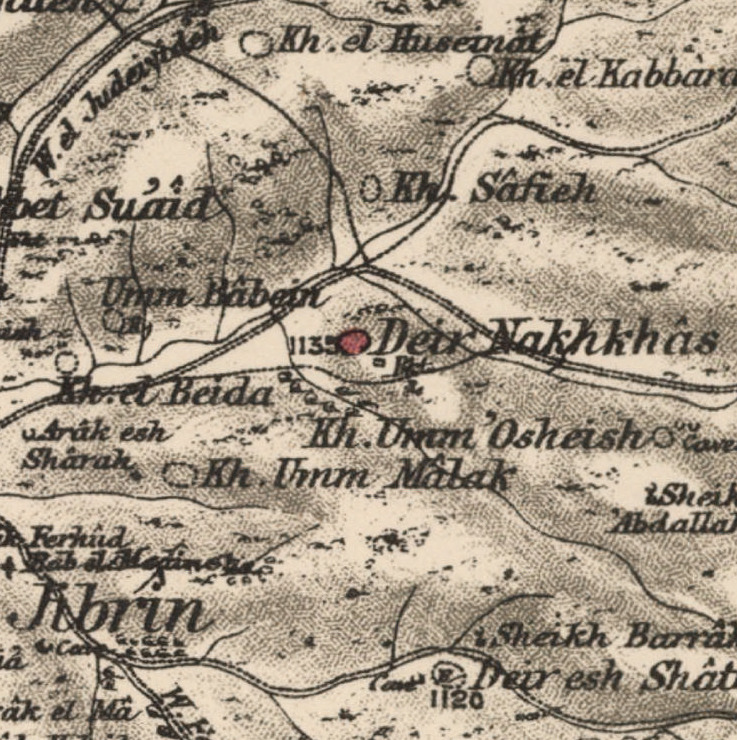
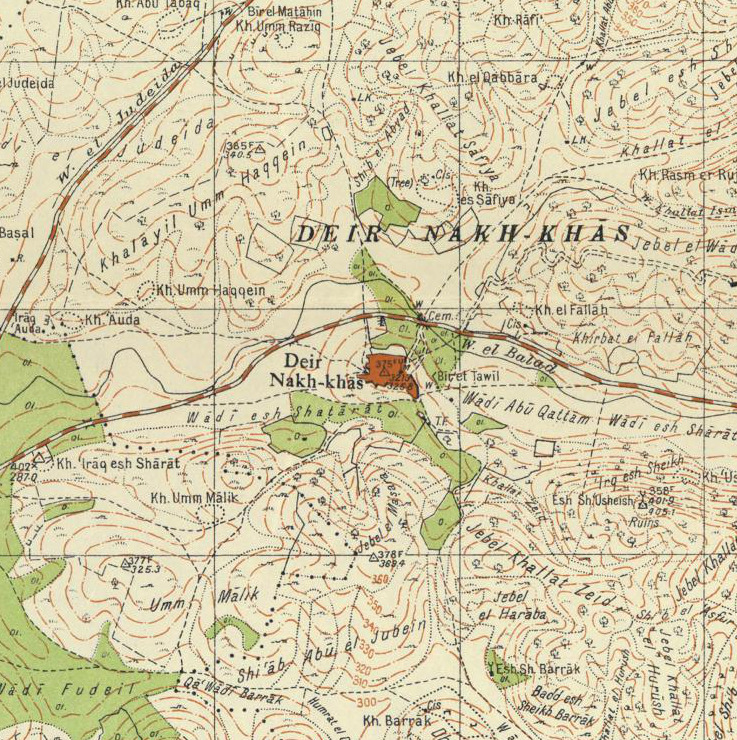
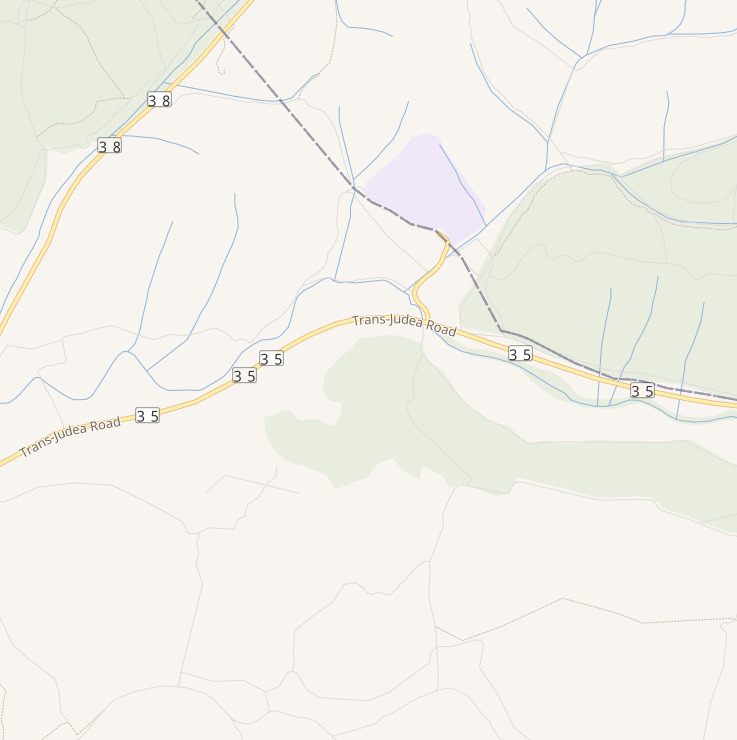
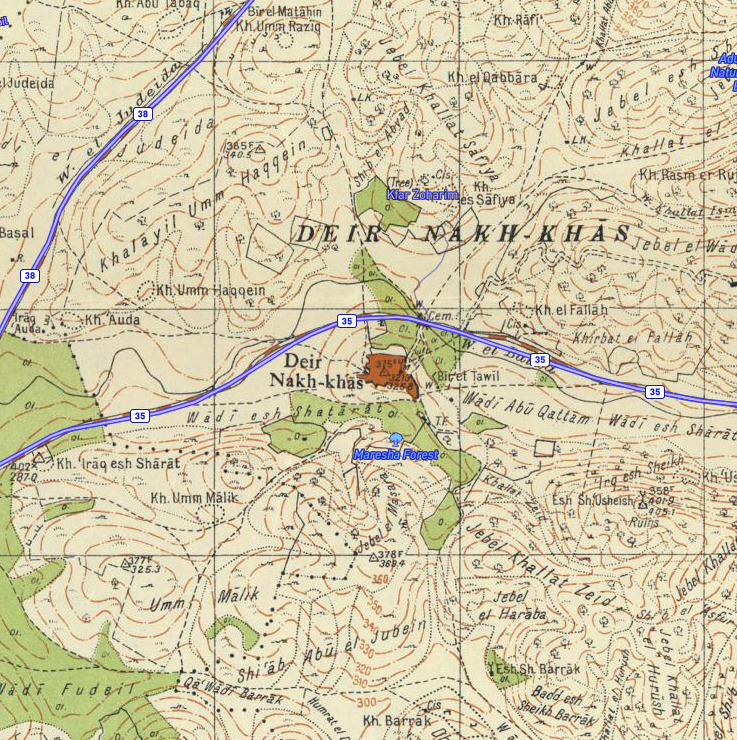
- 1870s map 1940s map modern map 1940s with modern overlay map A series of historical maps of the area around Dayr Nakhkhas (click the buttons)

- Location within Mandatory Palestine
- Coordinates: 31°36′57″N 34°55′18″E
- Palestine grid: 142/113
- Geopolitical entity: Mandatory Palestine
- Subdistrict: Hebron
- Date of depopulation: October 29, 1948

Area
  - Total: 14,476 dunams (14.476 km^{2}; 5.589 sq mi)

Population (1945)
  - Total: 600
- Cause(s) of depopulation: Military assault by Yishuv forces

Dayr Nakhkhas (Arabic: دير النخّاس, Deir Nakh-khâs) was an Arab village located 20 km northwest of Hebron, overlooking Wadi Bayt Jibrin to the north.

== Location ==
Dayr Nakkhas was situated on the road to Hebron about two miles east of Bayt Jibrin. Perched on a hill, an open corn valley lay below the village. Located in an area rich in archaeological sites, in the land area that belonged to the village, there were some 15 sites, including the village itself (which was built on an earlier ancient site).

== History ==
During the Crusader era it was known as Deir Nachar, and it was a casale under the Knights Hospitallers. This was confirmed in 1136, by the King of Jerusalem, Fulk.

=== Ottoman era ===
In a 1596 census for the Ottoman Empire, it is recorded that Dayr Nakhkhas was part of nahiya (subdistrict) of Halil [i.e. al-Khalil, or Hebron], under the liwa' (district) of Jerusalem, with a population of 13 Muslim households; an estimated 72 persons. The inhabitants paid taxes on a number of crops, including wheat, barley, olives, as well as on goats and beehives; a total of 4,000 akçe.

In 1863 Victor Guérin noted about the village: "This village is located on a mountain whose flanks were once exploited as quarries. The lower part of some houses are made with beautiful antique stones. A very deep well, partly built and partly dug out of the rock, is also dated from antiquity. On the slopes of the hill, where the village occupies the summit, grows olive and fig trees; here and there are also a number of artificial caverns which once served as dwellings or storehouses."

I the PEF's Survey of Western Palestine (SWP) the name of the village is transcribed, "Deir Nakhkhâs", and translated as, "the monastery of the cattle drover.

In 1883, SWP described it as; "A very small village perched on a high, steep hill, looking down on the valley to the north. "This is possibly Ir-Nahash (i Chronicles iv. 12)." It is also said to contain, "A ruined birkeh and a cave with 250 niches."

=== British Mandate era ===
In the 1922 census of Palestine conducted by the British Mandate authorities, Deir Nakhas had a population of 336 inhabitants, all Muslims, increasing in the 1931 census to 451, still all Muslim, in a total of 86 inhabited houses.

The village was rectangular in layout, with houses built of stone, expanding along and towards the road linking it to Hebron. The children attended schools in the neighbouring villages.

By the 1945 statistics, the population was recorded at 600 Muslims. In the 1944/45 growing season, a total of 4,887 dunums of village land was planted in cereals; 362 dunums were irrigated or used for orchards, while 22 dunams were built-up (urban) land.

=== 1948, and aftermath ===
During the 1948 Arab-Israeli war, Dayr Nakhkhas was defended by the Egyptian Army. The village was depopulated as a result of a military assault by Israeli forces on October 29, 1948.

Following the war the area was incorporated into the State of Israel. The land that had belonged to Dayr Nakhkhas was left undeveloped; the Palestinian historian Walid Khalidi described the village land in 1992: "Nothing remains of the village except a few deserted houses and the rubble of others. One deserted house is made of concrete and has rectangular windows and a flat roof. It is marked with Arabis graffiti and stands in the midst of tall wild grasses and weeds. There is a fenced-in cave. The surrounding land is cultivated by Israeli farmers."

== Gallery ==
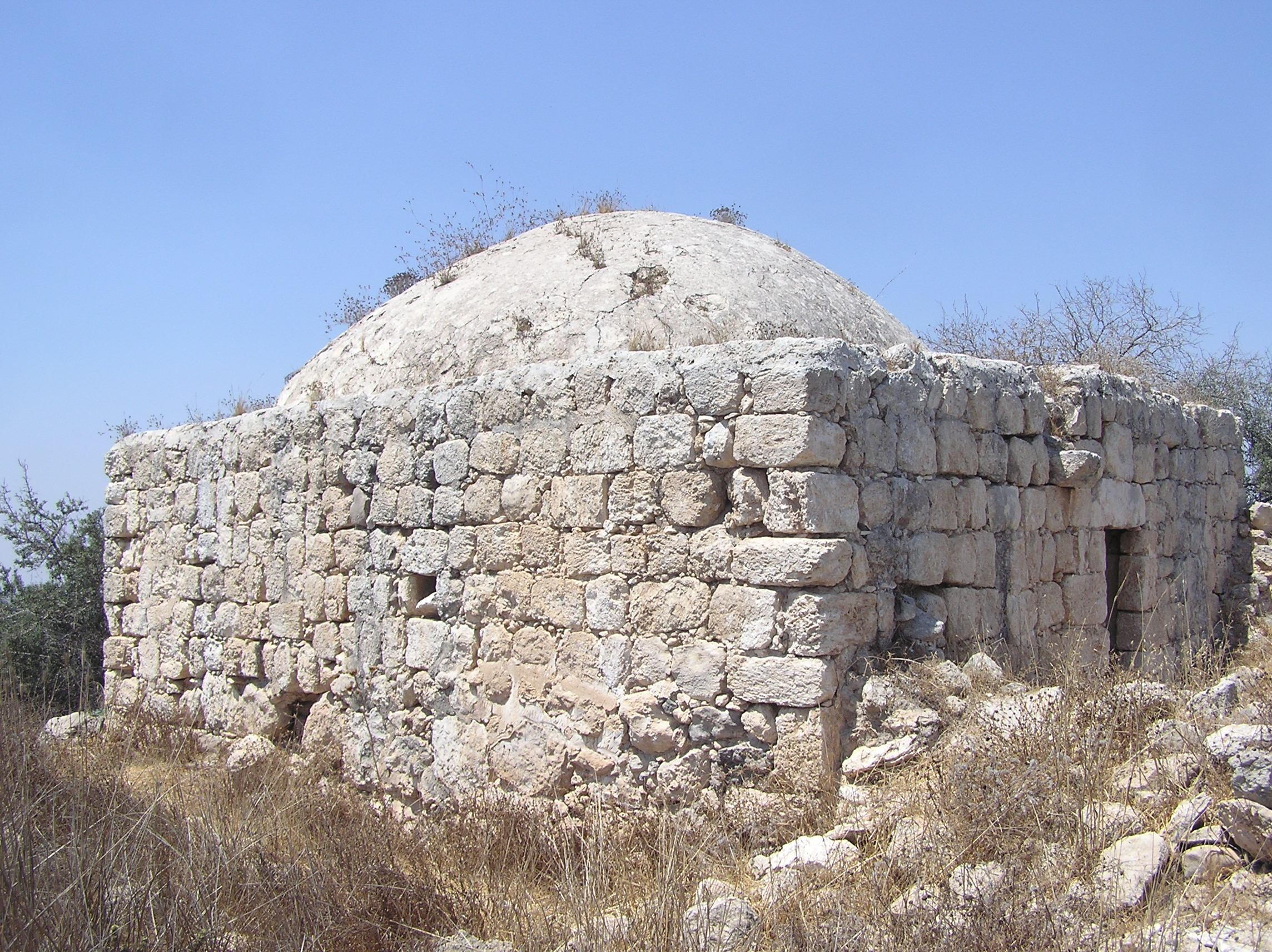
Maqam of Sheikh Usheish

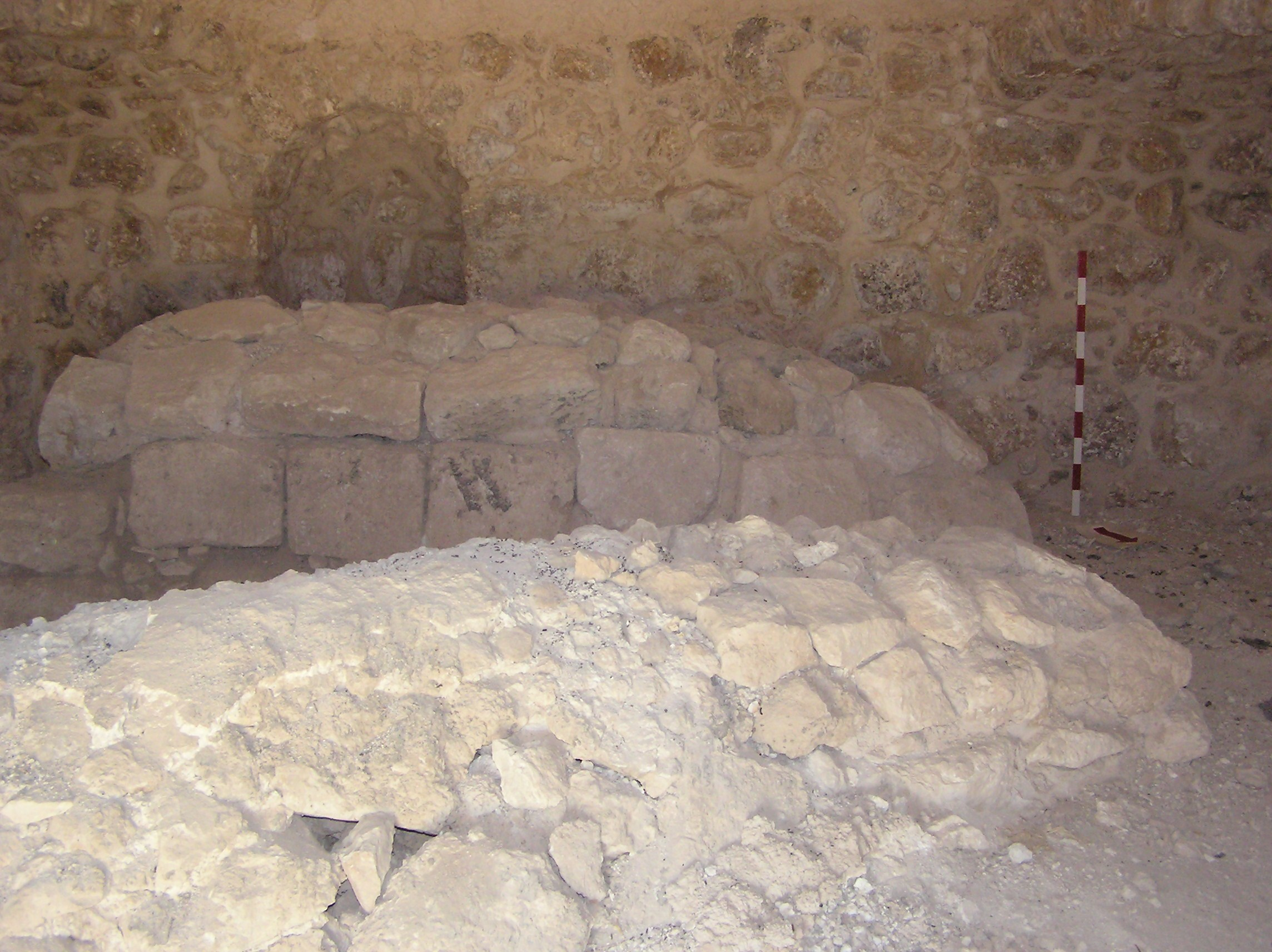
Interior, Maqam of Sheikh Usheish

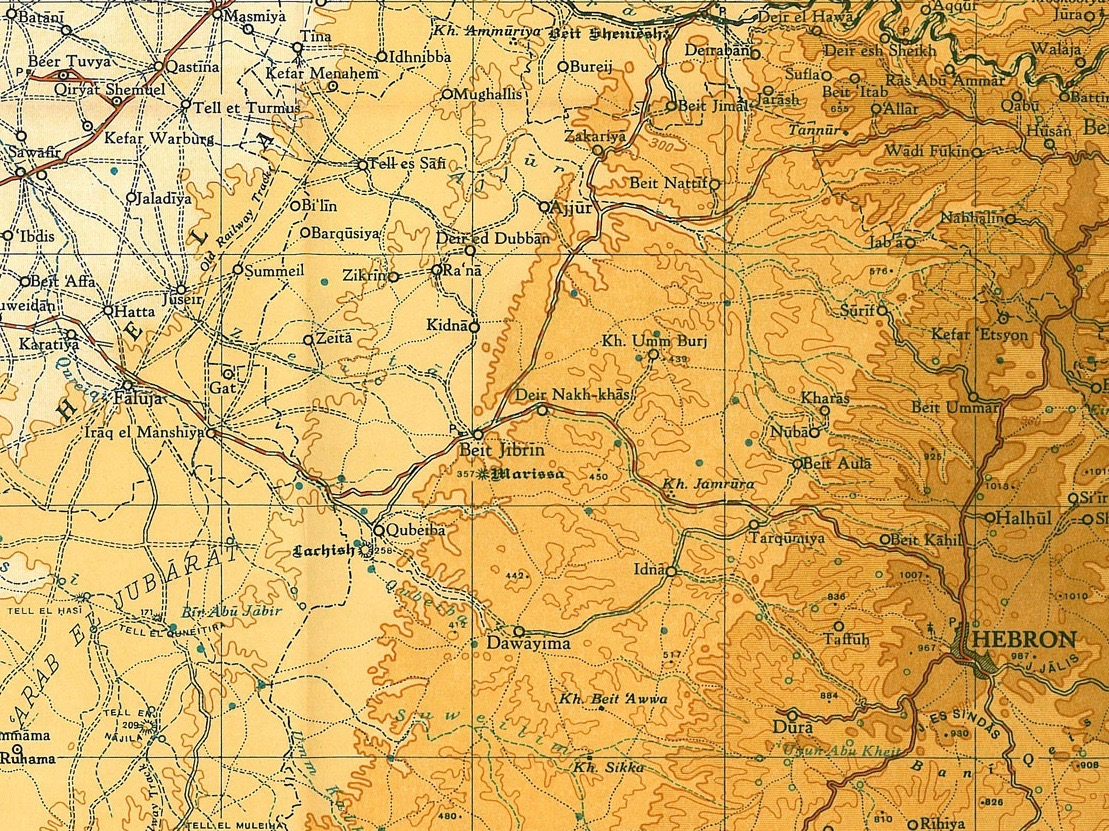
Dayr Nakhkhas 1945 1:250,000

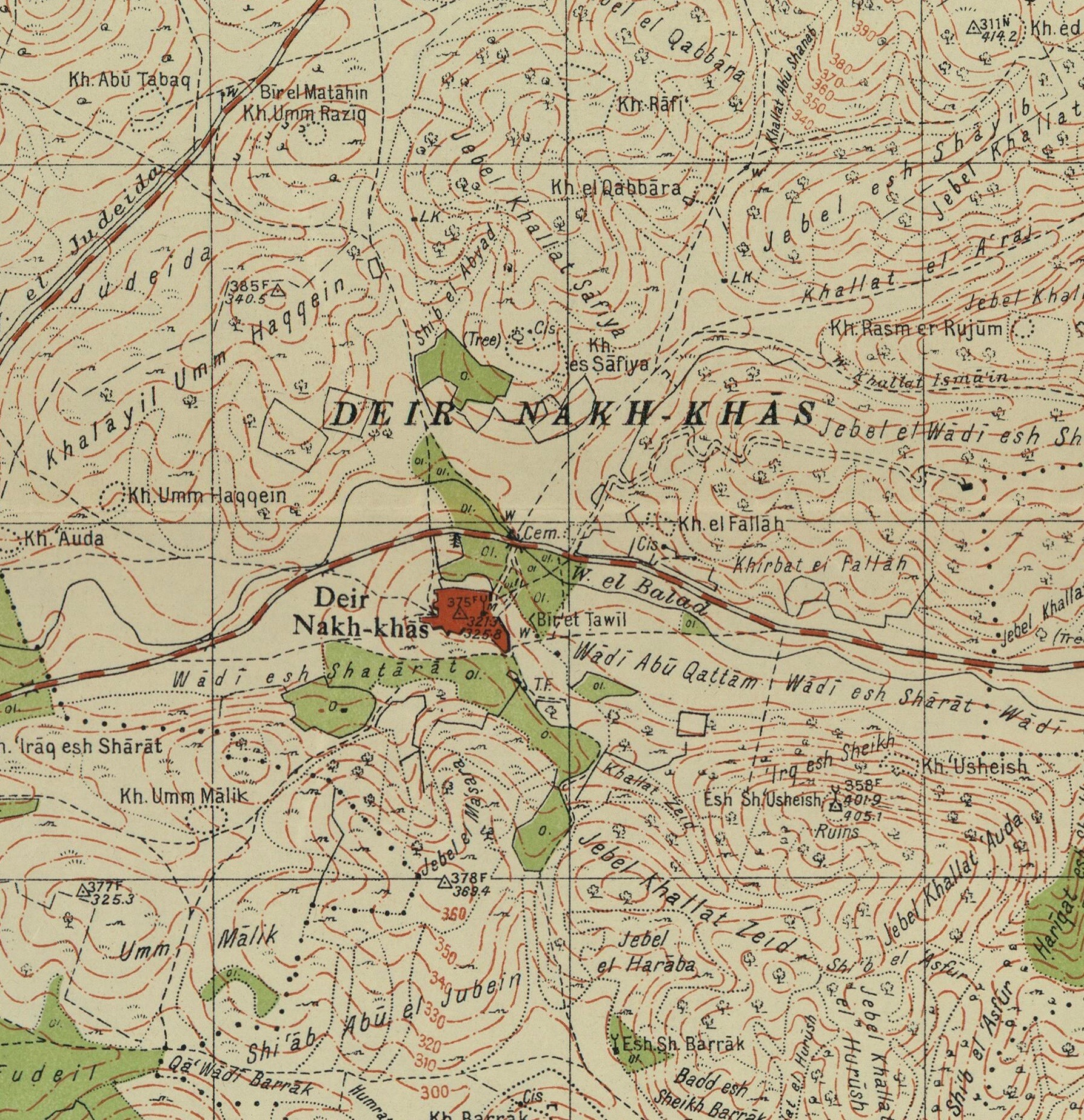
Dayr Nakhkhas 1947 1:20,000

== Bibliography ==
- Alexander, W.L.; Kitto, J. (eds.). A cyclopædia of biblical literature (3rd ed.). 1864.
- Barron, J.B., ed. (1923). Palestine: Report and General Abstracts of the Census of 1922. Government of Palestine.
- Conder, C.R. (1878). Tent work in Palestine. A record of discovery and adventure Vol. 1. Internet.archive (from Harvard collection).
- Conder, C.R.; Kitchener, H.H. (1883). The Survey of Western Palestine: Memoirs of the Topography, Orography, Hydrography, and Archaeology. Vol. 3. London: Committee of the Palestine Exploration Fund.
- Conder, C. R. (1890). "Norman Palestine". Quarterly Statement - Palestine Exploration Fund. 22: 29–37. doi:10.1179/peq.1890.22.1.29.
- Delaville Le Roulx, J. (1894). Cartulaire général de l'Ordre des Hospitaliers (in Latin). Vol. 1. Paris.
- Delaville Le Roulx, J. (1906). Cartulaire général de l'Ordre des Hospitaliers (in Latin). Vol. 4. Paris.
- Department of Statistics (1945). Village Statistics, April, 1945. Government of Palestine.
- Guérin, V. (1869). Description Géographique Historique et Archéologique de la Palestine (in French). Vol. 1: Judee, pt. 2. Paris: L'Imprimerie Nationale.
- Hadawi, S. (1970). Village Statistics of 1945: A Classification of Land and Area ownership in Palestine. Palestine Liberation Organization Research Center.
- Hütteroth, W.-D.; Abdulfattah, K. (1977). Historical Geography of Palestine, Transjordan and Southern Syria in the Late 16th Century. Erlanger Geographische Arbeiten, Sonderband 5. Erlangen, Germany: Vorstand der Fränkischen Geographischen Gesellschaft. ISBN 3-920405-41-2.
- Khalidi, W. (1992). All That Remains: The Palestinian Villages Occupied and Depopulated by Israel in 1948. Washington D.C.: Institute for Palestine Studies. ISBN 0-88728-224-5.
- Mills, E., ed. (1932). Census of Palestine 1931. Population of Villages, Towns and Administrative Areas. Jerusalem: Government of Palestine.
- Morris, B. (2004). The Birth of the Palestinian Refugee Problem Revisited. Cambridge University Press. ISBN 978-0-521-00967-6.
- Palmer, E.H. (1881). The Survey of Western Palestine: Arabic and English Name Lists Collected During the Survey by Lieutenants Conder and Kitchener, R. E. Transliterated and Explained by E.H. Palmer. Committee of the Palestine Exploration Fund.
- Röhricht, R. (1893). (RRH) Regesta regni Hierosolymitani (MXCVII-MCCXCI) (in Latin). Berlin: Libraria Academica Wageriana.
