= Deir al-Dubban =

Deir al-Dubban دير الدبان Dayr ad-Dhubban
- Etymology: "Monastery of the Flies"
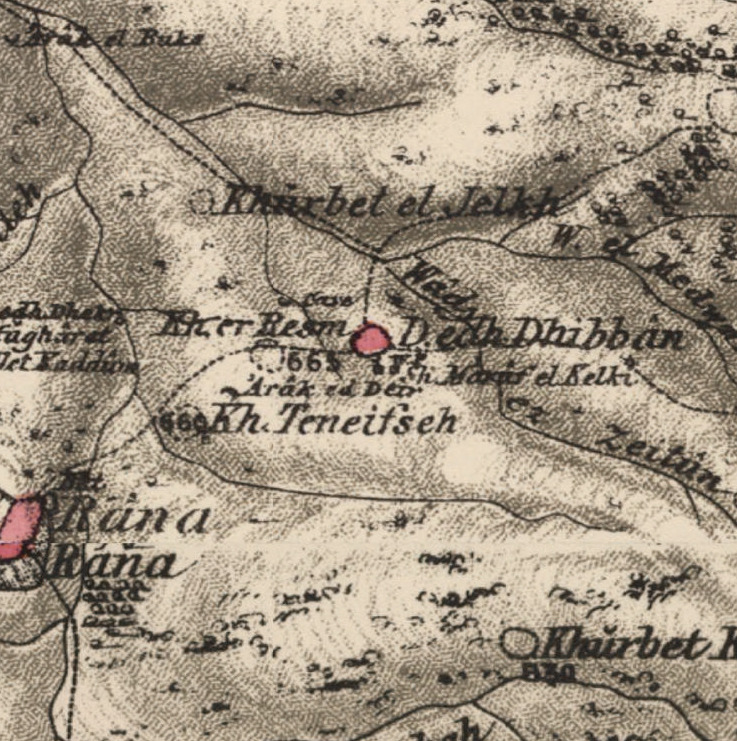
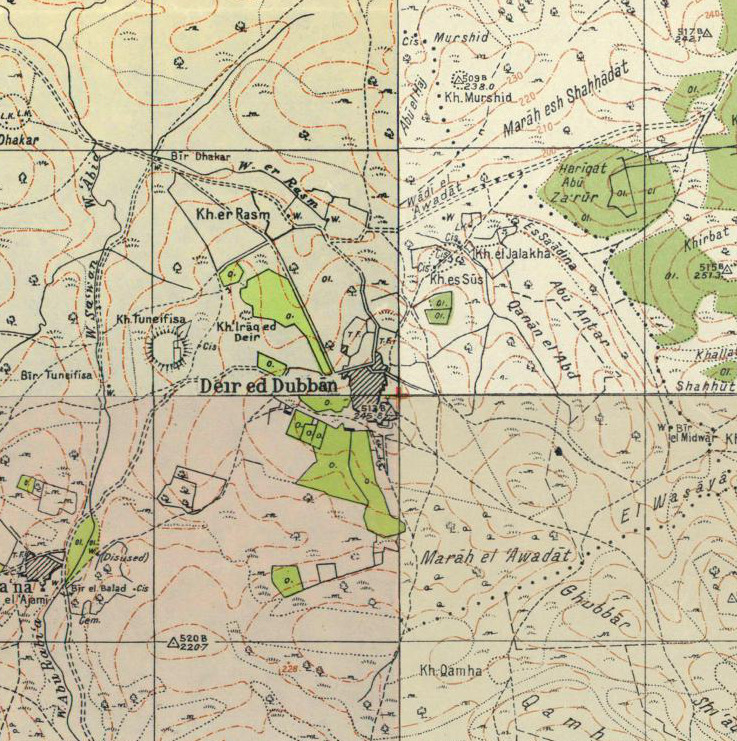
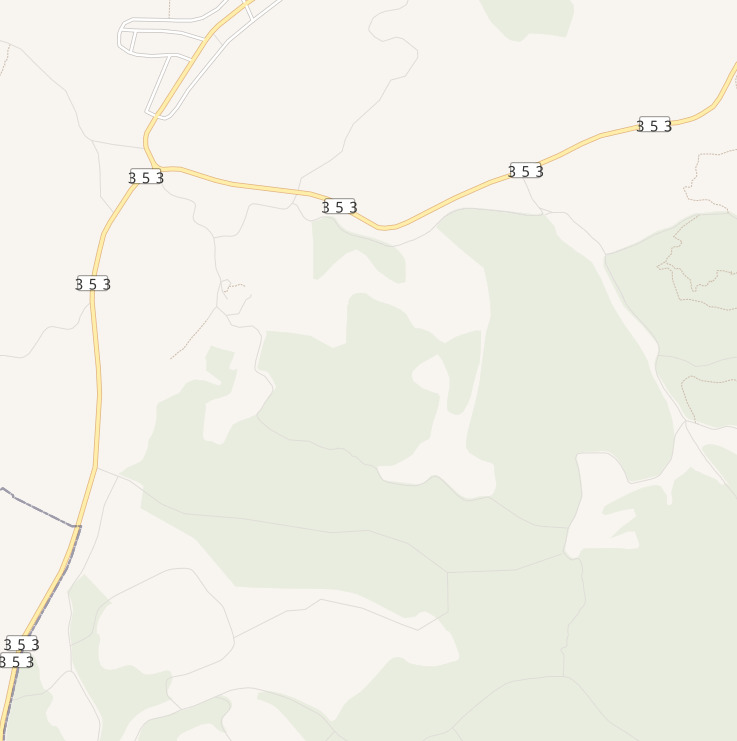
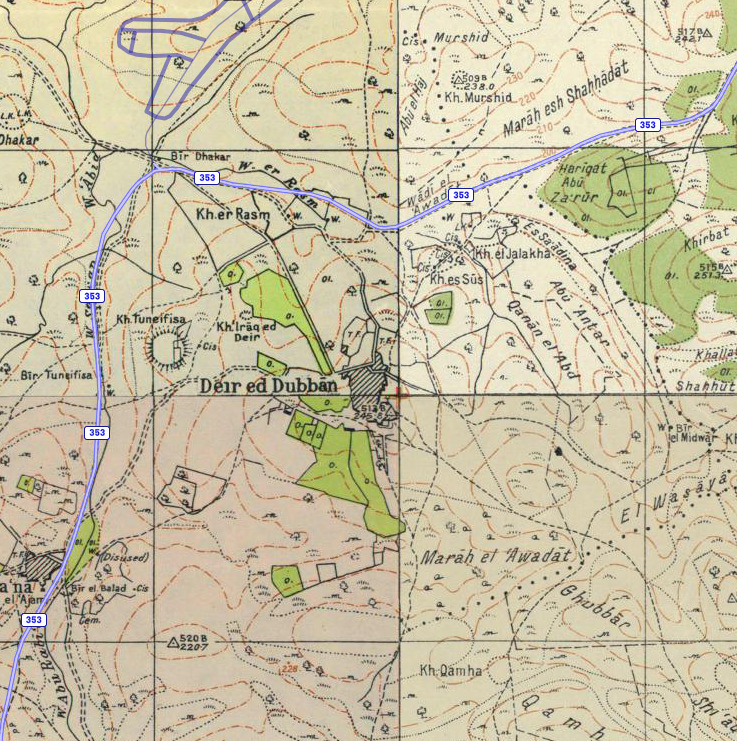
- 1870s map 1940s map modern map 1940s with modern overlay map A series of historical maps of the area around Deir al-Dubban (click the buttons)

- Location within Mandatory Palestine
- Coordinates: 31°40′23″N 34°53′33″E
- Palestine grid: 139/120
- Geopolitical entity: Mandatory Palestine
- Subdistrict: Hebron
- Date of depopulation: October 23–24, 1948

Area
  - Total: 7,784 dunams (7.784 km^{2}; 3.005 sq mi)

Population (1945)
  - Total: 730
- Cause(s) of depopulation: Military assault by Yishuv forces
- Current Localities: Luzit, Britannia Park

Deir al-Dubban (Arabic: دير الدبان, from Dayr ad-Dhubban, literally, the "Monastery of the Flies") was a small Palestinian village 26 kilometers (16 mi) northwest of Hebron, near the modern village of Luzit, between Jerusalem, and Ashkelon. The village was depopulated in the 1948 Palestine War.

== History ==
A possible reason behind Deir al-Dubban's name is that its ancient inhabitants worshiped Ba'l Zabub ("Lord of the Flies"), a chief Canaanite deity in the region.

Moshe Sharon, professor of early Islamic history at Hebrew University, has examined the inscriptions in the caves of Deir al-Dubban. He dates them from early 8th century CE to early 10th century CE.

=== Ottoman era ===
The village was incorporated into the Ottoman Empire in 1517 with all of Palestine, and in 1596 it appeared in the tax registers as being in the Nahiya ("Subdistrict") of Al-Quds of the Liwa ("District") of Al-Quds, with a population 72 Muslim households, an estimated 396 persons. The villagers paid a fixed tax rate of 33,3% on wheat, barley, olive trees, fruit trees, vineyards, goats and beehives; a total of 14,005 akçe. Half of the revenue went to a waqf.

E. Robinson reports passing Deir al-Dubban in 1838, on his way to examine caverns nearby. He noted it as a Muslim village, located in the Gaza district. Although inconclusive, Robinson, by taking Eusebius' location of the biblical Gath as being five Roman miles north of Eleutheropolis (Beit Gubrin) towards Diospolis (Lod), thought that Deir al-Dubban may have been the site of Gath-Rimmon.

The French explorer Victor Guérin visited the village in 1863, and found that it had seven or eight poor Fellahin families, while an official Ottoman village list of about 1870 showed that Der Dubban had 24 houses and a population of 79, though the population count included only men. In 1882 the PEF's Survey of Western Palestine (SWP) noted that the village appeared as being on an ancient site, and that there were large caverns. It had a with a well to the west. Charles Warren found inscriptions, apparently in Syriac in the caves, one with a Byzantine cross engraved above it.

In 1896 the population of Der ed-dibban was estimated to be about 249 persons.

=== British Mandate era ===
During the British Mandate period, Deir al-Dubban's main economic activities were rainfed agriculture and animal husbandry. As a customary practice, farmland was divided into eastern and western sections; one section was planted on during a particular season, while the other remained a fallow. Adjacent to the farmland were fig orchards and grape vineyards.

In the 1922 census of Palestine conducted by the British Mandate authorities, Dair al-Dubban had a population of 454 inhabitants, all Muslims, increasing in the 1931 census of Palestine to 543, still all Muslim, in 112 inhabited houses.

In the 1945 statistics, Deir al-Dubban had a population of 730 Muslims and a land area of 7,784 dunams. 5358 dunams were used for cereals, while 58 dunams were built-up (urban) land.

=== 1948 and aftermath ===
During the 1948 Arab-Israeli War, on October 24, Israeli forces belonging to the Givati Brigade captured Deir ad-Dubban in a northward push in Operation Yoav. Most of the inhabitants fled the village before the arrival of Israeli forces, those that remained were expelled. The moshav of Luzit was established on the village's northeastern lands in 1955. According to Palestinian historian Walid Khalidi, "the village's old roads are easily identifiable. There are also remnants of stone terraces and a cave."

== See also ==
- Depopulated Palestinian locations in Israel

== Bibliography ==
- Barron, J.B., ed. (1923). Palestine: Report and General Abstracts of the Census of 1922. Government of Palestine.
- Conder, C.R.; Kitchener, H.H. (1882). The Survey of Western Palestine: Memoirs of the Topography, Orography, Hydrography, and Archaeology. Vol. 2. London: Committee of the Palestine Exploration Fund.
- Department of Statistics (1945). Village Statistics, April, 1945. Government of Palestine.
- Guérin, V. (1869). Description Géographique Historique et Archéologique de la Palestine (in French). Vol. 1: Judee, pt. 2. Paris: L'Imprimerie Nationale.
- Hadawi, S. (1970). Village Statistics of 1945: A Classification of Land and Area ownership in Palestine. Palestine Liberation Organization Research Centre.
- Hartmann, M. (1883). "Die Ortschaftenliste des Liwa Jerusalem in dem türkischen Staatskalender für Syrien auf das Jahr 1288 der Flucht (1871)". Zeitschrift des Deutschen Palästina-Vereins. 6: 102–149.
- Hütteroth, W.-D.; Abdulfattah, K. (1977). Historical Geography of Palestine, Transjordan and Southern Syria in the Late 16th Century. Erlanger Geographische Arbeiten, Sonderband 5. Erlangen, Germany: Vorstand der Fränkischen Geographischen Gesellschaft. ISBN 3-920405-41-2.
- Khalidi, W. (1992). All That Remains: The Palestinian Villages Occupied and Depopulated by Israel in 1948. Washington D.C.: Institute for Palestine Studies. ISBN 0-88728-224-5.
- Mills, E., ed. (1932). Census of Palestine 1931. Population of Villages, Towns and Administrative Areas. Jerusalem: Government of Palestine.
- Morris, B. (2004). The Birth of the Palestinian Refugee Problem Revisited. Cambridge University Press. ISBN 978-0-521-00967-6.
- Palmer, E.H. (1881). The Survey of Western Palestine: Arabic and English Name Lists Collected During the Survey by Lieutenants Conder and Kitchener, R. E. Transliterated and Explained by E.H. Palmer. Committee of the Palestine Exploration Fund.
- Robinson, E.; Smith, E. (1841). Biblical Researches in Palestine, Mount Sinai and Arabia Petraea: A Journal of Travels in the year 1838. Vol. 2. Boston: Crocker & Brewster.
- Robinson, E.; Smith, E. (1841). Biblical Researches in Palestine, Mount Sinai and Arabia Petraea: A Journal of Travels in the year 1838. Vol. 3. Boston: Crocker & Brewster.
- Robinson, E.; Smith, E. (1856). Biblical Researches in Palestine, and in the Adjacent Regions. Journal of Travels in the Year 1838. Vol. 2. London / Boston: Crocker & Brewster. OCLC 425957927.
- Sharon, M. (2004). Corpus Inscriptionum Arabicarum Palaestinae, Vol. III, D-F. BRILL. ISBN 978-90-04-13197-2.
- Schick, C. (1896). "Zur Einwohnerzahl des Bezirks Jerusalem". Zeitschrift des Deutschen Palästina-Vereins. 19: 120–127.
- Socin, A. (1879). "Alphabetisches Verzeichniss von Ortschaften des Paschalik Jerusalem". Zeitschrift des Deutschen Palästina-Vereins. 2: 135–163.
- Warren, C. (1871). "The Plain of Philistia". Quarterly Statement - Palestine Exploration Fund. 3–4: 82–96.
