= Luzit =

Luzit: לוזית (Hebrew)
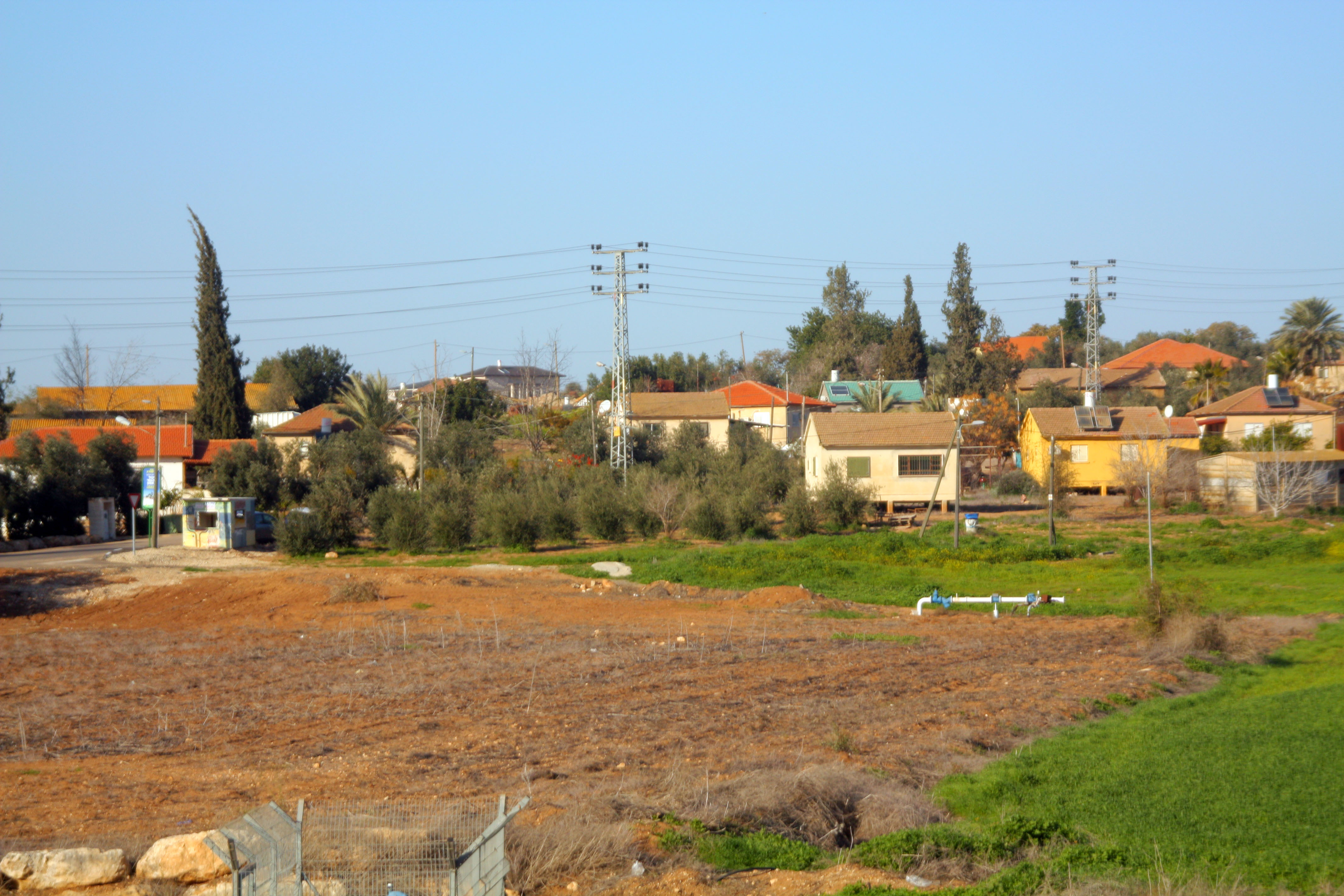

- Location within Jerusalem District
- Coordinates: 31°41′6″N 34°53′11″E
- Country: Israel
- District: Jerusalem
- Council: Mateh Yehuda
- Affiliation: Moshavim Movement
- Founded: 1955
- Founder: North African Jews
- Population (2024): 881

Luzit (Hebrew: לוּזִית, lit. 'Almond Tree') is a moshav in central Israel. Located between Beit Shemesh and Kiryat Gat, it falls under the jurisdiction of Mateh Yehuda Regional Council. In 2024 it had a population of 881.

== History ==
The village was established in 1955 by Sephardic Jewish immigrants and refugees from North Africa, led by Shalom de Palenzuela Levi-Kahana. It was initially named Dir Duban Bet after the depopulated Arab village of Deir al-Dubban, and later renamed Luzit after almond trees, which are common in the area.
