= Gal On =

Kibbutz in southern Israel

Gal On: גל און (Hebrew); جال أون (Arabic)
- Location within Ashkelon region of Israel Location within Israel
- Coordinates: 31°37′59″N 34°50′53″E
- Country: Israel
- District: Southern
- Subdistrict: Ashkelon
- Council: Yoav
- Affiliation: Kibbutz Movement
- Founded: 1946
- Founder: Polish Jews
- Population (2024): 669
- Website: www.galon.org.il

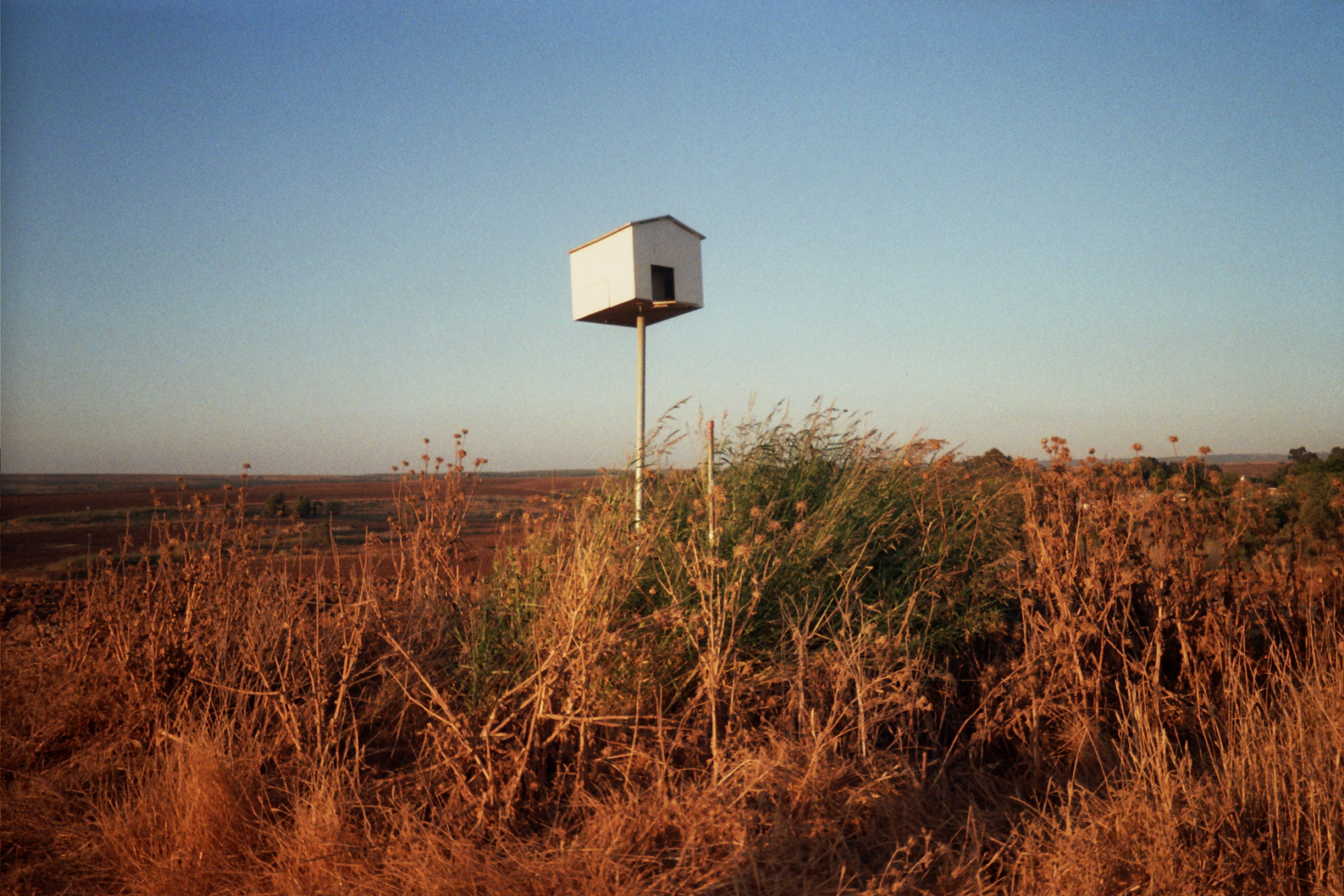
The fields of Gal On

Gal On (Hebrew: גַּלְאוֹן, גל און, lit. Wave of Strength) is a kibbutz in southern Israel. Located in the Shephelah, it falls under the jurisdiction of Yoav Regional Council. In 2024 it had a population of 669.

The kibbutz is associated with the Hashomer Hatzair movement and its Kibbutz Artzi settlement organisation (now part of the Kibbutz Movement). Established as part of the 1946 11 points in the Negev settlement drive, it is located approximately ten kilometers north east of Kiryat Gat and two kilometers east of Beit Guvrin. The kibbutz is administered as part of the Yoav Regional Council.

== Environs ==
Gal On stands on a hill approximately twenty kilometers from the Mediterranean Sea. The hill on which it is located borders the Guvrin stream, an auxiliary of Lachish River. With average rainfall and temperate weather, Gal On’s Mediterranean climate facilitates agricultural production.

== History ==
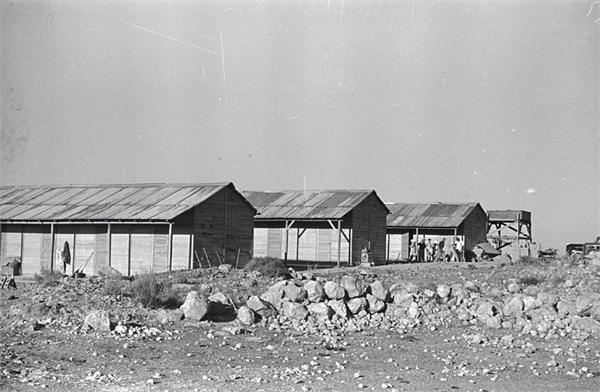
Gal On 1946

The core group, or gar'in, that would eventually found the kibbutz was formed from members of the Hashomer Hatzair Zionist Youth Movement in Poland. The original nine founders of the kibbutz came to the land of Israel (Mandatory Palestine at the time) in 1939, originally settling in Ein HaMifratz near Haifa. Once their group grew to thirty, they transferred to Givat Michael northwest of Ness Ziona to train for settlement (hakhshara). The group worked to build roads as well as harvest fruit in the neighboring orchards in the developing area. Despite their efforts, the group's economic circumstances were dire. Just after the close of Yom Kippur between 5–6 October 1946, the group moved to their current location next to Kibbutz Gat in the Shephelah as one of the 11 points of settlement established in the area that night. The kibbutz was established with the help of funding from Keren Hayesod on land purchased by the Jewish National Fund.

=== Early statehood ===
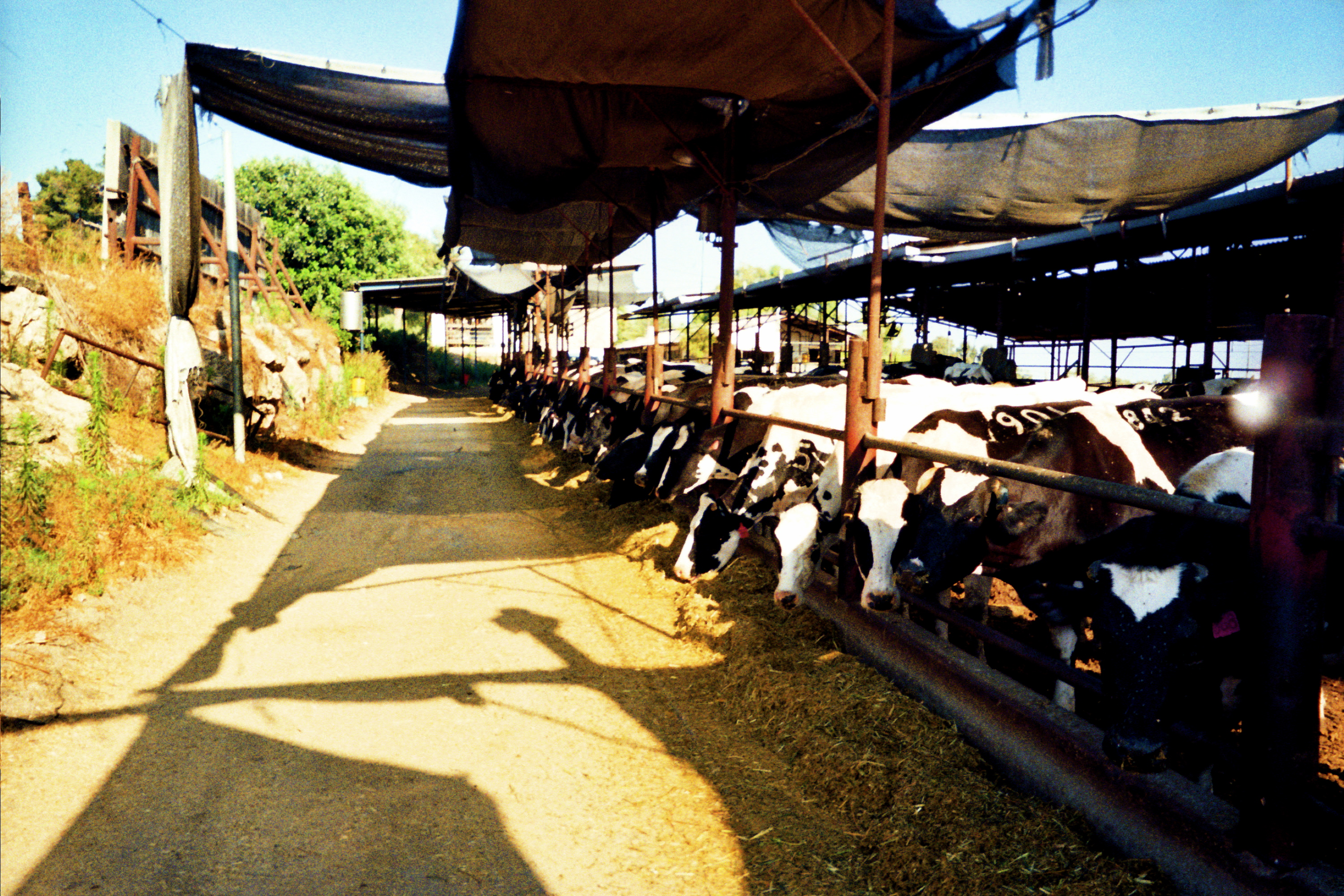
Cows raised at Gal On

During the 1948 Arab–Israeli War, the kibbutz was isolated and attacked by the Egyptian Army. Egyptian troops advanced within a kilometer of Gal On, but efforts by kibbutz members to lay minefields helped defend the kibbutz and maintain Israel's southern front during the war. In late October 1948, the kibbutz served as a base for the Israel Defense Forces' Operation Yoav as it was attacked by Arab forces, resulting in the capture of Bayt Jibrin in the east. In 1949, kibbutz Beit Guvrin was established nearby.

The kibbutz's population was boosted by a group of Holocaust survivors who had arrived on the refugee ship Exodus in 1947. In 1951, a large group of Hashomer Hatzair members arrived from North America. A group of Israeli Hashomer Hatzair members joined ten years later, in 1961. Additionally, the kibbutz also absorbed a small group of members of Mapam from Uruguay.

The economic situation was difficult and exacerbated by a critical lack of water. Gal On had considerably large tracts of land that could not be cultivated because of the shortage. The kibbutz had a well that supplied 60,000 cubic meters of water a year—almost all of which was used for drinking water and daily needs. Only when the Israeli National Water Carrier was completed was it possible to expand the cultivated areas.

=== 2000–present ===
In the year 2000, the kibbutz faced economic hardships: The kibbutz was losing money, and kibbutz children were leaving for the cities. Consequently, Gal On members decided to change its ways. Kibbutz members decided to adopt a new "security net." This stabilized the economic situation, but had little effect on demographics. Although more kibbutz children are staying to live on the kibbutz, few become kibbutz members.

== Archaeology: Canaanite fortress ==
In 2020, a 12th-century BCE Canaanite fortress excavated near Gal On was opened to public.

== Industry and agriculture ==
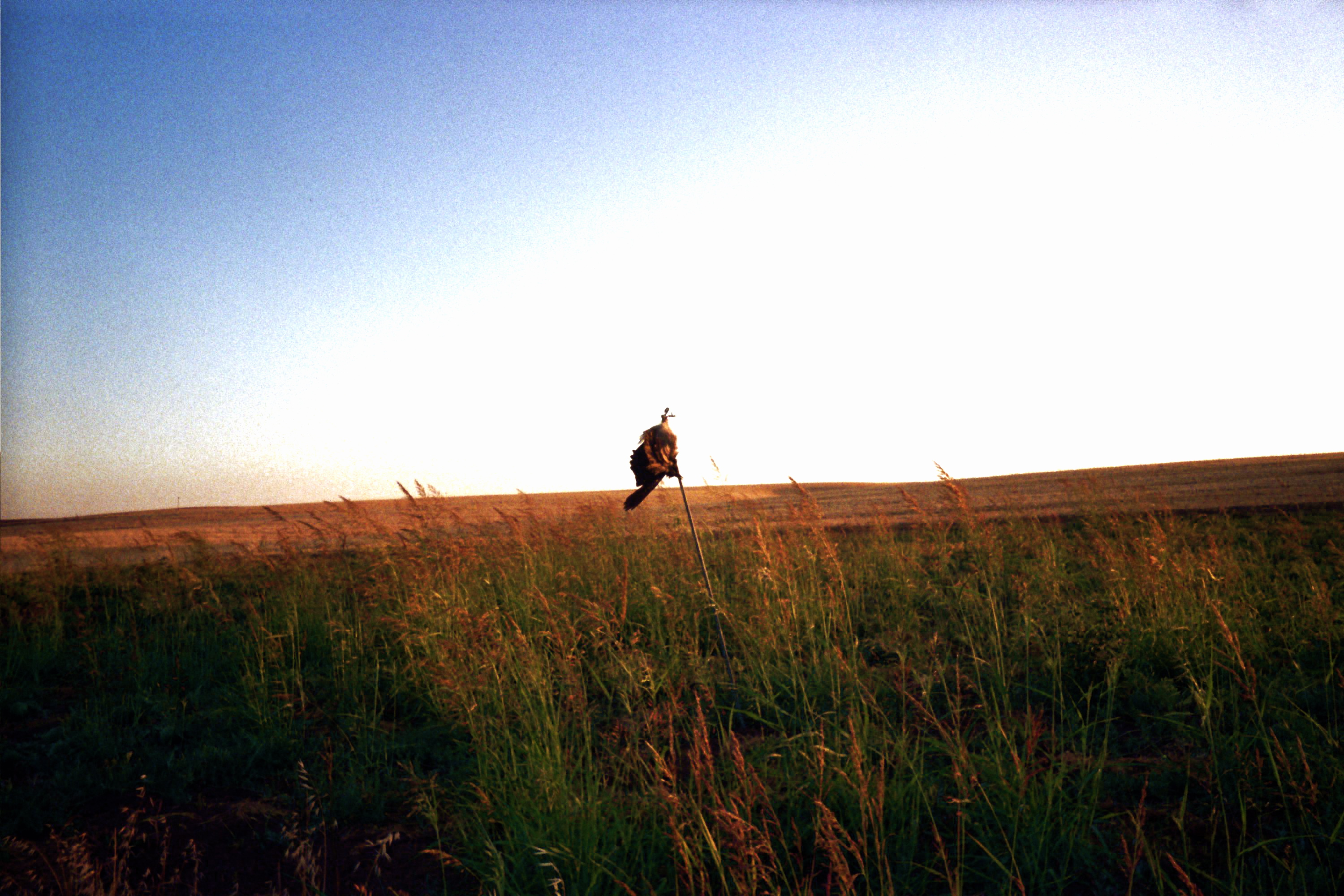
Bedouins place dead hawks in the fields for good luck

A factory was established in the first days of the kibbutz, which was, at the time, the first factory in the country that produced steel tools using modern methods. After many years, the factory was shut down and a box factory was established in its place, but it too eventually closed. Years later, the kibbutz bought a fan factory that was for sale in Ramla. This factory played an important role in the kibbutz economy for many years, until the fan market was inundated by cheap Chinese fans. The factory was converted to electrical motor production, but it too succumbed to the Chinese market and closed down. Today, the kibbutz survives mainly on income from agriculture and the salaries of kibbutz members working outside the kibbutz. Primary crops include wheat, watermelons, avocado and jojoba oil. The kibbutz also raises cows and chickens.

== Notable people ==
- Itzhak Brik (born 1947), Israeli general
