= Khirbet el-Ein =

Archaeological site in central Israel

- خربة العين (Arabic)
- חורבת אל-עין (Hebrew)
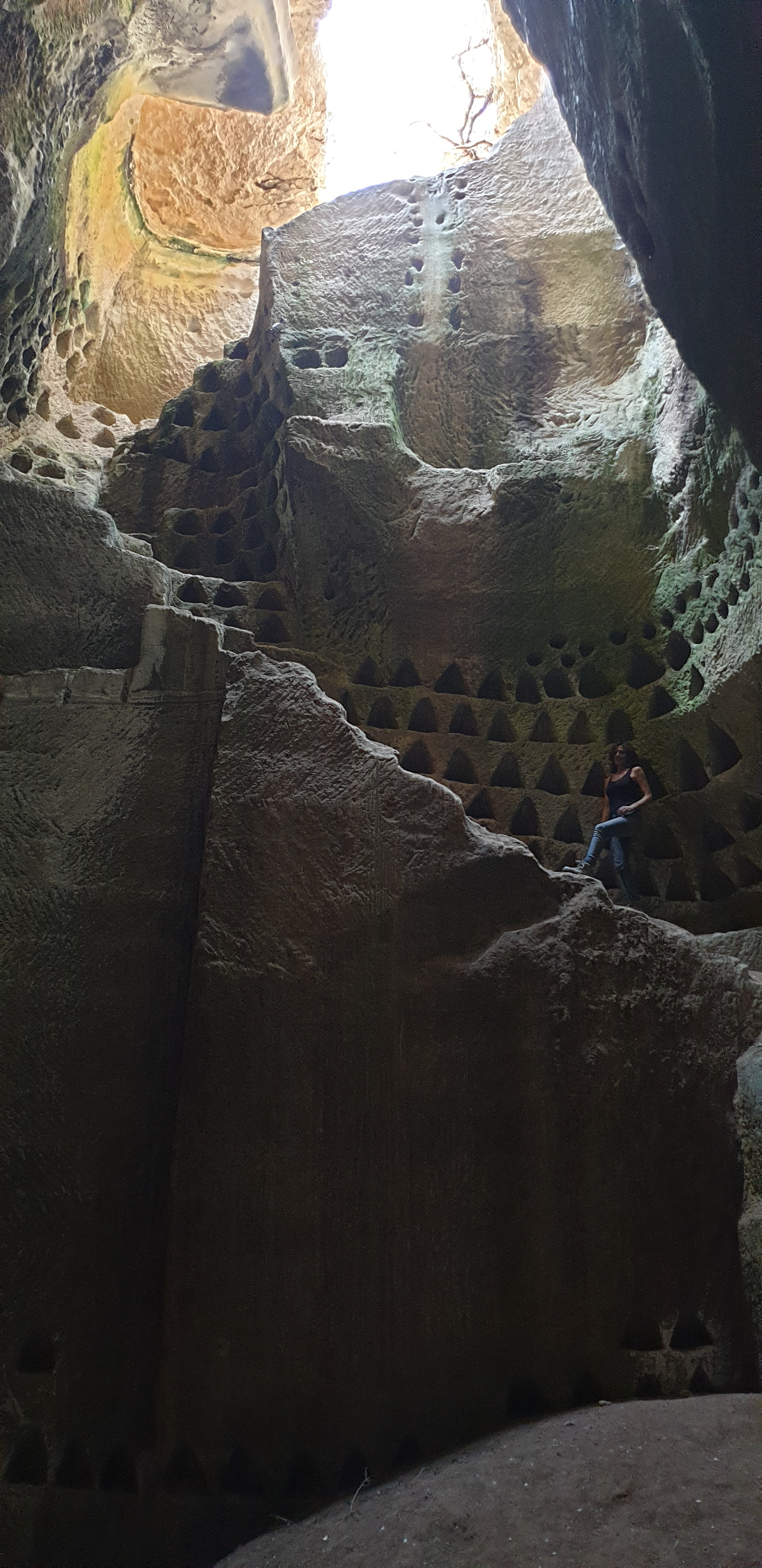
- rock-cut columbarium at Khirbet el-Ein
- Interactive map of Khirbet el-Ein
- 31°37′31″N 34°54′49″E
- Type: settlement
- Etymology: "Ruin of the spring" (Arabic)
- Periods: Hellenistic, Roman, Byzantine and Early Islamic periods
- Location: Israel
- Region: Judaean Lowlands (Shephelah)
- Nearest city: Beit Guvrin

History
- Original use: Settlement, agricultural and quarrying installations

Site notes
- Architectural styles: Rock-cut caves; hiding complexes; quarries; columbaria; rock-cut tombs
- Archaeologists: R. A. Stewart Macalister; Boaz Zissu; Yotam Zissu; Eitan Klein; Shemesh Ya'aran; Omri Gaster
- Discovered: 1899–1900 (surveyed by Macalister)

Khirbet el-Ein (Arabic: خربة العين, lit. 'ruin of the spring'; Hebrew: חורבת אל-עין) is an archaeological site located in the Judaean Lowlands (Shephelah) in modern-day Israel, near the ancient sites of Tel Goded and Beit Guvrin. The site consists of two clusters of ruins situated along the Roman road between Beit Guvrin and Jerusalem, named after a spring that once flowed in the valley below the lower cluster.

No above-ground structures survive, and knowledge of the site is based almost entirely on its extensive rock-cut underground remains. First recorded by R. A. Stewart Macalister in 1899–1900 and comprehensively surveyed in 2017 by Boaz Zissu and other researchers, these remains include bell-shaped chalk quarries, an underground olive press, storerooms, columbaria, rock-cut tombs with burial niches (kokhim), and two hiding complexes associated with the Jewish–Roman wars.

The earliest remains date to the Hellenistic period, while evidence from the Early Roman period indicates a Jewish rural settlement that was abandoned during the Bar Kokhba Revolt. Later occupation is attested by Byzantine-period Christian features and Early Islamic-period quarrying and columbarium installations.

== Geography ==
Khirbet el-Ein is located about a kilometer southeast of Tell Goded (also Tell el-Judeidah); The site sits alongside the Roman road linking Beit Guvrin and Jerusalem, and the second milestone on this road was found at its foot. It comprises two clusters of ancient remains, separated by a slope. The smaller, Khirbet el-Ein Upper, occupies a higher elevation south of the divide and covers only 2 to 3 dunams. To its north lies the larger cluster, Khirbet el-Ein Lower, spanning about 30 dunams on terraces overlooking the Nahal Goded riverbed.

The site name is Arabic for "ruin of the spring", likely preserving the memory of a spring that once flowed nearby. During the Roman and Byzantine periods, its waters were collected in a large reservoir and conveyed by channel to the nearby city of Beit Guvrin (Eleutheropolis), which is located three kilometers away, as part of the city's water supply system. The spring later dried up, leaving only a high water table, into which a well was dug below the lower site.

== History ==
The site was apparently settled from the Hellenistic through the Early Islamic periods.

=== Hellenistic period ===
Based on parallels with the nearby city of Maresha, some spaces may date to the Hellenistic period. These include three chambers accessed via a corridor from an upper underground system, and possibly two halls in the lower hiding complex.

=== Early Roman period ===
During the Early Roman period, the site's inhabitants appear to have been Jewish, as indicated by characteristic ethnic markers including ossuaries, stone vessels, a probable mikveh (Jewish ritual bath), and hiding complexes. Jewish occupation continued until the failed Bar Kokhba Revolt (132–136 CE), after which it is unclear whether the site was resettled by a new population immediately following the revolt's suppression or only at a later date. The scattered finds from the hiding systems at Khirbet el-Ein fit the broader pattern whereby hiding complexes throughout Judea reached their greatest sophistication and widest distribution during this period.

=== Byzantine period ===
Carved crosses indicate that the site was inhabited by a Christian population during the Byzantine period.

=== Early Islamic period ===
Occupation during the Early Islamic period is indicated by quarries and columbaria characteristic of the period. Their dating is also based on the observation that the quarrying damaged an earlier carved cross, suggesting that the workers no longer regarded the Christian symbols as sacred.

== Notable findings ==
No standing structures survive above ground at either site, likely because the stone was quarried and reused over the centuries in nearby construction, including at sites such as Beit Guvrin. Consequently, most of what is known about the site derives from its underground spaces.

=== Hiding complexes ===
The largest underground system at the site is the lower hiding complex, which links some thirty hewn spaces over a combined length of about 30 meters. It began as a set of pre-existing spaces later converted into a hiding complex. It includes the remains of an underground olive press, quarries, storerooms, a probable mikveh, and a burial cave with three arcosolia. Its main halls have vaulted, carefully dressed ceilings predating the hiding installations. A cavity in the lower complex contained fragments of storage jars, cooking pots, lamps, and glass bowls dated both to the period between the First Jewish Revolt and the Bar Kokhba Revolt and to the revolt itself. Two graffiti inscriptions reading "JC 1918" and a second reading "AJ" were found in one tunnel, possibly left by soldiers passing through the area at the end of the First World War.

Another hiding complex was discovered in the upper part of the site. It was built around earlier spaces from which two long, branching tunnels extend. The complex had already been recorded by Macalister, but an additional wing was exposed by looters at a point he had marked as blocked; pottery and stone vessels dating to the 1st and 2nd centuries CE were recovered there. During a 2017 survey, a graffito depicting a schematic sailboat accompanied by an undeciphered inscription was discovered in the complex.

=== Quarries and columbaria ===
A cluster of underground bell-shaped quarries was discovered west of the lower hiding complex, with interconnected chambers containing columbarium Another quarry at the site, known as "Space 21", was first recorded by Macalister. It is a deep bell-shaped quarry containing columbarium niches in which some earlier carved crosses were damaged by the cutting of the niches.

The "Asparagus Cave" consists of two connected underground quarries north of the bell-shaped cluster; they preserve rectangular blocks abandoned during quarrying, along with rope-wear grooves used for hauling blocks. Debris layers contained Byzantine and early Islamic pottery, including Gaza–Ashkelon jars and a fragment of a roof tile. Another cave, known as the "Bazbuz Cave", was discovered at the foot of the slope. It consists of five interconnected bell-shaped chambers, each with a narrow opening at its apex. One chamber contains fourteen rows of triangular columbarium niches, while another has three crosses carved at considerable height.

=== Rock cut-tombs ===
A rock-cut burial complex was found near the site, and is believed to have belonged to a Jewish family from the nearby settlement. It comprises an entrance courtyard, a small vestibule, the main burial chamber, and a second chamber apparently abandoned before completion. Long after the tomb fell out of use, a bell-shaped pit was dug into the courtyard. The burial chamber's entrance had once been sealed with a rolling stone; by the time of discovery the stone had cracked and the tomb had already been disturbed in antiquity. The main burial chamber has three burial niches (kokhim) on each of two walls, a design typical of tombs found in and around Jerusalem and Judea in this era.

The chamber's jambs carry a lengthy inscription in Greek letters, arranged in three separate framed sections, which remains undeciphered and may have carried a symbolic or protective purpose. Carved beside the inscription are two schematic images of nefashot, the pillar-like monuments historically built above Jewish tombs to mark them, decorated with simple architectural and plant motifs. Pottery from the vestibule, including a cooking-pot fragment and part of a Roman oil lamp, indicates the tomb remained in use into the early second century CE, around the time of the Bar Kokhba Revolt.

Another burial cave with nine rock-cut niches was also found.

== Research history ==
The underground systems at Khirbet el-Ein were first surveyed in 1899–1900 by R. A. Stewart Macalister on behalf of the Palestine Exploration Fund. In a 1902 publication, he described the hill as featuring "a series of rock-cuttings which yield to none in interest or variety. There are some pits of the common bell-shaped type, a few columbaria, rock-cut graves, and tomb chambers with kokim, none of which, excepting the following examples, call for special notice." Macalister recorded numerous caves and underground systems, though failed to recognize the functions of some.

Little archaeological investigation took place at the site until the mid-1990s, when antiquities looters broke into a burial cave. Two Israel Antiquities Authority (IAA) inspectors tasked with combating antiquities theft, Alon Klein and Avshalom Dadosh, located the cave, and the IAA carried out a site inspection in 1996; archaeologist Boaz Zissu went on to document the tomb and conduct a partial excavation under the Authority's permit.

A comprehensive archaeological survey of the site's underground systems was conducted in 2017; it was led by Boaz and Yotam Zissu of the Bar-Ilan University, Eitan Klein of the Israel Antiquities Authority, Shemesh Ya'aran of the Hebrew University of Jerusalem's Cave Research Center (MALHAM), and Omri Gaster of the Israeli Cave Explorers Club. It identified previously unrecorded installations, and demonstrated that two systems recorded separately by Macalister were in fact connected, forming a single, much larger complex.

== See also ==
- Archaeology of the Bar Kokhba Revolt
- Horvat Midras
- Horvat 'Ethri
- Horvat Burgin
- Khirbet Beit Lei
- Tel Goded
- Tel Lavnin

== Bibliography ==
=== Sources ===
- Bliss, Frederick Jones; Macalister, R. A. Stewart (1902). Excavations in Palestine during the Years 1898–1900. London: Palestine Exploration Fund. pp. 224–237.
- Zissu, Boaz (2005). "A Burial Cave with a Greek Inscription and Graffiti at Khirbat el-'Ein, Judean Shephelah". 'Atiqot. 50: 27–36.
- Zissu, Boaz; Ya'aran, Shemesh; Gaster, Omri; Klein, Eitan; Zissu, Yotham (2020). "A Survey of Rock-Cut Cavities at Khirbet el-'Ain, Northeast of Beit Guvrin" [סקר חללים תת־קרקעיים חצובים בחורבת אל־עין שמצפון־מזרח לבית גוברין]. Bema'aveh HaHar (in Hebrew). 10 (1): 55–89. doi:10.26351/IHD/10-1/3. ISSN 2521-9456.
