= Tell ej-Judeideh =

Ancient archaeological site in the Shfelah

- تل الجديدة תל גודד
- Tel Goded
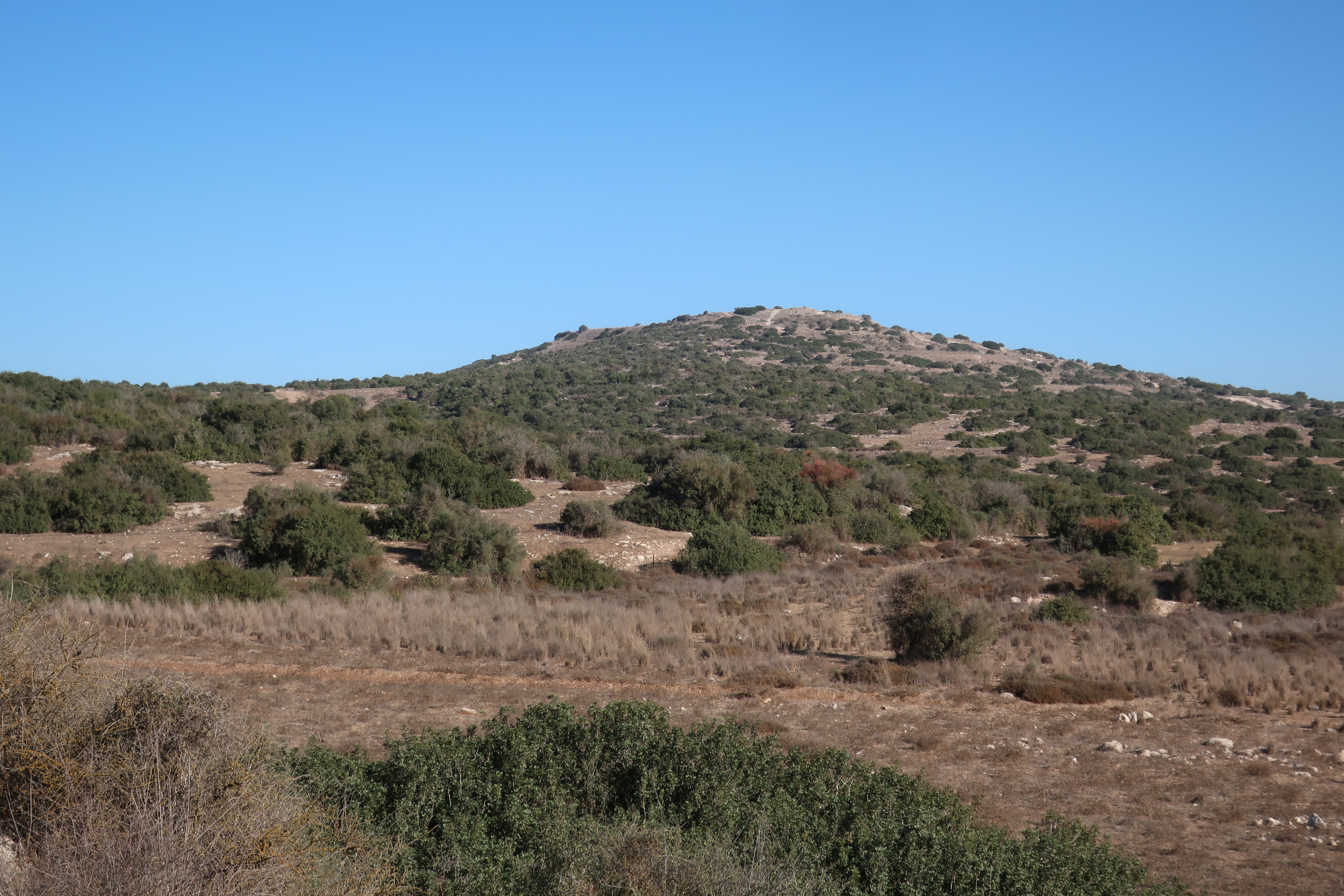
- Tel Goded (Tell ej-Judeideh)

- Location within Israel
- 31°38′00″N 34°55′00″E
- Periods: Middle and Late Bronze Age, Iron Age II, Hellenistic, Roman
- Cultures: Pre-Israelite, Jewish monarchy, Greco-Roman
- Location: Israel
- Region: Shfela
- Grid position: 141/115 PAL

Site notes
- Length: 580 metres (1,900 ft)
- Area: 58 dunams (14 acres)
- Excavation dates: 1900
- Archaeologists: Frederick Jones Bliss, R. A. Stewart Macalister
- Condition: Ruin
- Public access: yes

Tell ej-Judeideh (Arabic: تل الجديدة / خربة الجديدة) is a tell in modern Israel, lying at an elevation of 398 metres (1,306 ft) above sea-level. The Arabic name is thought to mean, "Mound of the dykes." In Modern Hebrew, the ruin is known by the name Tel Goded (תל גודד).

The tell, about 2 kilometres (1.2 mi) north of Beit Guvrin and 9.7 kilometres southeast of Tell es-Safi, was first surveyed by Frederick Jones Bliss in June 1897, and partially excavated by Bliss and R.A.S. Macalister in March 1900. It has tentatively been identified with the biblical Moresheth-Gath, while others think that it might be Ashan of Joshua 15:42, based on the name's textual proximity to Libnah (thought by Albright to possibly be Tel Burna) and to Ether, a site now recognized as Khirbet el-Ater (grid position 138/113 PAL).

Members of the Palestine Exploration Fund visited the site in the late 19th-century and described seeing there "foundations, heaps of stones, and a cistern."

== History ==
Based on its archaeological finds, the site at Tell ej-Judeideh was inhabited in early pre-Israelite times, during the Early Bronze Age, and again during the Iron Age (contemporary with the Philistines), and later fortified during the Roman period, or even perhaps later. However, the site was abandoned during Late Bronze Age (the alleged time of the Biblical conquest of Joshua).

The region wherein the ruin lies was formerly inhabited by the Philistines, and later captured by the Israelite tribes during the period of the monarchy. With the expulsion of the Israelites during the Assyrian and Chaldean military expeditions, the region was then settled by Idumeans (later turned Jews), followed by other ethnicities, the most prominent of whom being Arabic speaking peoples.

== Identification ==
Scholars are divided as to the likely identification of the site. Israeli archaeologist Y. Aharoni, relying upon Eusebius' Onomasticon where he fixes the ancient site of Gath near the Roman road 5 miles (8 km) from Eleutheropolis (Beit Guvrin-Maresha National Park) on the way to Diospolis (Lod), thought that Gath was to be identified with Tell ej-Judeideh, and that Gath and Moresheth-Gath were one and the same place. Others have speculated that Tell ej-Judeideh might be either the biblical Libnah or Gederah of 1 Chronicles 4:23 and Joshua 15:36. Still, others, by a similarity of its name, think that the tell's Arabic name might be a corruption of the name Gedud of Micah 4:14, based on the view that in the Arabic toponyms for ancient sites, the Arab name often preserves the ancient Hebrew name.

In spite of all these attempts of identification, any recognition of a given site will depend upon the positive identification of that site. In this case, Tell ej-Judeideh has yet to be positively identified, as all identifications are only tentative.

== Description of site ==
Tell ej-Judeideh is a natural hill with a level top surrounded on all sides by steep declivities, affording a natural defensive position against attacks. In addition to its natural defenses, the site was formerly surrounded by a late fortification wall, of which only one course of stones remains (now buried in débris), with an occasional area of 2 or 3 courses of stones. The city's wall measured a uniform thickness of 10 feet (3.0 m), except at the places where the wall was strengthened by inner buttresses, and which wall followed the natural contours of the hill. Stones and rubble used for the wall were laid without mortar. Gateways were found at the north, south, and east, while there are signs of an additional fourth gate that once stood on the city's west side. The lower, stone threshold of each gate was made with grooves for inserting an iron bolt, used to lock the gates at night, or in times of emergency.

In the center of the site stands a natural eminence consisting of a complex of structures, believed by Bliss to have once been a Roman villa, replete with pillars that had been torn down, and thought to have served as an atrium and impluvium. As one entered the city from its south side, there was a "paved causeway" leading through the center of the town directly to the central structure. The residential area of the city stretched along the north and south axis of the tell where the rock is practically level, divided only by the raised central part, as it was naturally higher than all the rest. The same residential area once consisted of small houses and recall, according to Bliss, "the labyrinthine Coptic towns on Elephantine and Philac," perhaps a sign of the town's Philistine origins.

At the foot of the mound, an ancient site (called the Horvat tabaq) was also discovered. Under the residential buildings hiding complexes dating to the Bar Kokhba Revolt were curved. These complexes are based on ancient facilities used by the inhabitants of the Roman city. The facilities include storehouses, mikveh, bell caves, cisterns and columbarium facilities. The Jewish village that existed in this place was probably destroyed with the failure of the Bar Kokhba Revolt. On the slope, in the area between the head of Tel Goded and the ruins of Hurvat Tabaq, burial caves from the biblical period, from the Hellenistic and the early Roman periods were located.

Bliss and Macalister who excavated the site in 1900 counted 24 towers that projected inward from the inward face of the wall. Two towers flanked each of the four gates for a total of 8 towers. The remaining 16 other towers were, in the words of Bliss, "mere buttresses of solid masonry." In N. Na'aman's reconstruction of Sennacherib's letter describing his military exploits to suppress the rebellion by Hezekiah, king of Judah. Furthermore the Philistine city of Gath is mentioned in it as being "surrounded with great towers," and which city "stood out on a ridge."

The entire enclosed area of the hill comprises about 58 dunums (14 acres) and stretches to approximately 580 metres (1,900 ft) in length.

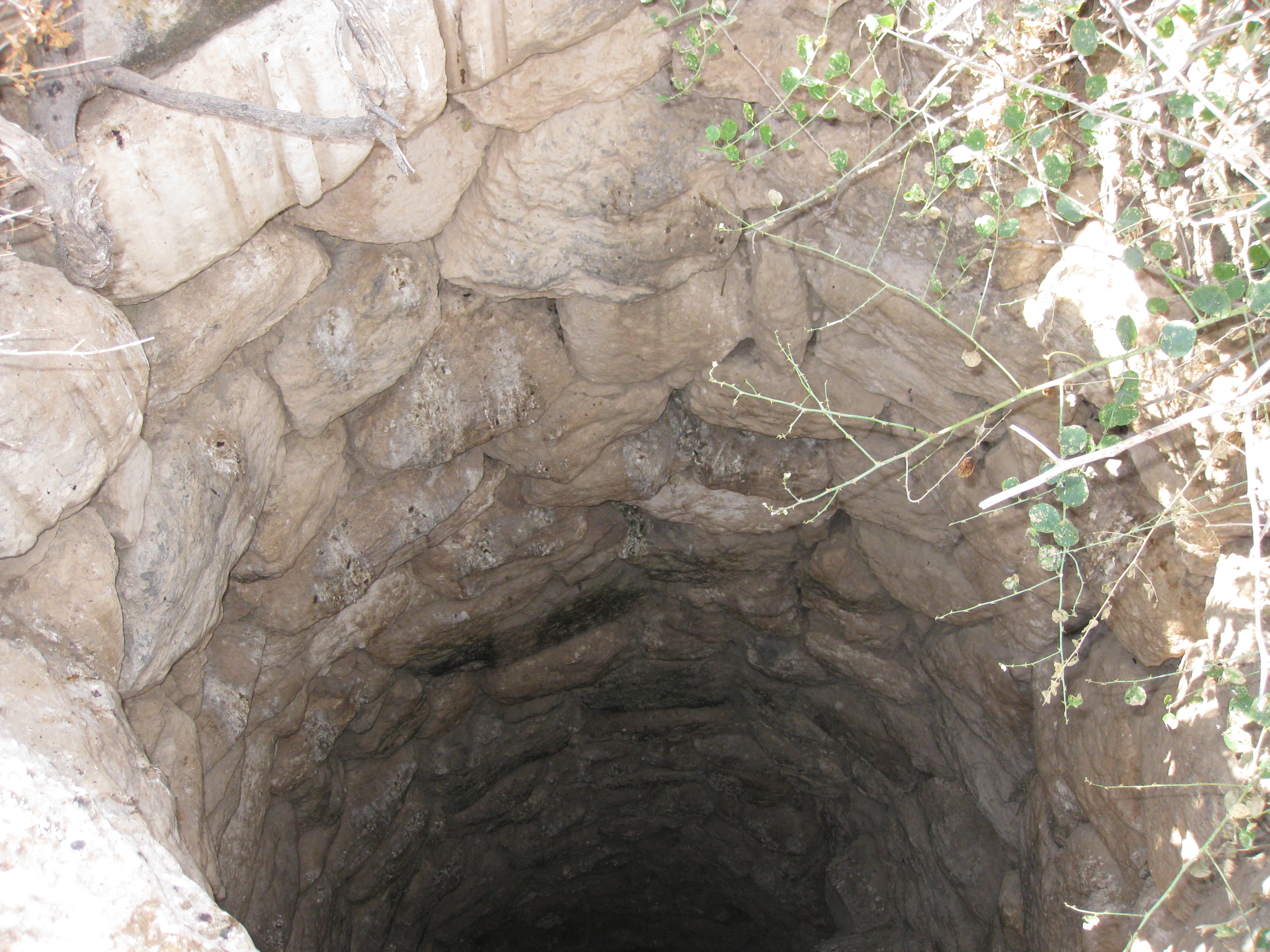
Mouth of well (Bir Rasaq), at the foot of Tell Goded (Tell ej-Judeideh)

== Archaeological finds ==
Excavations at the site revealed three major levels in the sub-strata: the first and earliest being a Canaanite level (Middle Bronze Age); the second being Israelite (Iron II); and the third being Hellenistic-Roman.

Other finds discovered on the site include 37 jar handles with the sealed impression of le-melekh (= "for the king"), dating to the early Israelite period. One seal stamped on a jar handle reads in the Paleo-Hebrew script: הושע צפן = Hošeaʻ Ṣefan; the first name Hošeaʻ written above and the second name Ṣefan written below, separated by a double horizontal line. Another private stamp impressed in Paleo-Hebrew characters shows the name Menaḥem Lebanah (מנחם לבנה). These artefacts were initially kept at the Imperial Museum of Antiquities in Jerusalem, but, later, casts would be made of the originals and the originals sent to Istanbul, at the behest of the Ottoman authority, with only the casts remaining in Jerusalem. Today, they are at the Istanbul Archaeology Museums.

C. Clermont-Ganneau's discovery of the location of the biblical Gezer at Tell el-Jezer led to the cessation of archaeological work at Tell ej-Judeideh for one season, as the newly discovered site was given preferred treatment, and had already begun to yield important archaeological finds.

=== Tombs ===
In 1990, the Israel Antiquities Authority conducted a salvage excavation and survey of rock-cut burial caves on the southern and southeastern slopes of the tell. All of the tombs had previously been looted, so the recovered finds represent only a partial sample of the original contents. The survey documented approximately 25 cave entrances, several cut along the edges of ancient quarries, as well as two entrances to caves left unfinished. Of the caves identified, about 15 dated to the Iron Age II, seven to the Hellenistic and Roman eras, and three to the Byzantine era.

Four caves from the Hellenistic and Early Roman periods were excavated in full. Cave 1 consists of a trapezoidal chamber combining kokhim (burial niches) with arcosolia (arched recesses), a layout otherwise attested only in a small number of mid-1st-century-CE tombs in the necropolis of Jerusalem during the late Second Temple period. Ossuary fragments and pottery date the cave to the first and second centuries CE, likely continuing until the Bar Kokhba Revolt (132–136 CE), and the presence of ossuaries indicates use by a Jewish family. Cave 2, adjacent to Cave 1, comprises a vaulted chamber with a central standing pit surrounded by fifteen kokhim, along with two smaller niches likely used for secondary bone collection. Its ceramic and metal finds largely correspond to the same chronological range, though a small number of earlier sherds suggest the cave was originally hewn two centuries earlier and later reused, paralleling Hellenistic-era tombs near Tel Maresha. No ossuaries were recovered from this cave despite their presence in neighboring caves; the excavators proposed several possible explanations, including regional variation in Jewish burial customs, distinct practices among Jewish families of Idumean descent, or a period of disuse coinciding with the height of ossuary use.

Cave 3, substantially damaged by both ancient quarrying and modern looting, retains a comparable vaulted plan with twenty-three kokhim; a limited probe yielded only a small quantity of pottery consistent with the same period. Cave 4, situated at the base of a disused quarry adjacent to Cave 3, comprises a square chamber with eight completed kokhim and an incised line marking the intended location of a ninth. Finds included several ossuaries along with pottery, lamps, beads, and glass fragments, again dated to the first and second centuries CE. The excavators concluded that the four caves formed part of a larger cemetery used by a Jewish population between the first century BCE and the mid-second century CE, though it remains uncertain whether the cemetery served the settlement at Khirbet Tabaq or Tel Goded itself. Burial activity in the caves, like occupation at Khirbet Tabaq, appears to have ceased with the Bar Kokhba Revolt.

== Recreational trail ==
Tel Goded is one of the most visited sites in the Judean lowlands, and is included along the Israel National Trail. A system of subterranean hiding places, burial niches (kūkhīm), and an ancient well (Bir Rasaq) at the southeastern foot of the archaeological site make it a prominent tourist attraction. The site is criss-crossed by marked hiking trails and many bicycle paths. The site is barred to motor-vehicles, in an attempt to encourage re-vegetation of the natural flora, but may be accessed by foot ascent from the base of the archaeological mound. Access to the site is via road 38 (Beit Shemesh-Beit Guvrin), about 4 kilometers west of Moshav Nahusha

== Gallery ==
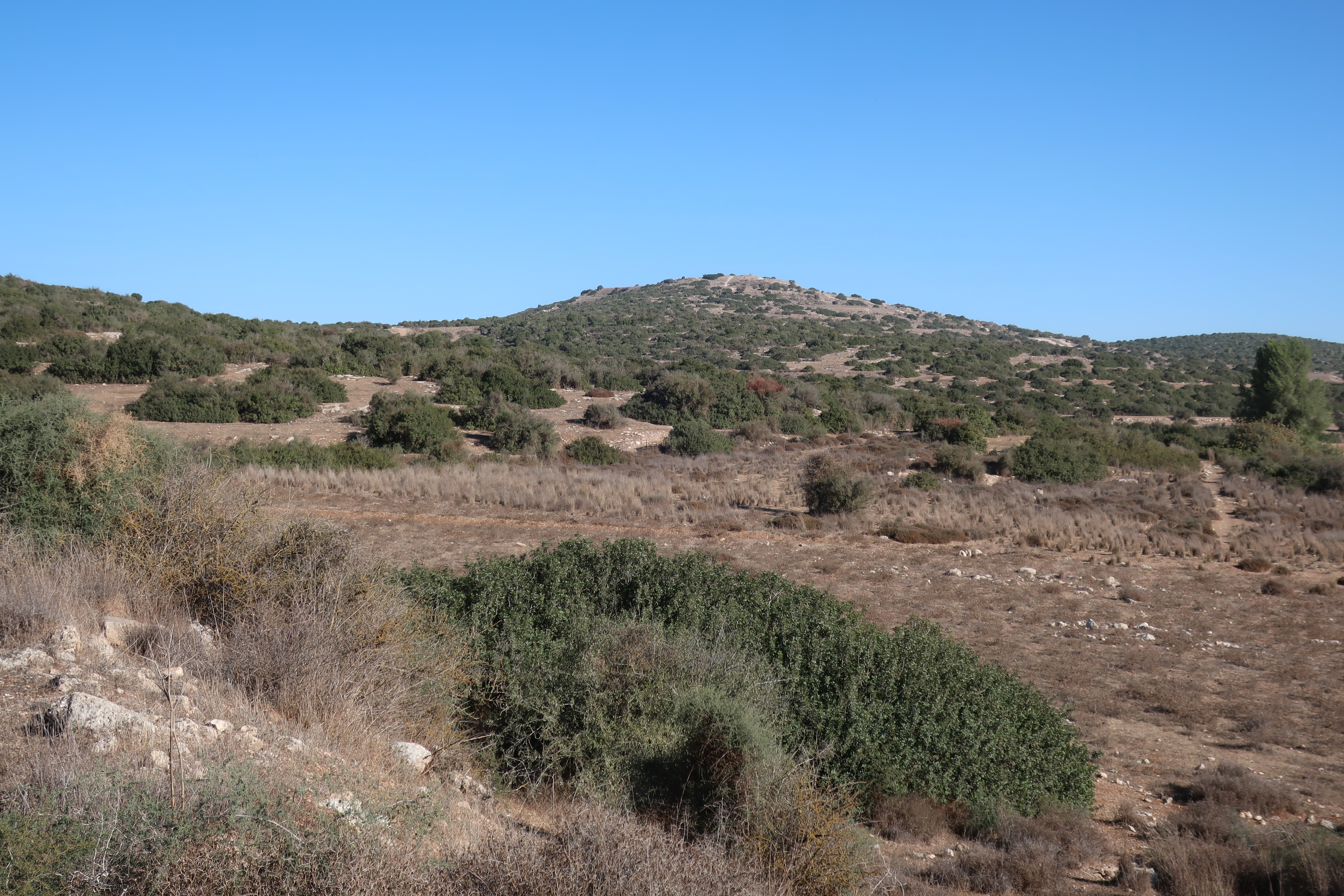
Approach to tell from its south

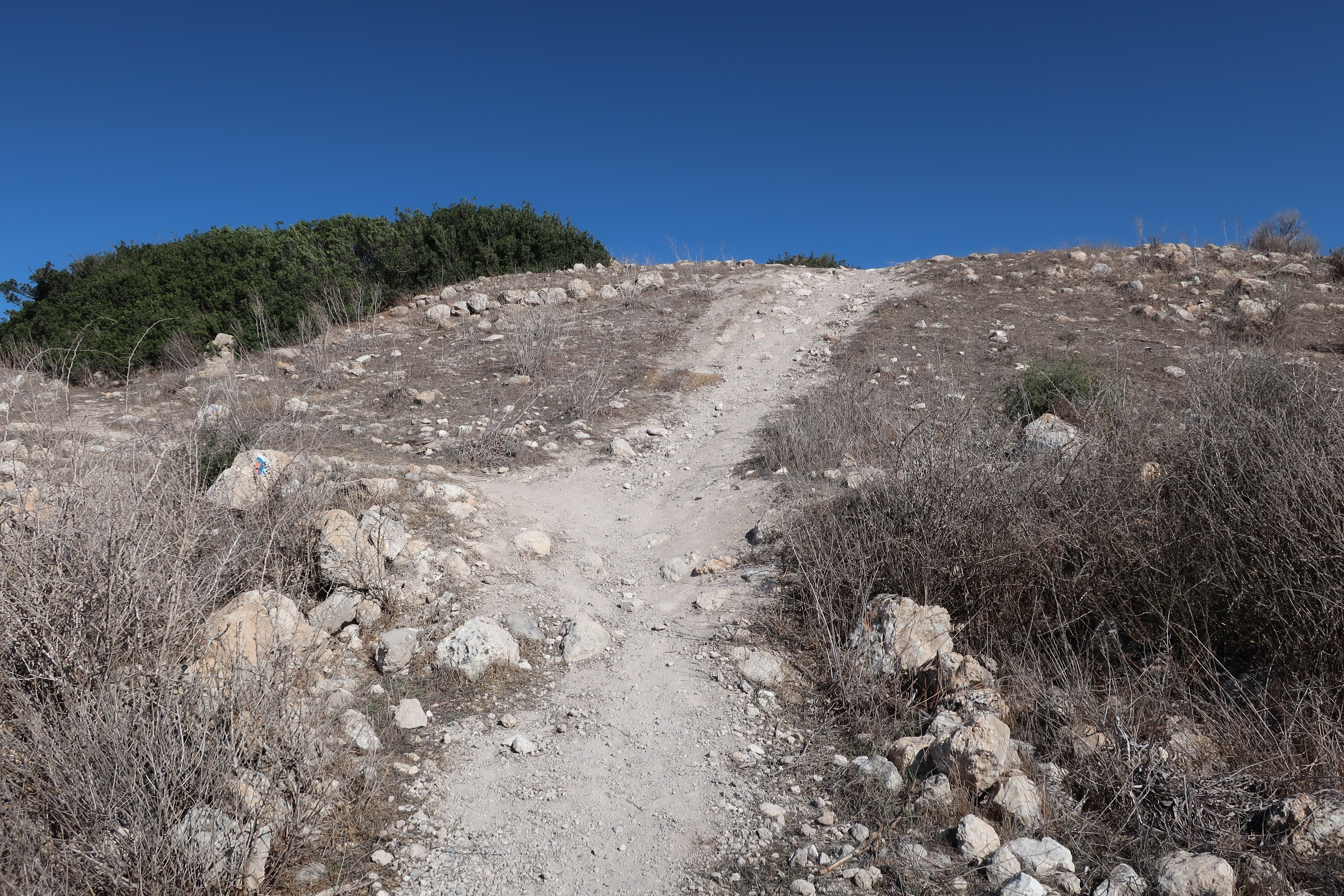
Ascent to ruin from its south

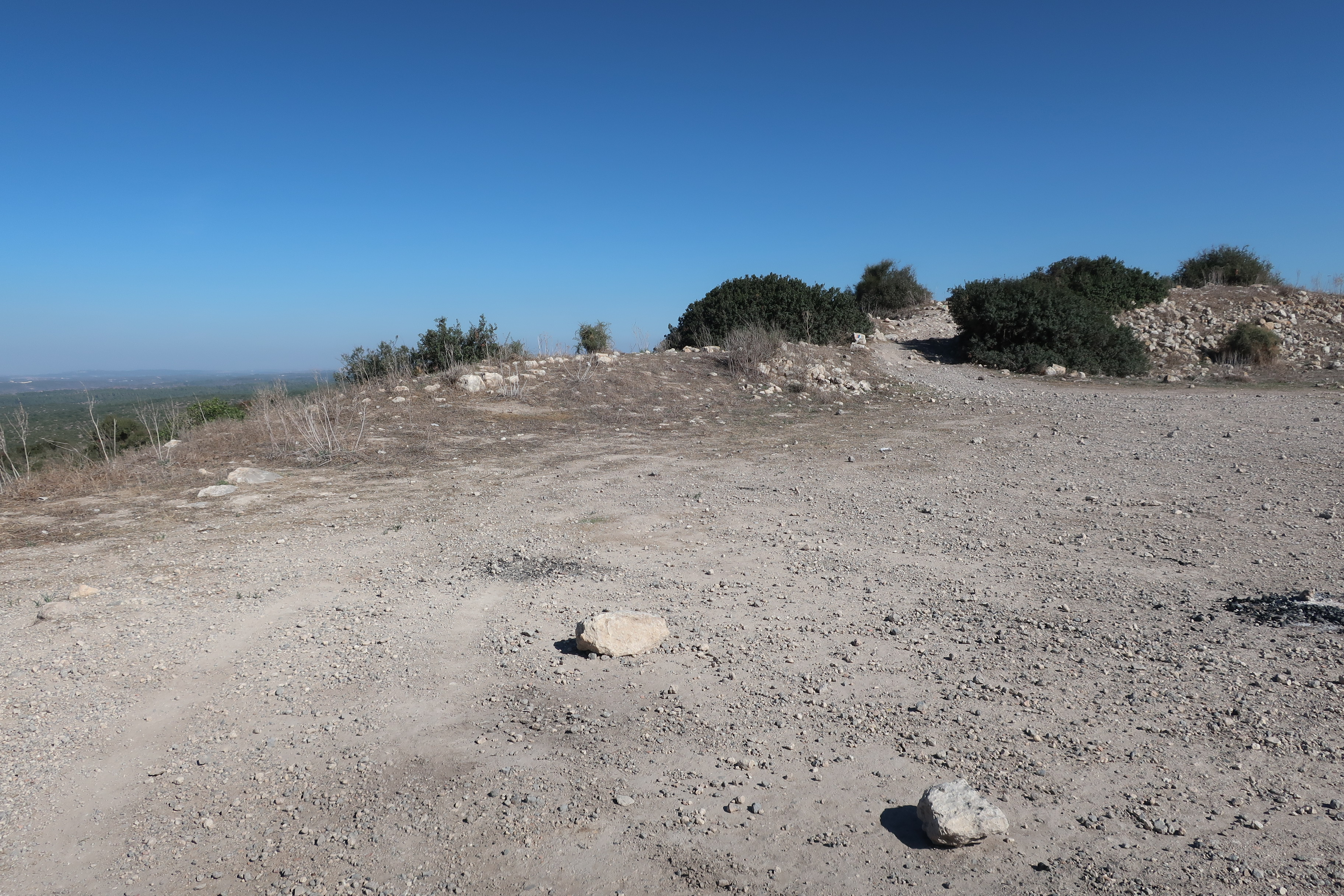
Eminence where once stood the Roman villa

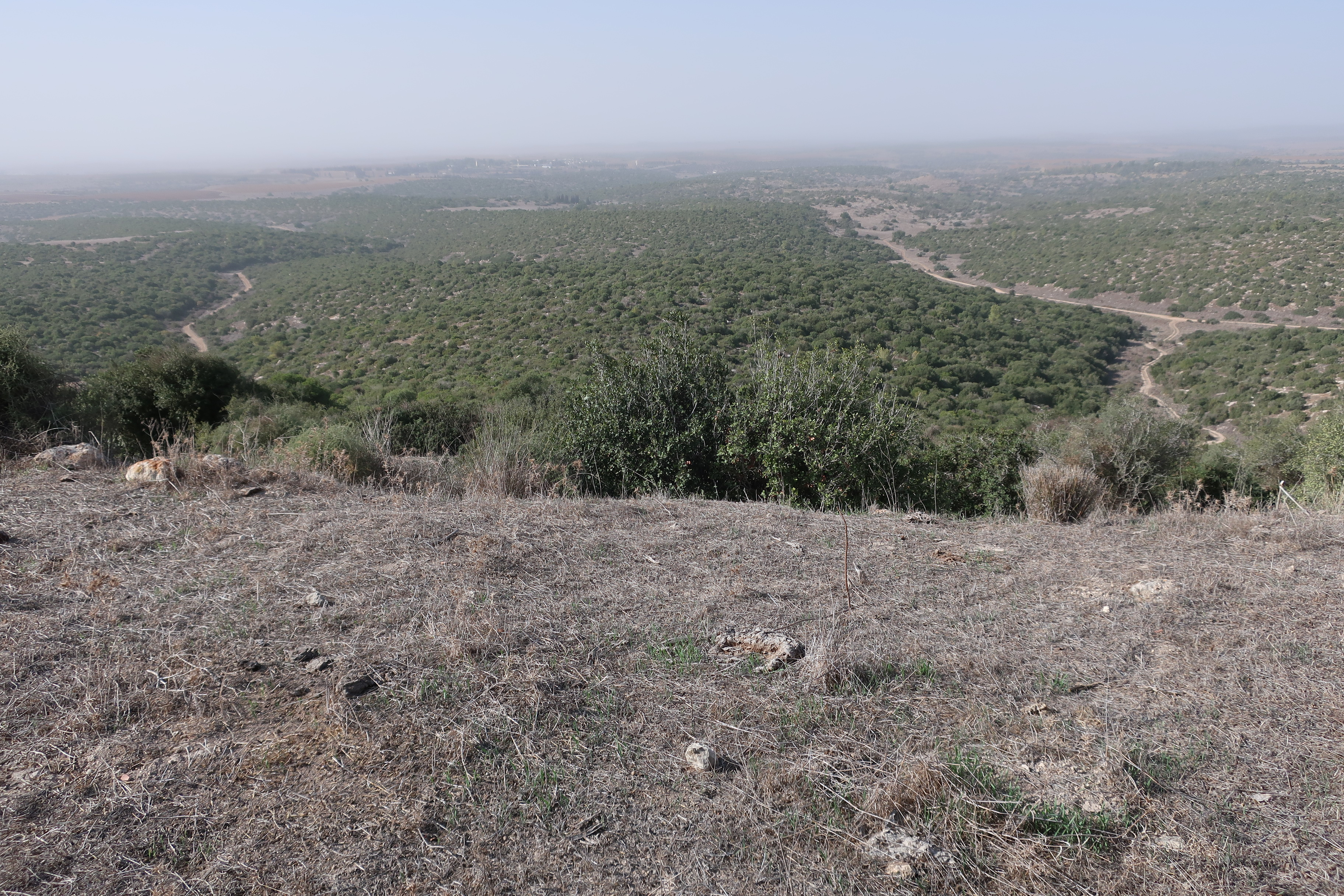
Looking west from the top of the tell

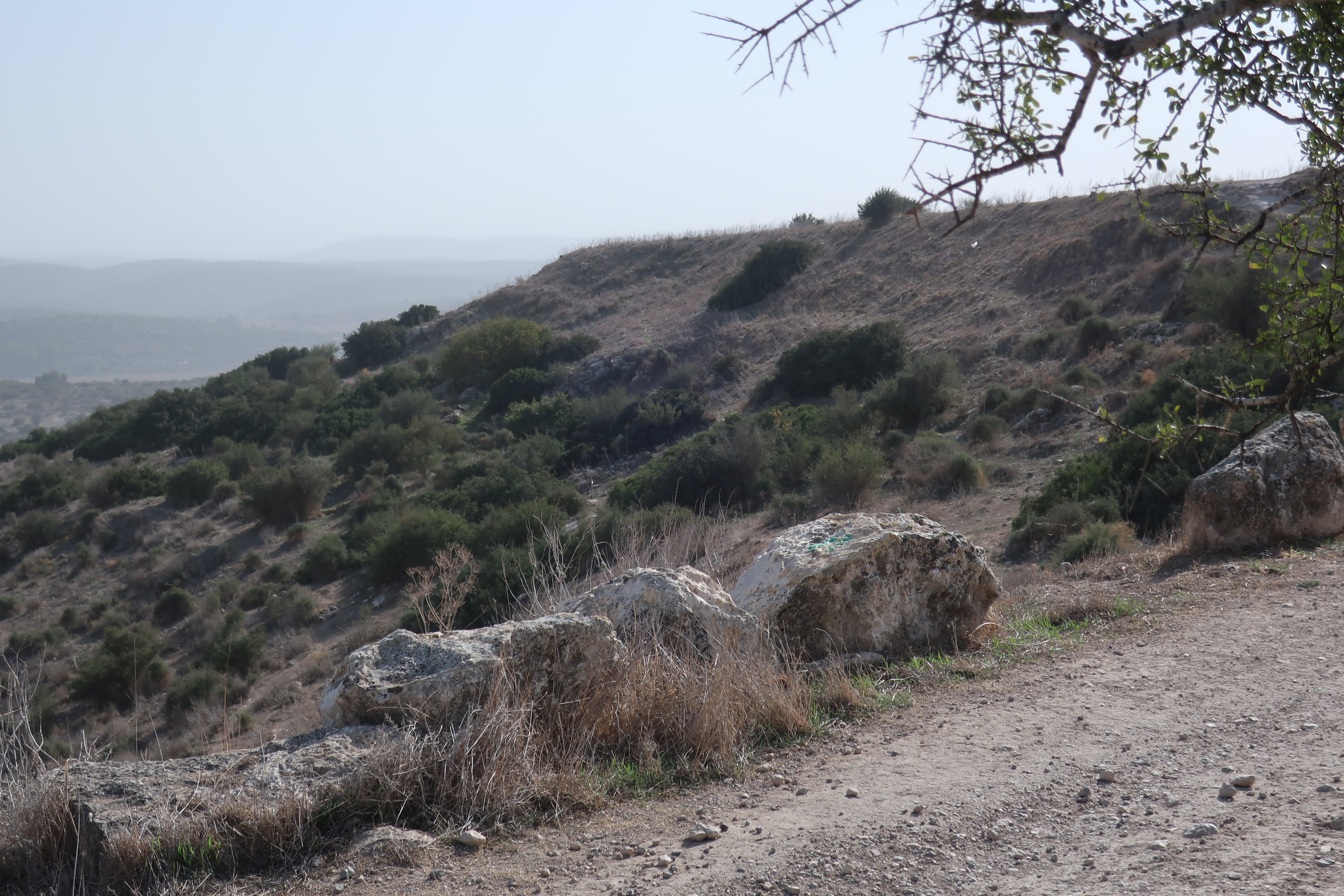
Ruin of Tell ej-Judeideh

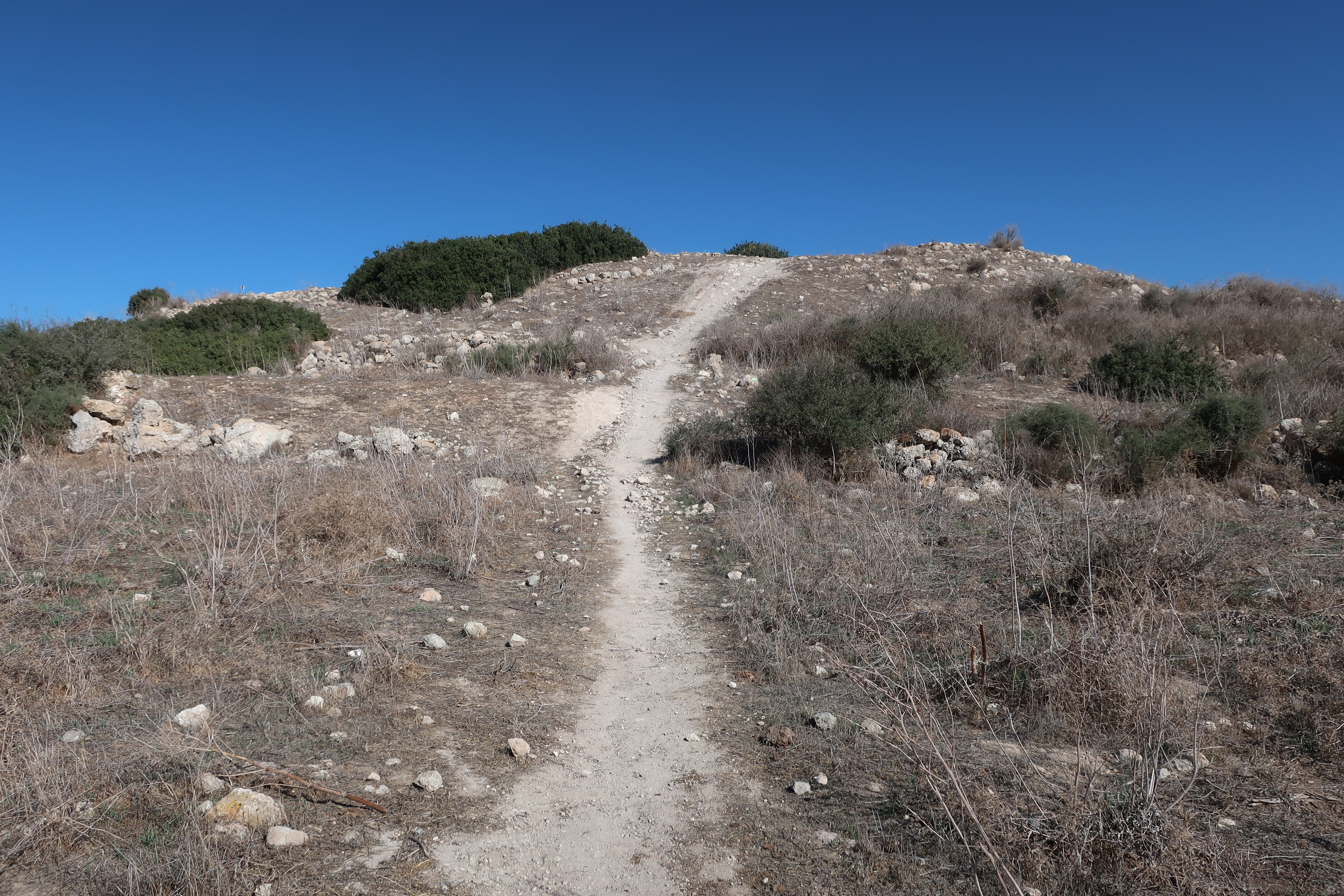
Southern ascent to Tell ej-Judeideh

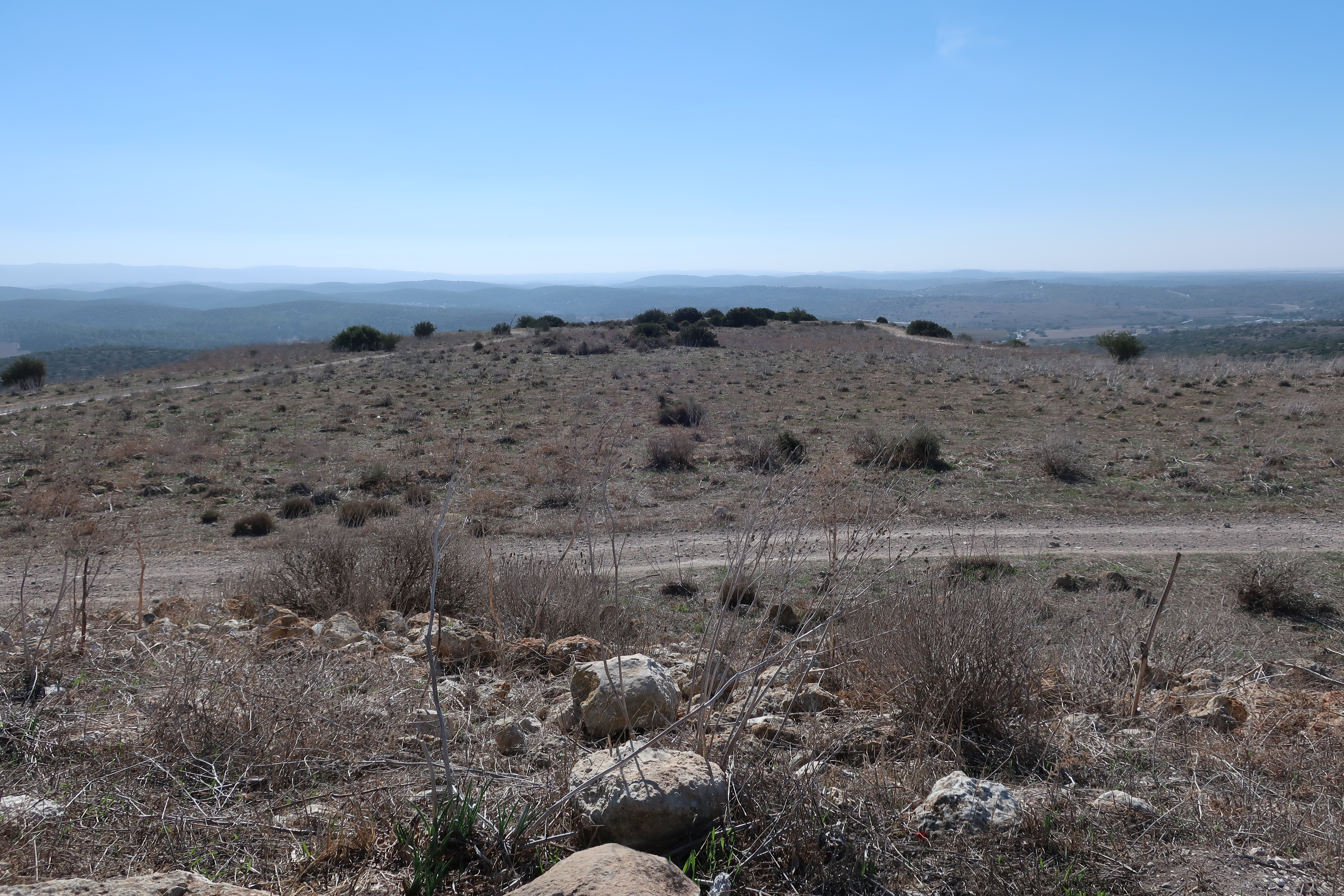
Southern axis of ruin, seen from Roman villa

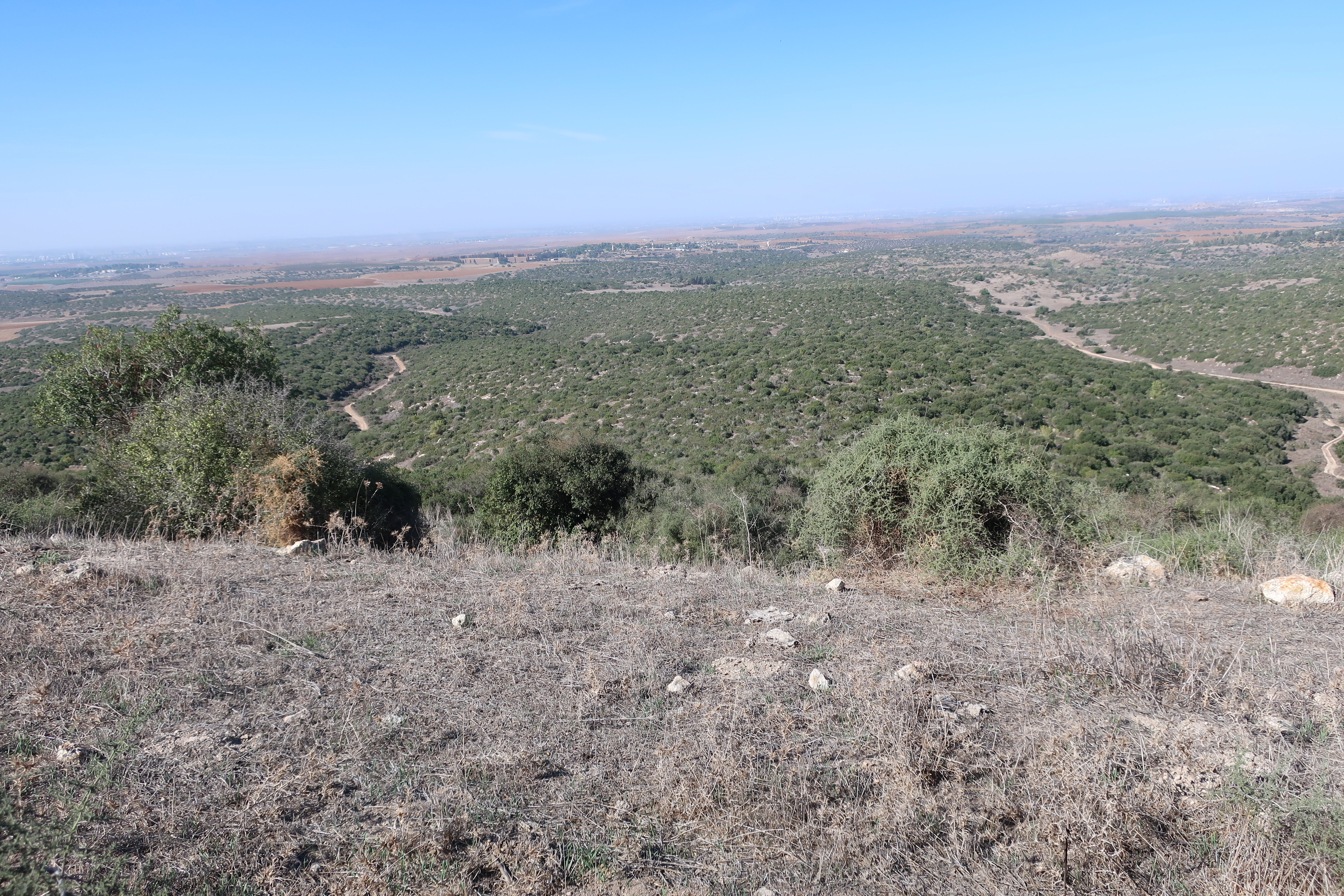
Tell ej-Judeideh, looking west

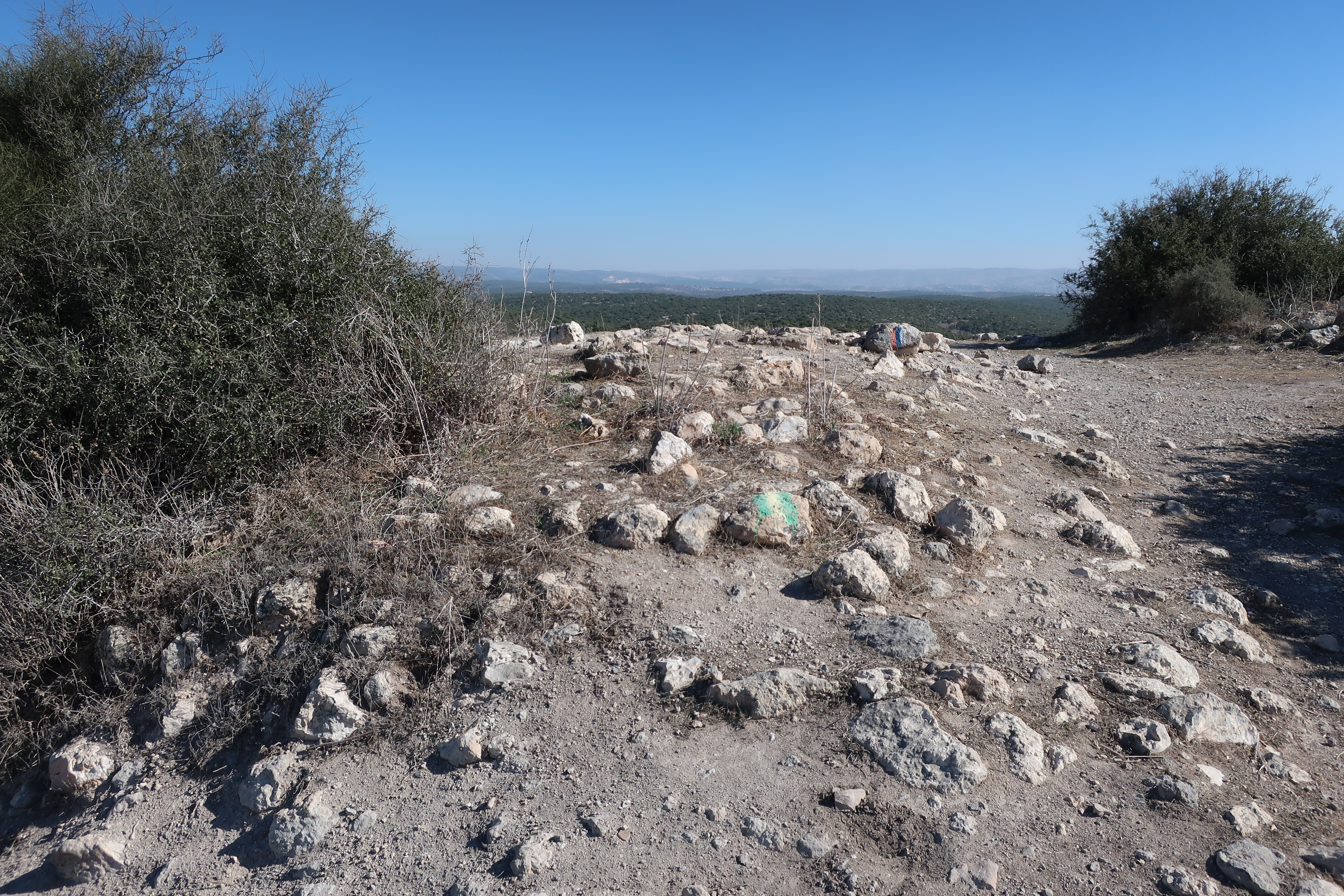
The eminence in the center of the ruin

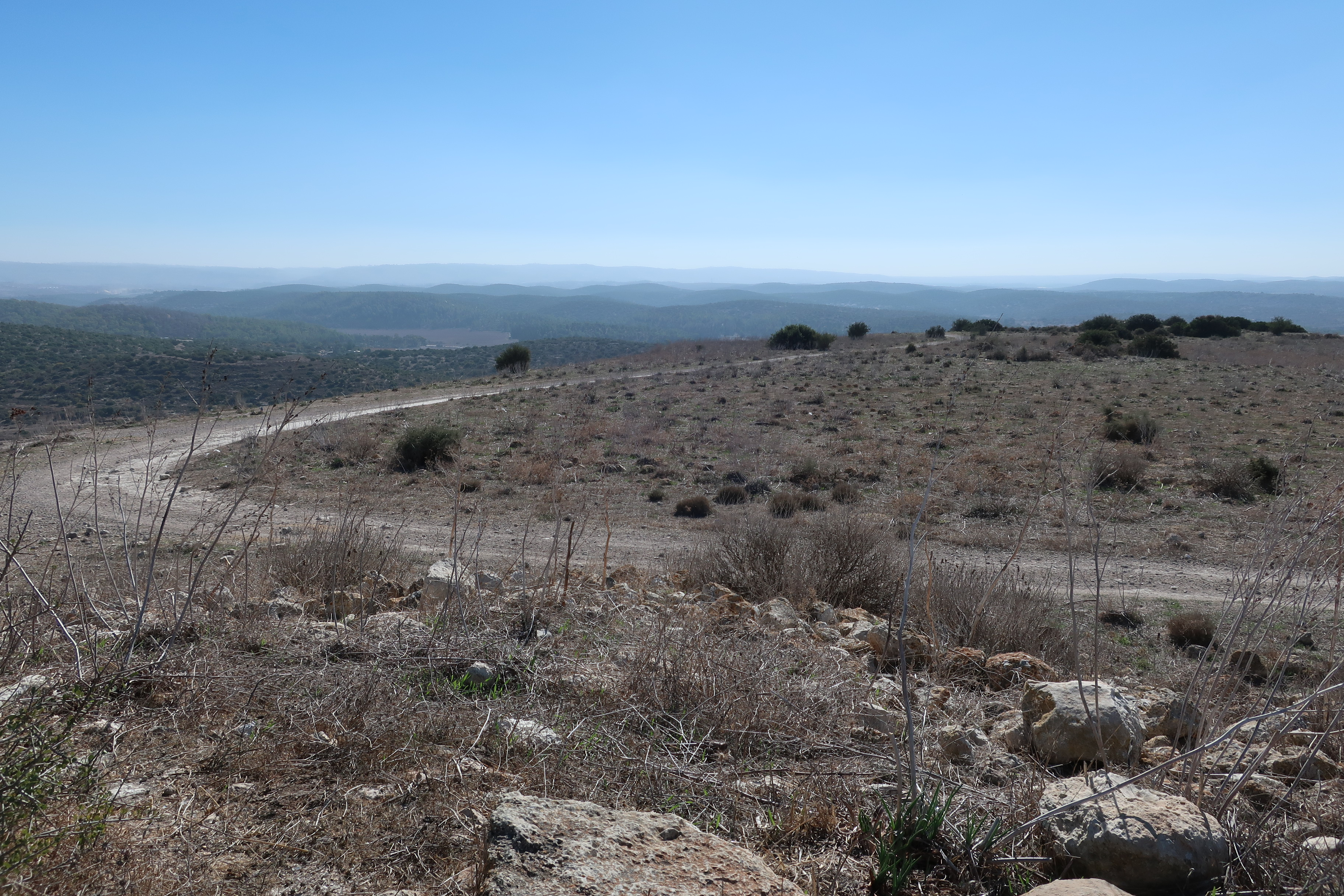
The level top of ruin, looking south

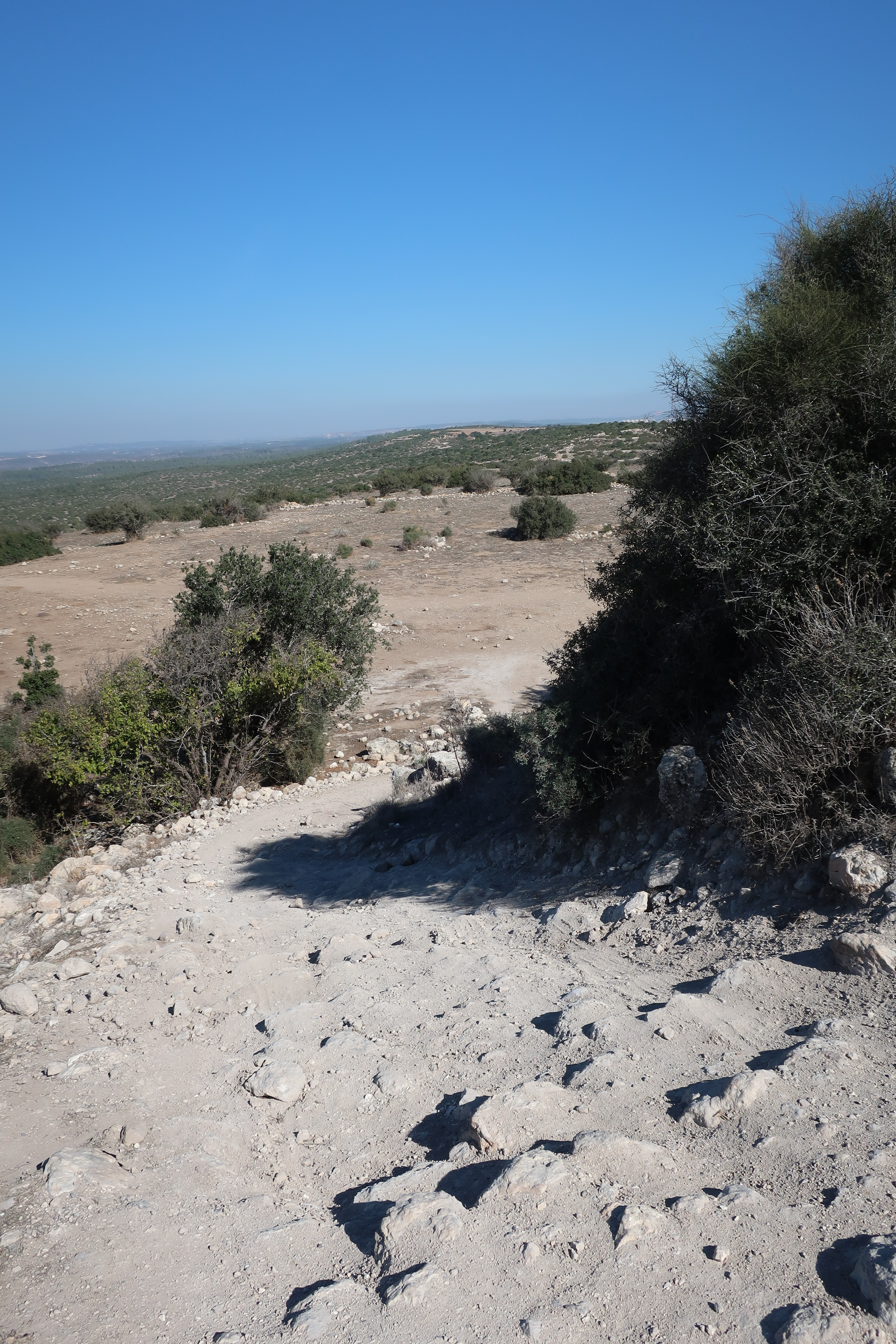
Top of archaeological mound

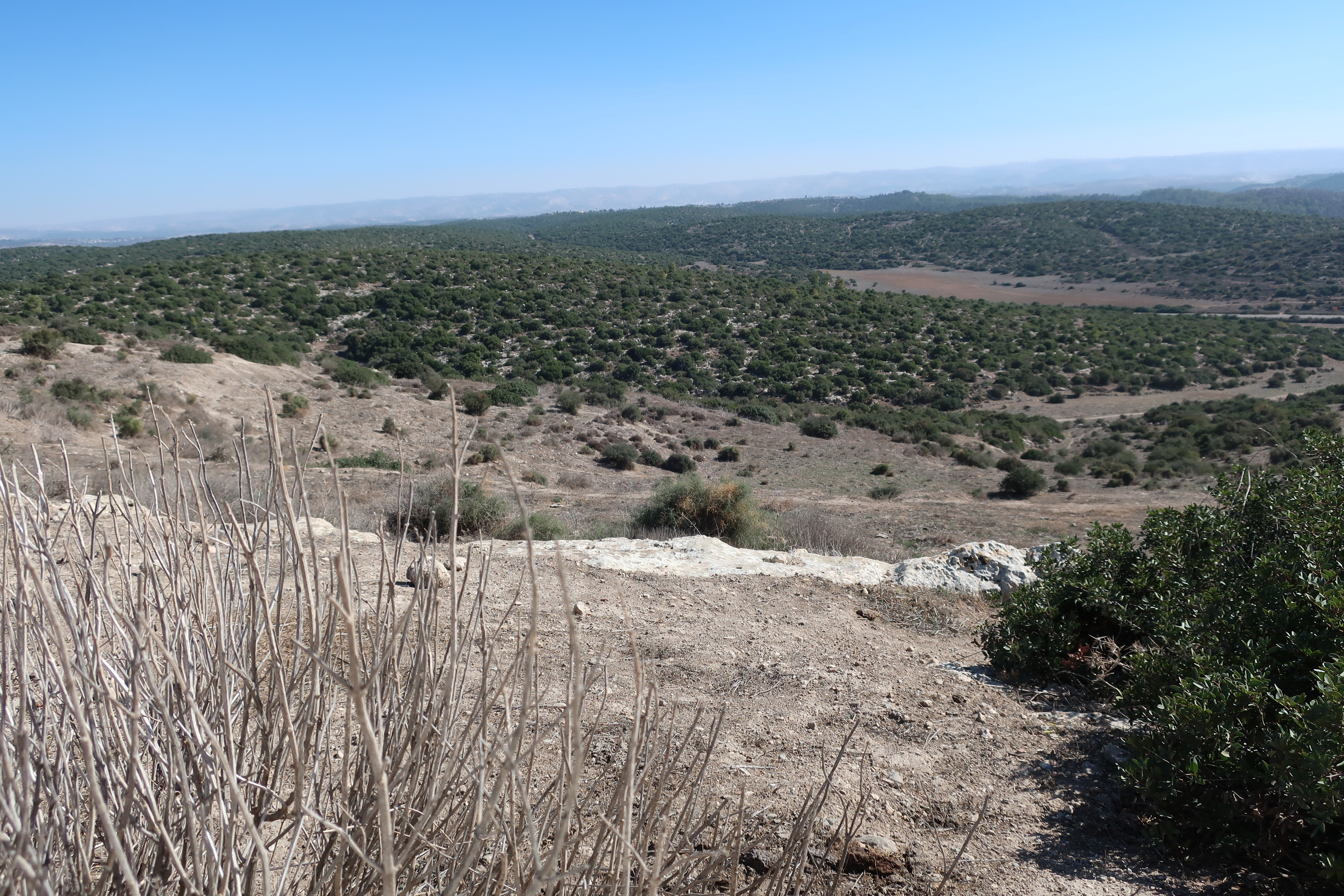
View towards the east, from atop of ruin

== See also ==
- Horvat Midras
- Horvat 'Ethri
- Horvat Burgin
- Khirbet Beit Lei
- Khirbet el-Ein
- Tel Goded
- Tel Lavnin

== Bibliography ==
- Aharoni, Y. (1979). The Land of the Bible: A Historical Geography (2 ed.). Philadelphia: Westminster Press. ISBN 0664242669. OCLC 6250553. (original Hebrew edition: 'Land of Israel in Biblical Times - Historical Geography', Bialik Institute, Jerusalem (1962))
- Ben-Yosef, Sefi, ed. (n.d.). "Tel Goded (Tell Judeideh)". Israel Guide – Judaea (A useful encyclopedia for the knowledge of the country) (in Hebrew). Vol. 9. Jerusalem: Keter Publishing House, in affiliation with the Israel Ministry of Defence. OCLC 745203905.
- Bliss, F.J. (1900). "First Report on the Excavations at Tell ej-Judeideh" (PDF). Palestine Exploration Fund Quarterly Statement. 32 (2). London: Palestine Exploration Fund.
- Bliss, F.J. (1900b). "Second Report on the Excavations at Tell ej-Judeideh". Palestine Exploration Fund Quarterly Statement. 32 (3). London: Palestine Exploration Fund: 199. doi:10.1179/peq.1900.32.3.199. S2CID 161308733.
- Conder, C.R.; Kitchener, H.H. (1883). The Survey of Western Palestine: Memoirs of the Topography, Orography, Hydrography, and Archaeology. Vol. 3. London: Committee of the Palestine Exploration Fund.
- Gibson, Simon (1994). "The Tell ej-Judeideh (Tel Goded) Excavations: A Re-appraisal Based on Archival Records in the Palestine Exploration Fund". Journal of the Institute of Archaeology of Tel Aviv University. 21 (2). Tel Aviv University: 194–234. doi:10.1179/tav.1994.1994.2.194.
- Herrmann, Siegfried (1989). "The So-called 'Fortress System of Rehoboam,' 2 Chron 11:5-12: Theoretical Considerations". Eretz-Israel: Archaeological, Historical and Geographical Studies. 20 (Yigael Yadin Memoril Volume). JSTOR 23621927.
- Palmer, E.H. (1881). The Survey of Western Palestine: Arabic and English Name Lists Collected During the Survey by Lieutenants Conder and Kitchener, R. E. Transliterated and Explained by E.H. Palmer. Committee of the Palestine Exploration Fund.
- Shea, William H. (1985). "Sennacherib's Second Palestinian Campaign". Journal of Biblical Literature. 104 (3): 401–418. doi:10.2307/3260921. JSTOR 3260921.
- Tsafrir, Y.; Leah Di Segni; Judith Green (1994). (TIR): Tabula Imperii Romani. Iudaea, Palestina: Eretz Israel in the Hellenistic, Roman and Byzantine Periods; Maps and Gazetteer. Jerusalem: Israel Academy of Sciences and Humanities. ISBN 965-208-107-8.
- Tsafrir, Y.; Zissu, B. (2002). "A Hiding Complex of the Second Temple Period and the Time of the Bar-Kokhba Revolt at 'Ain-'Arrub in the Hebron Hills". The Roman and Byzantine Near East. Journal of Roman Archaeology Supplementary Series. Vol. 49. pp. 7–35.
- Vargon, Shmuel (1992). "Gedud: A Place-Name in the Shephelah of Judah". Vetus Testamentum. 42 (4): 557–564. doi:10.2307/1518965. JSTOR 1518965.

=== External links ===
- Survey of Western Palestine, Map 20: IAA, Wikimedia commons
- "Tel Goded, Tel el-Judeideh". The Levantine Ceramics Project.
