= Tel Burna =

Israeli archaeological site

- תל בורנה (Hebrew)
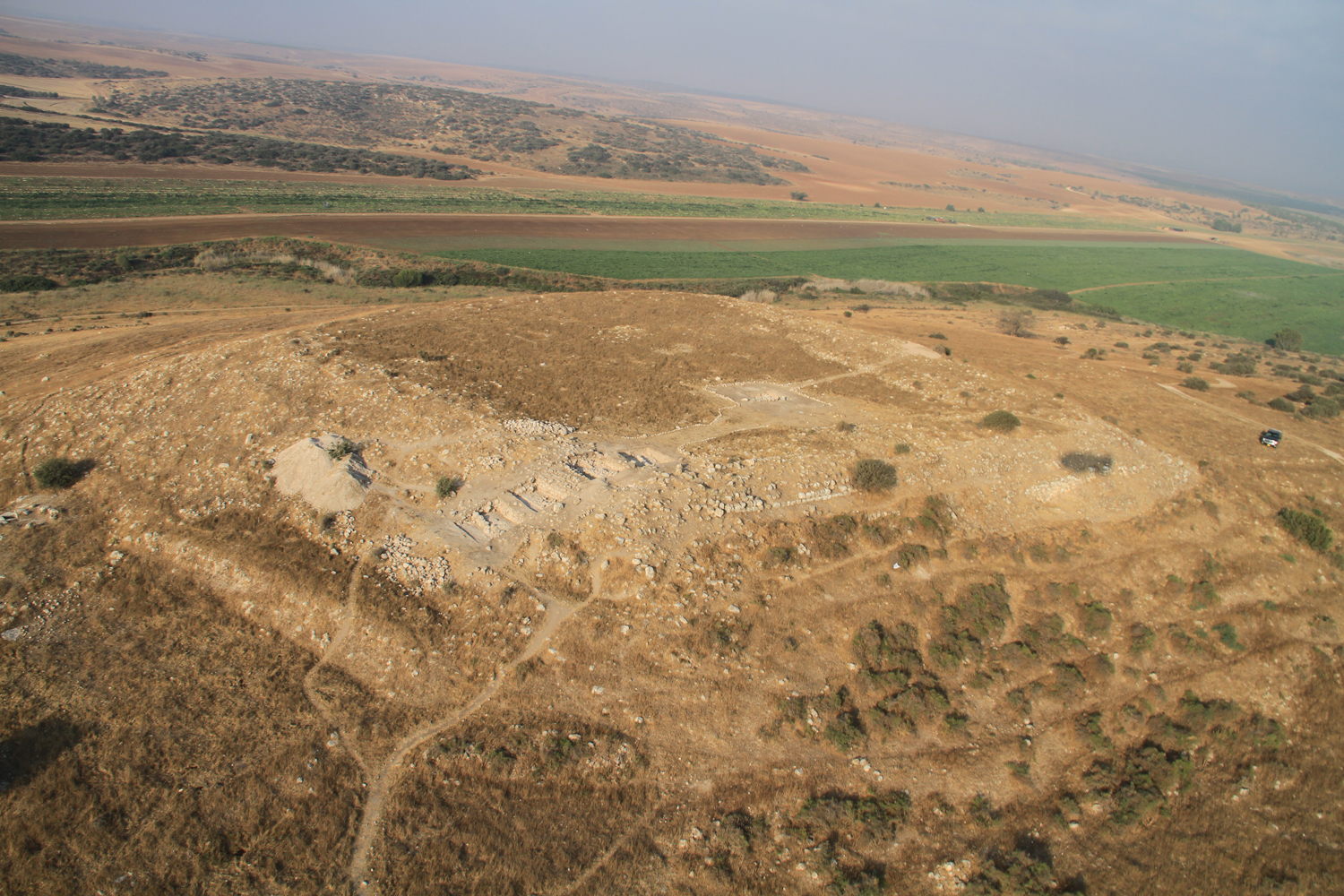
- Aerial view of Tel Burna

- Location within Israel
- 31.633944°N 34.867858°E
- Periods: Bronze & Iron Ages
- Location: Israel
- Region: Shfela
- Grid position: 138115 PAL

Site notes
- Excavation dates: 2010-2024
- Archaeologists: Itzhaq Shai, Joe Uziel

Tel Burna (also Tell Bornât) is an archaeological site located in the Shephelah (Judean foothills), along the banks of Nahal Guvrin, not far from modern-day Qiryat Gat. Tel Burna is located near Beit Guvrin/Maresha, Tel Goded, Lachish, Tell es-Safi/Gath and Tel Zayit (4 kilometers to the west). The site is thought to have been one of a series of sites along the border between Judah and Philistia.

== Identification ==
Due to its location, and its prominence in the Iron Ages, W. Albright and Y. Aharoni, among others, have suggested identifying the site with Libnah, a site mentioned several times in the Bible, and noted to be one of the 13 Kohanic cities. Libnah had also revolted against the Kingdom of Judah in the 9th century BCE (2 Kings 8:22) and where Hamutal, Queen of Judah in the 7th century BCE was born (2 Kings 23:31).

Eusebius (3rd–4th century CE) in his Onomasticon mentions the ancient biblical city of Gath (Joshua 11:22), saying that it was a village formerly inhabited by the Anakim and that the village was still inhabited in his day and situated "not far from Eleutheropolis (Beit Gubrin) near Diospolis (Lod), near the fifth milestone from Eleutheropolis." Eusebius' description, who places the village at the 5th-milestone from Beit Gubrin, puts Tel Burna in approximate position as a contender for the site of ancient Gath, or else Tell ej-Judeideh, as both ruins are principal Bronze Age sites only 2 miles (3.2 km) apart, and situated in the direction of Lod as one sets out from Beit Gubrin. Nearby Maresha is placed by Eusebius at about 2 milestones from Eleutheropolis (2 kilometres (1.2 mi) southeast of Beit Gubrin.

If in fact the location of Libnah should be sought out at Tel Burna, the excavations thus far do conform to what is understood about the city from the Biblical texts. Moreover, some recent work in 2013 has led the leader of the excavation, Itzhaq Shai, program director of the Tel Burna Excavation Project, to believe that Tel Burna is the site of the biblical town of Libnah.

== History ==
The site was established in the Early Bronze II period and extensively settled in the Middle Bronze, Late Bronze, and Iron Ages (with peak activity in the Early Bronze Age and Iron II periods). It was lightly occupied in the Persian and Byzantine periods.

During the Late Bronze IIB (13th century BC) occupation began, on virgin soil, on a 40 meter by 100 meter platform below and to the west of the summit. The site reached its maximum occupation are during this period. Large quantities of LBA pottery shards, a 500 square meter cultic structure with a large courtyard containing a standing stone, Cypriot zoomorphic vessels, Mycenaean figurines, a Cypriot three-cupped votive vessel, and a steatite Mittani cylinder seal were found. Analysis of pottery and sediments in the courtyard indicated it had been used for feasting activities. Embedded in the courtyard were two large Cypriot pithoi alongside locally produced pithoi.

After a period of modest use in Iron Age (IIA) occupation expanded in the IIAB-C period (c. 9th to 7th century BC) though restricted only to the summit of the mound which was protected by a casemate fortification wall. The fortification consisted of two parallel walls (2 meters apart) with perpendicular connectors. The other was 2 meters wide and the inner wall 1.5 meters wide, both constructed of large field stones. The fortification encloses a 70 by 70 meter area and has a length of about 270 meters. Along the southern section of the wall a monumental city gate with a massive stone tower and buttresses was excavated. Finds included a large number of pottery shards, some with LMLK seal impressions.

In 1948 the site was used as a military outpost in the war.

== Archaeology ==
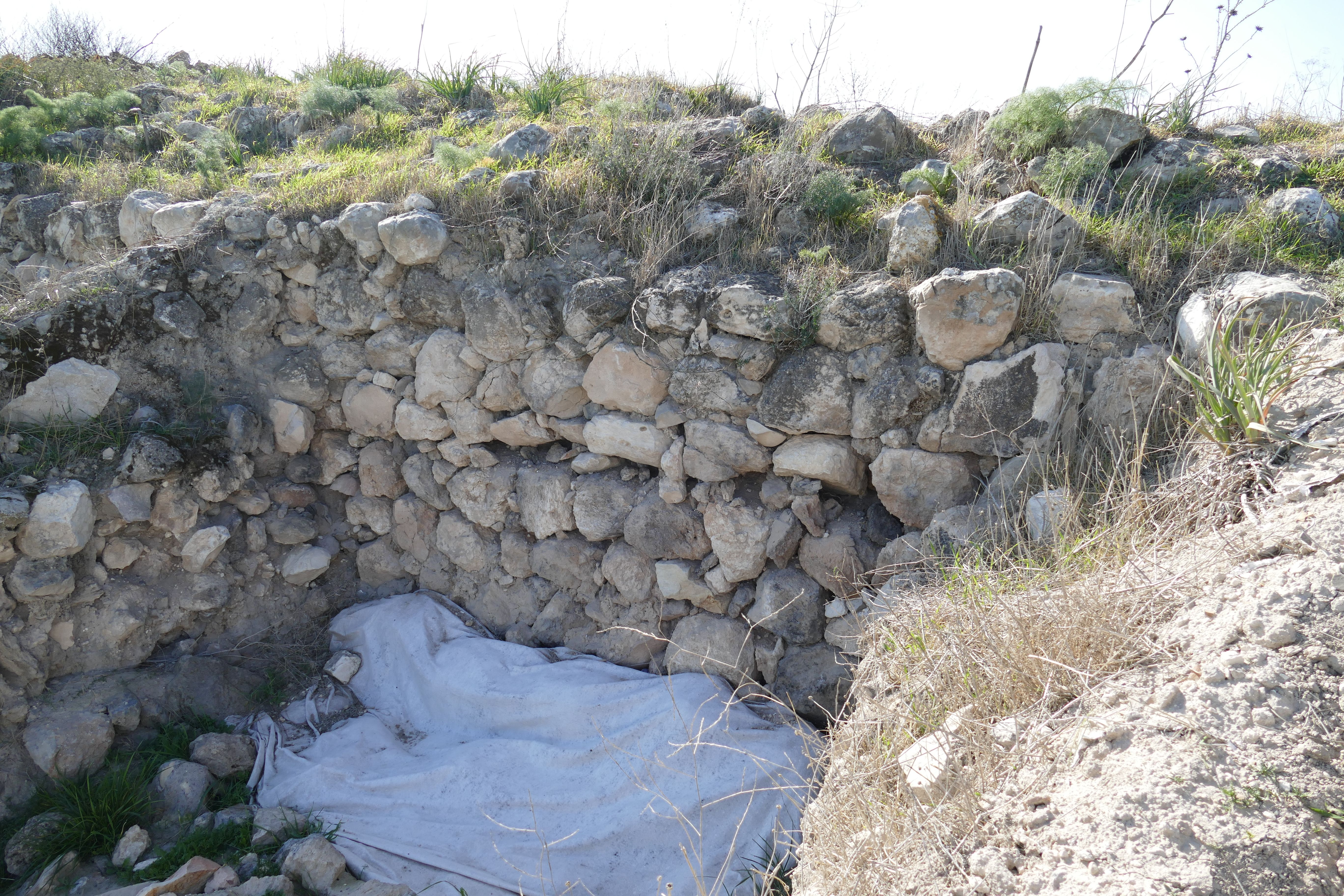
Tel Burna excavation

The site consists of a roughly 70 meter by 70 meter central mound and about a 16 hectare lower town. The site was described by Victor Guérin in 1869 (as Tell Bournat) and then a decade later by Lieutenant Claude Conder of the Palestine Exploration Fund (noting 4 foot high fortification walls). A limited survey of the site occurred in the 1950s.

A site survey was conducted in 2009. The first excavations at the site were conducted in the summer of 2010, by a team from the Institute of Archaeology at Ariel University, as part of a long term archaeological project, headed by Itzhaq Shai and Joe Uziel, affiliated with Bar Ilan University which continues to the present. Among the Iron Age II finds on the summit were six storage silos which went out of use after that time. One silo cuts the inner fortification wall, indicating that the wall had fall out of use by that date. Among the late Iron Age II finds in the backfill of one silo was a jar handle fragment stamped with a private seal "'zr followed by hgy" which the excavators took as two names.

Finds included an illustrated krater, unique but parallel to the Lachish ewer.

== See also ==
- Cities of the ancient Near East
