= Libnah =

Coordinates: 31°37.8′N 34°52.4′E

Libnah or Lobana (Hebrew: לִבְנָה, whiteness; Latin: Lobana) was an independent city, probably near the western seaboard of Israel, with its own king at the time of the Israelite conquest of Canaan. It is thought to have been an important producer of revenue, and one that rebelled against the Judahite crown.

== Records in the Hebrew Bible ==
The Old Testament book of Joshua relates that the Israelites attacked and conquered Libnah, executing its king and leaving no other survivors. It is assigned to the tribe of Judah as one of the 13 Kohanic cities during the Israelite settlement (Joshua 21:13). The town revolted during the reign of King Jehoram of Judah, according to 2 Kings 8:22 and 2 Chronicles 21:10, because Jehoram "had abandoned [the] God of his fathers". The revolt took place at the same time as Edom revolted against Judean rule (2 Kings 8:20–22).

Josiah, King of Judah, married Hamutal, daughter of Jeremiah of Libnah (1 Chronicles 3:15; 2 Kings 23:31–32; 2 Kings 24:17–18; Jeremiah 22:11). Two of their sons, Jehoahaz and Zedekiah also became Kings of Judah.

Sennacherib's army may have attacked Libnah in 701 BCE, but the various biblical reports are, recent scholarship has argued, somewhat confused, having Libnah attacked after Hezekiah had already surrendered at Lachish. Since Sennacherib attacked from the north, it is odd that he would move back to conquer a town in the north after a victory in the south. It is possible that the editor reversed the historical chronology. Kenneth Kitchen, for one, found no difficulty in the traditional account, which has Libnah attacked after Lachish. According to the narrative at (2 Chronicles 32:20–21a, an angel of Yahweh destroyed the host of Sennacherib's army, and at 2 Kings 19:35, the number of Assyrian soldiers killed is claimed to have amounted to 185,000. The large number of troops reportedly dying overnight is explained as possibly due to poisoning, and the Targum version refers to pestilence.

Eusebius and Jerome (OS 274:13; 135:28) describe it as being a village in the region of Eleutheropolis (Beit Gubrin), called in their day Lobana or Lobna.

== As a station of the Exodus ==
Libnah is also the name of the 17th station among the places the Israelites are said to have stopped over at during the Exodus. The context suggests that this Libna lay somewhere in the Sinai Desert which the Israelites are described as traversing prior to entering the land of Canaan.

== Possible sites and excavations ==
- Tel Lavnin (Khurbet Tell el Beida) in the Judean Shephelah.
- The excavators of Tell Zeitah have suggested it as a possible location of Libnah.
- An excavation has been initiated at Tel Burna, which has also been identified as the possible site of Libnah, based on William F. Albright's proposal. Tel Burna was fortified and lay between the Philistine city of Gath and the Judahite city of Lachish, and it was inhabited continuously from the Bronze Age onwards. Until the Judahite period, it appears to have been a pagan cultic centre.
- Vargon held the view that Tell ej-Judeideh was to be identified with Libnah.
