= 13 Kohanic cities =

Settlements named in the Bible

The 13 Kohanic Cities are the 13 cities/villages and their respective peripheral territory listed in the Book of Joshua (Joshua 21:13–21) as having been allocated by Elazar and Joshua to the kohanim (Israelite priesthood) and their families. The Kohanic cities are a sub-set of the 48 Levitical cities allocated to sections of the Tribe of Levi. As described in the Torah, since the tribe of Levi did not receive a contiguous territorial inheritance like the other tribes, Israel was commanded to give them "cities to dwell in and their surrounding pastures" from the inheritance of the other tribes.

== Biblical references ==
The Levitical cities (Hebrew: ʿarei ha-Levi’im) were 48 cities in ancient Israel assigned to the tribe of Levi, including 13 cities for the Aaronic priesthood. Because the Levites did not receive a standard territorial inheritance, the Torah commands that the Israelites give them designated cities "to dwell in", together with surrounding pasturelands (migrashim).

The Kohanic cities all come along with the detail ואת מגרשה ("the peripheral land around the city") - presumably, this amount is 2000 amah in all directions. These 13 cities are the primary land allotments for kohanim in the Land of Israel and were in use from the initial entry of the children of Israel into the land of Israel up until they were depopulated by Nebuchadnezzar.

According to the Books of Ezra and Nehemiah, these 13 cities were re-inhabited by the kohanim upon their return from the 70-year term of the Babylonian exile.

=== Land lists ===
The areas listed:

1. אֶת חֶבְרוֹן וְאֶת מִגְרָשֶׁהָ Hebron and its periphery
2. וְאֶת לִבְנָה וְאֶת מִגְרָשֶׁהָ Livna and its periphery
3. וְאֶת יַתִּר וְאֶת מִגְרָשֶׁהָ Yatir and its periphery
4. וְאֶת אֶשְׁתְּמֹעַ וְאֶת מִגְרָשֶׁהָ Eshtemoa and its periphery
5. וְאֶת חֹלֹן וְאֶת מִגְרָשֶׁהָ Holon and its periphery
6. וְאֶת דְּבִר וְאֶת מִגְרָשֶׁהָ Devir and its periphery
7. וְאֶת עַיִן וְאֶת מִגְרָשֶׁהָ Ayin and its periphery
8. וְאֶת יֻטָּה וְאֶת מִגְרָשֶׁהָ Yutah and its periphery
9. אֶת בֵּית שֶׁמֶשׁ וְאֶת מִגְרָשֶׁהָ Bet Shemesh and its periphery
10. אֶת גִּבְעוֹן וְאֶת מִגְרָשֶׁהָ Giv’on and its periphery
11. אֶת גֶּבַע וְאֶת מִגְרָשֶׁהָ Geva and its periphery
12. אֶת עֲנָתוֹת וְאֶת מִגְרָשֶׁהָ Anatot and its periphery
13. וְאֶת עַלְמוֹן וְאֶת מִגְרָשֶׁהָ Almon and its periphery
