= Lavnin =

Site in Israel

- Khurbet Tell el-Beida
- Libnah
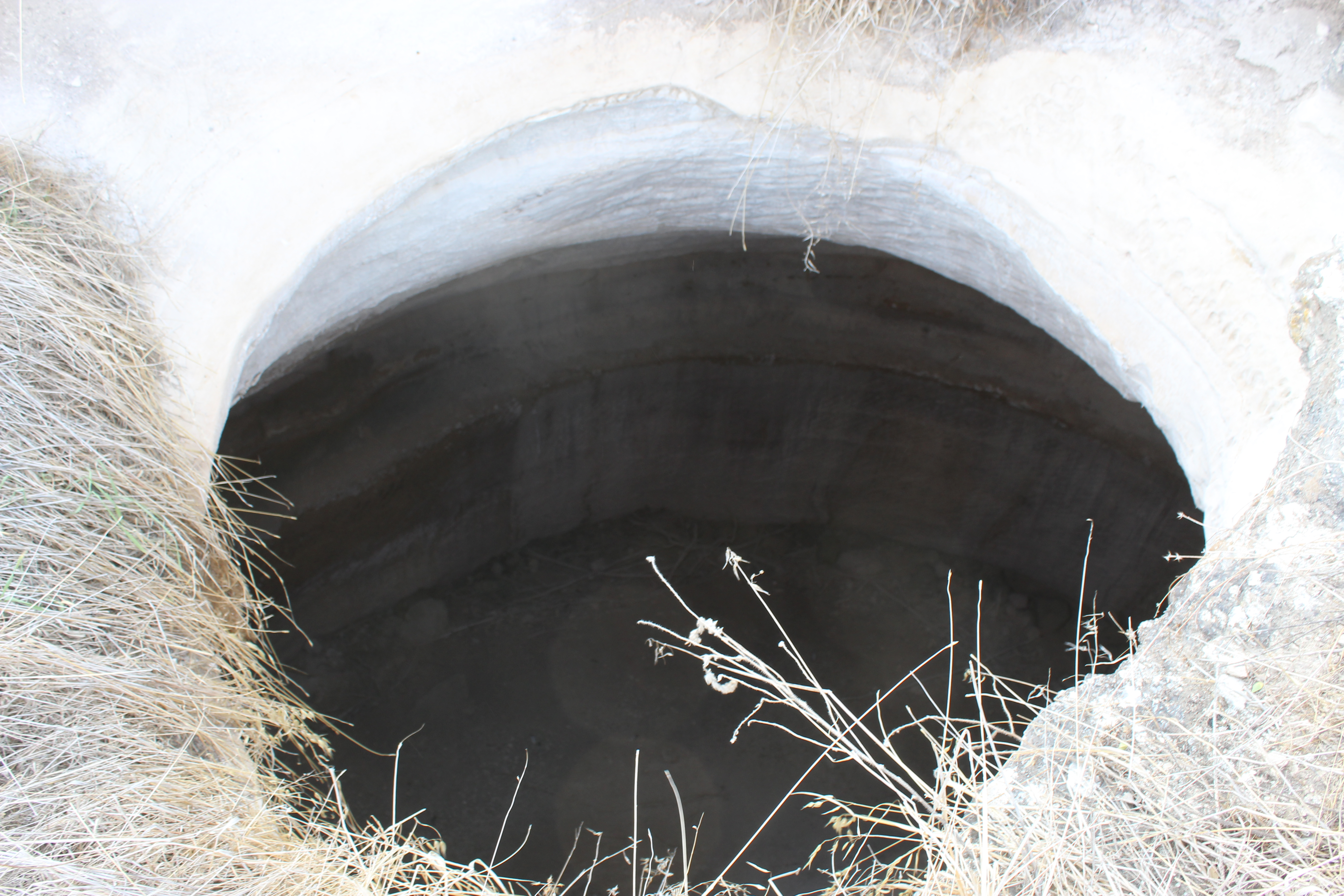
- Den carved in white stone at Lavnin ruin

- Location within Israel
- 31°38′25″N 34°57′03″E
- Periods: Late Bronze, Hellenistic, Roman, Byzantine
- Cultures: Canaanite, Jewish, Greco-Roman
- Region: Judaean Mountains
- Grid position: 145116 PAL

History
- Built: Canaanite period
- Abandoned: unknown

Site notes
- Excavation dates: 2001
- Condition: Ruin

Lavnin (Tel Lavnin; Hebrew: תל לבנין; Hurvat Libnah), also Kh. Tell el-Beida (Arabic: خربة تل البيضة) is an archaeological site located in the central Judaean Lowlands, in modern-day Israel.

Surveys at Lavnin uncovered remains including potsherds, architectural elements, rock-cut tombs, and hiding complexes, indicating that the site was inhabited during the Iron Age, the Second Temple period, and the Byzantine period.

== Location ==
Lavnin is located in the central Judaean Lowlands, on the western bank of Nahal Hakhlil. The site is situated on a hill rising some 389 metres (1,276 ft) above sea level. It lies 8 kilometres (5.0 mi) northwest of Beit Gubrin, and about 1 kilometer west-north-west of Khirbat Umm Burj, directly south of Nehusha.

== Etymology and identification ==
The name Lavnin is a reflection of popular etymology, the modern Hebrew name being a translation of the Arabic word Beida, meaning "white." Others say that its modern name represents "the hill of bricks," hence: Tell Livnin (livanim), based on a different pronunciation of the Hebrew that is typically written without vowels. Archaeologists are divided as to the site's original name, some holding the view that it may have been the biblical Libnah (Joshua 15:42; 21:13) based on its Arabic name, while others thought it to have been the Chezib of Judah, or the Azekah (Joshua 10:10–11) mentioned by Epiphanius.

Depending on whether the site was the same as Lobana, as described by Eusebius in his Onomasticon as "now being a village in Eleutheropolitana" (in the vicinity of Beit Gubrin), the town would have still been settled and occupied as late as the 4th-century CE. Archaeologist Boaz Zissu rejects the notion that the site could have been Chezib of Judah, saying that "since Khirbet Tell el-Bēḍā / Tel Lavnīn was clearly occupied during the Byzantine Period, it is questionable whether this site is the same as Eusebius’ ruined Chasbi." Others proposed that Libnah may be the ruin known as Tell eṣ-Ṣāfi, a view now largely rejected. Travellers C.W.M. van de Velde and H.B. Tristram both placed the ancient ruin of Libnah at the ruin called ʻIrâq el-Menshiyeh, where Kiryat Gat now stands; this view is also now largely rejected.

Lt. Col. Conder of the Palestine Exploration Fund professed to be uncertain about the site of the biblical Libnah, and was equally unfamiliar with the connection between the Arabic name el-Beida and Libnah (= "white"), although acknowledging that "it (Libnah) indicates the 'white' chalk of the Southern Shephelah, and it was taken by Joshua (Joshua 10:30) after Makkedah and before Lachish and Hebron."

== Flora and fauna ==
The Mediterranean plants endemic to the area are the Palestine oak (Quercus calliprinos), terebinth (Pistacia atlantica), lentisk (Pistacia lentiscus), buckthorn (Rhamnus lycioides), and strawberry tree (Arbutus andrachne). Some of these trees have protected status. The area abounds also in fowl such as the partridge (Alectoris chukar), the honey-sucker, the bulbul (Pycnonotus xanthopygos), the black-headed bunting, and the titmouse. The species of agamid lizard, Laudakia stellio, and hares (Lepus) are also common to this region. More rarely, the mongoose (Herpestes ichneumon) and the honey-badger (Mellivora capensis) may be seen.

== Archaeology ==
Surveys at Lavnin uncovered remains including potsherds, architectural elements, rock-cut tombs, and hiding complexes, indicating that the site was inhabited during the Iron Age, the Second Temple period, and the Byzantine period. The site is similar to many of those in the region, having a network of underground hiding complexes, thought to date back to the Bar Kokhba revolt.

A burial cave was discovered on the western slope of the tell. The complex includes a courtyard, an entrance chamber, a main burial chamber, and an additional inner chamber. The original courtyard was almost entirely removed during a later period, when a large bell-shaped quarry was hewn into the area; the cave was looted in antiquity. Above one of the entrances, two inscriptions were found: one, written in crude mirror-script Greek, reads theos (God), while the other, more carefully incised, consists of the Hebrew letters יה. The burial chamber contains eight kokhim (burial niches). Based on its architectural style and layout, Boaz Zissu dated the cave to the first century CE.

Two additional looted burial caves from the Second Temple period were uncovered during salvage monitoring on the eastern slope of the tell. Both caves featured kokhim and contained undecorated fragments of ossuaries.

== Research history ==
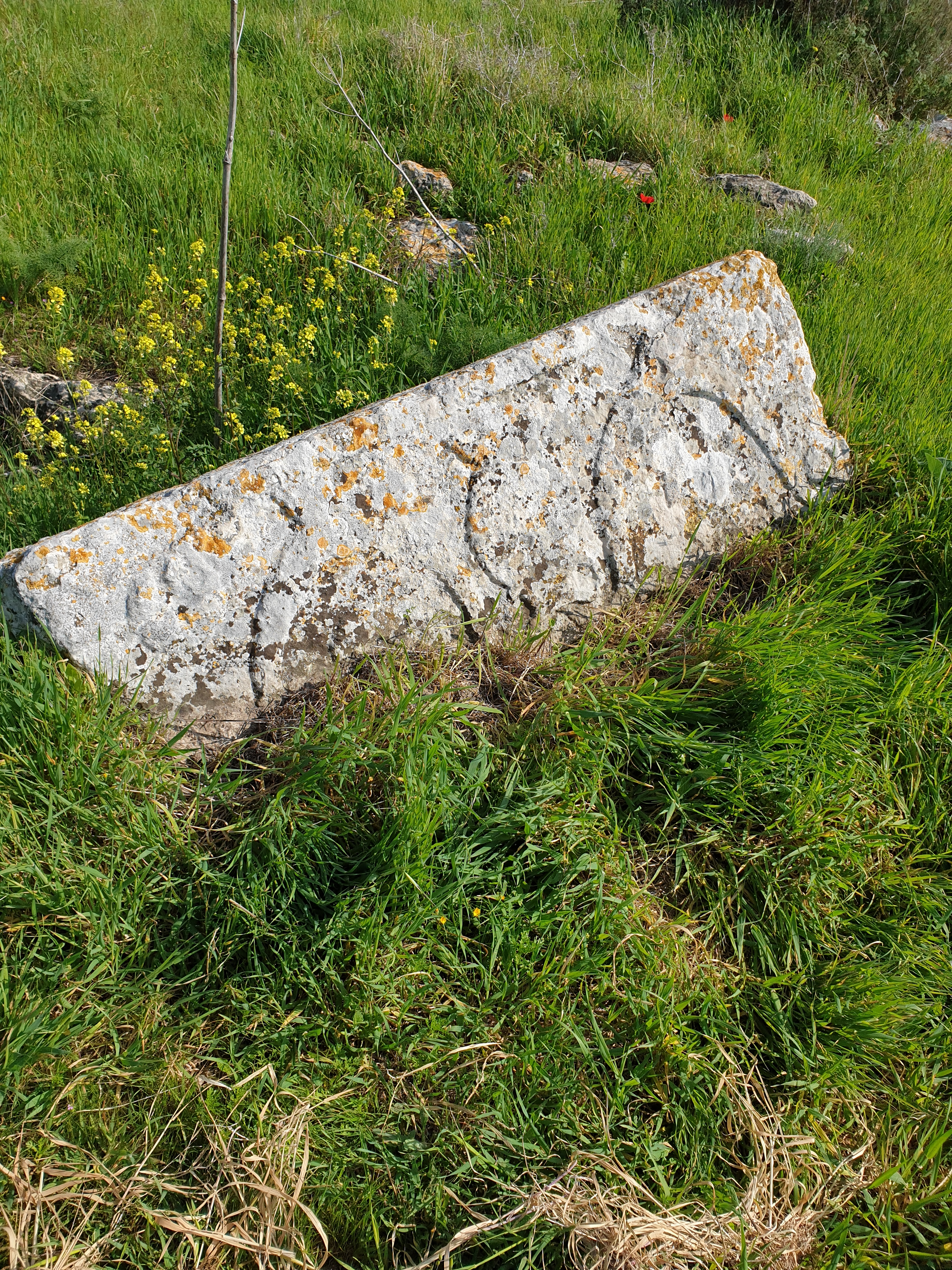
Lintel on the hilltop

Lieut. H. H. Kitchener of the Palestine Exploration Fund visited the site between the years 1874–75 and noted many caves, in one of which there were 120 niches in the wall, apparently used for urns.

During an archaeological survey of the site in 1998, Israel Antiquities Authority archaeologist Boaz Zissu described what appeared to be a "lion's den" at Tel Lavnin (having a side-entrance and an observation point from above), a Second Temple period ritual bath (mikveh), burial tombs from the same period, fortifications, and Byzantine era graffiti on the walls.

In 2001, Zissu, on behalf of the IAA, conducted a second survey of the site, which abounds with burial caves, and contains a columbarium, along with water cisterns carved into the bedrock. A decorated lintel rests at the top of the hill. A small area containing two pits and a room with an arched vault built of ashlar stones was exposed in the northeastern part.

== Conservation ==
In April 2019, the Jerusalem District Planning and Building Committee announced that the site would be incorporated into a new national park in the Judean Lowlands, called the "Lavnin Ridge Nature Reserve and National Park," an area to span over 1,000 dunams (250 acres) within the Mateh Yehuda Regional Council.

== See also ==
- Horvat 'Ethri
- Horvat Midras
- Libnah

== Gallery ==
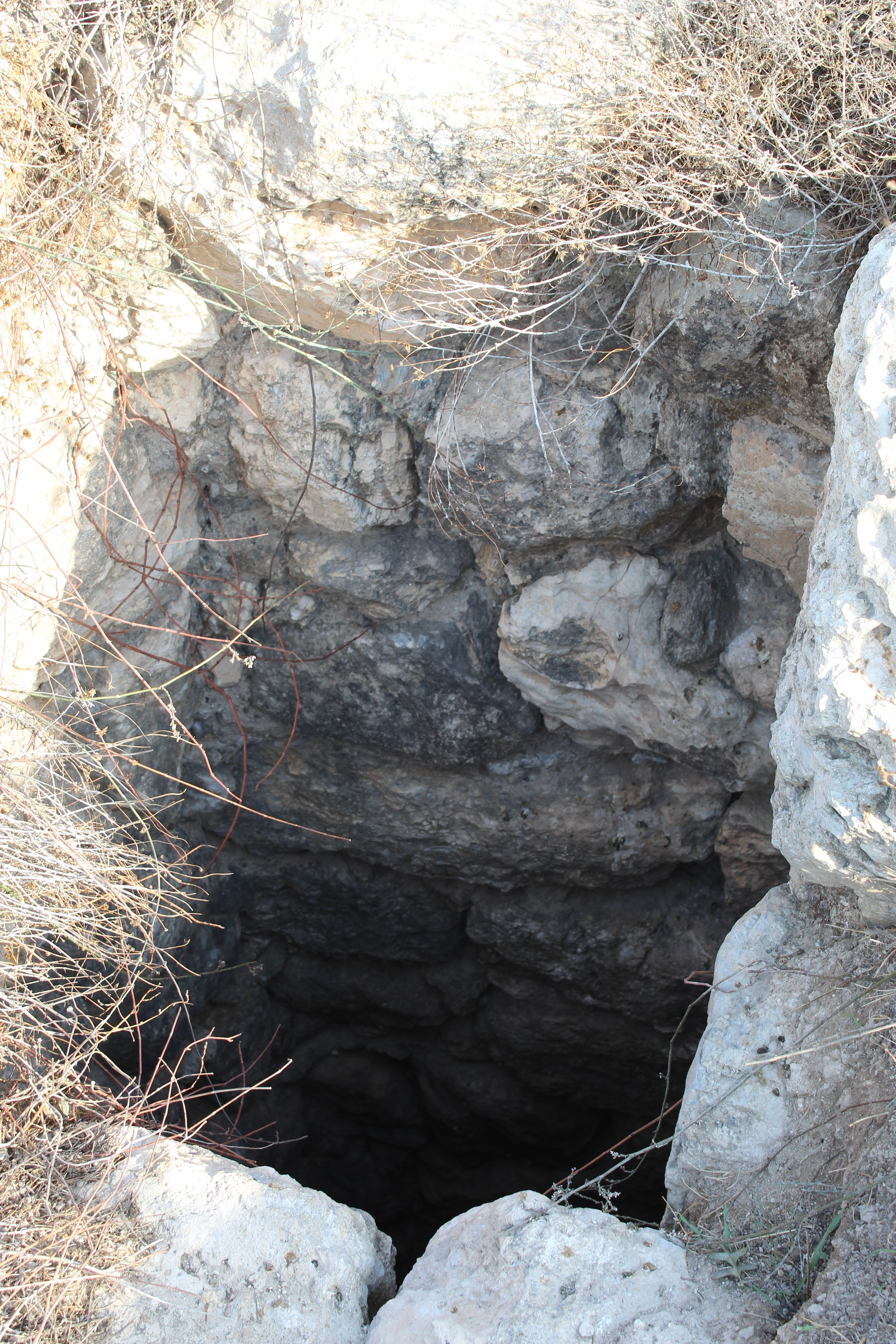
Deep cistern at the Lavnin ruin

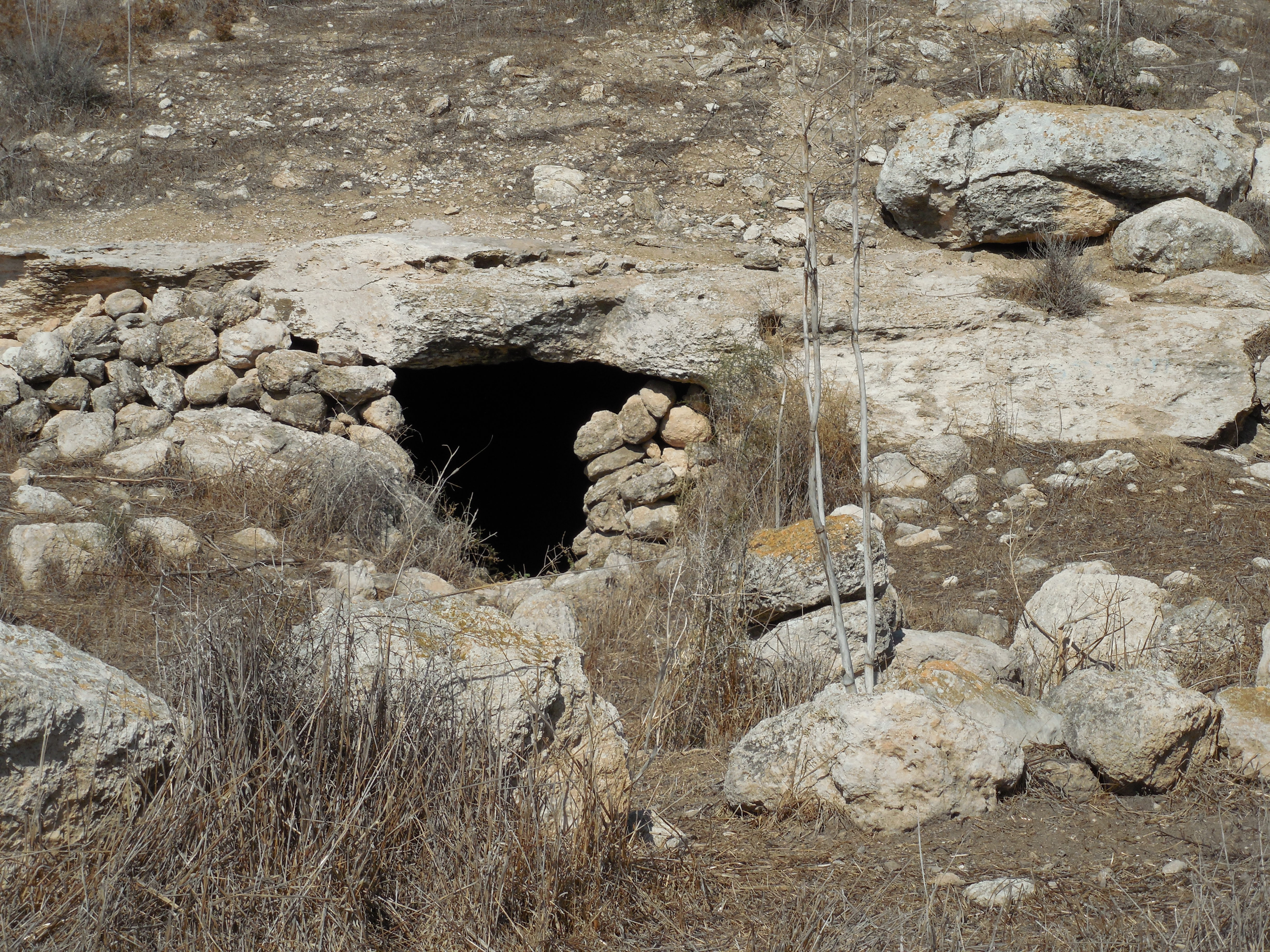
Cave entrance at Lavnin

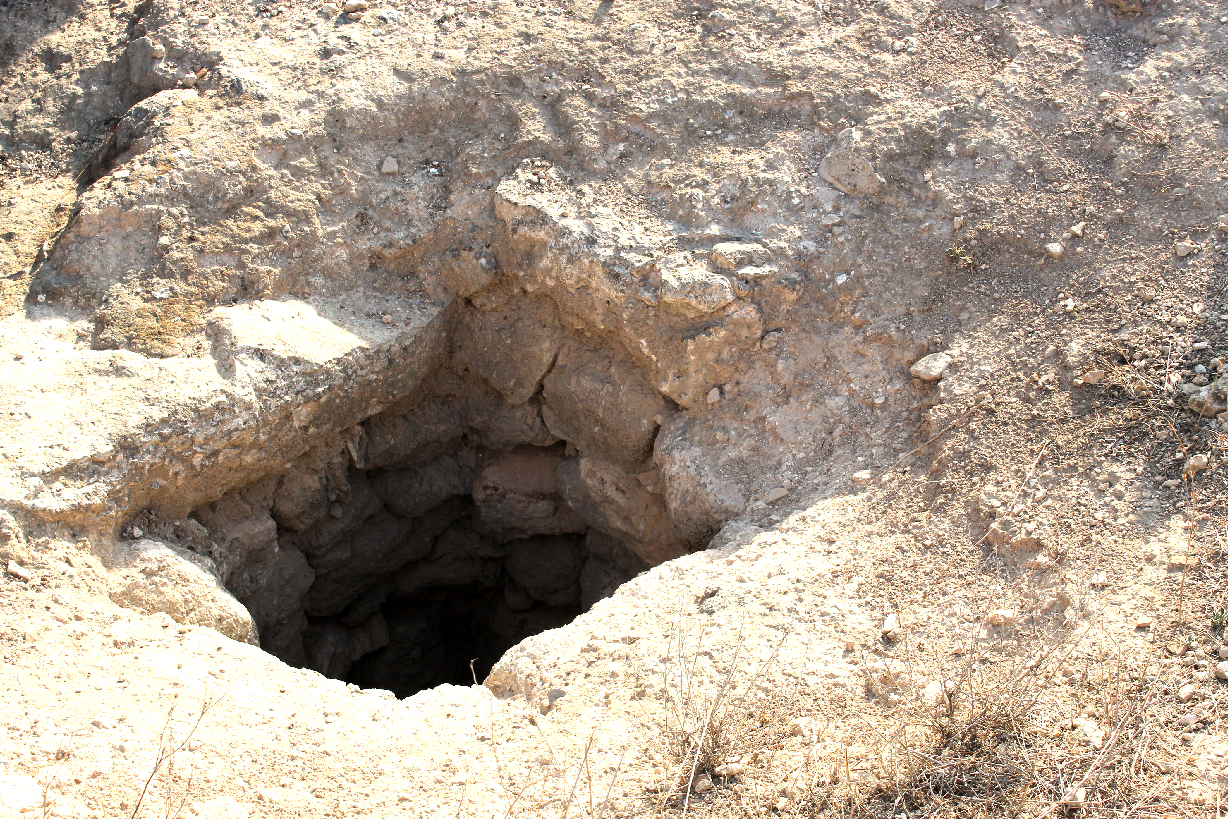
Open pit at the Lavnin ruins

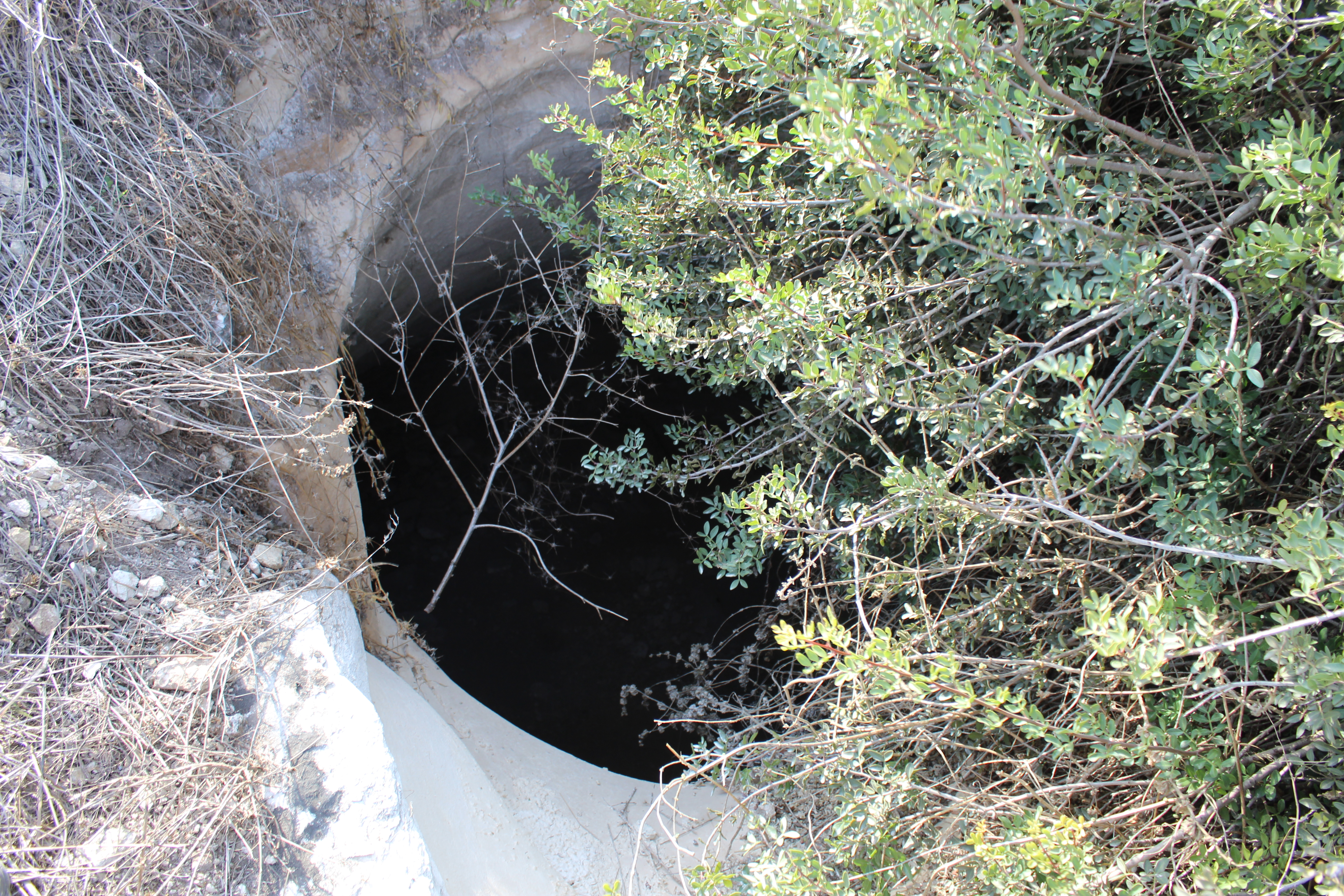
Gaping hole of pit

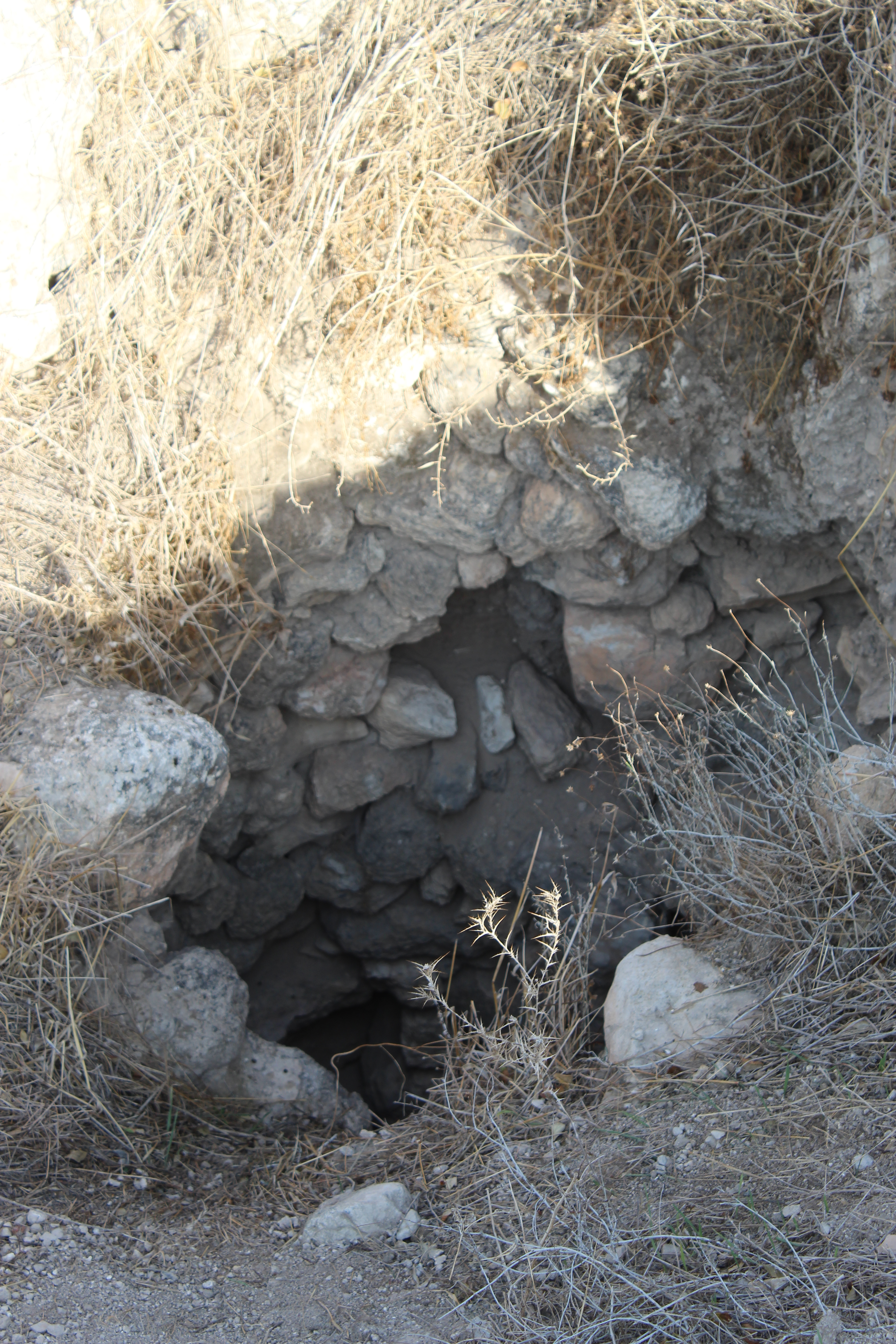
General ruins at Lavnin (Kh. Tell el-Beida)

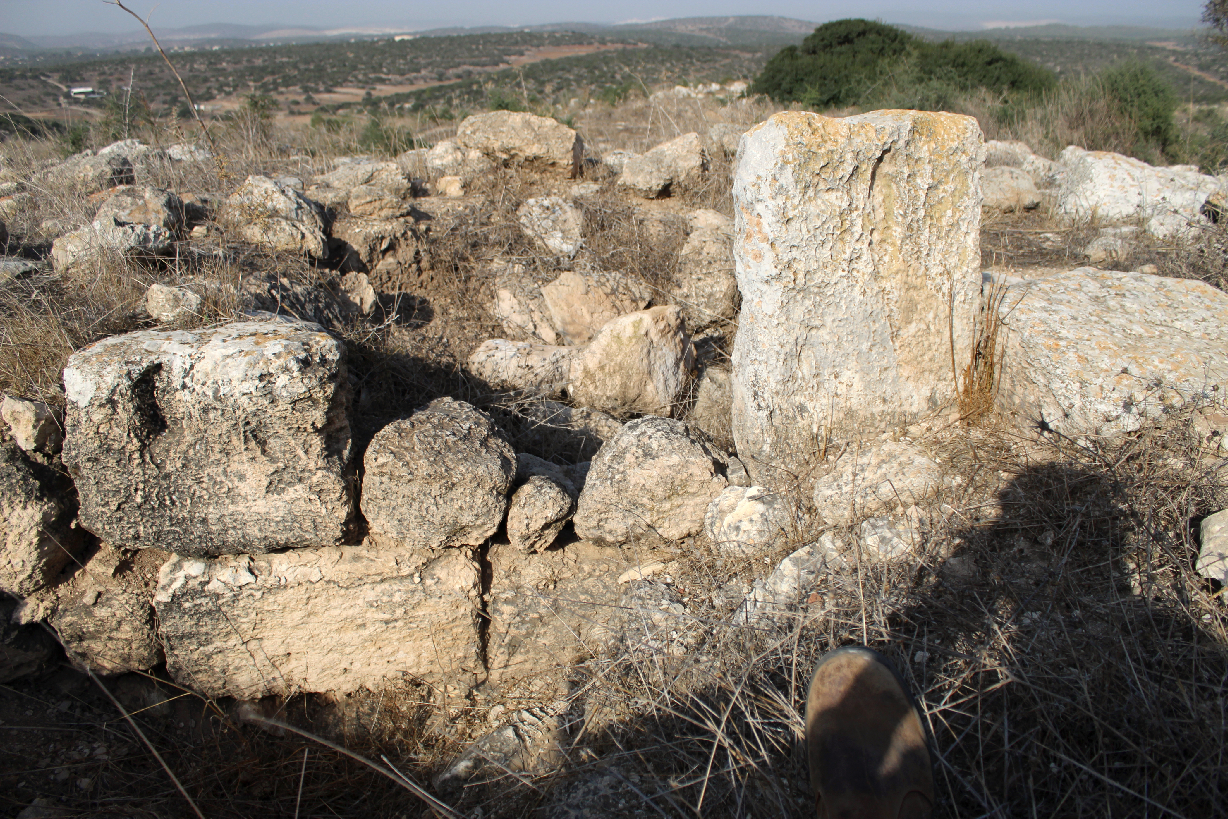
Stone relics at Lavnin ruin

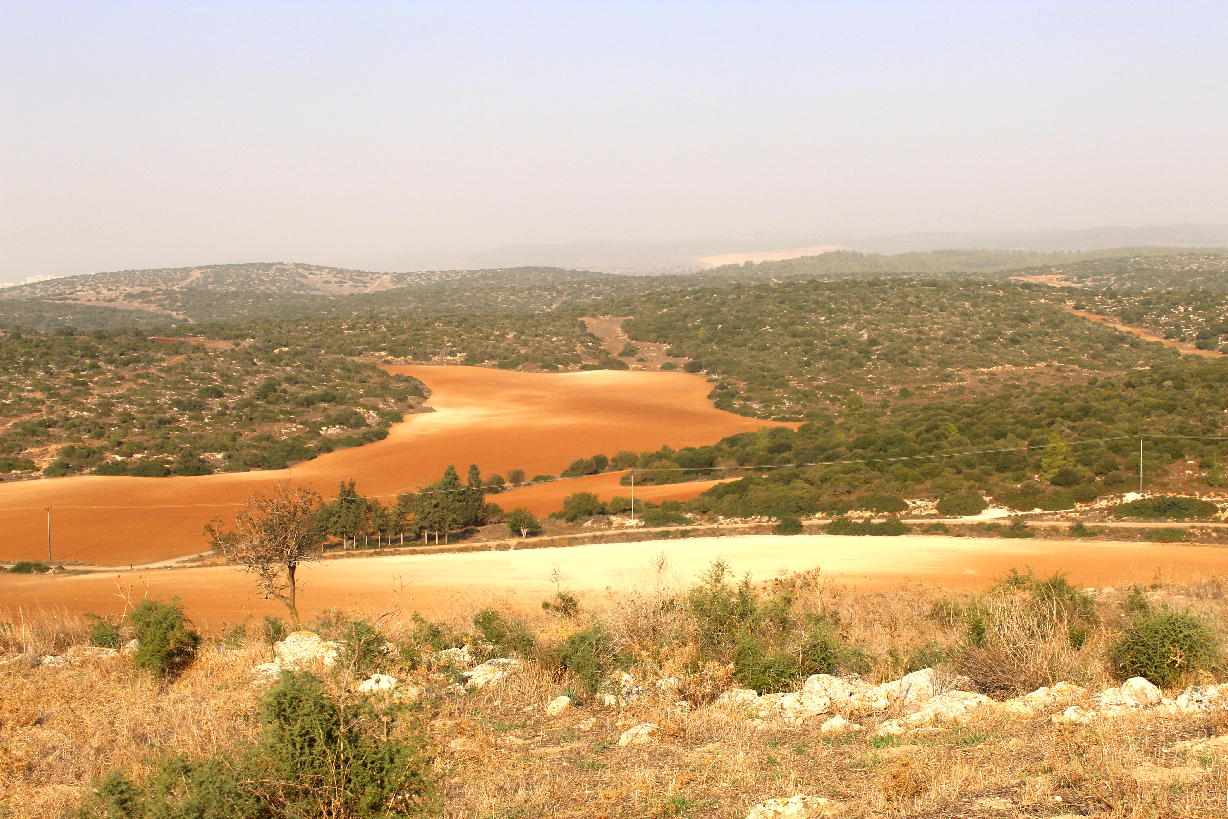
View of valley below Kh. Tell el-Beida

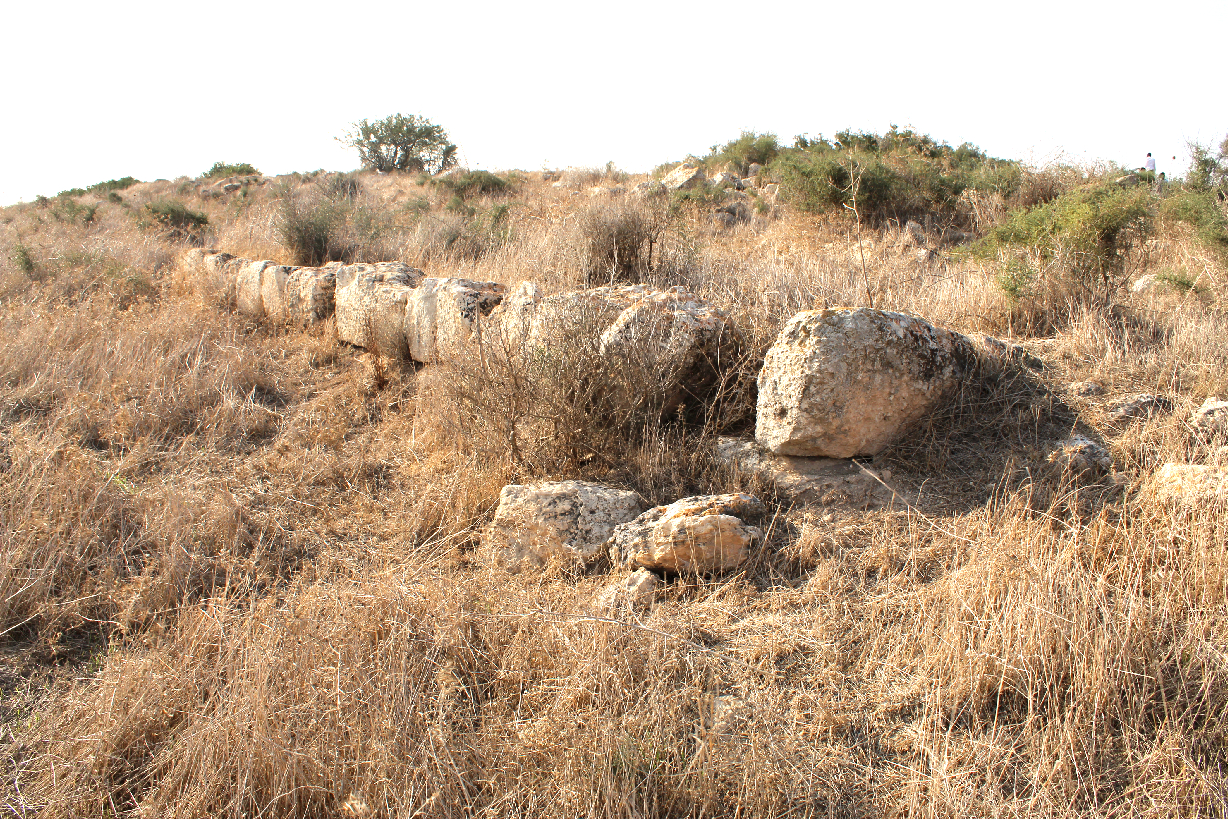
Wall structure at Lavnin

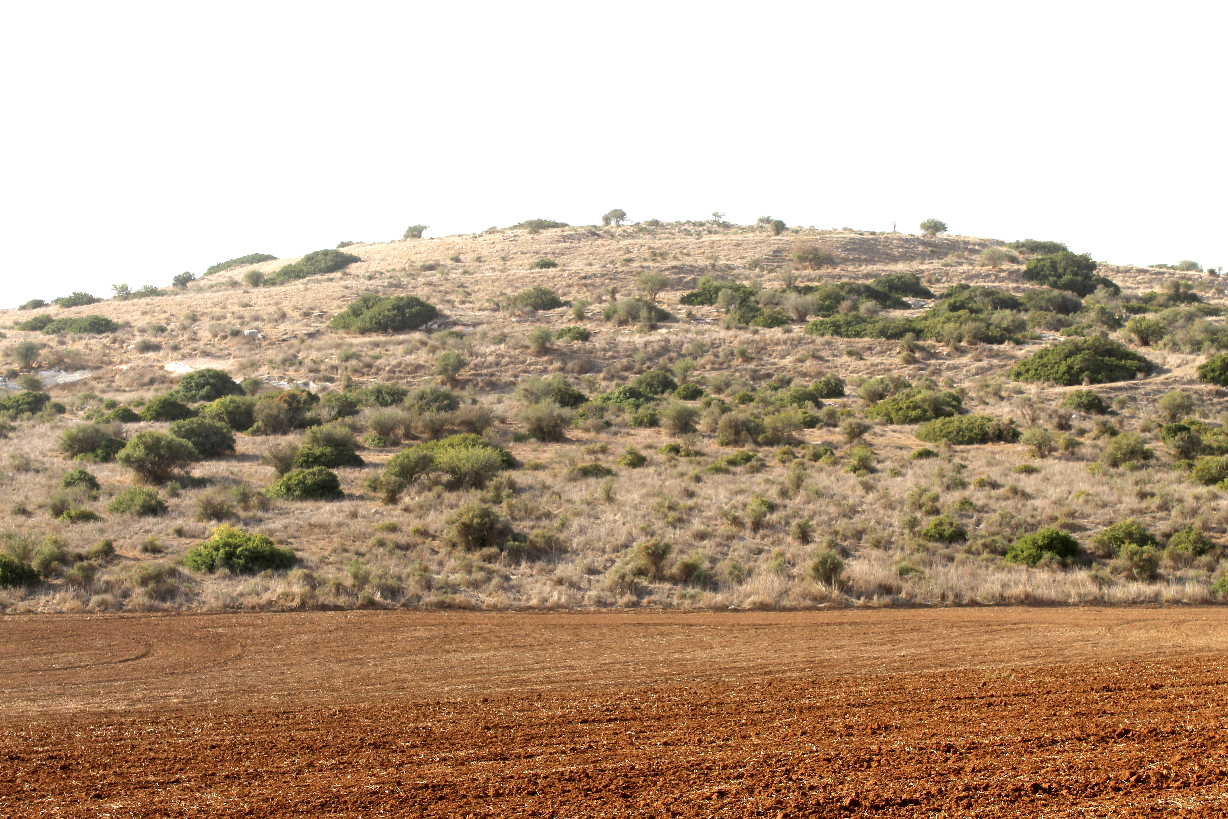
Hilltop ruin of Tell el-Beida (Lavnin)

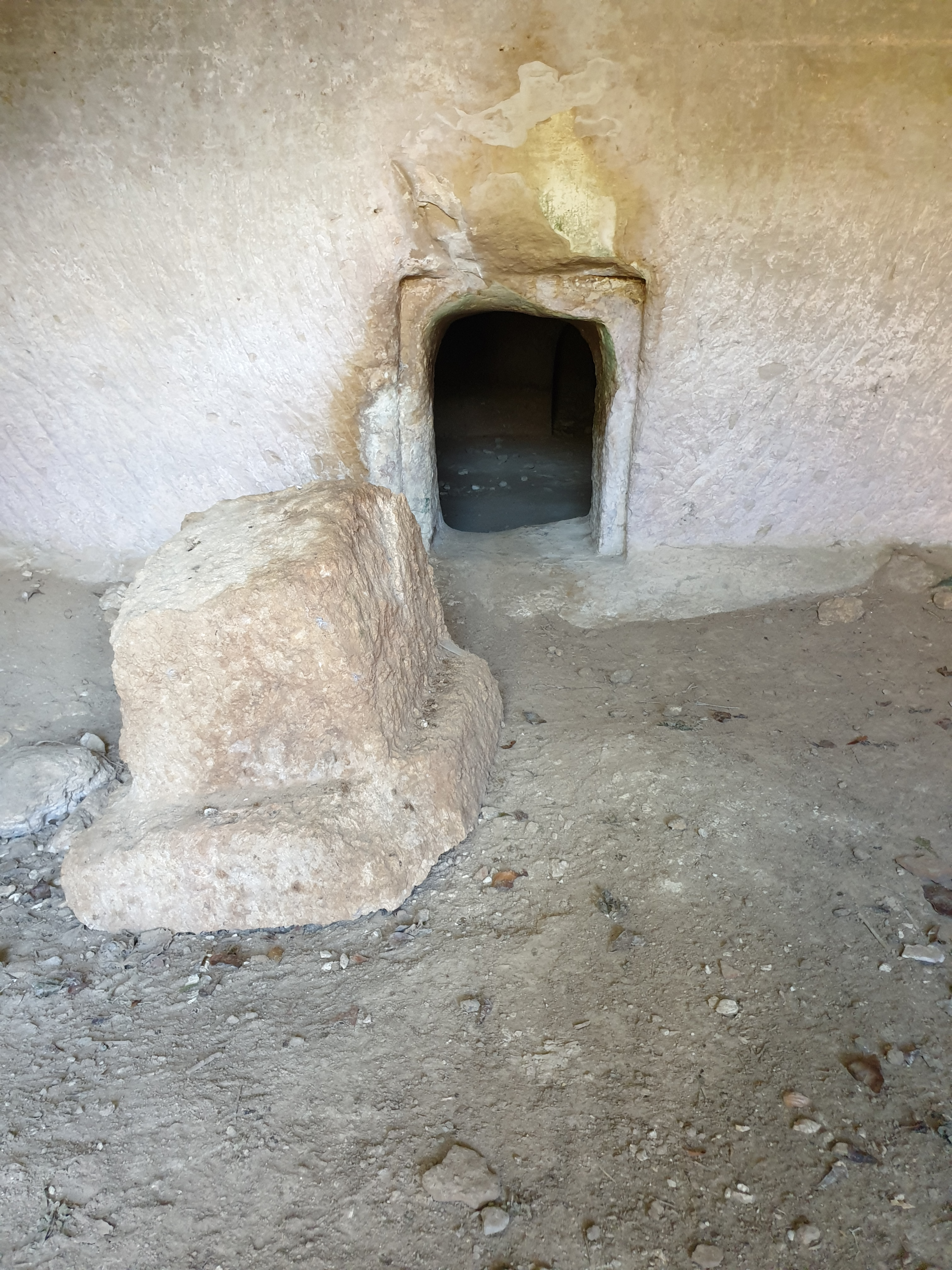
Jewish burial cave and blocking stone

== Bibliography ==
- Albright, W.F. (1921–1922). "Contribution to the Historical Geography of Palestine". The Annual of the American Schools of Oriental Research. 2–3. New Haven: Yale University Press: 1–46. doi:10.2307/3768450. JSTOR 3768450.
- Chapmann III, R.L.; Taylor, J.E., eds. (2003). Palestine in the Fourth Century A.D.: The Onomasticon by Eusebius of Caesarea. Translated by G.S.P. Freeman-Grenville. Jerusalem: Carta. p. 68. ISBN 965-220-500-1. OCLC 937002750., s.v. Lebna
- Conder, C.R.; Kitchener, H. H. (1883). The Survey of Western Palestine: Memoirs of the Topography, Orography, Hydrography, and Archaeology. Vol. 3. London: Committee of the Palestine Exploration Fund.
- Conder, C.R. (1897). "Libnah". Quarterly Statement – Palestine Exploration Fund. 29: 69.
- Hawk, L. Daniel (2010). Joshua in 3-D: A Commentary on Biblical Conquest and Manifest Destiny. Eugene, Ore.: Cascade Books. p. 126. ISBN 9781606088197. OCLC 636959402.
- Kallai-Kleinmann, Z. (1958). "The Town Lists of Judah, Simeon, Benjamin and Dan". Vetus Testamentum. 8 (2). Leiden: Brill: 134–160. doi:10.2307/1516086. JSTOR 1516086.
- Ne'eman, Pinhas, ed. (1963–1966), "כזיב", Encyclopedia of Biblical Geography, Tel Aviv: Yehoshua Tchechik
- Negev, Avraham; Gibson, Shimon (2001). Archaeological Encyclopedia of the Holy Land. New York. ISBN 978-0-8264-1316-1.
- Notley, R. Steven; Safrai, Z. (2005). Eusebius, Onomasticon - The Place Names of Divine Scripture. Leiden: Brill. ISBN 978-0-391-04217-9.
- Palmer, E.H. (1881). The Survey of Western Palestine: Arabic and English Name Lists Collected During the Survey by Lieutenants Conder and Kitchener, R. E. Transliterated and Explained by E.H. Palmer. Committee of the Palestine Exploration Fund.
- Press, Michael D. (2014). "The Arabic Names of Tẹ̄l ʿẸ̄rānī and ʿIrāq el-Menšīye". Zeitschrift des Deutschen Palästina-Vereins. 130 (2). Deutscher verein zur Erforschung Palästinas: 181–193. JSTOR 43664932.
- Rainey, A.F. (1983). "The Biblical Shephelah of Judah". Bulletin of the American Schools of Oriental Research (251): 1–22. doi:10.2307/1356823. JSTOR 1356823. S2CID 163604987.
- Zissu, Boaz [in Hebrew]; Ganor, Amir (2008). "Survey and Excavations at Ḥorbat Burgin in the Judean Shephelah: Burial Caves, Hiding Complexes and Installations of the Second Temple and Byzantine Periods". 'Atiqot. 58: 60–64. JSTOR 23464336.
- Zissu, Boaz [in Hebrew] (1999). "Daniel in the Lion's Den (?) at Tel Lavnin, Judaean Shefelah". Revue Biblique (in French). 106 (4). Jerusalem: 563–573. JSTOR i40170804.
- Zissu, Boaz (2001). "חורבת לבנין". Hadashot Arkheologiyot: Excavations and Surveys in Israel / חדשות ארכיאולוגיות: חפירות וסקרים בישראל (in Hebrew). 113. Jerusalem: 153–154. JSTOR 23487083.
- Zissu, Boaz; Gass, Erasmus (2011), "The Identification of Biblical Achzib at Khirbet ʿĒn el-Kizbe in the Judean Shephelah, and the Origins of Shimon Bar Kokhba", 'Go Out and Study the Land' (Judges 18:2), Leiden: Brill, doi:10.1163/9789004214132_023, ISBN 9789004214132
