= Robbo =

Robbo is primarily a nickname, often given to those with the surname Robinson or Robson. It may refer to:

== People ==
- King Robbo (1969–2014), English graffiti artist
- Andy Robertson (born 1994), Scottish footballer
- Ashley Robinson (born 1982), Women's National Basketball Association player
- Brian Robertson (guitarist) (born 1956), Scottish rock guitarist best known as a member of Thin Lizzy and Motörhead
- Bryan Robson (born 1957), English footballer and football manager
- Derek Robinson (trade unionist) (1927–2017), trade union spokesman nicknamed "Red Robbo"
- Geoff Robinson (rugby league, born 1957), Australian rugby league footballer
- John Robertson (politician, born 1962) (born 1962), Australian politician
- Mark Robinson (journalist) (born 1967), Australian sports journalist
- Michael Roberts (footballer) (born 1959), Australian rules footballer and television sports reporter
- Paul Robinson (footballer born December 1978), English footballer
- Peter Robertson (triathlete) (born 1976), Australian triathlete
- Russell Robertson (born 1978), Australian rules footballer
- Gary Robson (darts player) (born 1967), English darts player nicknamed "Big Robbo"

== Fictional characters ==
- Robbo, hero of the movie Robin and the 7 Hoods, played by Frank Sinatra
- Robbo (Home and Away), from the Australian soap opera Home and Away
- Robbo Slade, from the Australian soap opera Neighbours

== Other uses ==
- Robbo (video game), a 1989 game for the Atari XL/XE and other platforms
- Rebbo or Robbo, an archaeological site in Israel
- Robertson, New South Wales, a village known as Robbo to locals
