= Adullam-France Park =

National Park and Nature Reserve in Israel

Adullam-France National Park
- פארק עדולם-צרפת
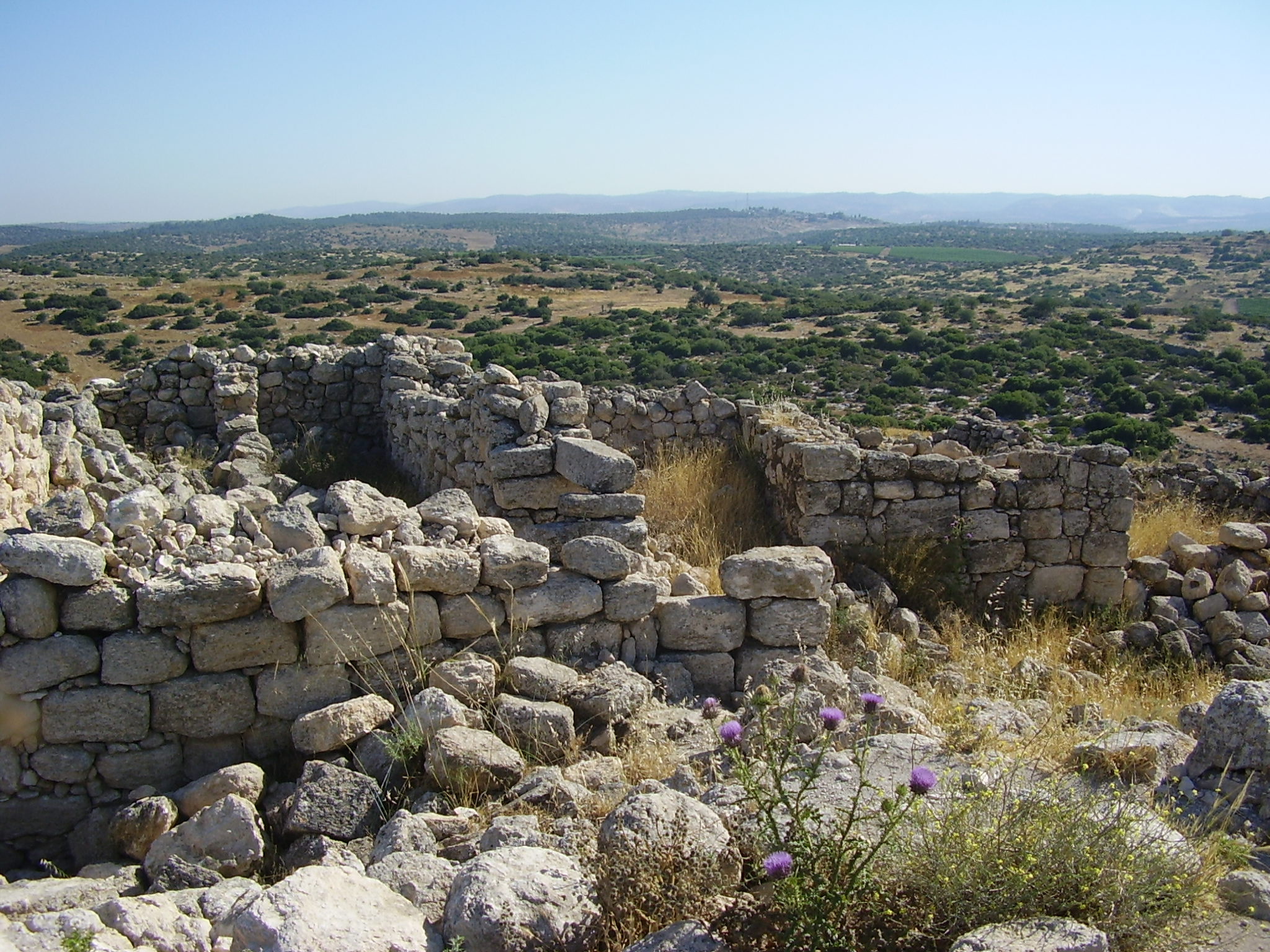
- Lookout point at Hurvat Burgin
- Interactive map of Adullam-France National Park
- Nearest city: Beit Shemesh
- Coordinates: 31.6522848°N 34.95609°E
- Established: 2008
- Website: www.kkl-jnf.org/tourism-and-recreation/forests-and-parks/adulam-france-park.aspx

Adullam-France Park (Hebrew: פארק עדולם-צרפת), also known as Parc de France-Adoulam, is a sprawling park of 50,000 dunams (50 km^{2}; 19 sq mi)(ca. 12,350 acres) in the Central District of Israel, located south of Beit Shemesh. The park, established in 2008 for public recreation, features two major hiking and biking trails, and four major archaeological sites from the Second Temple period. It stretches between Naḥal Ha-Elah (Highway 375), its northernmost boundary, to Naḥal Guvrin (Highway 35), its southernmost boundary. To its west lies the Beit Guvrin-Beit Shemesh highway, and to its east the "green line" – now territories under joint Israeli-Palestinian Arab control – which marks its limit.

== Park features ==
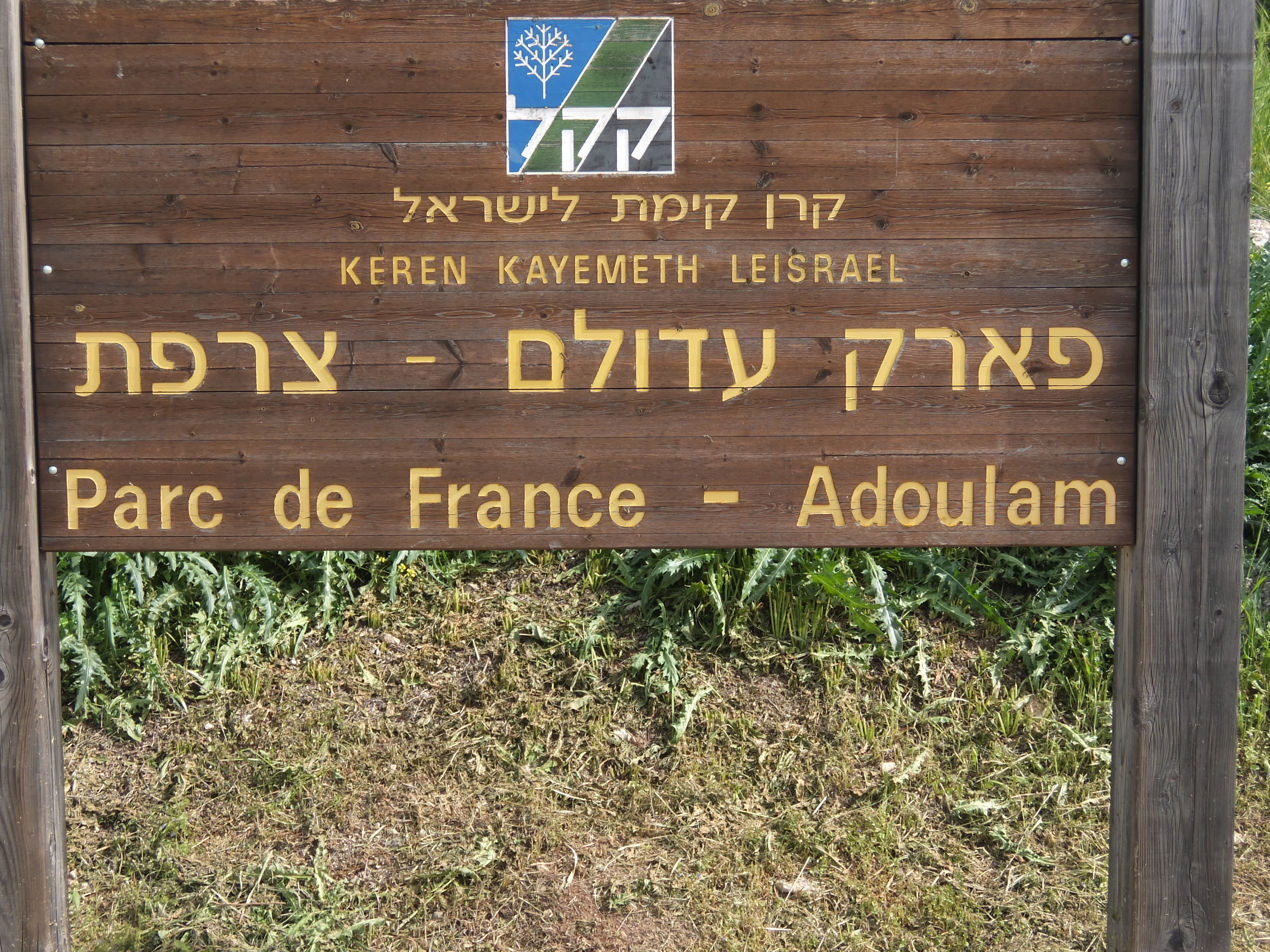
Sign at entrance to Adullam-France Park

The park's main attraction is its pristine, unspoiled beauty; gently rolling limestone hills clad in natural Mediterranean vegetation of underbrush (Sarcopoterium), oak trees (Quercus calliprinos), lentisk (Pistacia lentiscus), carobs (Ceratonia siliqua) and buckthorns (Rhamnus lycioides), including seasonal flowers endemic to the Land of Israel (anemones, cyclamens, almond blossoms and asphodels), all within the purlieu of Jerusalem. The hills are interspersed with low-lying riverine brooks. A section of the park has been planted with pine forests by early Jewish immigrants who settled in the Lachish region at the founding of the State. The park is replete with a picnic area, a lookout point and marked trails for hikers and bikers. The main bike trail, known as the Kanim Single Track, is made in the form of a loop and extends to a full 23-kilometers, traversing the park from west to east, and is suitable for experienced cyclists with a moderate level of technical ability. The other bike trail is known as the Illegal Resident's Trail. Within the confines of the park are four principal archaeological sites of historical importance: Adullam, Horvat 'Ethri, Ḥurvat Burjin (Burgin ruins) and Ḥurvat Madras (Midras ruins), including two lesser known archaeological sites, Ḥurvat Kanim and Ḥurvat Rebbo, and the Adullam Grove Nature Reserve. Remnants of other ancient settlements are known to dot the hilltop landscape. The park is run jointly by the Jewish National Fund (JNF – KKL), the Israel Nature and Parks Authority (INPA) and the Israel Antiquities Authority (IAA), and has a visitors' center with guided tours run by the Kfar Etzion Field School. The park also caters to limited agricultural needs, such as in viniculture.

== Etymology ==
The park takes its name from the biblical Adullam, now a ruin, but where King David once found refuge when he fled from Saul.

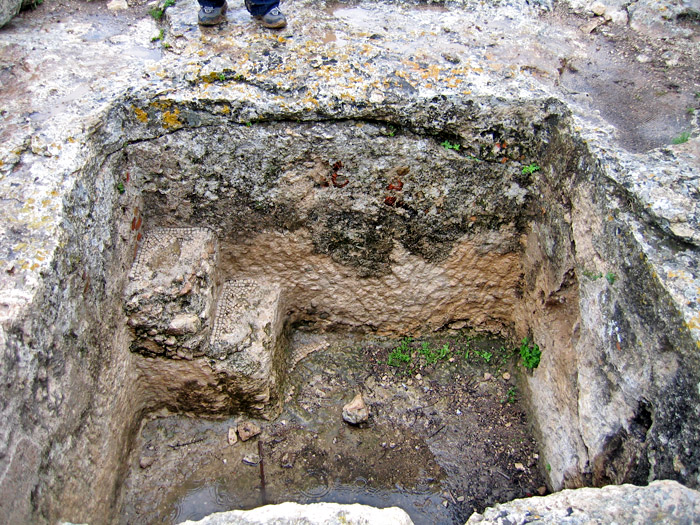
The vat of a winepress, at Hurvat Itri

== Main archaeological sites ==
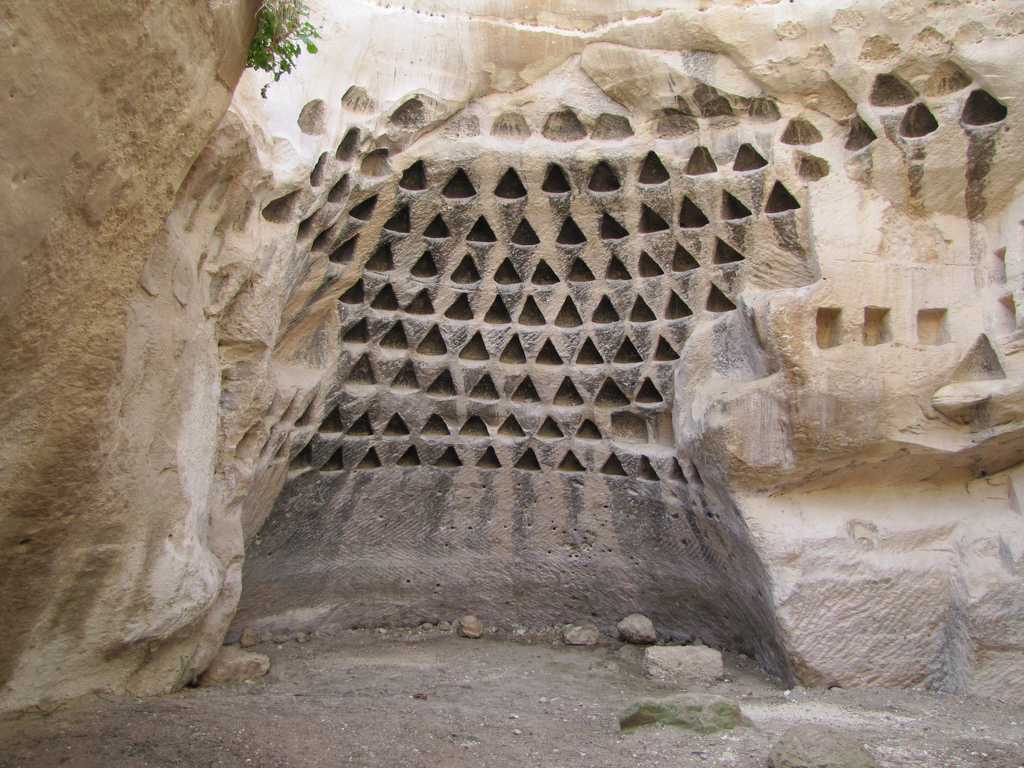
Columbarium cave in Hirbat Midras

- Ḥurvat Burgin (31.636667°N 34.969722°E), a site maintained by the JNF (KKL) in Israel, and where extensive archaeological excavations have been conducted. The site features ancient burial tombs, and a labyrinth of underground hiding places believed to have been associated with the Bar Kokhba era, a Roman villa, columbarium (dovecote), among other things. Until 1948, the Palestinian Arab village Khirbat Umm Burj was here.
- Horvat 'Ethri (31.649472°N 34.972007°E), a partially restored town dating back to the Second Temple period, with a public building believed to be a synagogue, ritual baths, wine presses and caves.
- Ḥurvat Midras (Madras) (31.656545°N 34.936648°E), an archaeological site 32 kilometres (20 mi) south of Jerusalem and dating back to the Bar-Kokhba era, replete with no less than 56 caves and cisterns. The site also abounds with over twenty underground passages, one of which connecting three older cisterns with 50 meters of tunnels, and another connected by 90 meters of tunnels, an ancient burial site with sarcophagus, and a large columbarium. A survey of the site was conducted in 2010 by Amir Ganor and Alon Klein, on behalf of the Israel Antiquities Authority (IAA). The site is located within the Adullam Grove Nature Reserve.

The main entrance to the park is accessible from regional hwy. 38, some 200 metres (660 ft) north of Moshav Givat Yeshayahu, about 10 kilometers (6.2 mi) south of Beit Shemesh. The park houses a visitors' center and an archaeological garden, held in offices run by the JNF (KKL) in conjunction with the Israel Antiquities Authority (IAA). The offices are open Mondays thru Thursdays, from 8:00 AM to 4:00 PM. In it are found artifacts and relics of Israel's distant past for the public's viewing, such as olive presses, ancient milestones, millstones and ossuaries. Additional places of interest in the region are the Elah Valley, Britannia Park and the Luzit Caves.

In 2010, a survey of the Adullam-France Park was conducted by Noygborn Hagit on behalf of Israel Antiquities Authority (IAA).

== See also ==
- Adullam Grove Nature Reserve
- Adullam
- Horvat 'Ethri
- Horvat Midras
- National parks and nature reserves of Israel

== Gallery ==
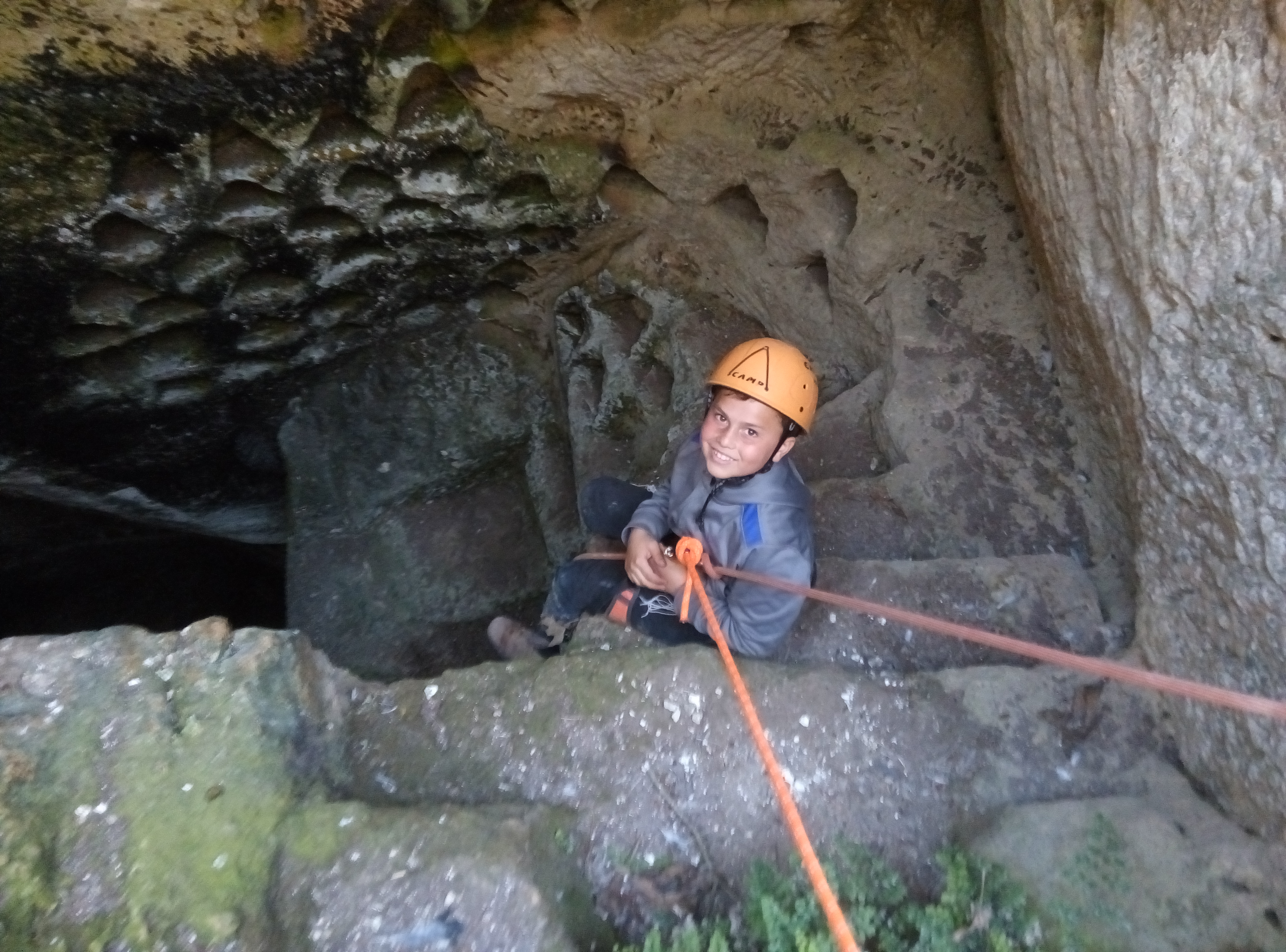
Child rappelling in an underground vault with columbarium (dovecote) at Park

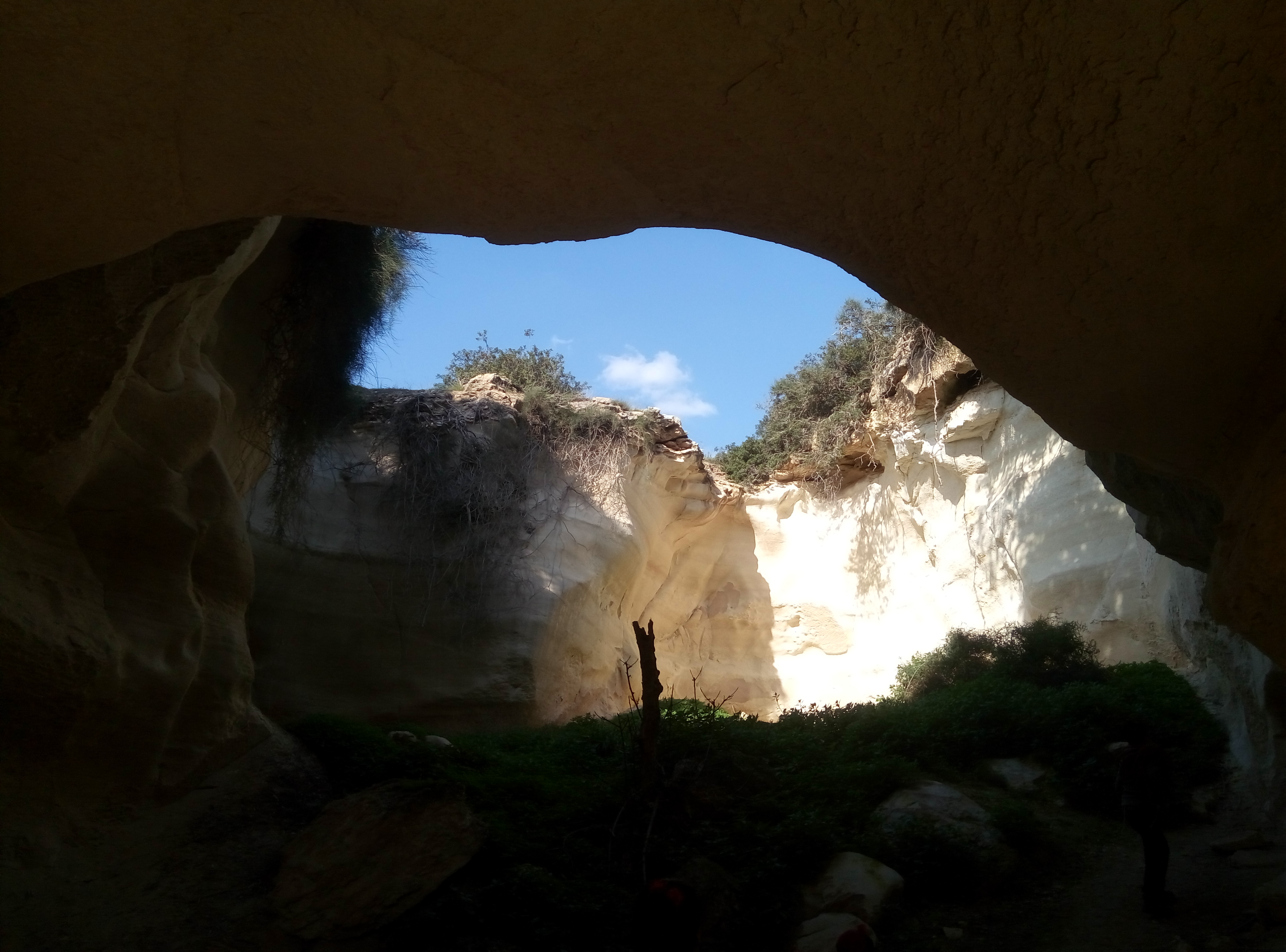
Entrance to large cave in the Adullam-France Park

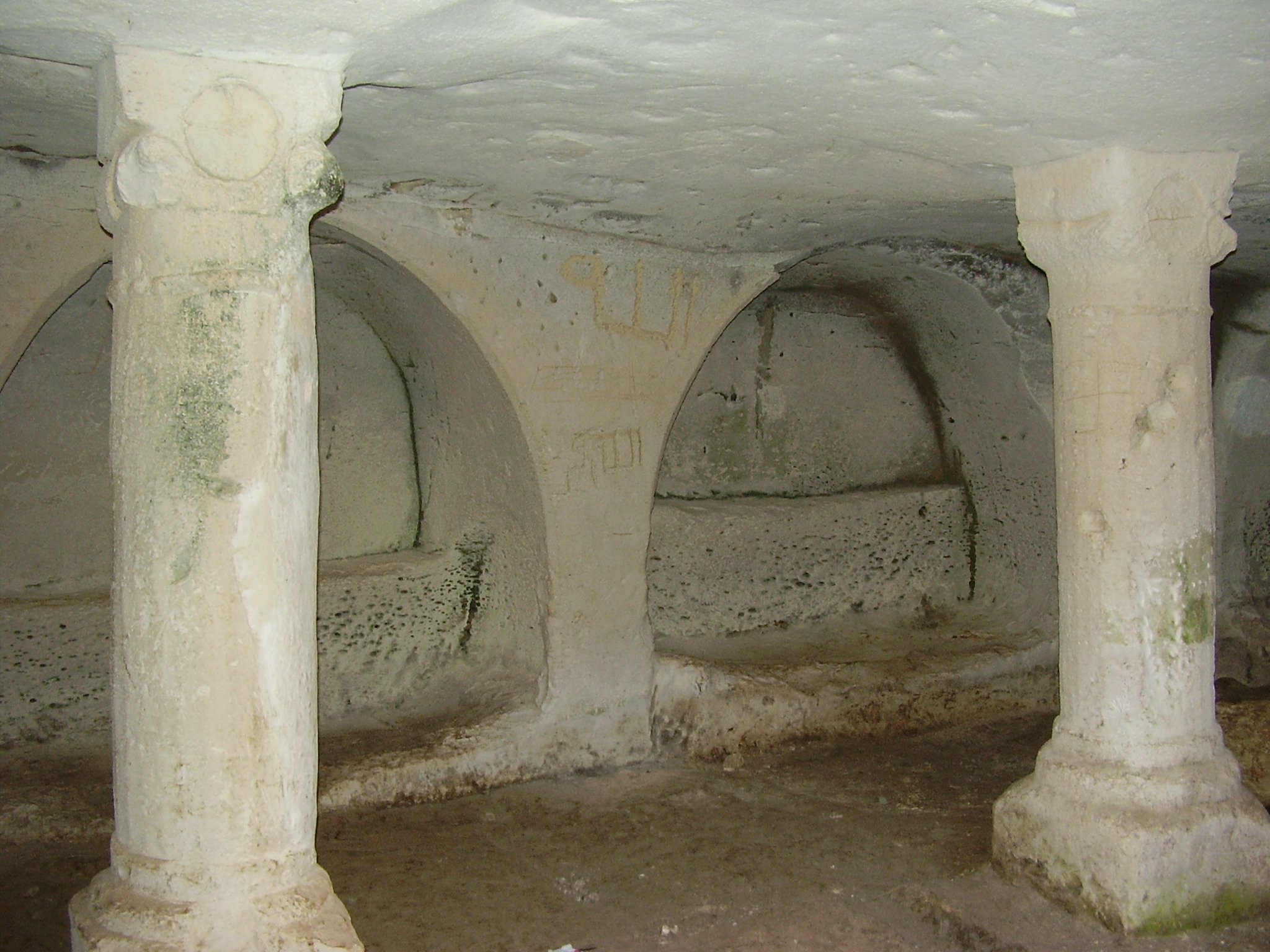
Cave of the columns, Hurvat Burgin

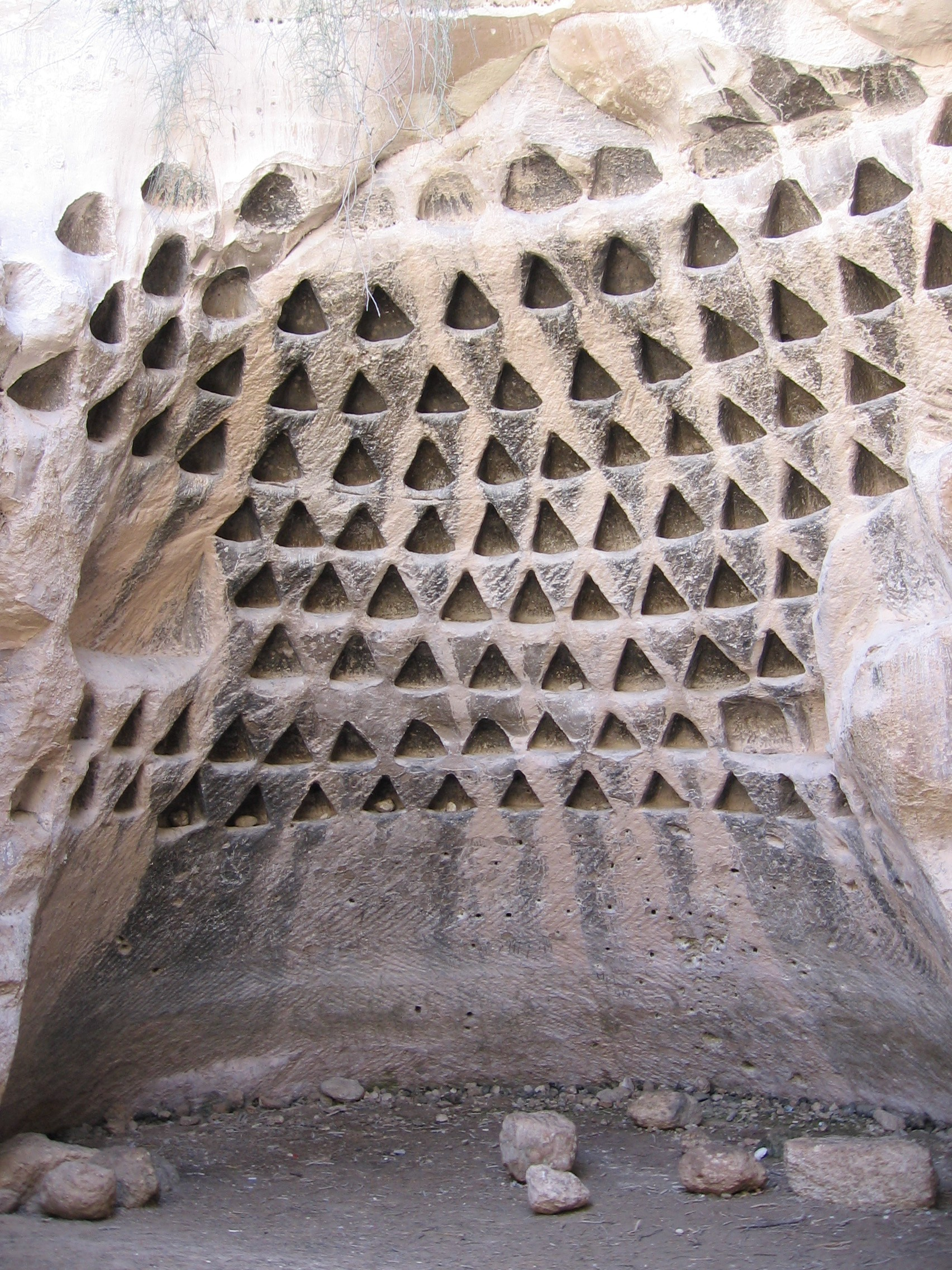
A columbarium in the Midras ruins

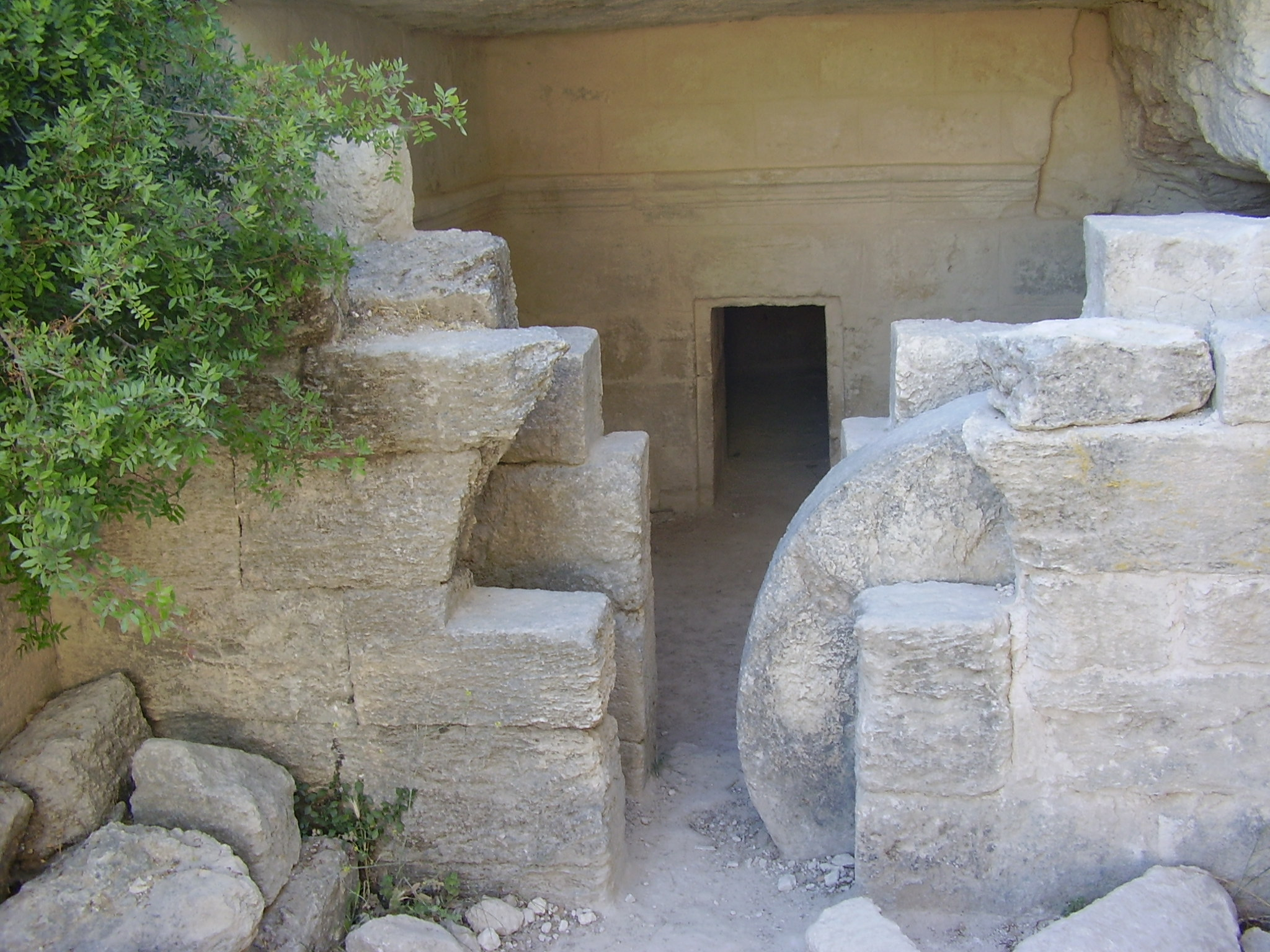
Entrance to a tomb at the Midras ruins

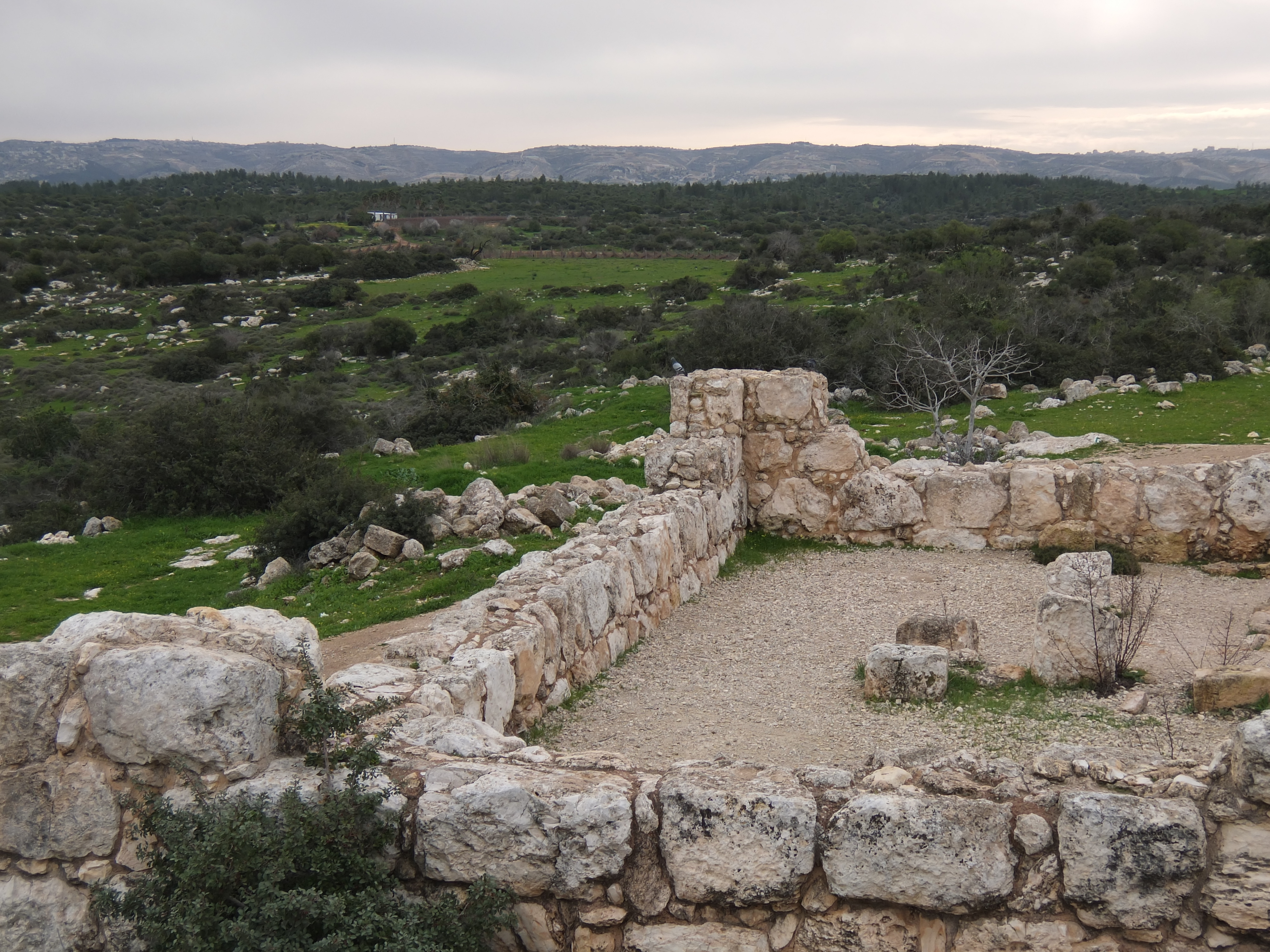
View of Itri ruins

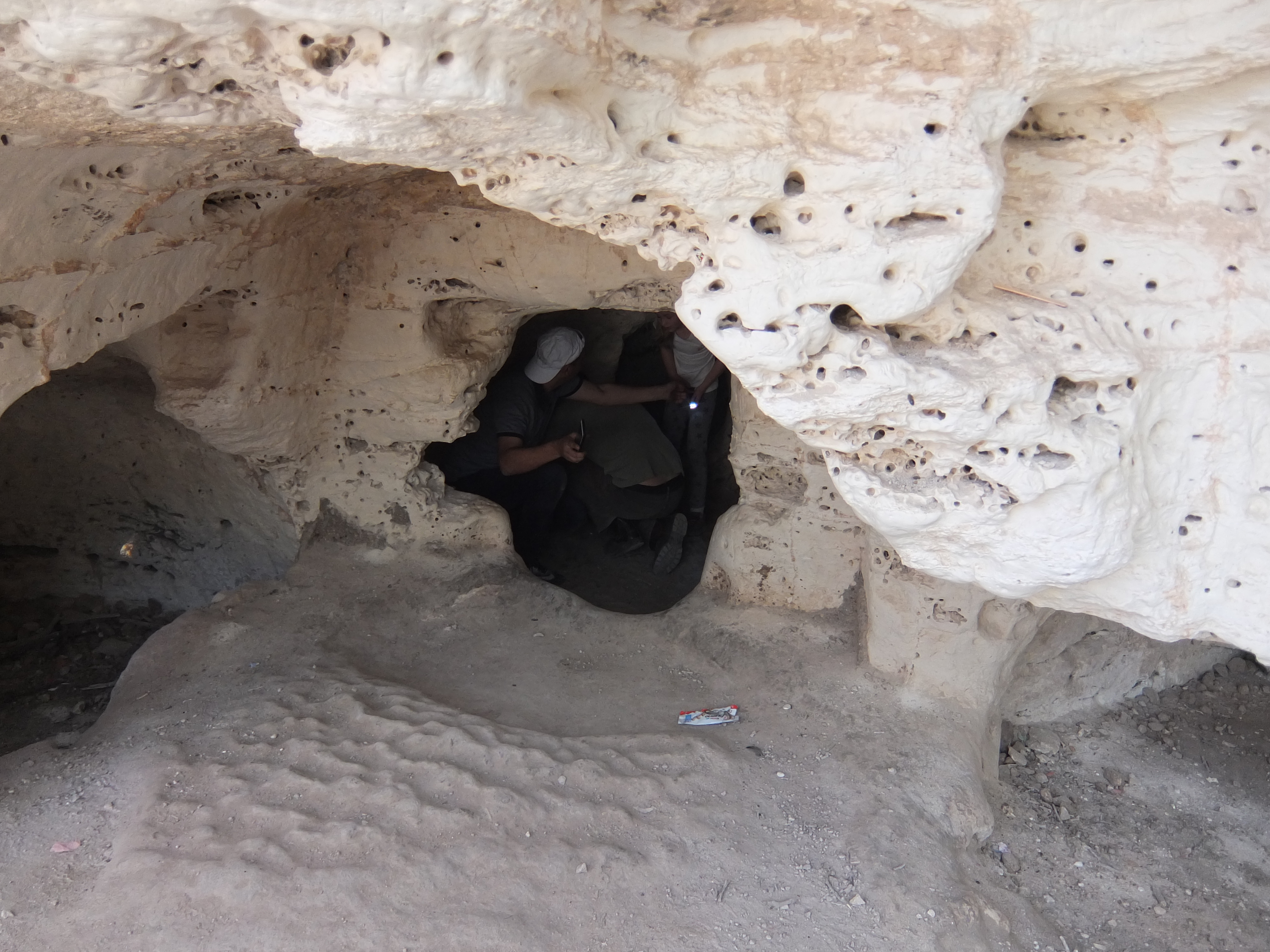
Exploring a tunnel in the Midras Ruin

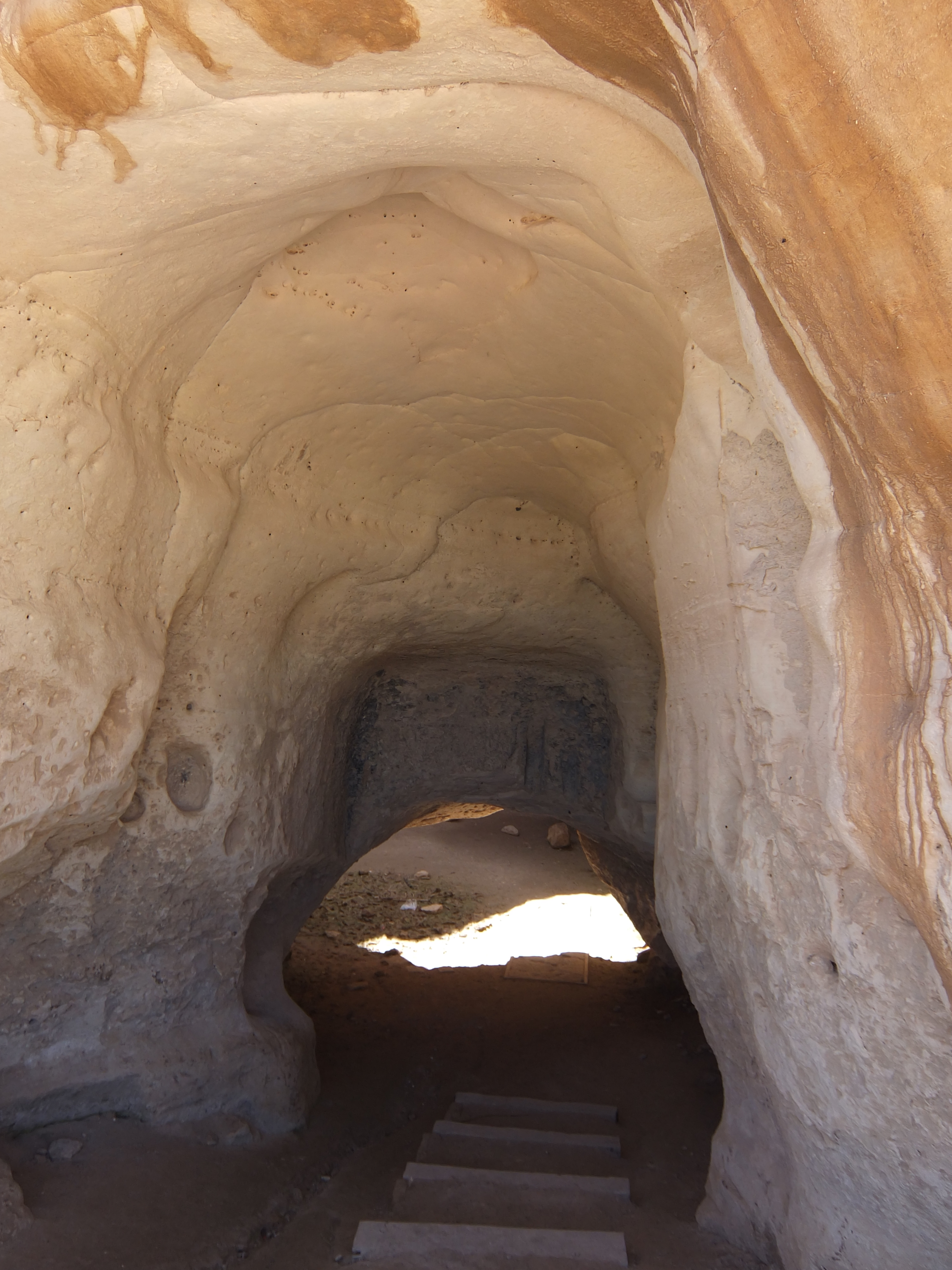
Columbarium at the Midras Ruin

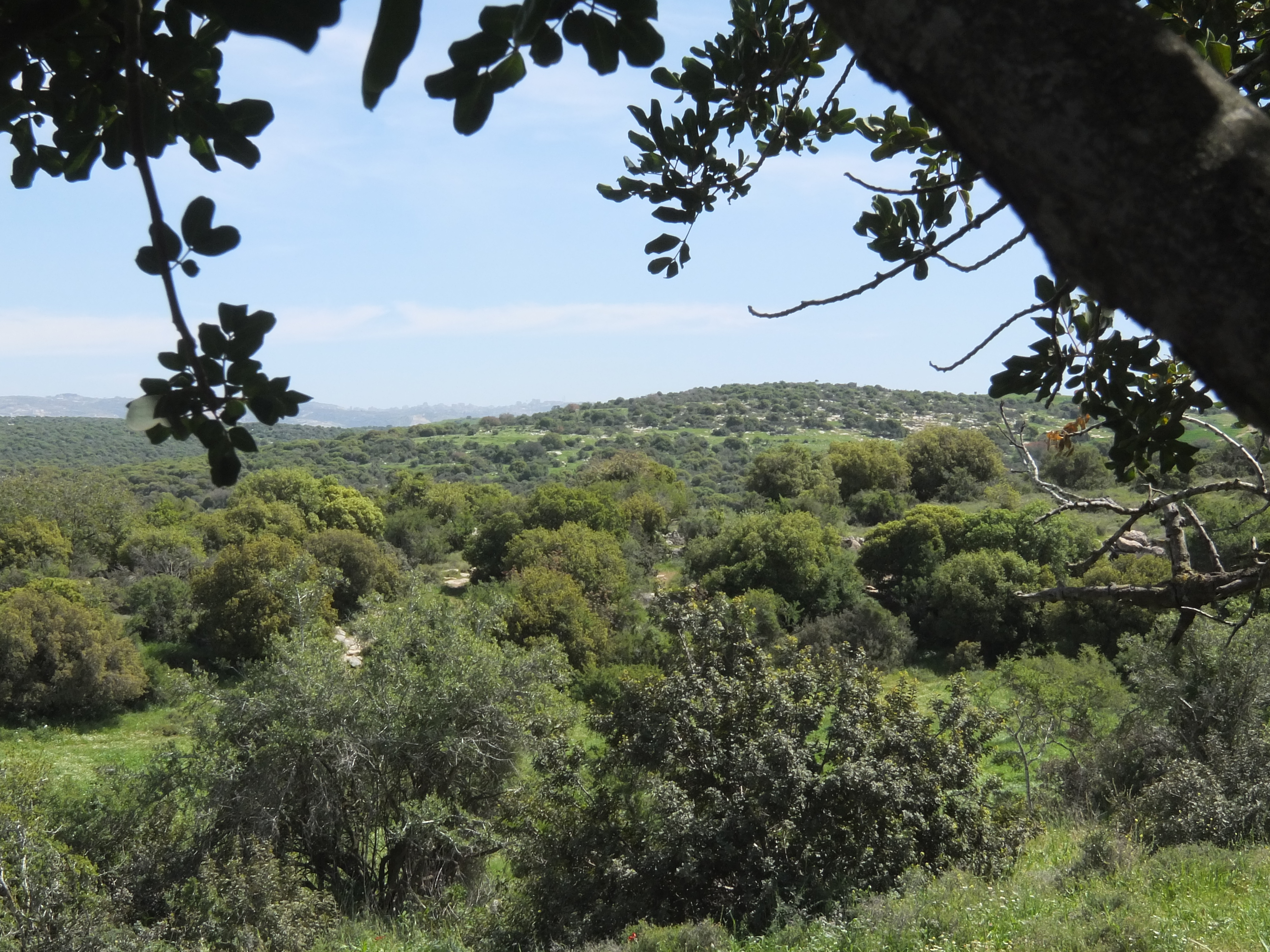
General landscape of the Adullam-France Park

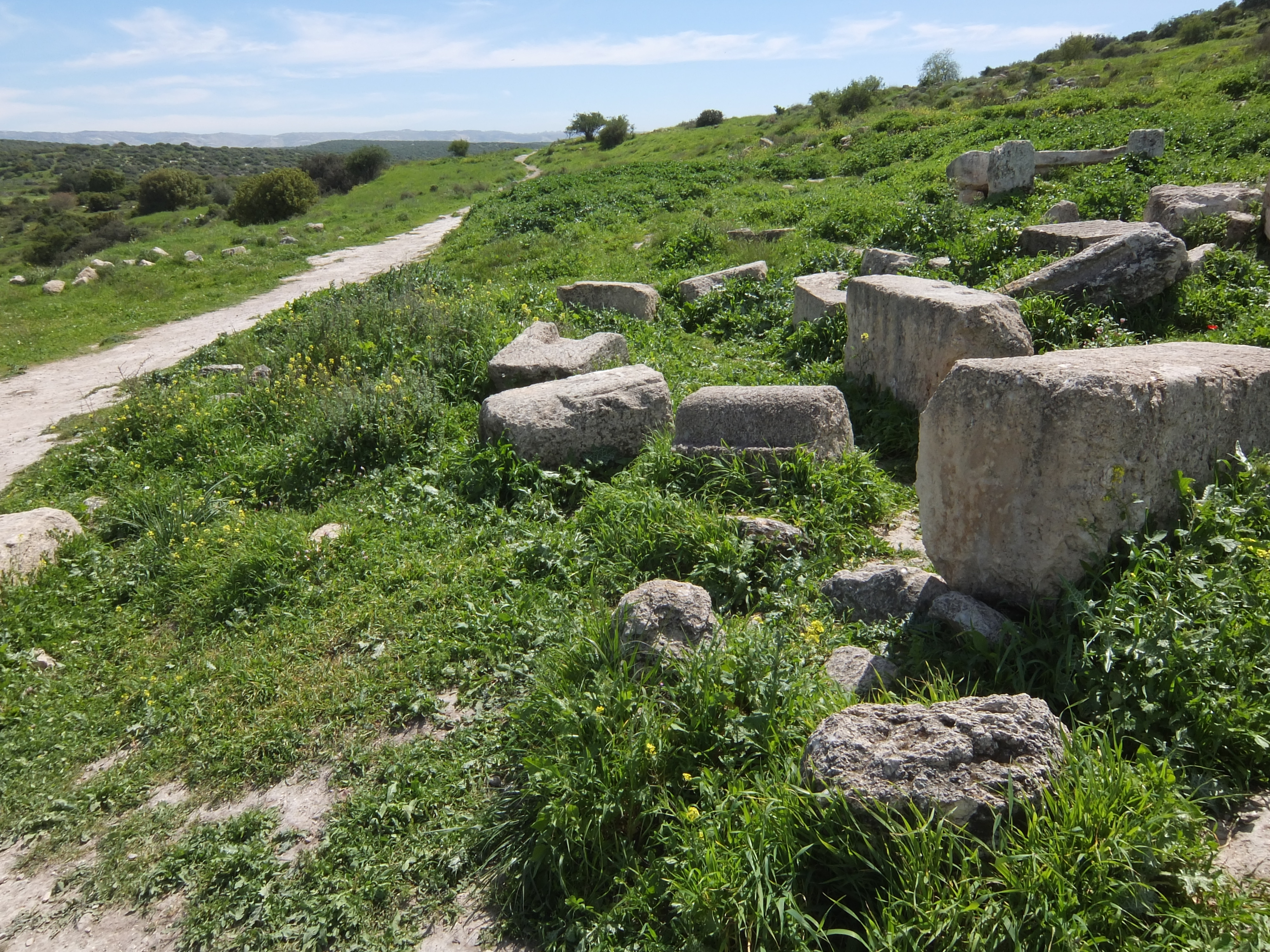
Ruins at the site of Khirbet Midras

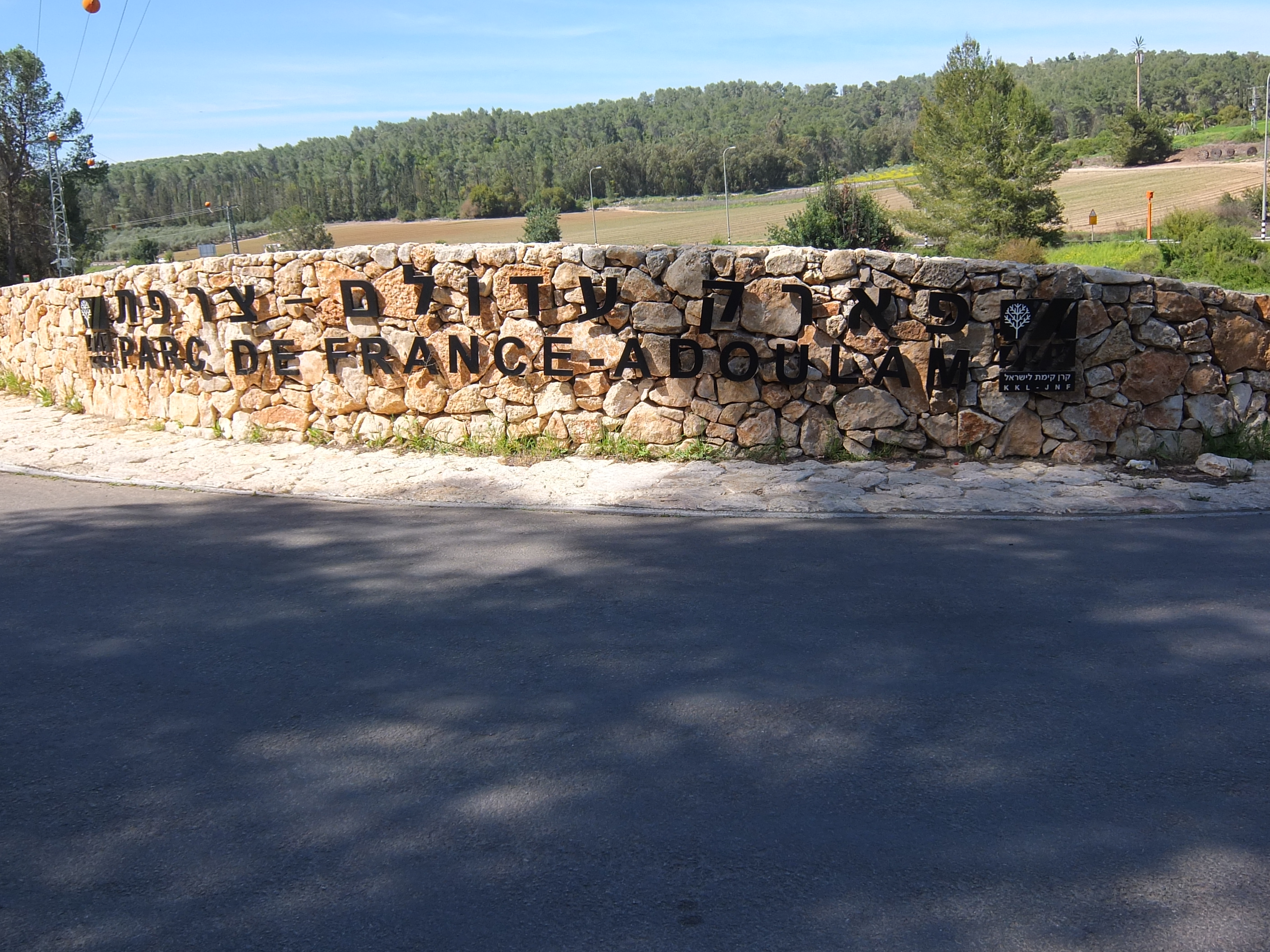
The entrance to the Adullam-France Park

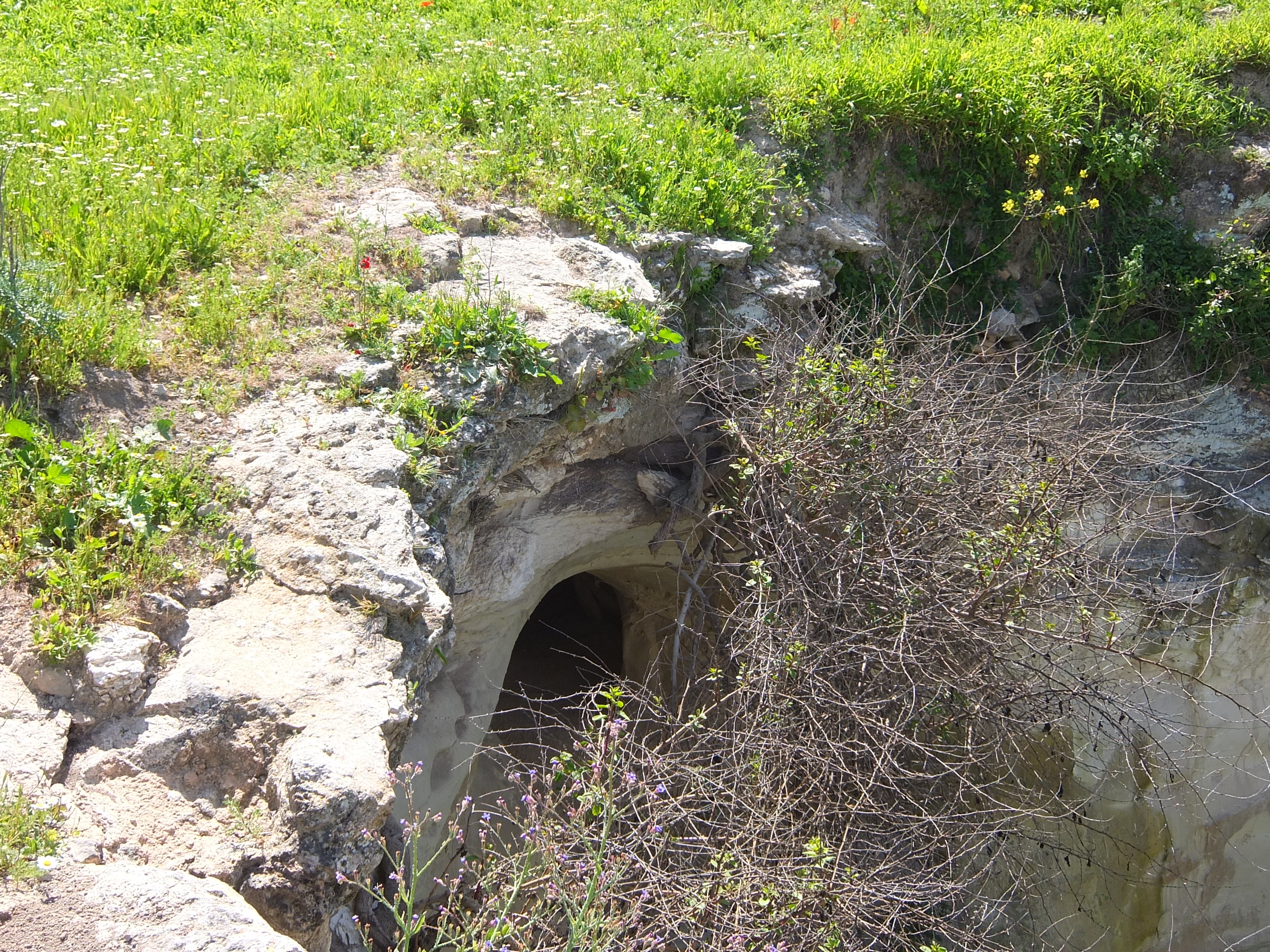
Niche in columbarium, at the Midras ruin
