= Rebbo =

Archaeological site in Israel

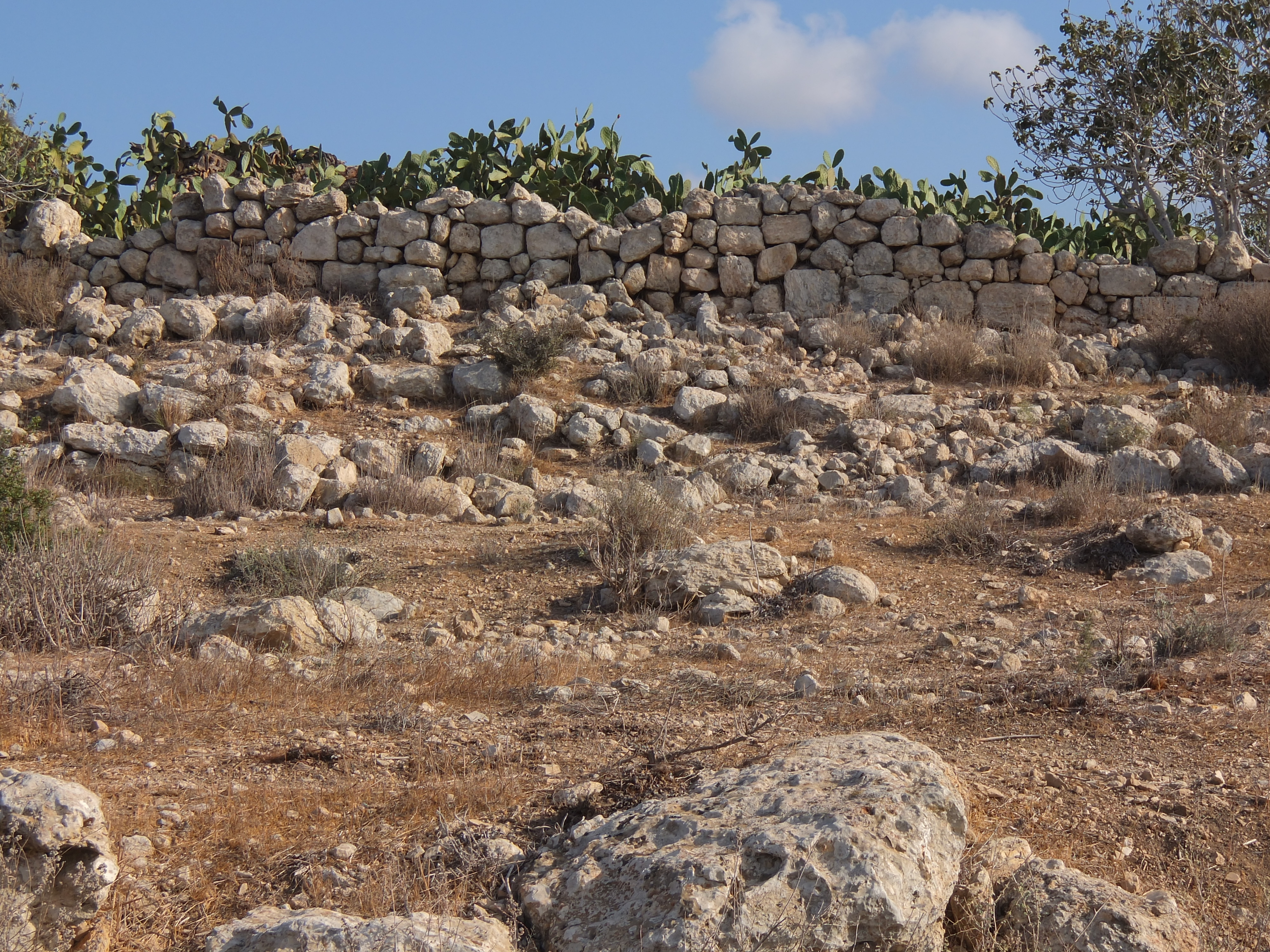
- Dry stone wall at Rebbo

- Location within Israel
- 31°39′51.23″N 34°58′47.833″E
- Grid position: 1481/1183 PAL

Rebbo or Horvat Rebbo (Hebrew: חורבת רִבּוֹא, lit. "Rebbo ruins"), alternative spellings: Robbo, Ribbo; in Arabic Khurbet Rubba (lit. "Rubba ruins"), is an ancient site in Israel, mentioned by Eusebius in his Onomasticon as possibly referring to a site by a similar name in the Book of Joshua. The site, which is now a ruin, sits on a hill 414 metres (1,358 ft) above sea level, in the Shephelah region, and is now part of the Adullam-France Park, maintained by the Jewish National Fund (KKL). It lies about 1.5 km. to the west of Aderet as the crow flies, and about 11 kilometres (7 mi) northeast of Beit Guvrin National Park.

The site is quite extensive and contains tunnels believed to have been in use during the Bar Kokhba revolt. Tombs from the Second Temple period, agricultural features and cisterns (now covered with iron gratings) can be seen on the site. Many lentisk mastic trees (Pistacia lentiscus) and buckthorns (Rhamnus lycioides) cover the site.

== In ancient sources ==
Eusebius (4th century) writes in his Onomasticon that in his day it was a village, called in Koine Greek: Ῥοββώ and situated "in the territory of Eleutheropolis (Beit Gubrin) to the east." (Note: There were two towns bearing nearly the same name; one in the territorial domain of Issachar, called Hebrew: הרבית, romanized: Rabbith, and the other in the territorial domain of Judah, called Hebrew: הרבה, romanized: Rabbah. Both towns are described in Jerome's version of the Onomasticon under the same entry (s.v. Rabboth), although the entry is marked by a lacuna in the Greek Vatican manuscript.) Some have cast doubt on V.L. Trumper's view in Historical Sites in Central Palestine (1918) that Rebbo, located 3 km. west of Adullam, is to be recognised in the name rbt mentioned in the list of Thutmose III, and which place is also called rbt / rbd in the el-Amarna tablets. According to these sources, the king of Jerusalem complained before Pharaoh that certain people from Gezer, from Gath and Keilah had conspired together and forcibly taken away lands belonging to R^{u}b^{u}t^{u}. The site's current name was fixed by the Government Naming Committee in Israel.

== Archaeological surveys ==
=== Victor Guérin (1863) ===
French explorer, Victor Guérin, visited the site, which he called Khirbet Rebba, in 1863, and wrote of his impressions of the site: "The ruins are fairly large and cover the summit and slopes of a hill. Many cisterns and vaults embedded in the rock attest to its great antiquity. The houses, of very small dimensions, were for the most part constructed of medium-sized and generally well squared stones; they litter the ground everywhere with their debris. An edifice, also overthrown from top to bottom, seems to have been a church, which proves that, in the Christian era, this town was still inhabited. Six sections of mutilated columns lie in this place. I also notice, on a beautiful rectangular block, two carved Greek crosses."

=== Conder and Kitchener (1878) ===
The ruin appears in Conder and Kitchener's 1878 Survey of Palestine map under the name Khurbet Rubba. They noted under "Rabba" that it was a "city of Judah, mentioned with Kirjath Jearim (Joshua XV. 60). In the Onomasticon a place called Rebbo is mentioned as east of Eleutheropolis, which might be the same. A good-sized ruin named Rubba is found in the low hills south of the valley of Elah, north-east of Bayt Jibrin, which would be in a suitable position for the early Christian site." They found there "Caves, cisterns, and heaps of stones, ruined walls, bases of pillars and shafts much worn, two lintel stones with crosses, both measuring about 7 feet by 2½ feet."

=== Aapeli Saarisalo (pre-1931) ===
The site was surveyed by Finnish archaeologist Aapeli Saarisalo in the early 20th century, who concluded that the village was inhabited as late as the Byzantine and Early Arab periods.

== Gallery ==
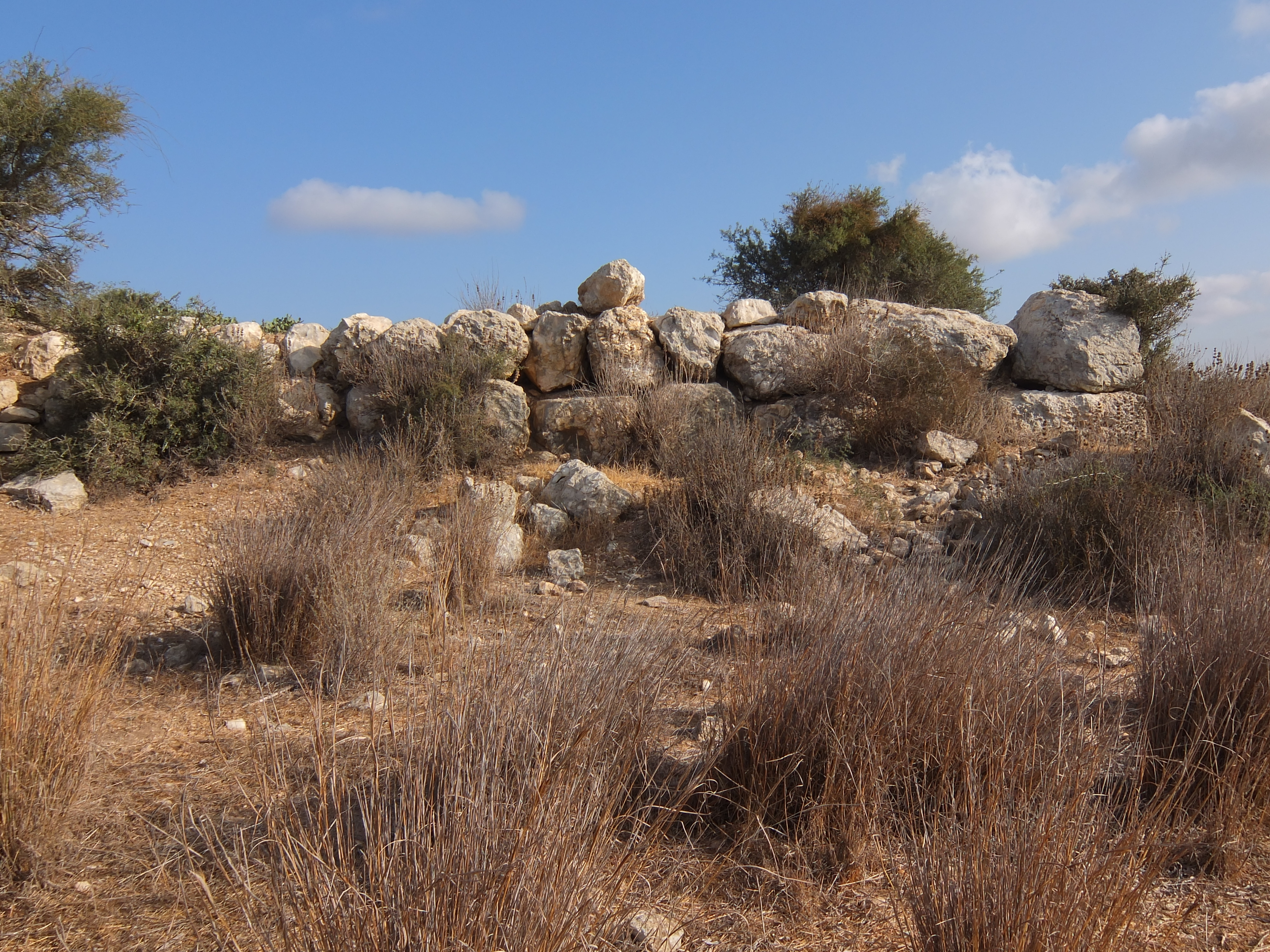
Wall at Khirbat Rubba (Rebbo)

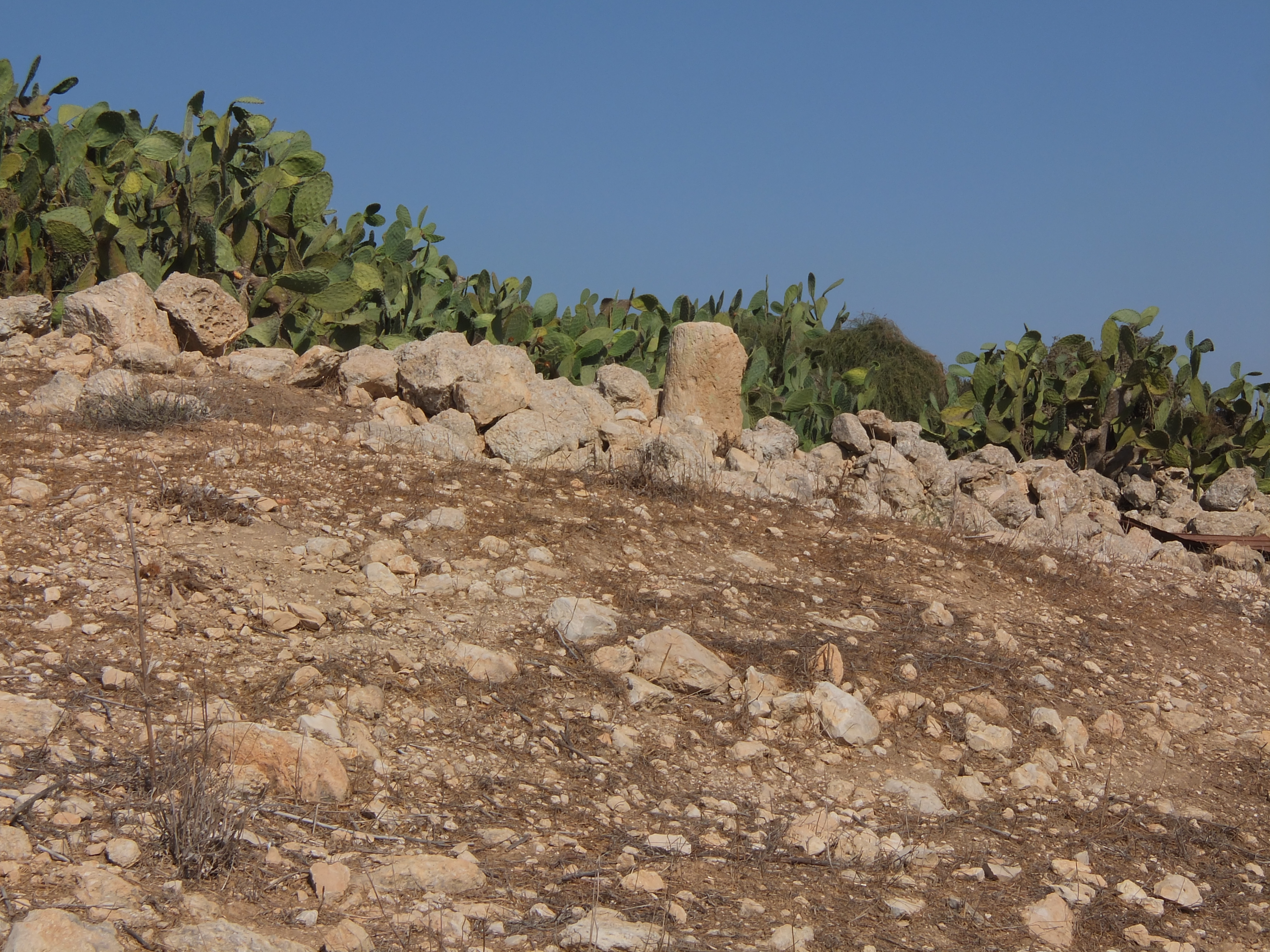
Stone structures at Rebbo

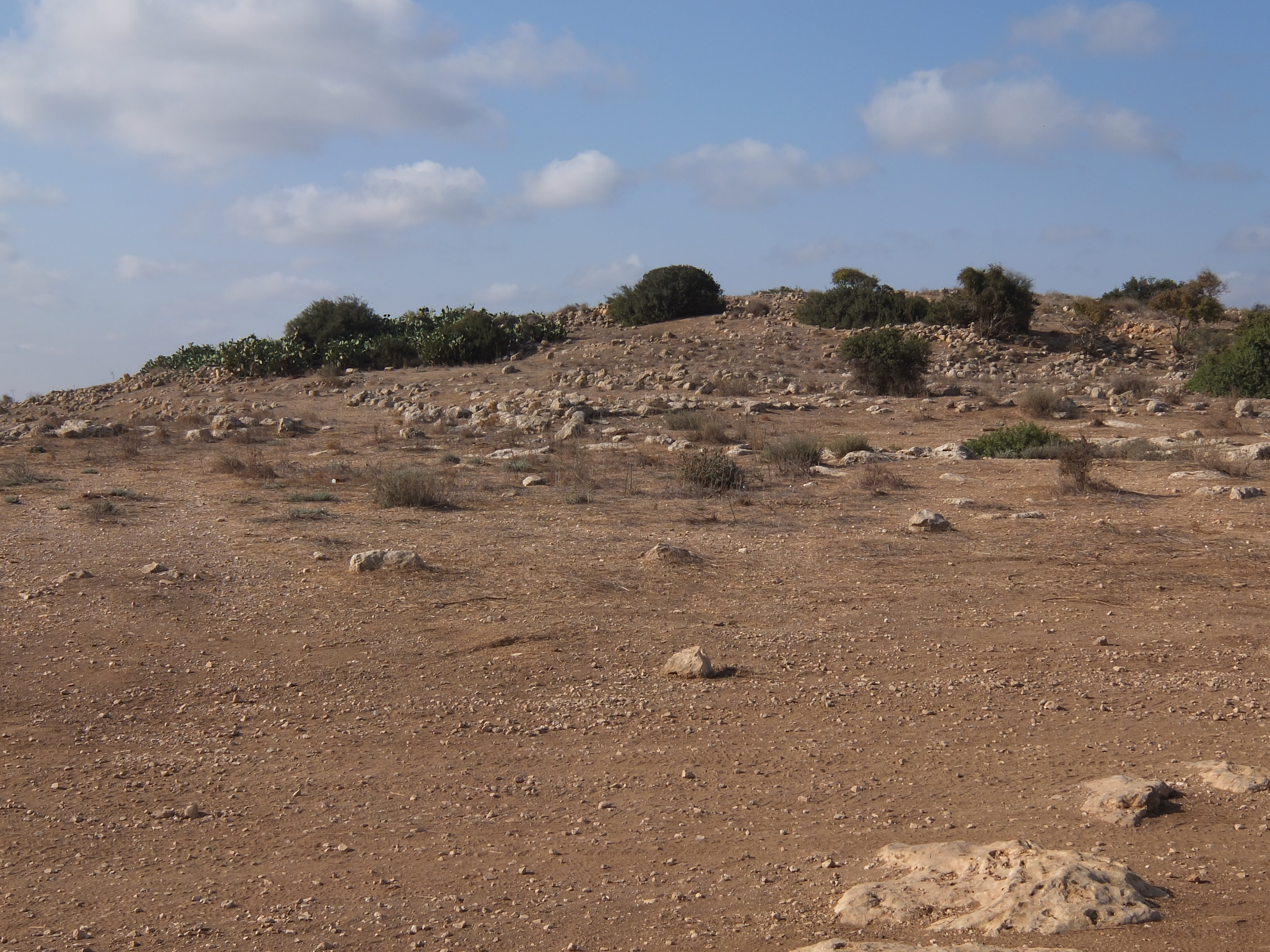
Dell on lower east side of Horvat Rebbo/Khurbet Rubba

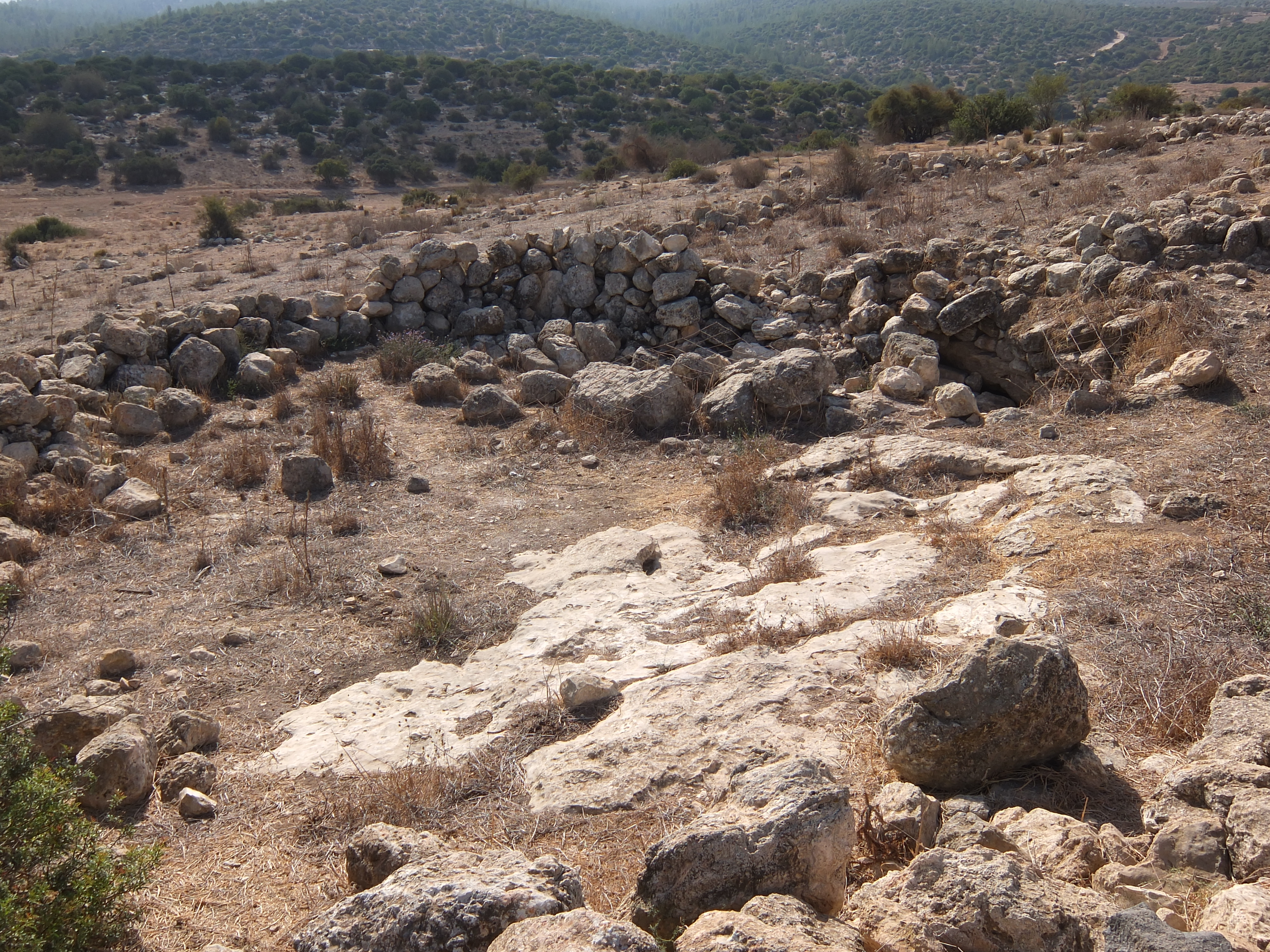
Ruins at Khirbat Rubba

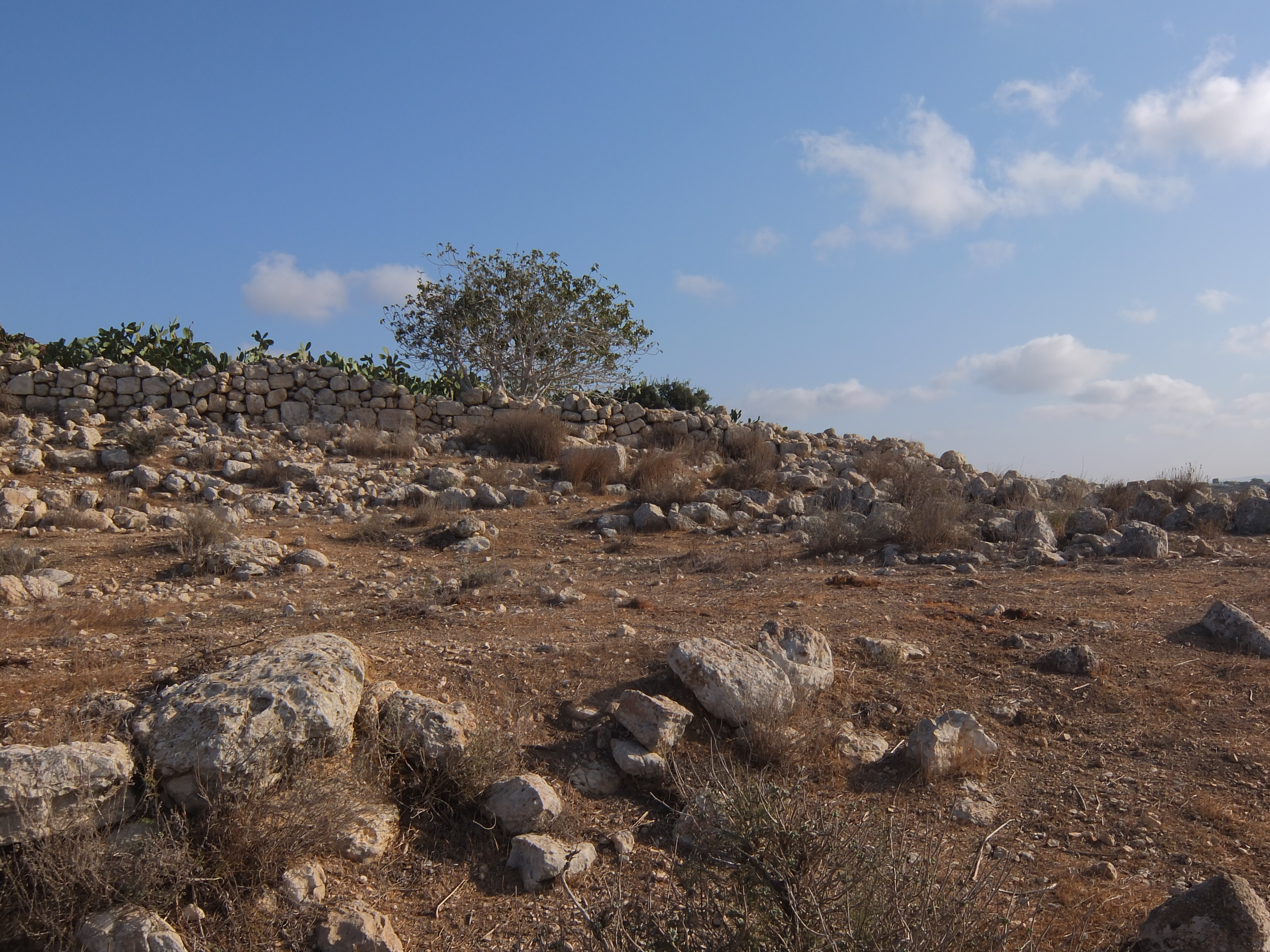
General view of Horvat Rebbo/Khurbet Rubba

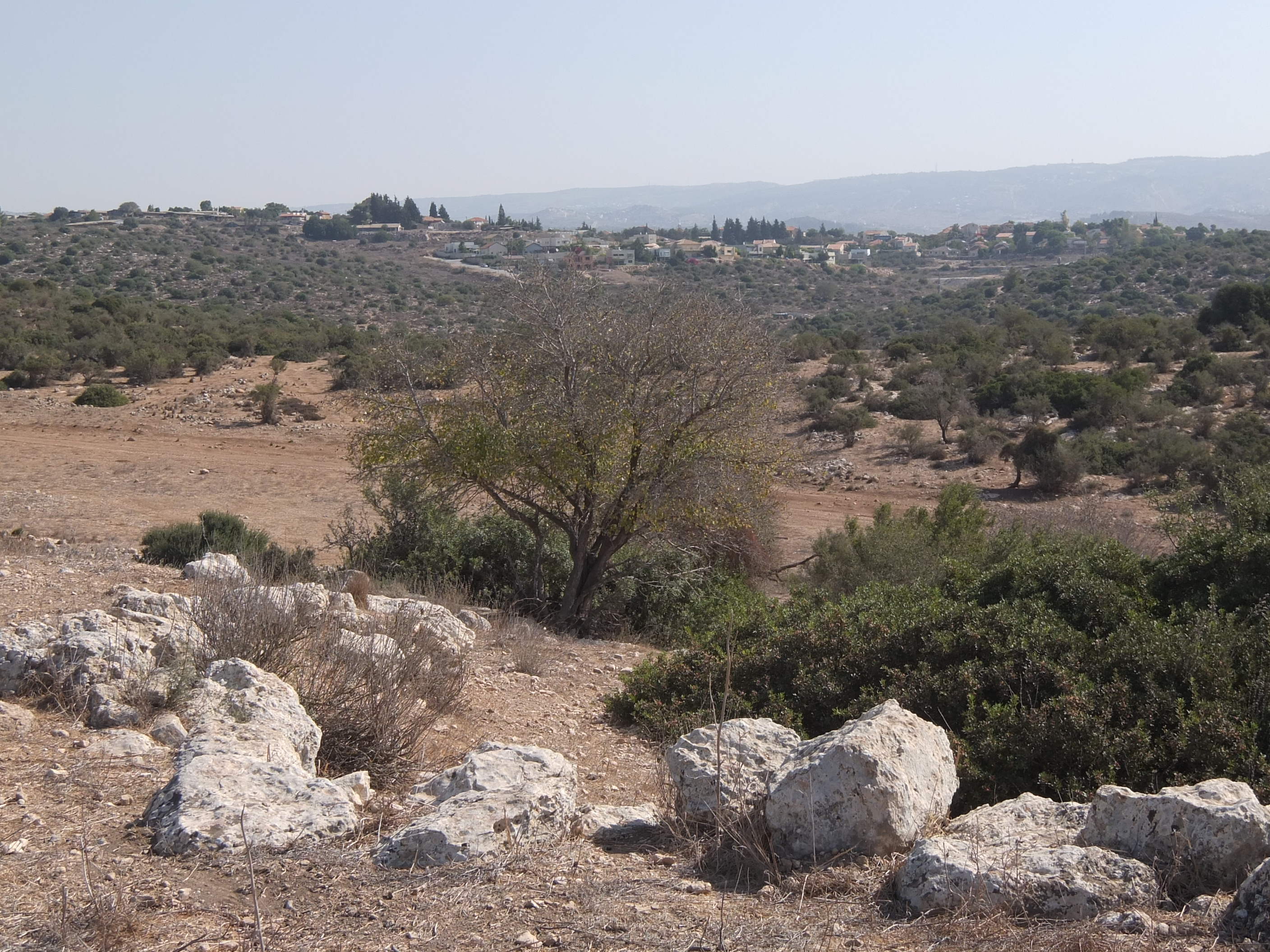
Moshav Aderet seen in the distance from Horvat Rebbo/Khurbet RubbaKhurbet Rubba

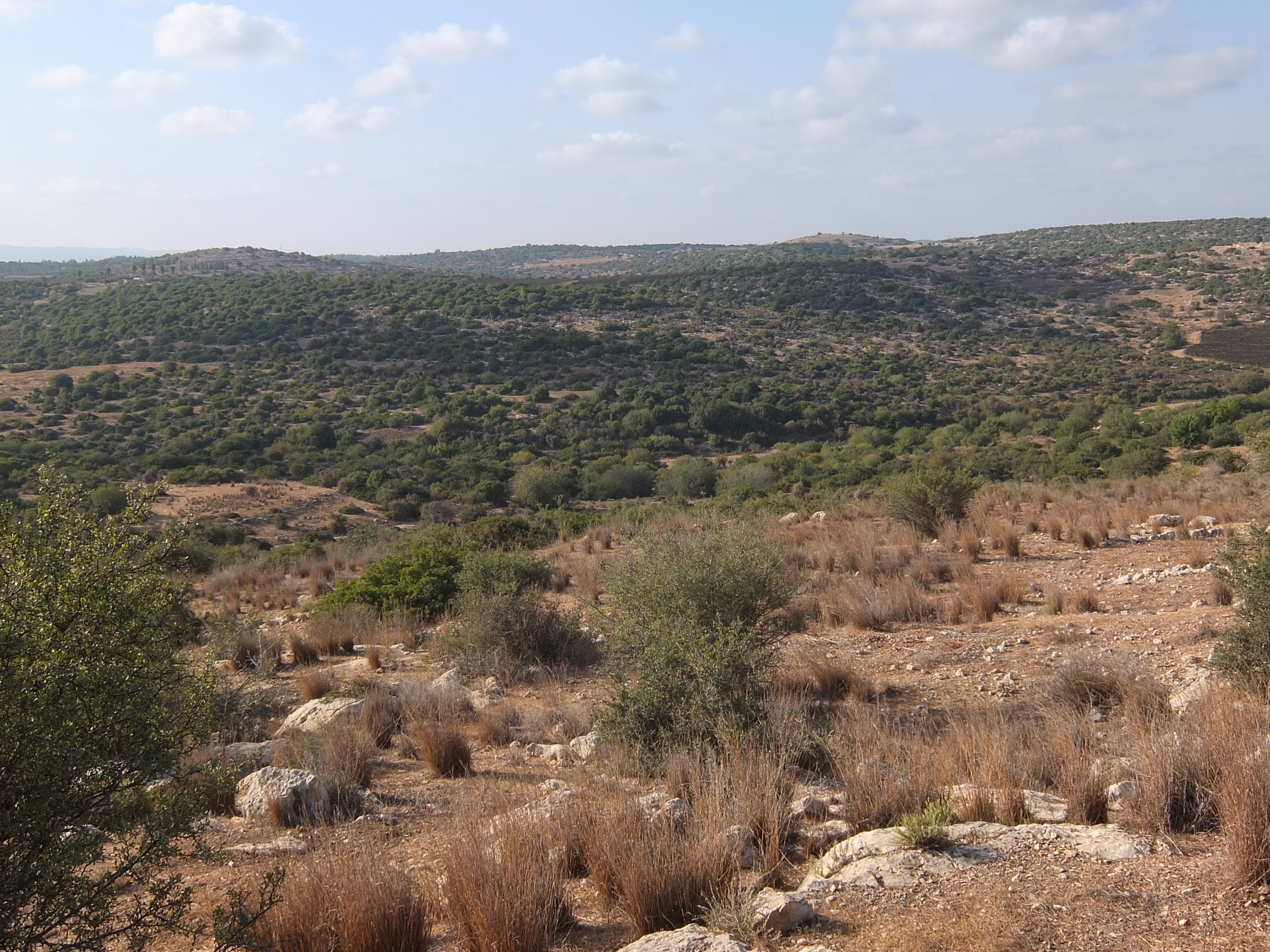
General view looking south of Rebbo

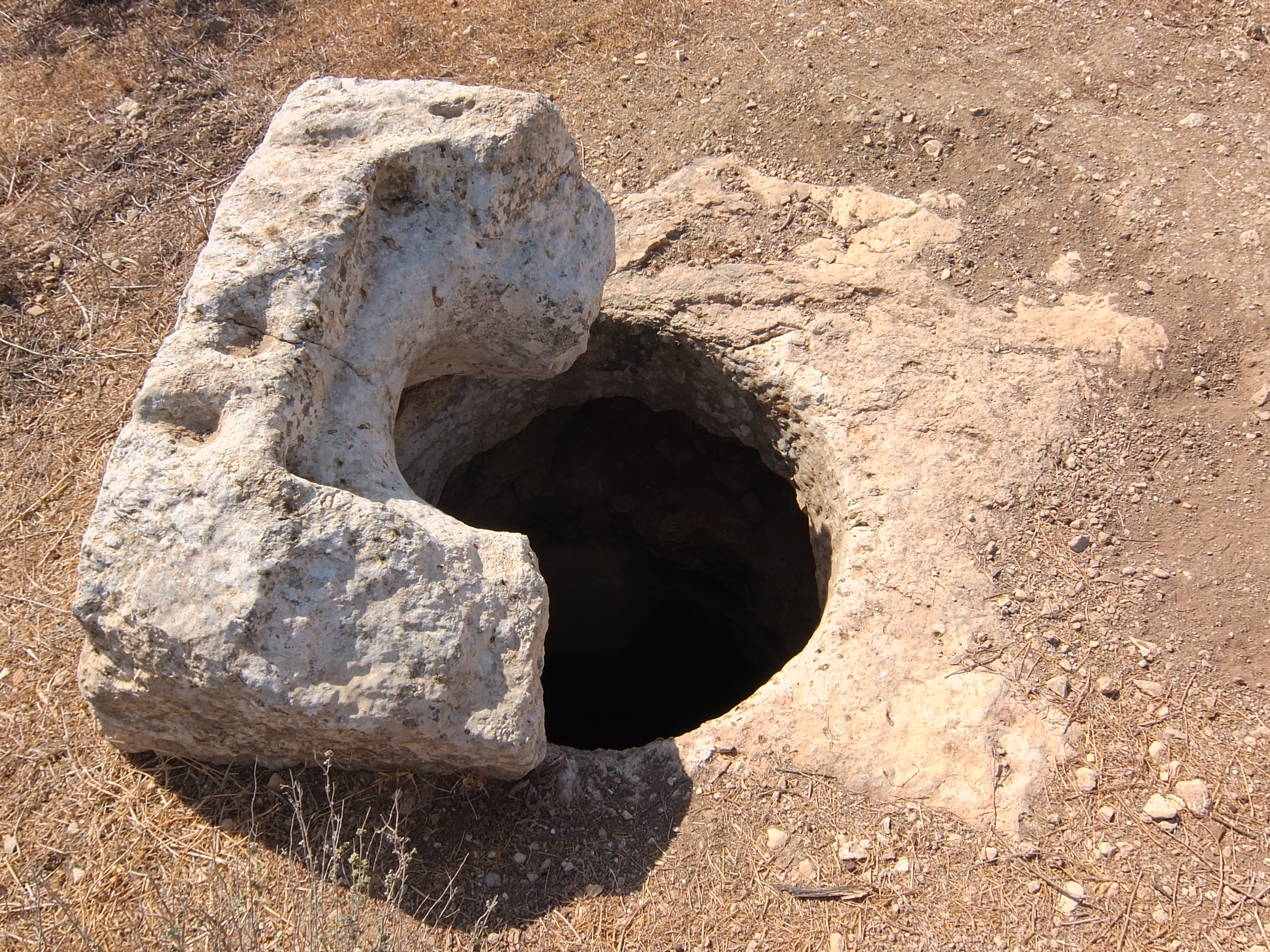
Broken mouth of well at Rebbo

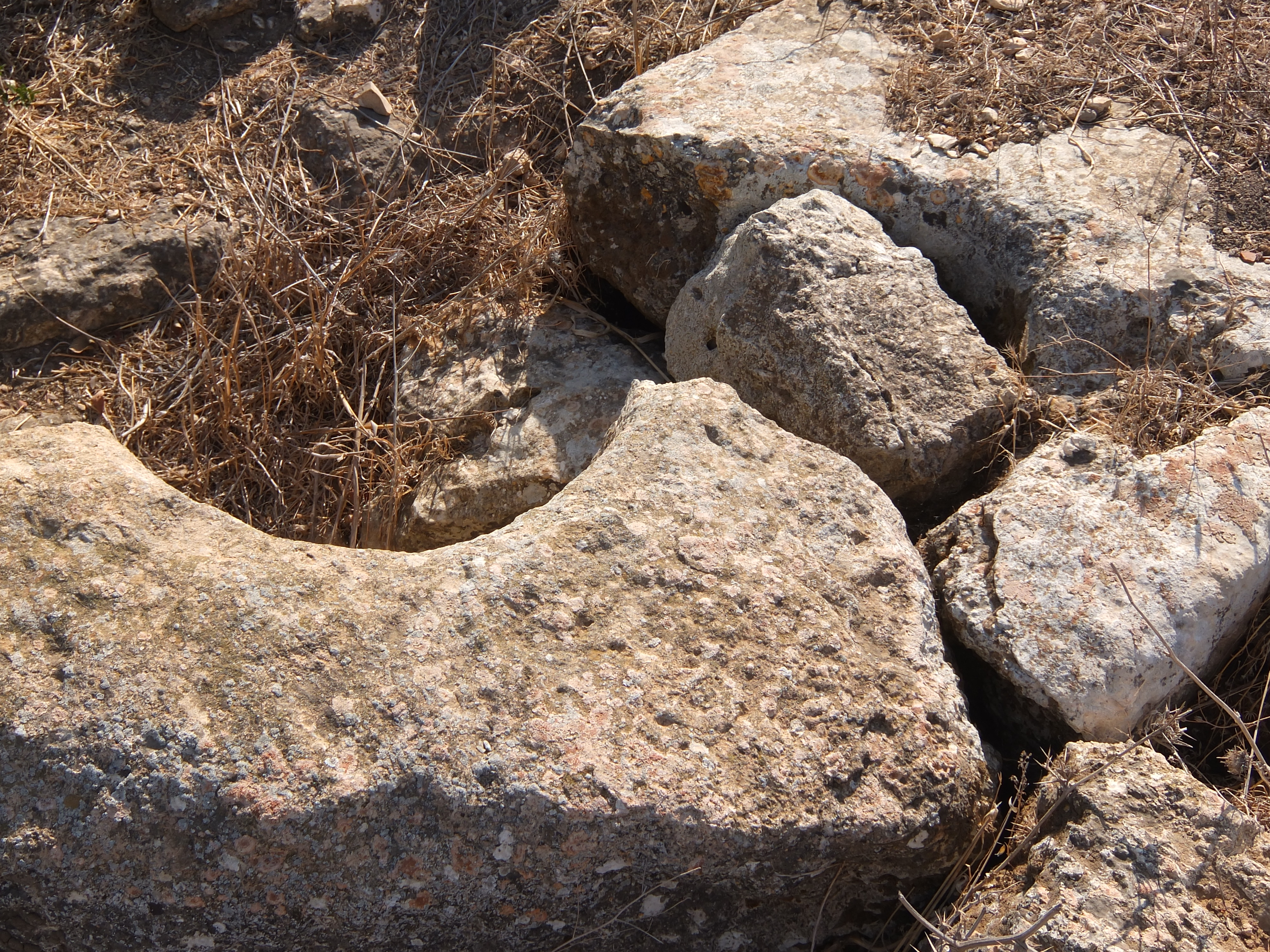
Broken mouth of well, now sealed

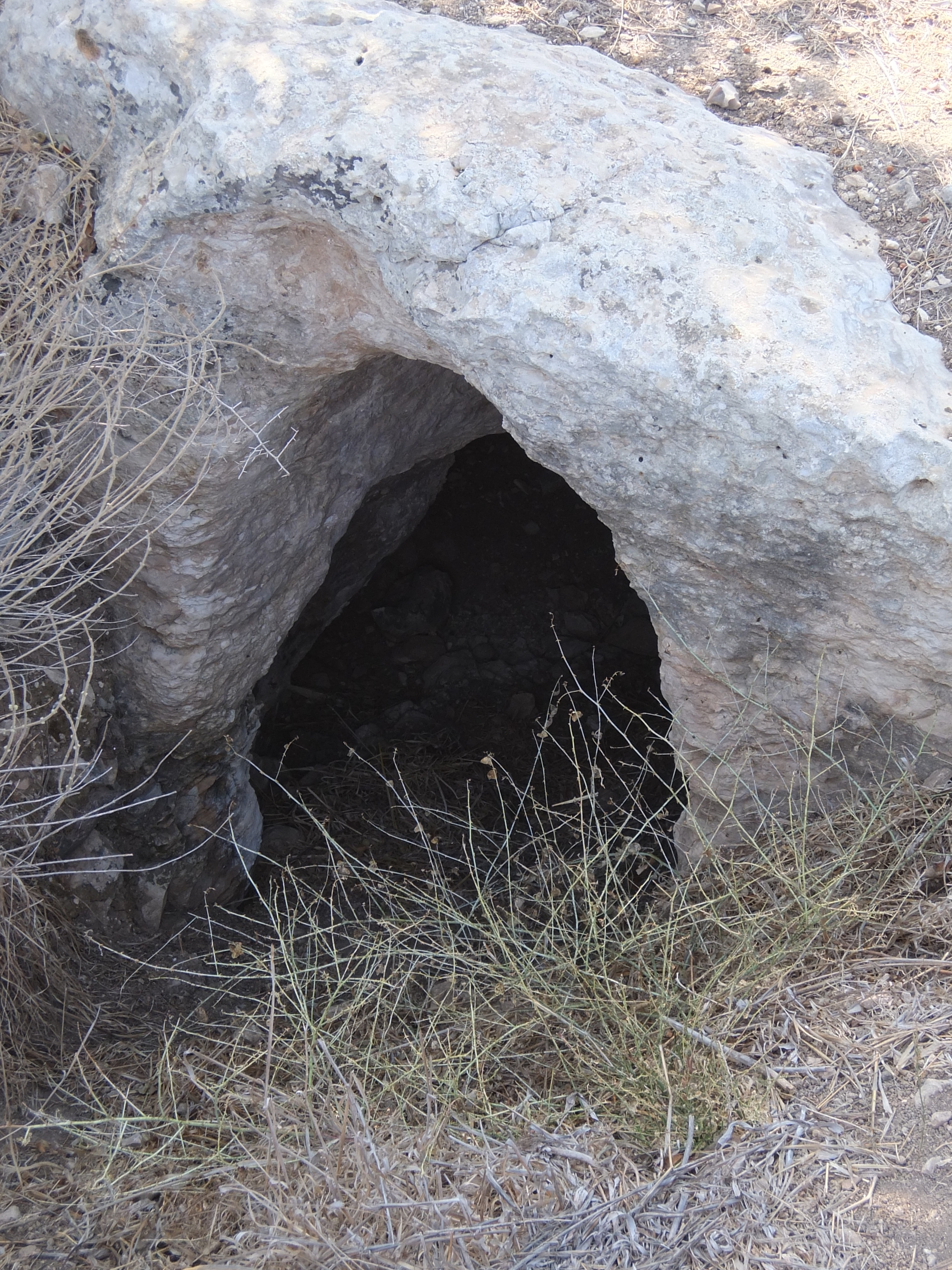
Entrance to cave

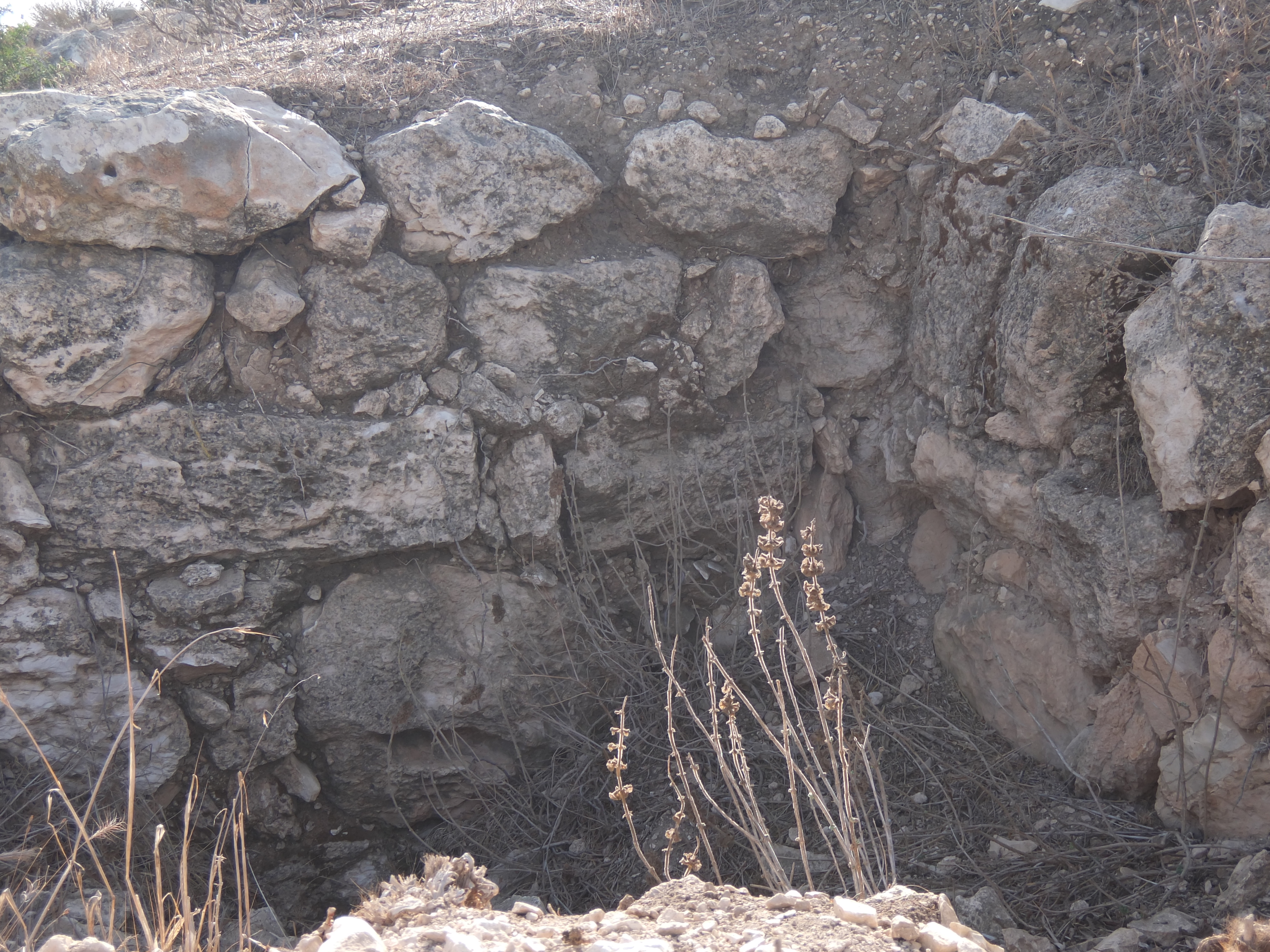
Remnant of old wall at Khirbat Rubba

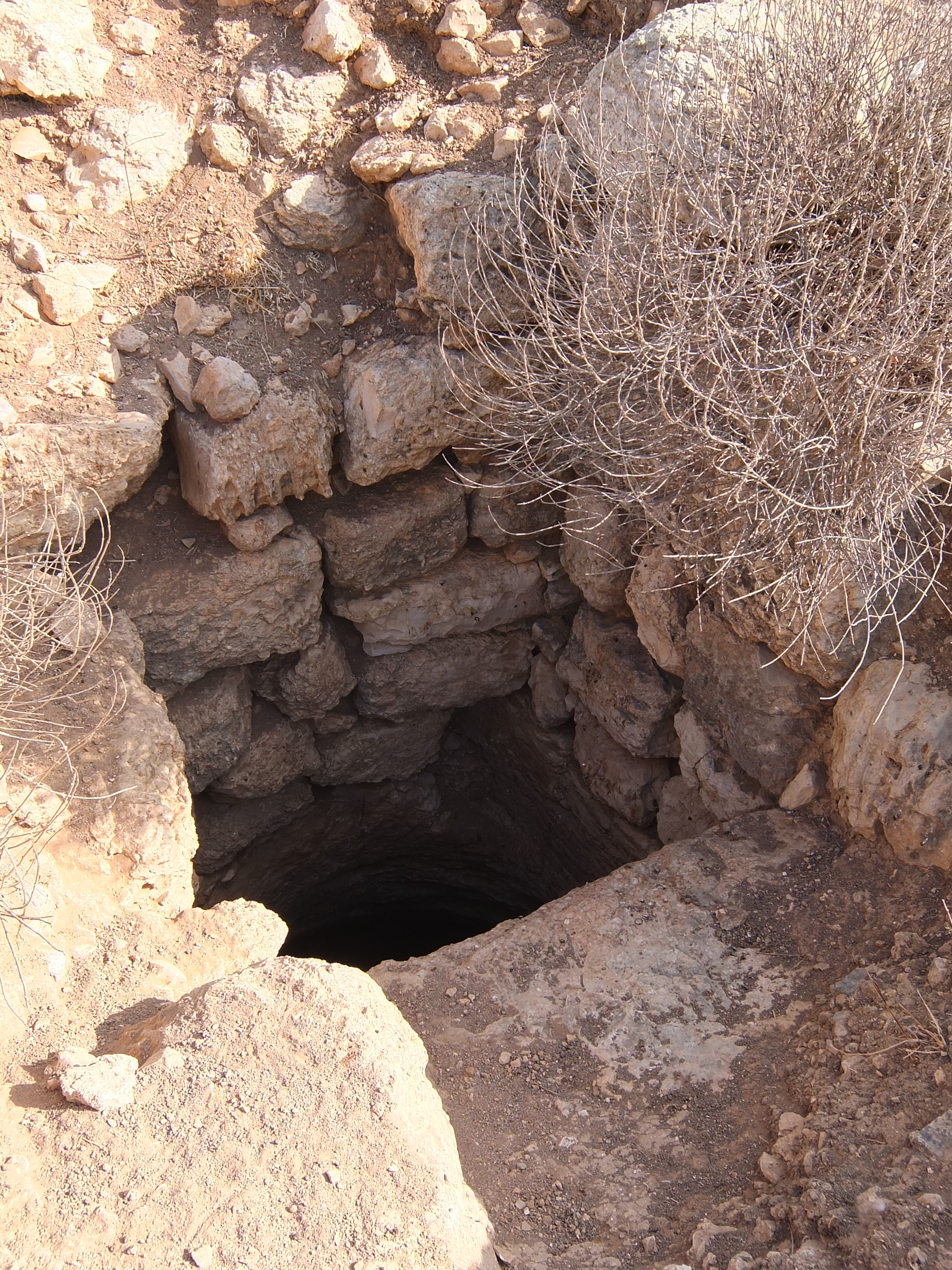
Pit lined with hewn stones at Rebbo

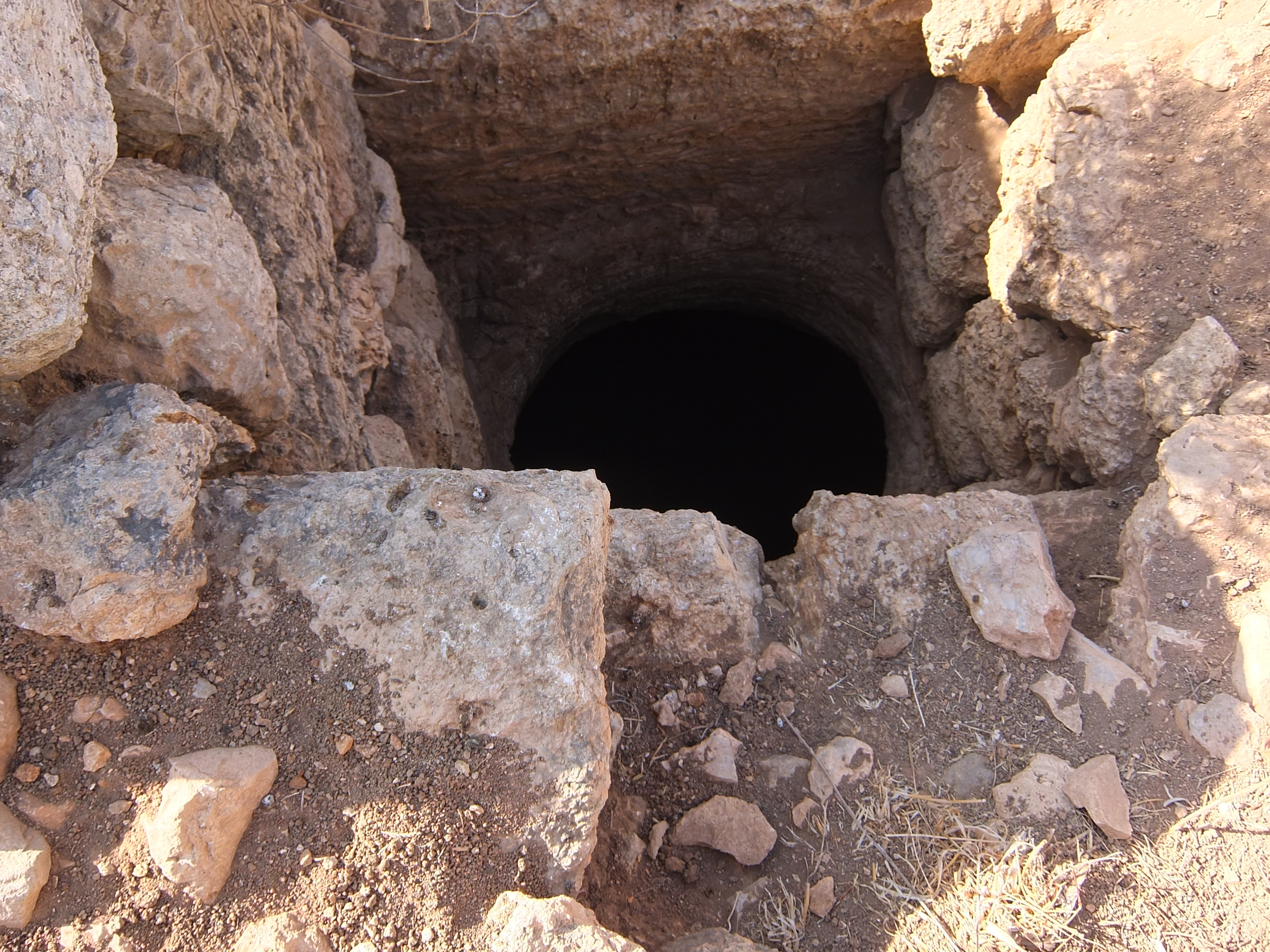
Gaping hole of pit (cavern) at Rebbo

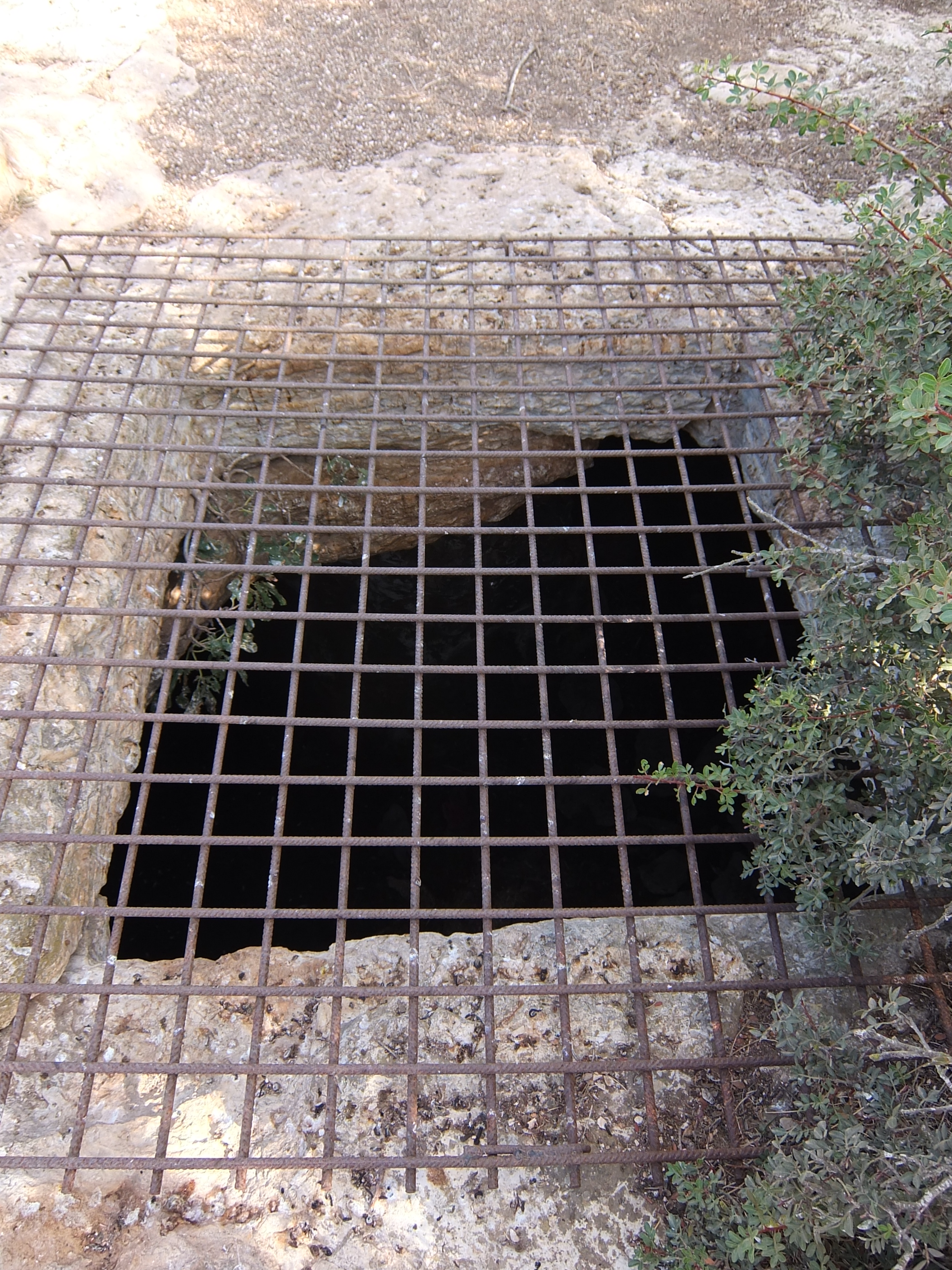
Grating covering pit at Rebbo

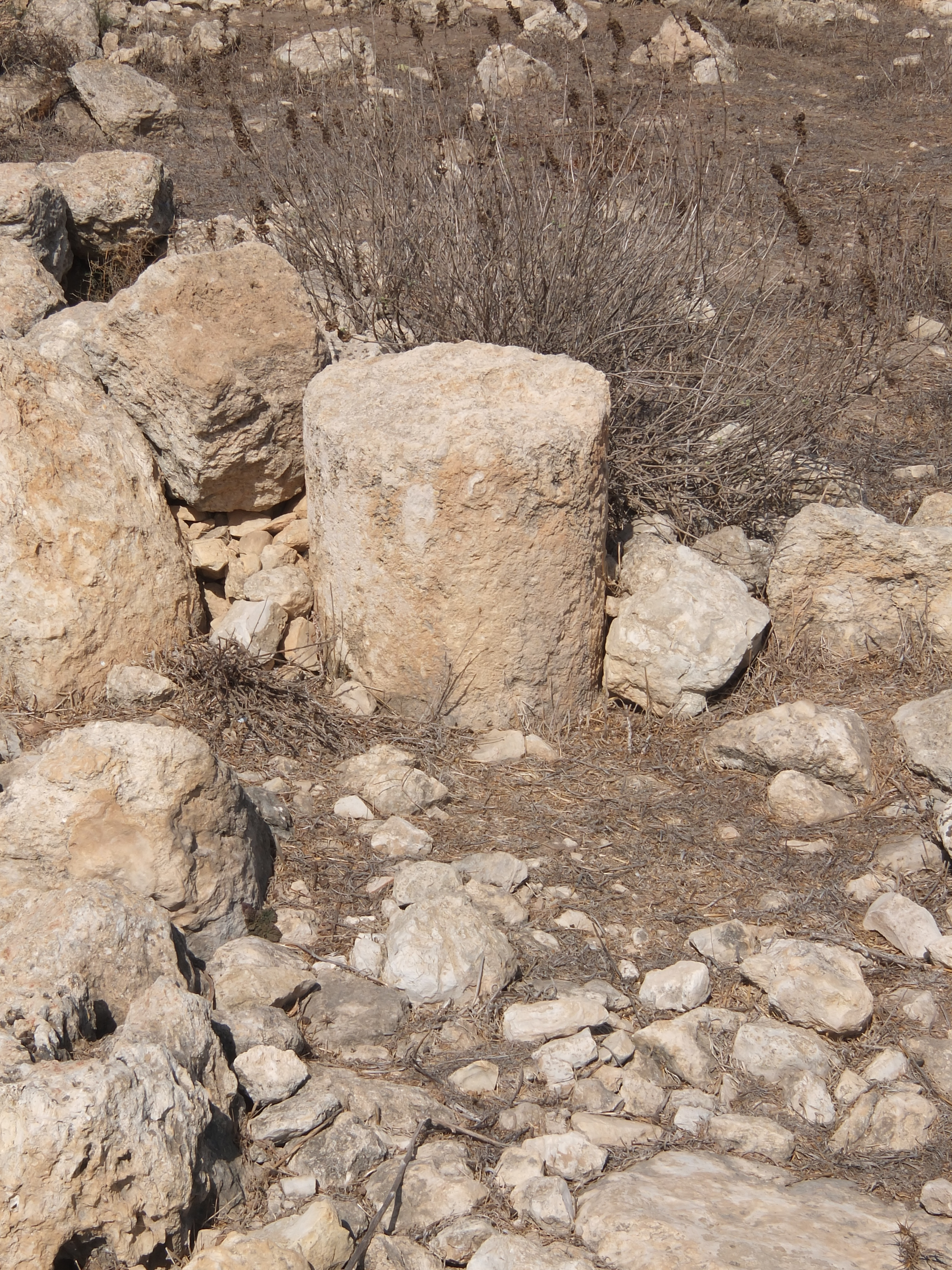
Column stump at Rebbo

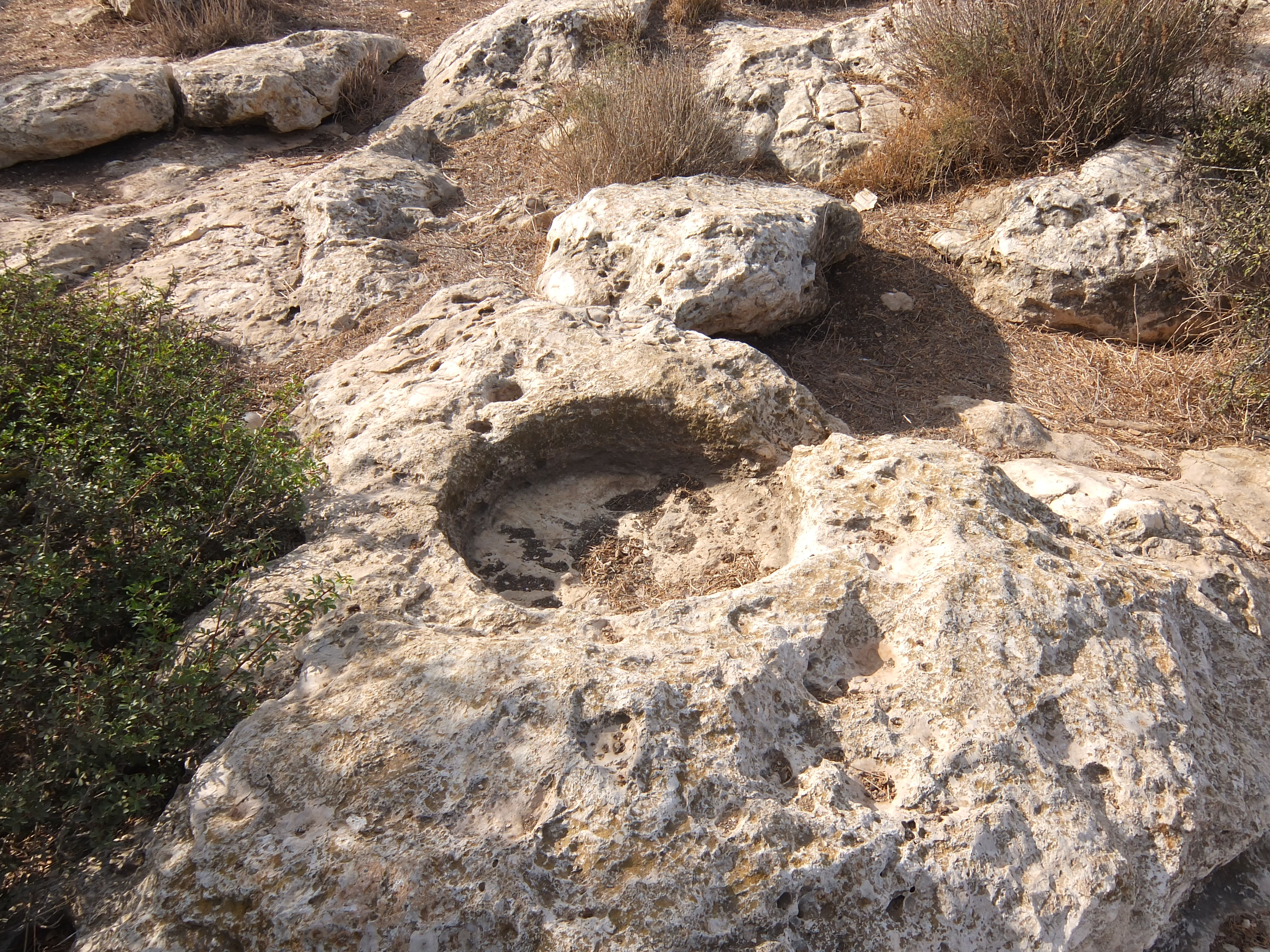
Wine press carved in rock at Rebbo

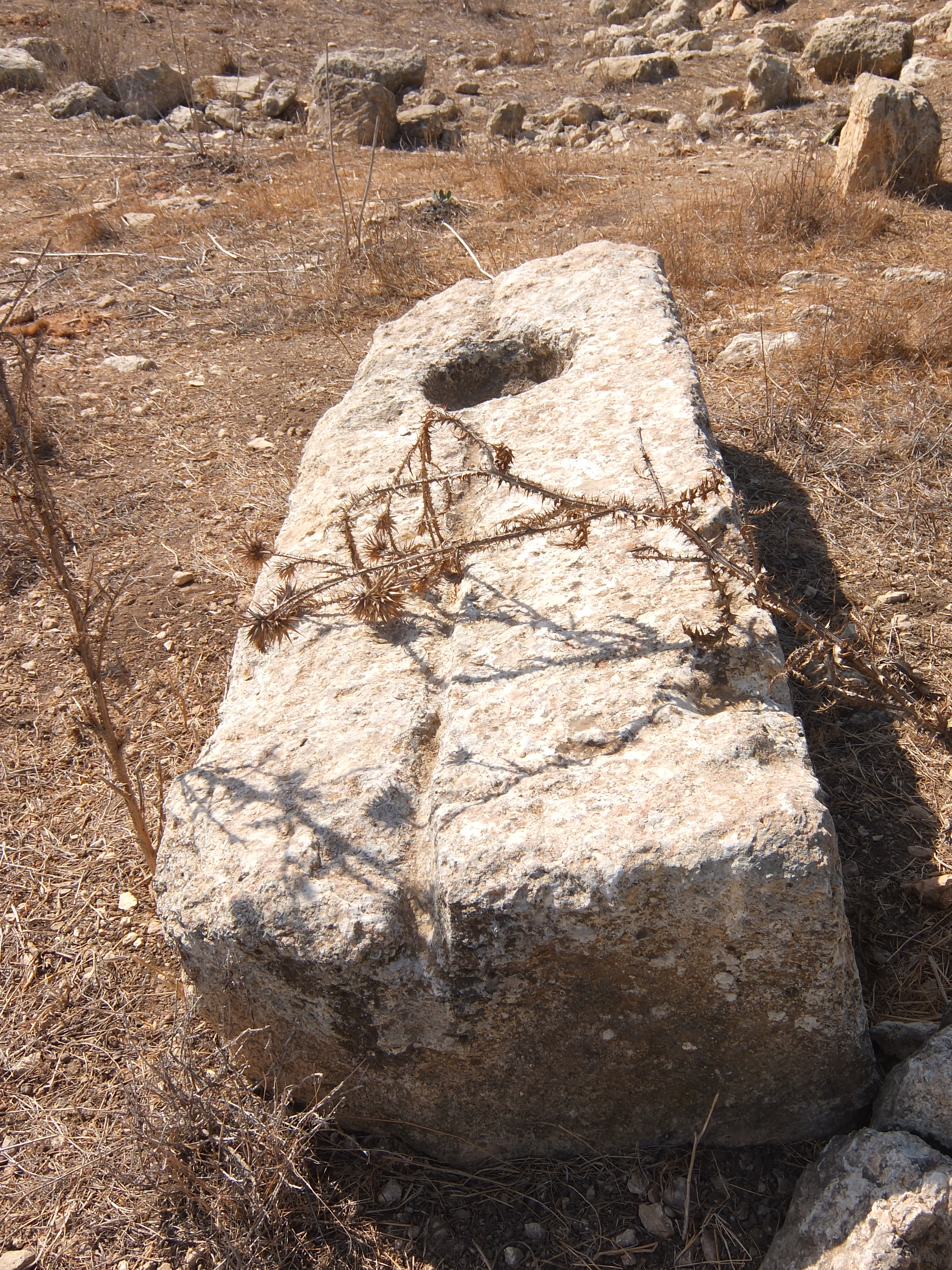
Large slab of stone (wine press?) at Rebbo

== Bibliography ==
- Conder, C.R.; Kitchener, H.H. (1883). The Survey of Western Palestine: Memoirs of the Topography, Orography, Hydrography, and Archaeology. Vol. 3. London: Committee of the Palestine Exploration Fund.
- Elitzur, Yoel [in Hebrew] (2004). Ancient Place Names in the Holy Land – Preservation and History. Hebrew University, Magnes Press. ISBN 1-57506-071-X.
- Guérin, V. (1869). Description Géographique Historique et Archéologique de la Palestine (in French). Vol. 1: Judée, pt. 3. Paris: L'Imprimerie nationale.
- Notley, R.S.; Safrai, Z. (2005). Eusebius, Onomasticon – The Place Names of Divine Scripture. Leiden: Brill. ISBN 0-391-04217-3.
- Palmer, E.H. (1881). The Survey of Western Palestine: Arabic and English Name Lists Collected During the Survey by Lieutenants Conder and Kitchener, R. E. Transliterated and Explained by E.H. Palmer. Committee of the Palestine Exploration Fund.
- Press, I., ed. (1955), "רבה", A Topographical-Historical Encyclopaedia of Palestine, vol. 4, Jerusalem: Rubin Mass, p. 851
- Rainey, A.F. (1983). "The Biblical Shephelah of Judah". Bulletin of the American Schools of Oriental Research. 251 (251). The University of Chicago Press on behalf of The American Schools of Oriental Research: 1–22. doi:10.2307/1356823. JSTOR 1356823.
- Saarisalo, Aapeli (1931). "Topographical Researches in the Shephelah". The Journal of the Palestine Oriental Society. XI.
- Trumper, Victor L. (1918). Historical Sites in Central Palestine (part 1). Cairo: Nile Mission Press.
