= Horvat Midras =

Archaeological site in Israel

- חורבת מדרס (Hebrew); Khirbet Drūsye (Arabic)
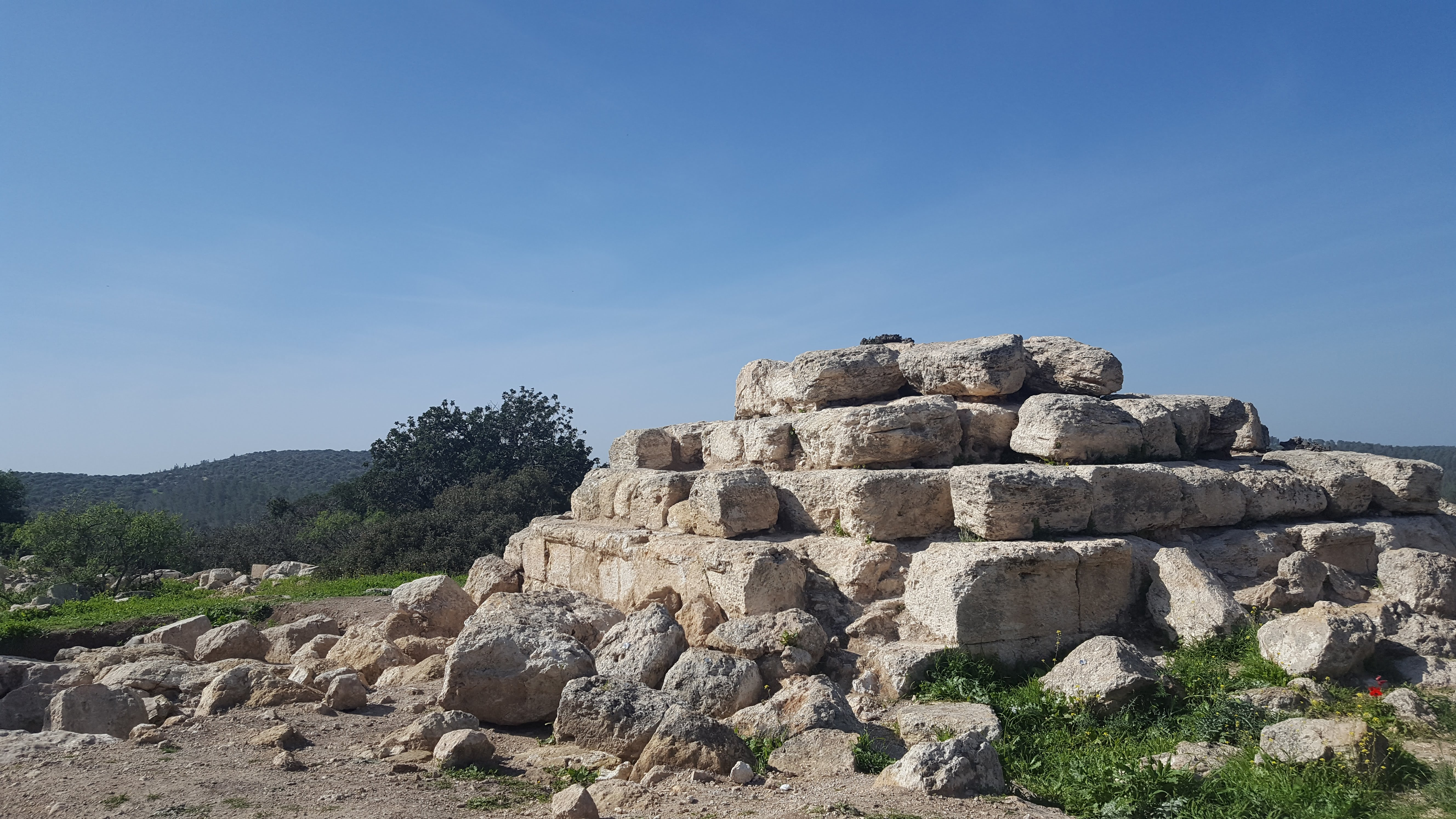
- Pyramidal tomb at Horvat Midras

- Location within Israel
- 31°39′18″N 34°56′15″E
- Type: settlement
- Periods: Earliest remains: Late Iron Age / Persian period; Ancient settlement: Hellenistic and Early Roman periods (largest extent); Later phases: Byzantine and Early Islamic period; Late agricultural activity: Mamluk and Ottoman periods
- Cultures: Second Temple Judaism, Byzantine culture, Islamic culture
- Location: Adullam Grove Nature Reserve, Israel
- Region: Judaean Foothills
- Palestine grid: 193/618

Site notes
- Height: 333 m (1,093 ft)
- Condition: In ruins
- Public access: Yes

Horvat Midras (Hebrew: חורבת מדרס), or Khirbet Drūsye in Arabic, is an archaeological site located in the central Judaean Lowlands, in modern-day Israel. It contains the remains of an ancient settlement situated on the slopes of a spur near an ancient road that once connected Jerusalem with the southern coastal plain. Today, the site lies within the Adullam Nature Reserve.

Continuous occupation at Horvat Midras is attested from the Hellenistic period. Following the Hasmonean conquest of Idumaea in the late 2nd century BCE, the site was briefly abandoned. It was re-established in the 1st century BCE and grew to become one of the largest and most affluent rural settlements in the Judaean Lowlands during the Second Temple period. The site, home to a Jewish population, remained inhabited through the First Jewish Revolt (66–70 CE) and up to the Bar Kokhba Revolt (132–136 CE). Later in the same century, a cultic complex was established at the site. During the Byzantine period, Horvat Midras was home to a small Christian village, with an elaborate church.

Following the Muslim conquest in the early 7th century, the church remained in use, but its crosses were intentionally plastered over, and access routes were altered to avoid the sanctuary. The church collapsed during the 749 earthquake, after which a rural settlement began to develop in the late 8th or 9th century. After several centuries of abandonment, the site was reoccupied in the Ayyubid and Mamluk periods (13th to 16th centuries) and functioned as a small agricultural village. In the early Ottoman period, it declined, becoming a seasonal settlement, with the ancient remains reused for herding and small-scale farming.

One of the most notable finds at Horvat Midras is a monumental family tomb from the late Second Temple period, consisting of a podium topped by a stepped pyramid. Unique in the rural landscape of ancient Judea, it represents a rare example of a rural "display tomb"—a status symbol likely commissioned by a wealthy family, possibly one whose influence rose through ties with the Herodian dynasty. Other major finds include hiding complexes, rock-cut tombs, columbaria (structures intended to house pigeons), mikvehs (Jewish ritual baths), and the elaborate Byzantine church with well-preserved mosaics.

== Location ==
Horvat Midras is located in the central Shephelah on a slope at an elevation of 333 metres. The site lies in a fertile area, about 0.8 kilometers east of the ancient road that once linked Gaza on the coastal plain with Jerusalem in the Judaean Mountains, passing through Ashkelon and Beit Guvrin—a route now roughly followed by modern Highway 38. The stream Nahal Hakhlil is located immediately to the north. Today, the site is situated within the Adullam Grove Nature Reserve. The nearest modern settlement is moshav Tzafririm, with kibbutz Beit Guvrin located about 6 kilometres to the southwest.

== Name ==
In earlier surveys, notably the PEF Survey of Palestine and the 1930s Survey of Palestine, the site was referred to as Druseh or Durusiya.

Scholars associate the site with Drusias, a place mentioned in Ptolemy's Geography, a treatise on cartography dating from the 2nd century CE. This identification was first proposed by French scholar Félix-Marie Abel in 1938 and was later developed by archaeologists Boaz Zissu and Amos Kloner. Zissu and Kloner proposed that the name may have been given under Herod the Great (r. 37 to 4 BCE), whose family originated from Idumaea (southern Judaea), suggesting it could have been named in honor of Drusus, the adopted son of Emperor Augustus. This interpretation fits Herod's known habit of dedicating buildings and places to members of Augustus's family. If correct, it would not be the only site he named after Drusus: another example is the "Drousion" tower in Caesarea, a city that Herod himself named in honor of Augustus.

Archaeologist Guy D. Stiebel has raised doubts about this theory, noting that the site is not mentioned by Josephus—a key source for the Herodian period—and lacks archaeological evidence of Herodian construction. Instead, he proposes that Drousia derives from the Greek word δρῦς, meaning oak tree, combined with the suffix –ιάς, commonly used in place names. He links the name to the oak-rich environment of the Judaean Lowlands and draws parallels with other ancient settlements named after natural features.

It has been suggested that Horvat Midras was the hometown of Ben Drusai, a figure mentioned in the Talmud, (Note: Ben Drusai is mentioned in both the Babylonian and Jerusalem Talmuds in the context of Shabbat laws; the term "כמאכל בן דרוסאי" refers to a dish cooked to the minimal degree.) with his name derived from this location. However, this identification is disputed, and other explanations for the origin of his name have also been proposed.

== Archaeology ==
Relevant archeological periods
Ancient Near East
- Iron Age: 1200–587 BCE
- Persian period: 587–332 BCE

Classical antiquity
- Hellenistic/Hasmonean: 332–63 BCE
- Herodian/Early and Middle Roman: 63 BCE–136 CE

Late Antiquity
- Late Roman: 136–324
- Byzantine: 324–636

Middle Ages
- Early Islamic: 636–1099
- Ayyubid: 1187–1250
- Mamluk: 1260–1517

Modern Period
- Ottoman: 1516–1917

=== Early activities ===
Settlement at Horvat Midras likely began in the Late Iron Age or Persian period (6th to 4th centuries BCE), though only pottery sherds have been securely attributed to these early phases. More definitive evidence of occupation appears from the early Hellenistic period through the Hasmonean conquest of Idumaea in the late 2nd century BCE, after which the site was abandoned.

=== Early Roman period ===
Horvat Midras was re-established during the Early Roman period, likely under Herod (ruled 37 to 4 BCE). Archaeological evidence indicates a Jewish population. At this time, the settlement appears to have reached its greatest size, covering about 30 acres, suggesting that it developed into one of the largest and most prosperous villages in the Judaean Lowlands. The place remained occupied from the First Jewish Revolt (66–73 CE) until its destruction during the Bar Kokhba revolt (132–136 CE), and may have been among the 985 settlements reportedly destroyed during the latter, as recorded by Cassius Dio.

==== Stepped pyramid ====
A notable feature from the Early Roman period at Horvat Midras is a monumental funerary structure (nefesh) topped with a stepped stone pyramid, situated at the summit of the hill. (Note: The dating is based on material found on the leveled bedrock beside the podium's foundation, sealed beneath collapse debris and hardened chalk. The assemblage included a few pottery sherds dating to the 1st or early 2nd century CE, prior to the Bar Kokhba Revolt, and two coins: one from Hasmonean king Alexander Jannaeus (103–76 BCE), still in circulation in the 1st century CE, and another minted in 18–19 CE by the Roman prefect Valerius Gratus.) It is considered unique in the countryside of ancient Judea, and represents a rare example of a rural "display tomb"—a burial monument designed not only for commemoration but also for visibility and public recognition. Such features are more typically found in urban contexts, most notably in Jerusalem during the late Second Temple period. (Note: The earliest known display tomb in Judea is the Hasmonean family tomb at Modi'in, built by Simon Thassi around 143 BCE, likely influenced by monumental mausolea in Asia Minor. Later examples include the Tomb of Zechariah and the Tomb of Absalom in Jerusalem.) The structure consists of a square podium measuring 10 by 10 meters, constructed from dressed ashlar blocks and founded directly on bedrock. The pyramid that crowns the podium originally brought the total height of the monument to approximately seven meters. Its elevated position—visible from all directions, including up to 6.25 km away and from the nearby road—along with its imposing design, suggests it served as a prominent status symbol for the wealthy family buried nearby, possibly an elite household whose influence grew through connections with the Herodian dynasty.

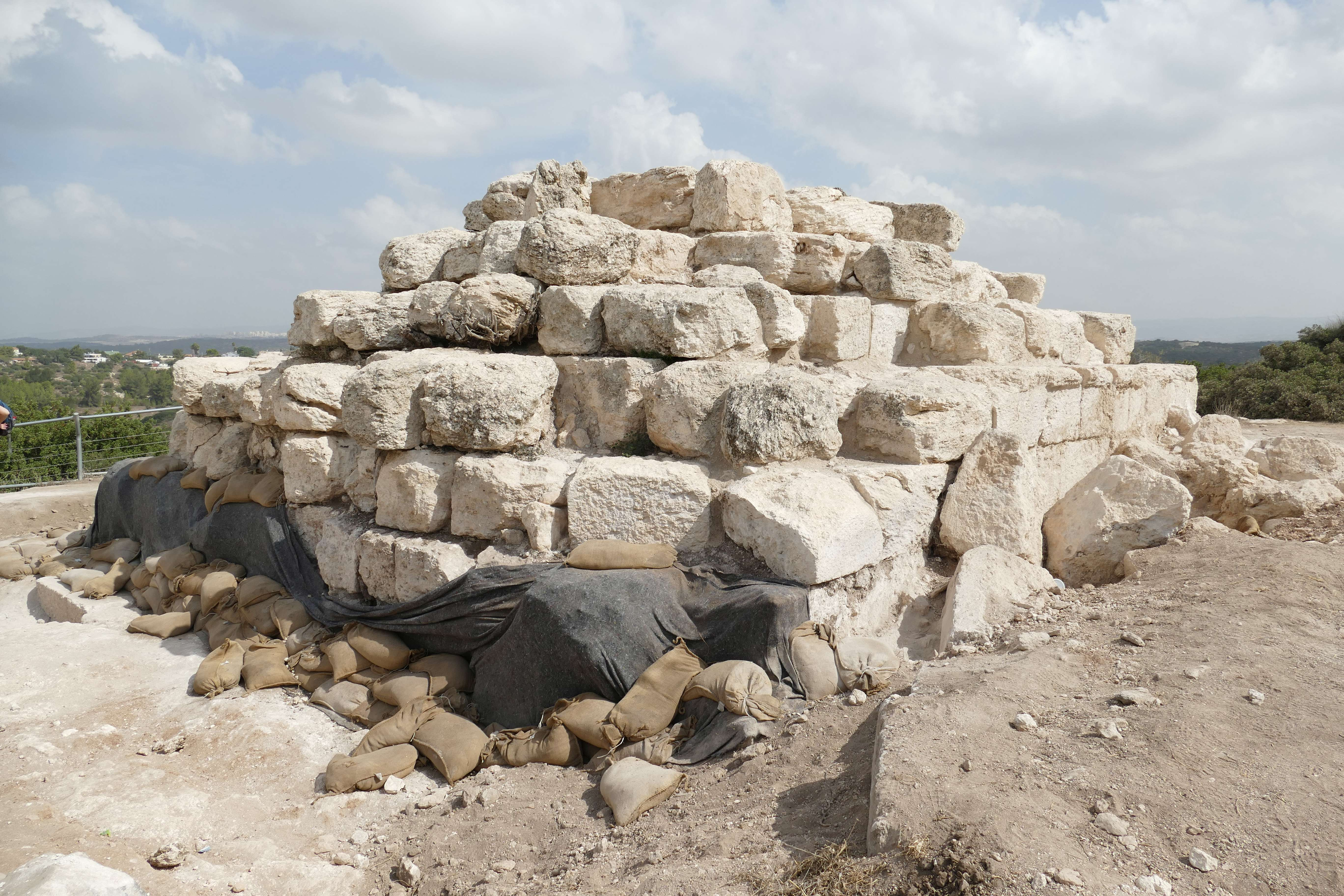
The ruins of a stepped pyramid, part of a monumental family tomb from the late Second Temple period

==== Hiding complexes ====
Fifty-six rock-cut underground chambers and hiding complexes were discovered at Horvat Midras, of which four were extensively investigated. These resemble the hundreds of similar systems found beneath Jewish settlements in the Judaean Lowlands. One of the systems, referred to as System #6, links three ancient pits—two of which served as water cisterns—through a network of crawlspaces. Another, System #20, stretches over 100 meters; it contains a columbarium (a chamber with niches intended to house pigeons), two storerooms, and two mikva'ot (Jewish ritual baths), all interconnected by tunnels and small hiding chambers. One of these mikva'ot was likely intended for residents of an overlying building, and it was sealed off when the hiding tunnels were later cut through its walls. Pottery fragments, including storage jars, cooking pots, a stone cup handle, a ridged oil lamp, and coins—among them a First Jewish Revolt coin (second-year prutah from 67/68 CE) and coins from the reign of Emperor Domitian (r. 81–96 CE)—date the usage of these spaces to the 1st and early 2nd centuries CE.

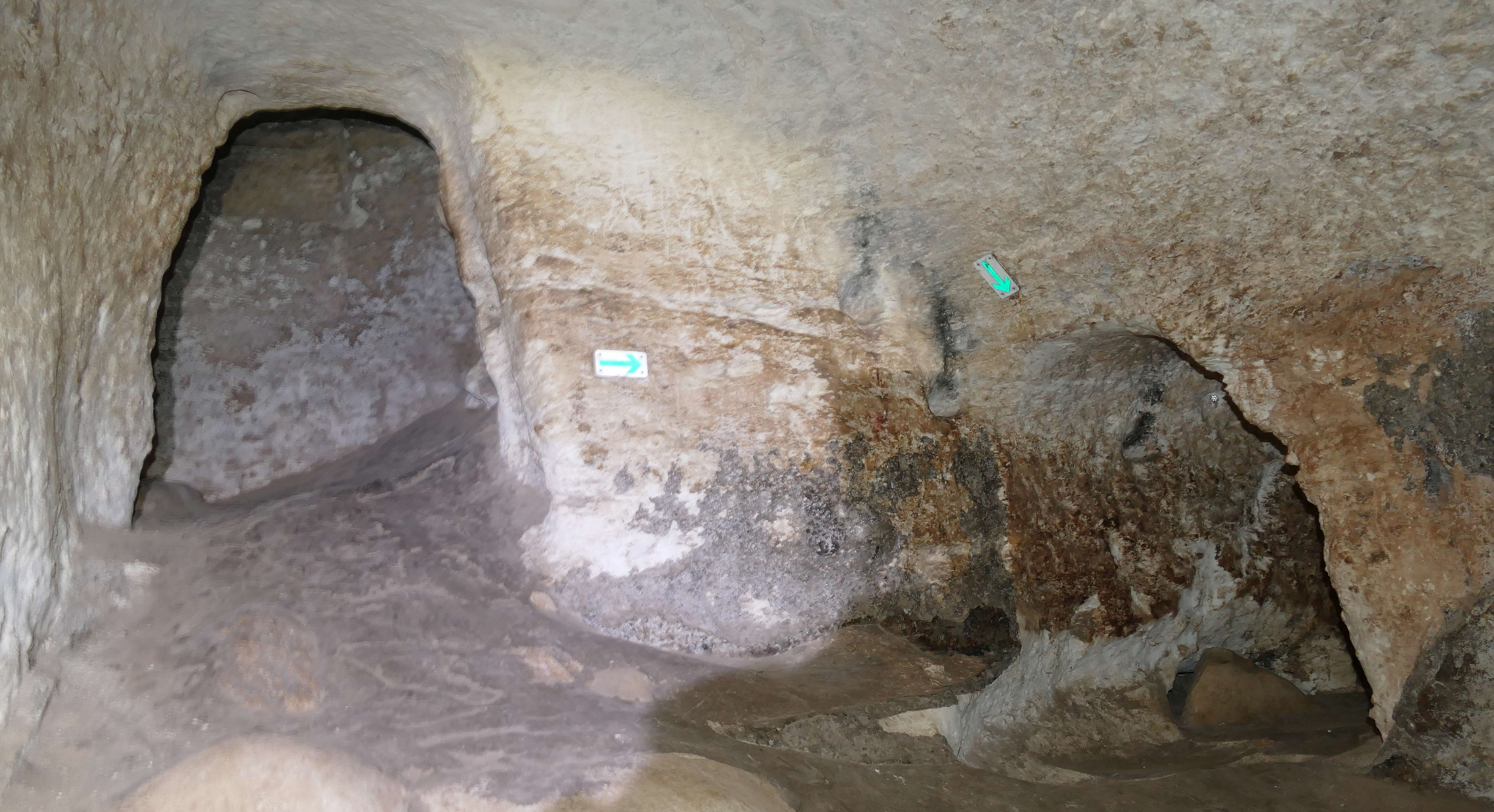
Mikveh (Jewish ritual bath); the original entrance is on the left, with the breach from the hiding tunnel visible on the right

System #30 consists of a series of ancient water cisterns, later adapted as hiding places. It features a storage chamber supported by two pillars and two small rooms, all accessed via a sloped tunnel. System #31 links multiple cisterns through a winding tunnel system and includes two mikva'ot. Artifacts recovered from this system include coins from the time of Emperor Vespasian (r. 69–79 CE). Another notable find is a silver pendant depicting a woman's face wearing a horned crown, likely representing the Egyptian goddess Isis. The pendant had been deliberately defaced, consistent with Jewish defacement of pagan images, a practice referenced in the Mishnah and seen elsewhere in Bar Kokhba-period finds.

==== Rock-cut tombs ====
At least fifteen rock-cut tombs were excavated in the vicinity of the site, most dating to the Second Temple period. The discovery of numerous ossuaries suggests that burial customs in the Judaean Lowlands were similar to those in Jerusalem and other regions. One burial complex is particularly elaborate, featuring a vaulted entrance chamber with plastered and painted walls, leading to two inner chambers—one with burial niches (kokhim), sealed in antiquity with a round rolling stone, and the other containing arched loculi (arcosolia). Within the arcosolia were stone ossuaries, most of which were found broken, though one ossuary and a limestone sarcophagus survived intact in their original positions. Pottery fragments dating to the late Second Temple period and the time of the Bar Kokhba revolt were found at the tomb.

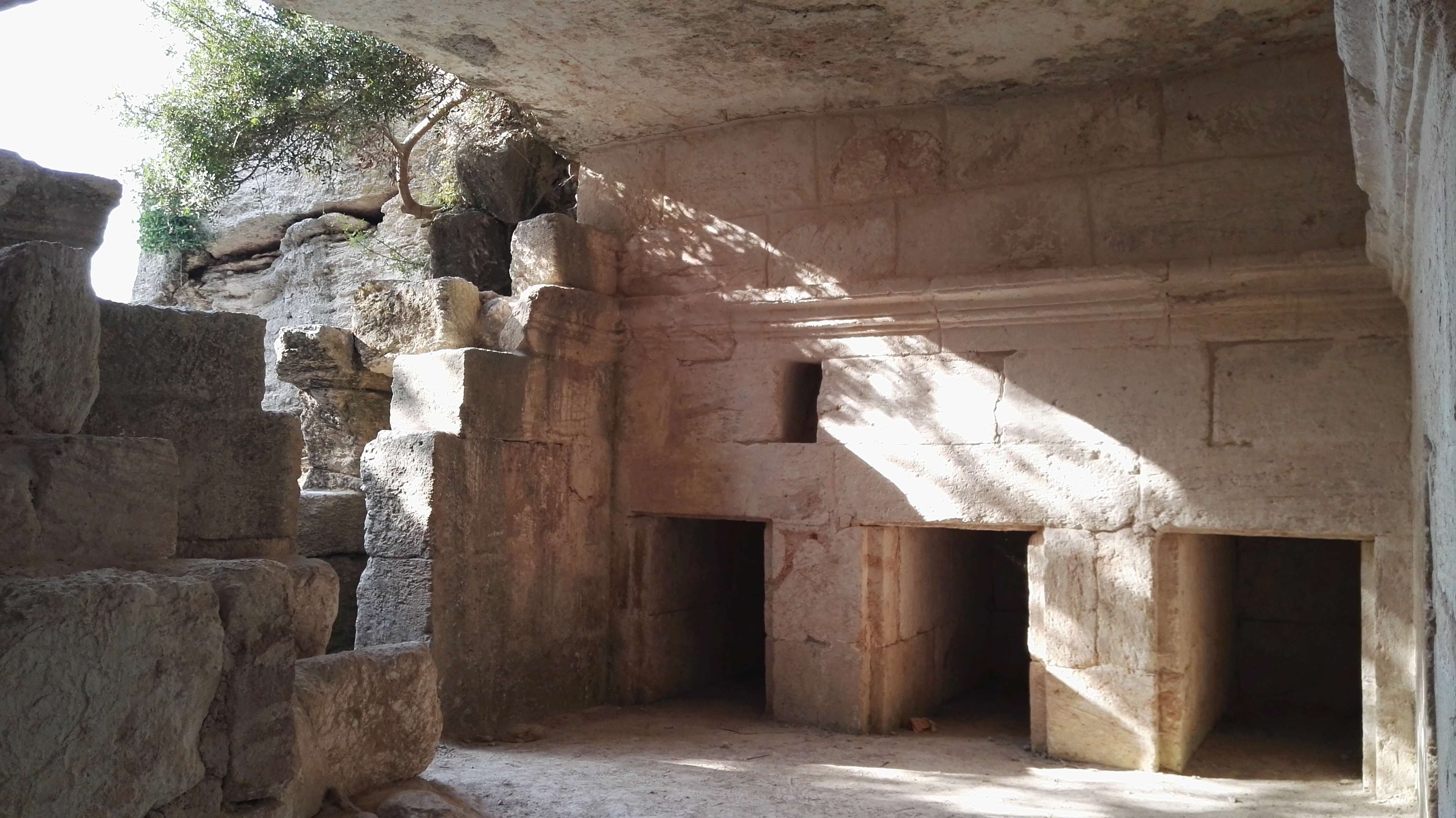
Elaborate Second Temple-era burial cave

=== Late Roman period ===
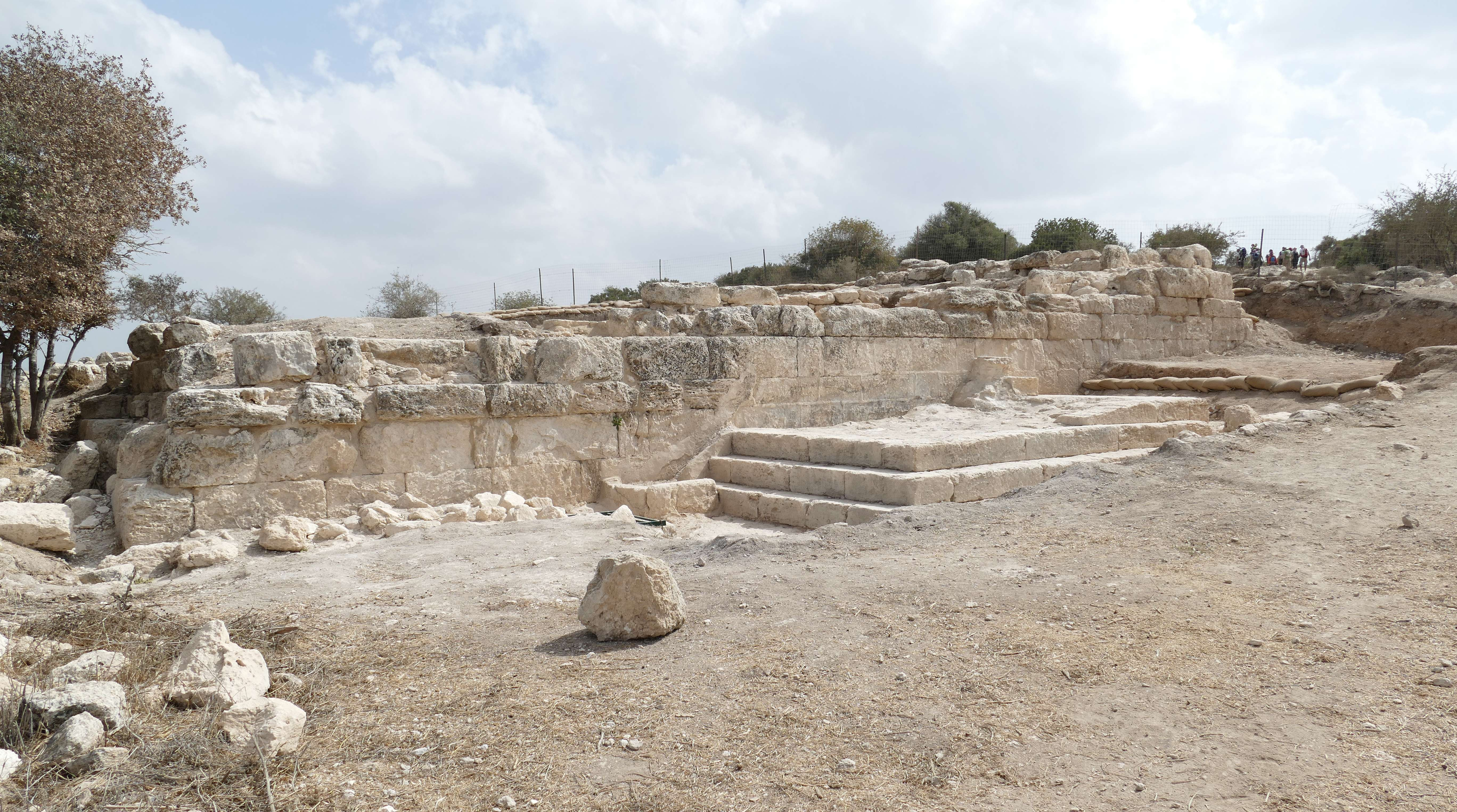
Cultic complex

In the aftermath of the Jewish–Roman wars, the site remained largely uninhabited. In the 2nd century CE, the area was inhabited by settlers under Roman authority, who practiced polytheism. During this time, a monumental cultic complex was constructed at the site, identified as a sanctuary or temple dedicated to polytheistic worship.

Later, in the 4th century, a burial cave was hewn. It appears to have remained unused. A basilica-shaped structure paved with white mosaics was also constructed, likely in connection with the cave. Its purpose had not yet been clearly discerned by 2012 due to the incomplete excavation of the apse area.

=== Byzantine period ===
==== Church ====
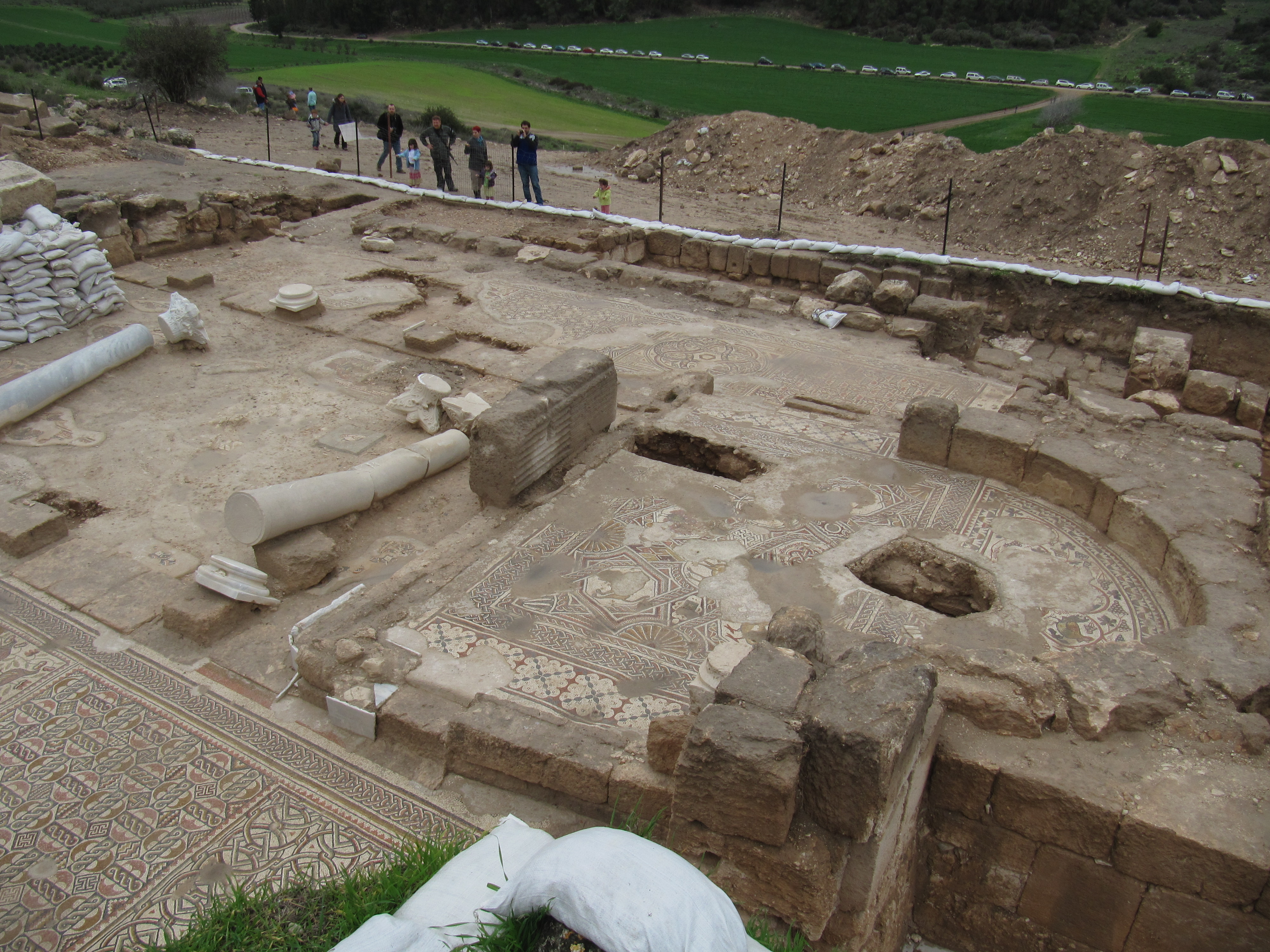
Byzantine-era church, showing the apse, marble columns and mosaics

During the Byzantine period (particularly in the 5th and 6th centuries), Horvat Midras was a small Christian village, due to either local conversions or the arrival of Christian immigrants. It may have also housed a monastic community. In the 6th century, a church was built within the remains of the earlier basilica, remaining in use until the 8th century. It features a central nave flanked by two side aisles (stoa), divided by two parallel rows of four imported light gray marble columns with Corinthian capitals. The church's floors are richly decorated with colorful mosaics, including animal motifs in the nave and apse, and geometric patterns in the aisles, using stones of various colors throughout. At the church's eastern end is a rounded apse, flanked by two rooms—one with a gray marble floor (south) and the other with a plain mosaic (north). The use of high-quality materials points to a wealthy patron, possibly the Bishop of Eleutheropolis or someone closely connected to his office.

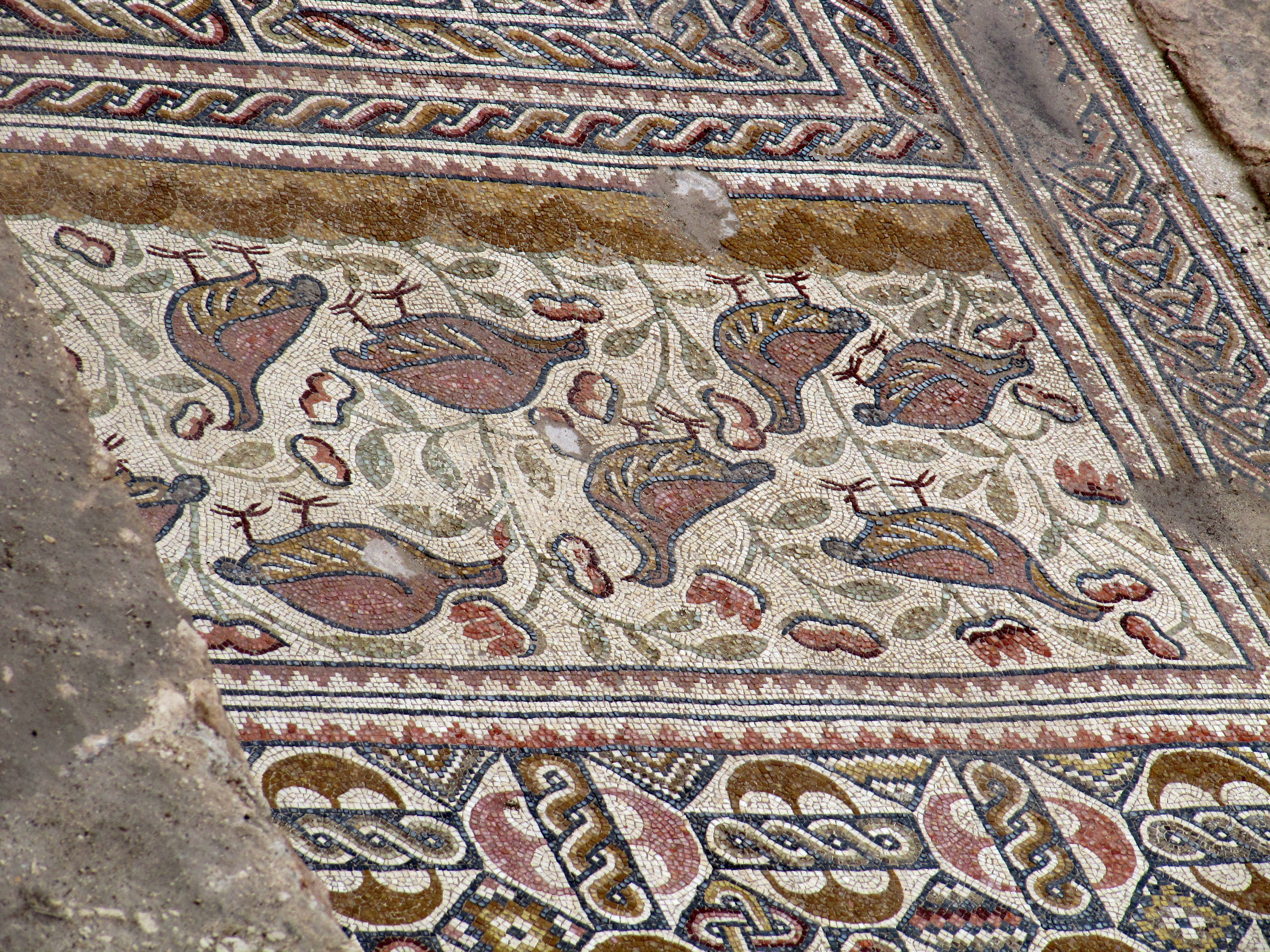
Mosaic of partridges in the floor of the southern aisle

A tomb beneath the church and a chamber south of the apse, possibly for storing relics, suggest the site was designed to attract pilgrims. These elements suggest that the church was designed to attract pilgrims.

==== Byzantine tomb ====
Several Byzantine-period burial caves have been identified in the area. One, located just south of the elaborate Second Temple-era tomb, is a small cave with three arcosolia, decorated with red-painted crosses and Greek inscriptions. These included the IX monogram, an abbreviation for Jesus Christ (Greek: Iēsous Christos), and the Greek letters Alpha and Omega, symbolizing the phrase "I am the beginning and the end" (Revelation 1:17).

=== Early Islamic period ===
Following the Muslim conquest of the Levant in the 630s, the church at Horvat Midras remained in use, though its carved crosses were deliberately plastered over, and access to the tomb and adjacent installations was rerouted to bypass the main sanctuary. Archaeologists suggest that this phase may represent either continued Christian use, shared occupation by Christians and Muslims, or use by recent converts to Islam. Additionally, one of the columbaria at the site can be dated to the Byzantine or early Islamic periods.

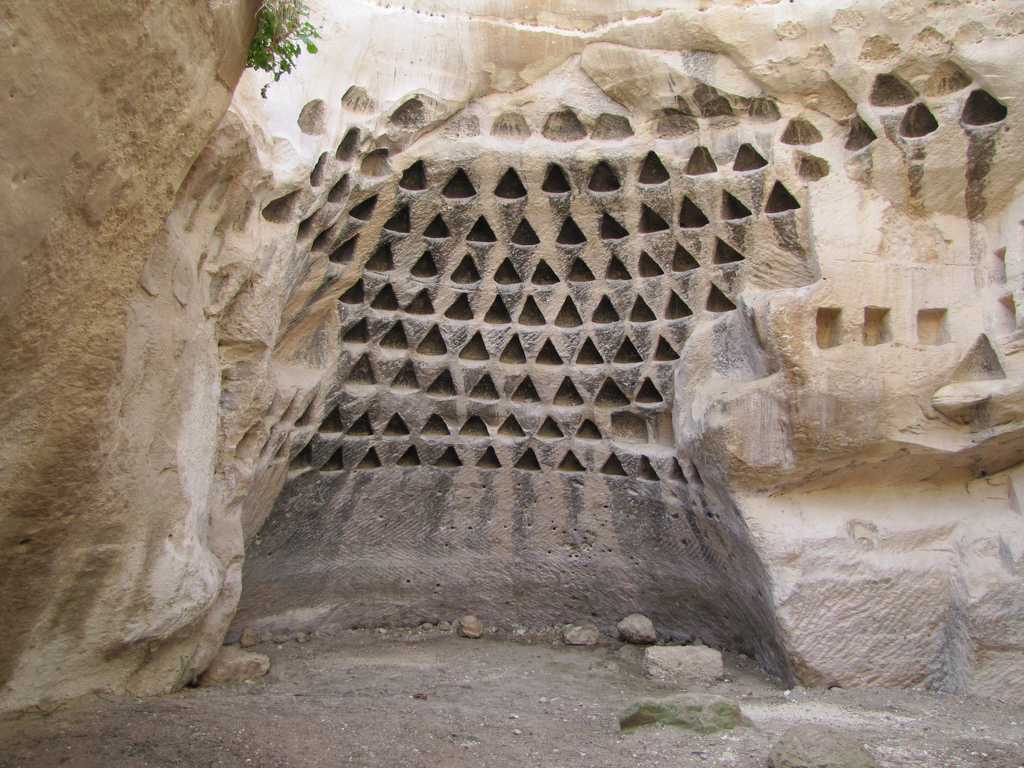
Columbarium cave dated to the Byzantine or early Islamic periods

The church collapsed during the 749 earthquake, and a modest rural settlement developed on the site likely in the late 8th or 9th century. Architectural elements from the earlier complex were reused as spolia, and Abbasid-period domestic pottery recovered from the narthex confirms that the building had lost its religious function.

=== Ayyubid and Mamluk periods ===
Following several centuries of abandonment, Muslims reoccupied the site in the Ayyubid period. Under Ayyubid and Mamluk control (13th–16th centuries), Horvat Midras was a small agricultural village. Excavations revealed substantial Mamluk-period architecture and abundant ceramic material, indicating that the settlement prospered at this time.

=== Ottoman period ===
The site is recorded as Darusiyya in Ottoman tax registers. In the 1525/6 census (932 AH), it was part of the Hebron subdistrict (nahiya), and its villagers also cultivated fields at a place called Bayt Hawran. The village's economy was based on subsistence agriculture, including the cultivation of cereals, olives, figs, almonds, and grapes. By the 1550s, Darusiyya had ceased functioning as a permanent village, becoming a seasonal settlement ('izbeh). In the 1553/4 census (961 AH), the village was described as derelict, while in 1562/3 (970 AH) and 1596/7 (1005 AH) it was again reported as inhabited. Archaeological and historical evidence shows that by the mid-16th century, habitation was limited to the reuse of earlier Roman and Byzantine structures for herding and small-scale cultivation, with excavations revealing sheep pens, makeshift shelters, and Ottoman pottery indicative of transient rural occupation.

Excavations at Horvat Midras uncovered a rare Ottoman-period mold used to cast lead musket balls, found hidden inside a roughly built wall belonging to a temporary structure. The mold was deliberately concealed between stones and never recovered, suggesting concern over security and the risks associated with owning firearms in an unstable rural setting. Its presence indicates that people using the site in the late 16th or 17th century produced ammunition locally, likely for personal protection. This find also provides evidence of how abandoned ancient ruins were reused for shelter and security during the Ottoman period.

Following this, the village was deserted, and its lands were granted to another group, possibly from the Hebron Hills. During the late Ottoman period, the site was used mainly as pastureland, in line with a wider regional shift toward pastoral mobility in response to Bedouin incursions, internal village disputes, and administrative changes in early Ottoman Palestine.

== Research history ==
Early documentation of Horvat Midras includes surveys by Victor Guérin in 1868 and the Palestine Exploration Fund in the 1880s. Claude Reignier Conder and Herbert Kitchener of the PEF documented "Heaps of stones, foundations. A ruined birkeh, and several caves".

In the mid-20th century, Levi Rahmani conducted surveys (1958–59), followed by further investigations of burial caves and underground installations by Amos Kloner and Amos Frumkin from the 1970s to the early 1990s, often in response to antiquities looting. Two rock-cut tombs were uncovered in 1976 and 1988. A 1981 survey documented 56 caves and underground systems carved into the chalk bedrock beneath all parts of the settlement. These included columbaria, water cisterns, quarries, storage chambers, and hiding complexes.

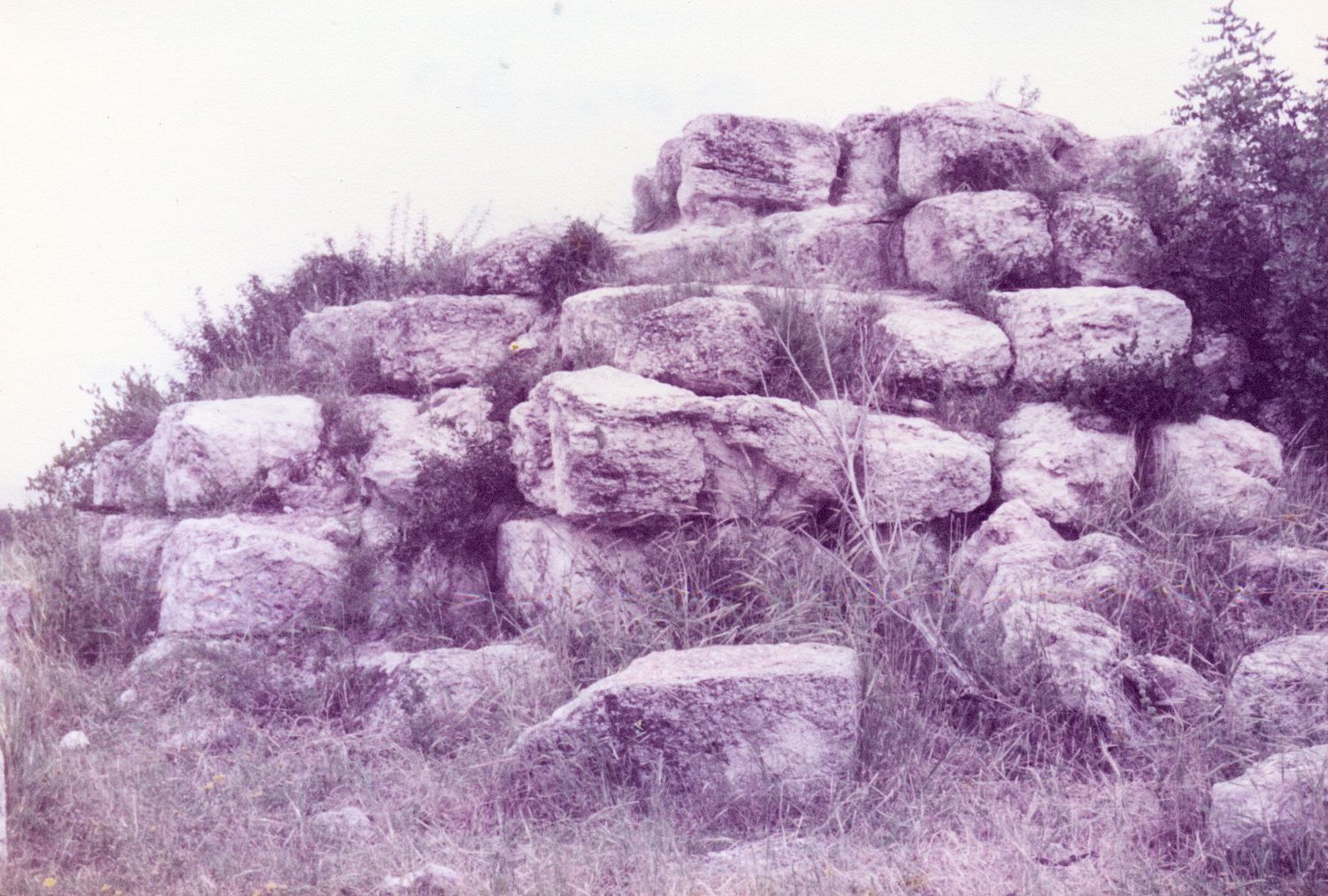
The pyramid, pictured in 1980

In 1991, archeologist Zvi Ilan examined a structure in the northern part of the site built of finely dressed ashlar stones, which he suggested may be the remains of an ancient synagogue. Small architectural elements with relief decoration were found nearby. As of 2012, the structure had not yet been excavated, and its function remains uncertain.

In 2010–2011, the Israel Antiquities Authority conducted excavations at the site following illegal digging. The project was led by archaeologists Amir Ganor and Alon Klein, with Rina Avner and Boaz Zissu contributing to the study of the mosaics and hiding complexes, respectively.

Horvat Midras was revisited in a renewed academic expedition led by the Hebrew University of Jerusalem. The excavation was directed by Orit Peleg-Barkat, with Gregg E. Gardner of the University of British Columbia later joining as co-director. The project included survey seasons in 2015 and 2016, followed by four excavation seasons between 2016 and 2022, focusing on evaluating the site's monumental architecture and its relationship to local elite identity and funerary practices.

== See also ==
- Archaeology of the Bar Kokhba Revolt
- Horvat 'Ethri
- Horvat Burgin
- Khirbet Beit Lei
- Khirbet el-Ein
- Tel Goded
- Tel Lavnin

== Bibliography ==
- Abel, Félix-Marie (1938). Géographie de la Palestine. Vol. 2. Paris: Librairie Lecoffre.
- Conder, Claude Reignier; Kitchener, Herbert (1883). The Survey of Western Palestine: Memoirs of the Topography, Orography, Hydrography and Archaeology. Vol. III. London: Committee of the Palestine Exploration Fund.
- Dayan, Ayelet (2025). Christian Settlements and Monasteries in the Northern Judaean Shephelah and the Western Samaria Hills During the Byzantine Period. Archaeopress Archaeology. pp. 83–84. ISBN 9781803279411. JSTOR 27739559.
- Ganor, Amir; Klein, Alon; Avner, Rina; Zissu, Boaz (2011). "שרידי כנסייה ביזנטית בחורבת מדרס שבשפלת יהודה" [Remains of a Byzantine Church at Ḥorvat Midras in the Judean Shephelah]. Qadmoniot: A Journal for the Antiquities of Eretz-Israel and Bible Lands (in Hebrew) (142): 95–101. JSTOR 23685823.
- Ganor, Amir; Klein, Alon; Avner, Rina; Zissu, Boaz (2012). "Horbat Midras: Preliminary Report". Hadashot Arkheologiyot: Excavations and Surveys in Israel. 124: 1–10. JSTOR 26601505.
- Gardner, Gregg E.; Peleg-Barkat, Orit (2024). "Conspicuous Construction: New Light on Funerary Monuments in Rural Early Roman Judea from Horvat Midras". Bulletin of the American Society of Overseas Research. 391 (1): 1–23. doi:10.1086/728460.
- Peleg-Barkat, Orit; Marom, Roy; Gardner, Gregg E.; Chernin, Michael; Kharanbeh, Saleh (2025). "Rural adaptation and settlement change in the late Islamic Jabal al-Khalīl (Judean Foothills)". Journal of Historical Geography. 90: 87–98.
- Peleg-Barkat, Orit; Farhi, Yoav; Gardner, Gregg E.; Marom, Roy; Kharanbeh, Saleh (2025). "An Ottoman Period Musket-Ball Mold from Khirbet Drūsye/Horvat Midras: Echoes of Changing Times". Israel Exploration Journal. 75 (2): 90–107.
- Raiskin, Shlomy (2007). "שאלת זהותו של בן דרוסאי" [On the Identity of Ben Drusai]. Sidra: A Journal for the Study of Rabbinic Literature (in Hebrew): 177–184. JSTOR 24174268.
- Stiebel, G. D. (2016). "A Note Concerning the Origin of the Name Ḥorvat Midras/Drousia". Scripta Classica Israelica. 35: 137–139. doi:10.71043/sci.v35i.2257.
- Toledano, Ehud R. (1984). "The Sanjak of Jerusalem in the Sixteenth Century: Aspects of Topography and Population". Archivum Ottomanicum. 9. Wiesbaden: Otto Harrassowitz: 279–319.
- Zissu, Boaz; Kloner, Amos (2010). "Horvat Midras (Kh. Durusiya): A Reassessment of an Archaeological Site from the Second Temple Period and the Bar-Kokhba Revolt". In Faust, A. (ed.). New Studies on Jerusalem (in Hebrew). Vol. 16. Ramat Gan: Bar-Ilan University. pp. 231–253.
- Zissu, Boaz; Kloner, Amihai; Ganor, Amit; Avner, Roni; Klein, Avi (2016). "Horvat Midras (Khirbet Durusiya): An Ancient Settlement and its Artificial Cavities in the Judean Foothills, Israel" (PDF). Opera Ipogea. 2: 11–28.
- Zissu, Boaz; Ganor, Amir; Avner, Rina; Klein, Alon (2024). "Archaeological explorations above and below ground at Horvat Midras, Judean Foothills, Israel". Journal of Ancient History and Archaeology. 11 (4). doi:10.14795/j.v11i4.1144.
