= Horvat 'Ethri =

Archeological site in Israel

Coordinates: 31.6494720°N 34.9720070°E

Hurvat Itri
- Hebrew: חורבת עתרי, Arabic: Umm Suweid
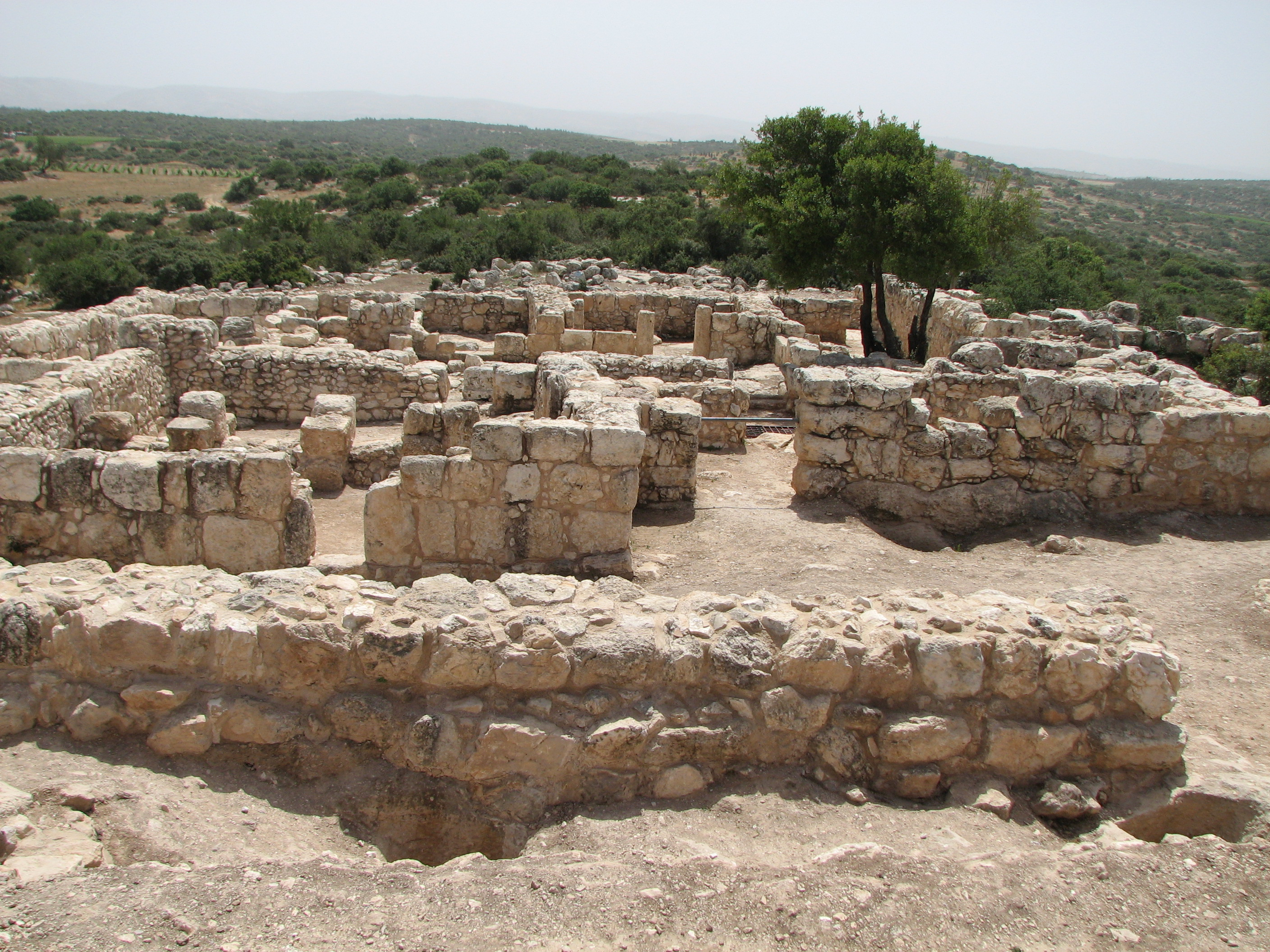
- Archaeological remains at Hurvat Itri

- Location within Israel
- Type: settlement
- Periods: Second Temple period
- Cultures: Second Temple Judaism, Roman
- Associated with: Jews, Romans
- Location: Jerusalem District, Israel
- Region: Shephelah

History
- Event(s): First Jewish-Roman War, Bar Kokhba Revolt

Site notes
- Height: 416
- Area: max 10 dunam
- Archaeologists: Boaz Zissu, Amir Ganor
- Condition: Partially restored
- Public access: Open year round
- "Horvat 'Ethri" is how the excavator, Boaz Zissu, transliterates the Hebrew name

Horvat 'Ethri (Hebrew: חורבת עתרי, lit. 'Ruin of Ethri'; also spelled Hurvat Itri, Ethri, Atari), or Umm Suweid (Arabic for "mother of the buckthorns"), is an archaeological site situated in the Judean Lowlands in modern-day Israel. Excavations at the site have uncovered the remains of a partially restored Jewish village from the Second Temple period. The site features an ancient synagogue, wine presses, cisterns, mikvehs (ritual baths), stone ossuaries, and an underground hideout system.

Damaged and temporarily abandoned during the First Jewish–Roman War, the village was ultimately and violently destroyed during the Bar Kokhba revolt, as evidenced by a destruction layer and a mass grave found in a mikveh, which contained the remains of fifteen individuals, including one showing signs of beheading, as well as broken tools and coins.

The site is identified with Caphethra, a village on the Judaean Foothills mentioned by Josephus as destroyed during a campaign by units of the Legio V Macedonica in the area in 69 CE.

== Location ==
The site sits upon an elevation of 406 metres (1,332 ft) above sea level. It is located southeast of Bet Shemesh, within the Adullam-France Park – c. 35 kilometers (22 mi) southwest of Jerusalem, 5 kilometers (3.1 mi) southeast of the Elah Valley and 8 kilometers (5.0 mi) northeast of Beth Guvrin.

== Excavations ==
A rescue excavation was carried out at Hurvat Ethri in 1999–2000 on behalf of the Israel Antiquities Authority (IAA) following a long-running looting at the site. Its purpose was to uncover the ancient remains and make the site accessible to tourists. As early as 2004, excavations were conducted on the site by Amir Ganor and Sari Eliyahu. In 2016, an additional survey-excavation was made of the site by Eitan Klein, Amir Ganor, and G. Goldenberg on behalf of the IAA.

== History ==
=== Persian period (Phase I) ===
The site was first occupied during the late Persian period; artifacts of the period include Yehud coins, a coin minted in Babylon and two fakes of Athenian coins.

=== Hellenistic and Hasmonean periods (Phase II) ===
Numerous remains from the Hellenistic period have been discovered at the site, including rooms incorporated into later buildings, cisterns, and underground quarries. Since the majority of the structures were dismantled or incorporated into later structures, it is difficult to determine the extent of the hamlet during this period. The size of the site during this time was greater than 7 dunams, according to coinage and the location of the rock-cut sections on the property. A few Hasmonean period prutahs as well as coins of Seleucid rulers Antiochus VII and Demetrius II struck at the Tyre mint are examples of artifacts from the time.

The site's material culture suggests that its residents throughout the Hellenistic period were Jews, and some of the ritual baths that have been found there are most likely from this time period.

=== Early Roman period (Phase III) ===
During the early first century CE, large-scale development took place on the site. The village reached its peak size on the eve of the First Jewish-Roman War, when its built-up site encompassed around 10 dunams.

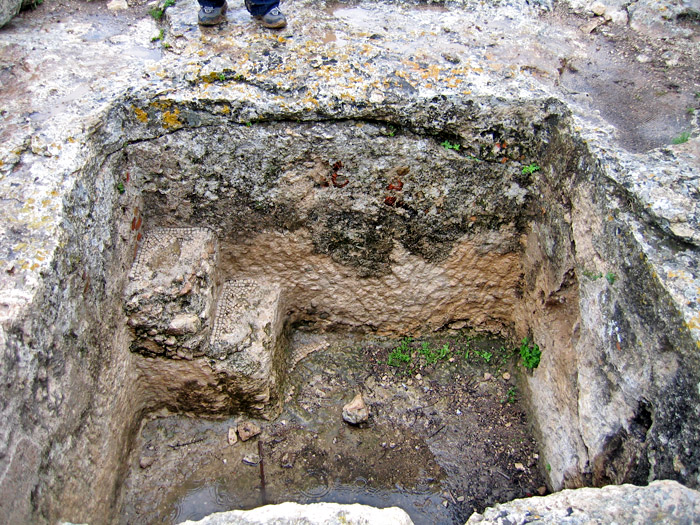
The vat of a winepress, at Hurvat Itri

Archaeological findings at the site reveal that its inhabitants had several sources of income, namely, a columbarium facility for breeding doves and producing fertilizer, and loom and spindle weights for spinning and weaving. However, its numerous wine presses suggest that the town's inhabitants were engaged in viniculture.

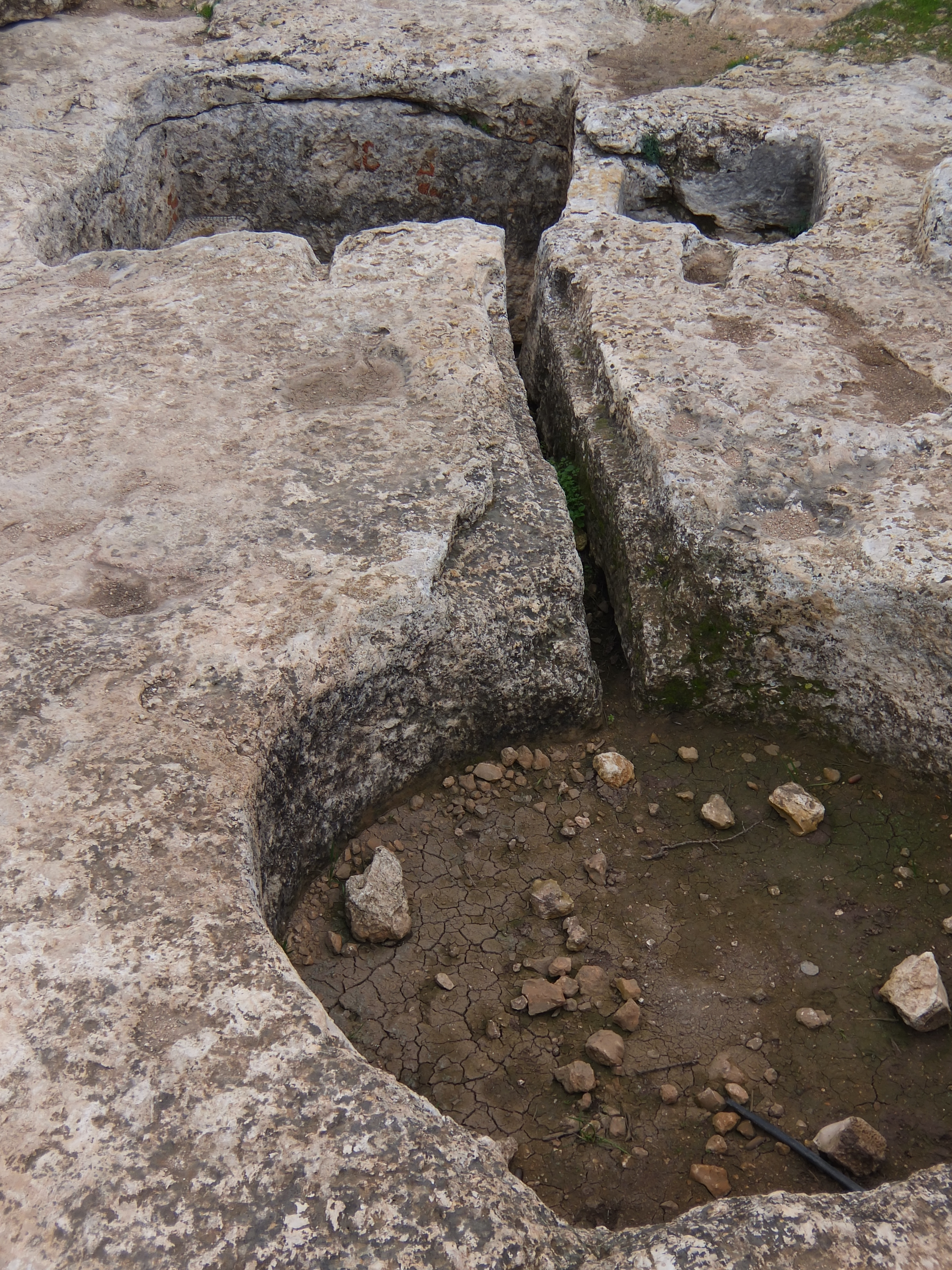
A Wine press carved into the rock at the ruin

==== First Jewish–Roman War ====
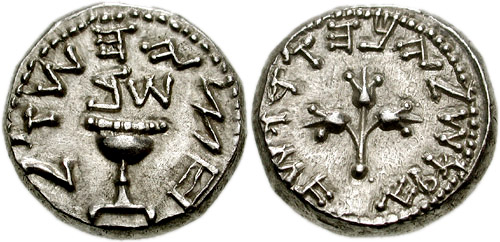
The half-Shekel coin discovered in Hurvat Itri

During the First Jewish–Roman War (66-73 CE), the village suffered damage, had some of its structures demolished, and was momentarily abandoned. Of special interest were the discoveries of small coins from the 2nd and 3rd year of the revolt, particularly, a silver half-shekel coin from the 3rd year of the revolt, upon which are embossed the words "Half-Shekel" in the Paleo-Hebrew script (Hebrew: חצי השקל), and having a silver content of 6.87 grams, discovered in an area of the site known as "complex XIV," and a bronze coin with a date-palm tree and the inscription, "El'azar the Priest," on its obverse side, and a cluster of grapes with the inscription, "Year One of the Freedom of Israel," on its reverse side.

Based on a potsherd found at the site bearing the name "Ethri", and the village's size on the eve of the revolt, it has been suggested that the site should be identified with Caphethra, a village on the Judaean Foothills mentioned by Josephus as destroyed during a campaign by units of the Legio V Macedonica in the area in 69 CE.

==== Between the revolts ====
Jews resettled the village between the two revolts; perhaps some of them were the original occupants who went back to their homes. They rebuilt some of the structures and modified them to meet their needs. The resettled village, which was half as big as the old one, was concentrated on the site's eastern side. A public structure, which may have served as a synagogue, was constructed next to the residential quarters.

==== Bar Kokhba revolt ====
Before the Bar Kokhba revolt (132–136 CE), extensive underground complexes were constructed beneath the village's homes. During the revolt, locals used them as places to hide and store food and supplies. Before excavations began, one of the complexes had already been looted; the other, however, was discovered untouched and included a few remnants of the Bar Kokhba revolt, such as candles typical of the period and three bronze coins that the Bar Kokhba administration had re-minted.

The settlement was brutally destroyed during the Bar Kokhba revolt, as evidenced by a destruction layer, the remains of which were discovered in the site's center. Around 15 people who were killed in the fighting were buried in a mass grave in one of the ritual baths. The bones were combined with ashes, burned wood pieces, bent glass, tools, and Trajan and Vespasian coinage. One of those buried there may have been beheaded with a sword, according to the cutting marks on his cervical vertebrae.

The site stands out among other archaeological sites because of its formidable defensive walls, with massive stones, which led Boaz Zissu, to believe that it may have been one of the fifty strongholds in Judea destroyed by Hadrian during the Bar Kokhba revolt.

=== Late Roman period (Phase IV) ===
Not long after 200 CE, a new population restored the structures on the site. This population may have been pagan or veterans of the Roman army who received lands close to Eleuthropolis that had just been re-founded. While this era lasted 150 years, there weren't many significant architectural changes. A 1st century underground room had a burial cave cut into it, including a few reliefs. The site was abandoned in the second part of the 4th century, and only shepherds and nomads continued to frequent it afterwards.

According to Finnish scholar, Aapeli Saarisalo, who visited the site in the earlier 20th-century, the village was settled as late as the Byzantine and Early Arab period.

== Name ==
Formerly known in Arabic as Umm Suweid ("mother of the buckthorns"), the Modern Hebrew name of the site was only applied in March 2001 by the Israel Official Names Commission, after a team of IAA archaeologists discovered an ostracon bearing the name "Ethri," thought to be a reference to the a town described by Josephus and whom he names "Caphethra" – likely a Greek corruption of the Hebrew name Kfar Ethra, "Ethra Village".

== Gallery ==
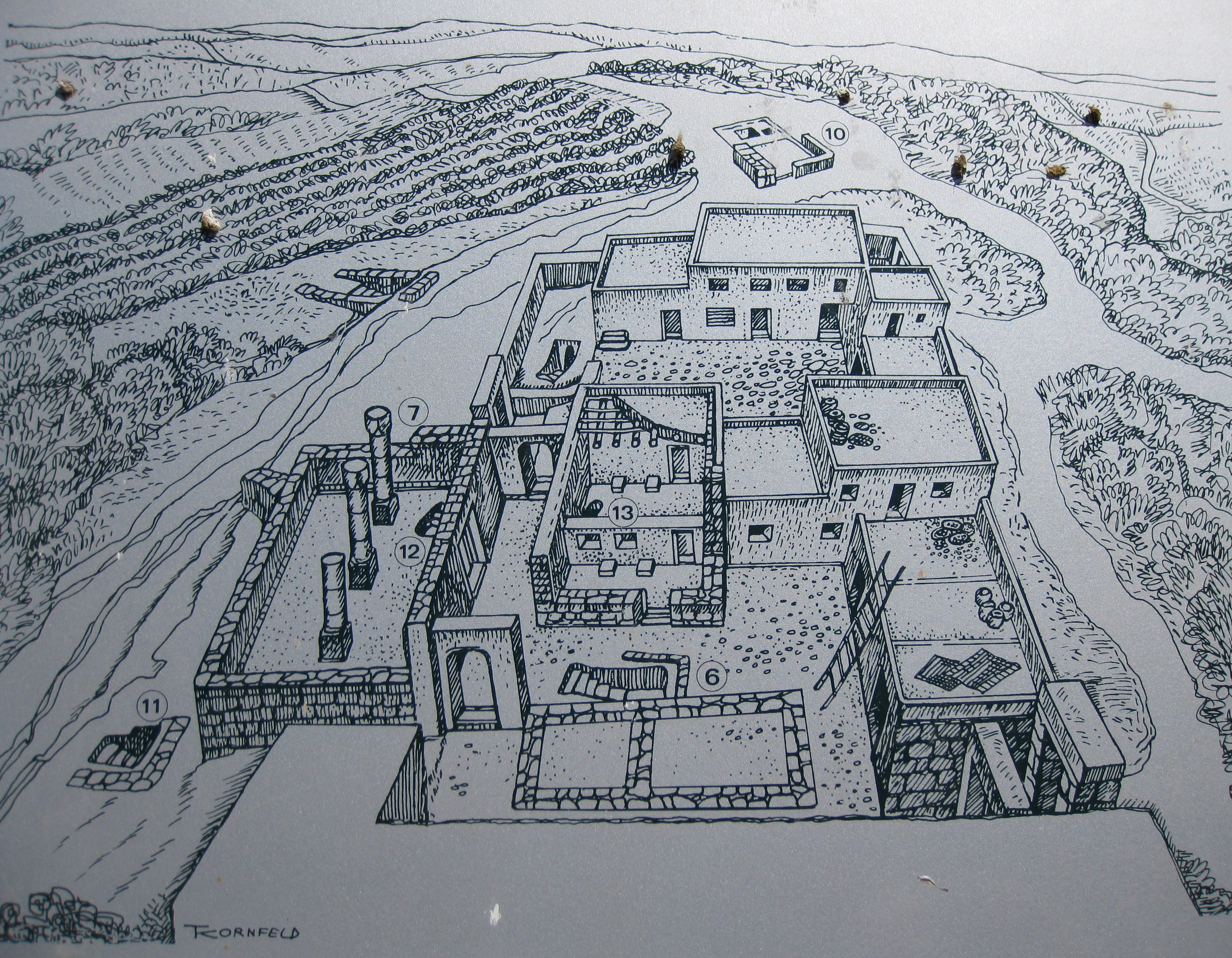
Recreation of what some of the structures may have looked like.

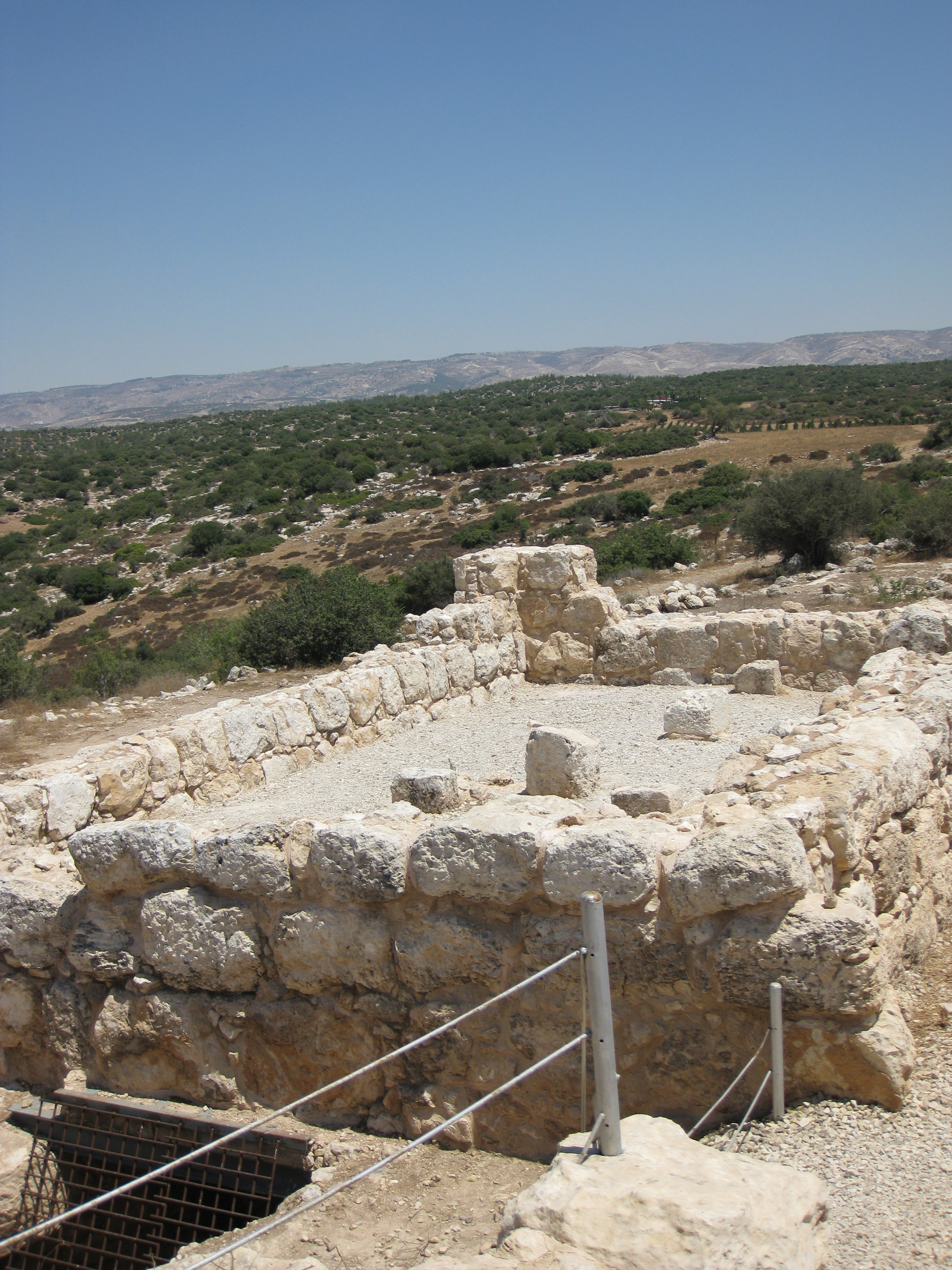
Archaeological remains.

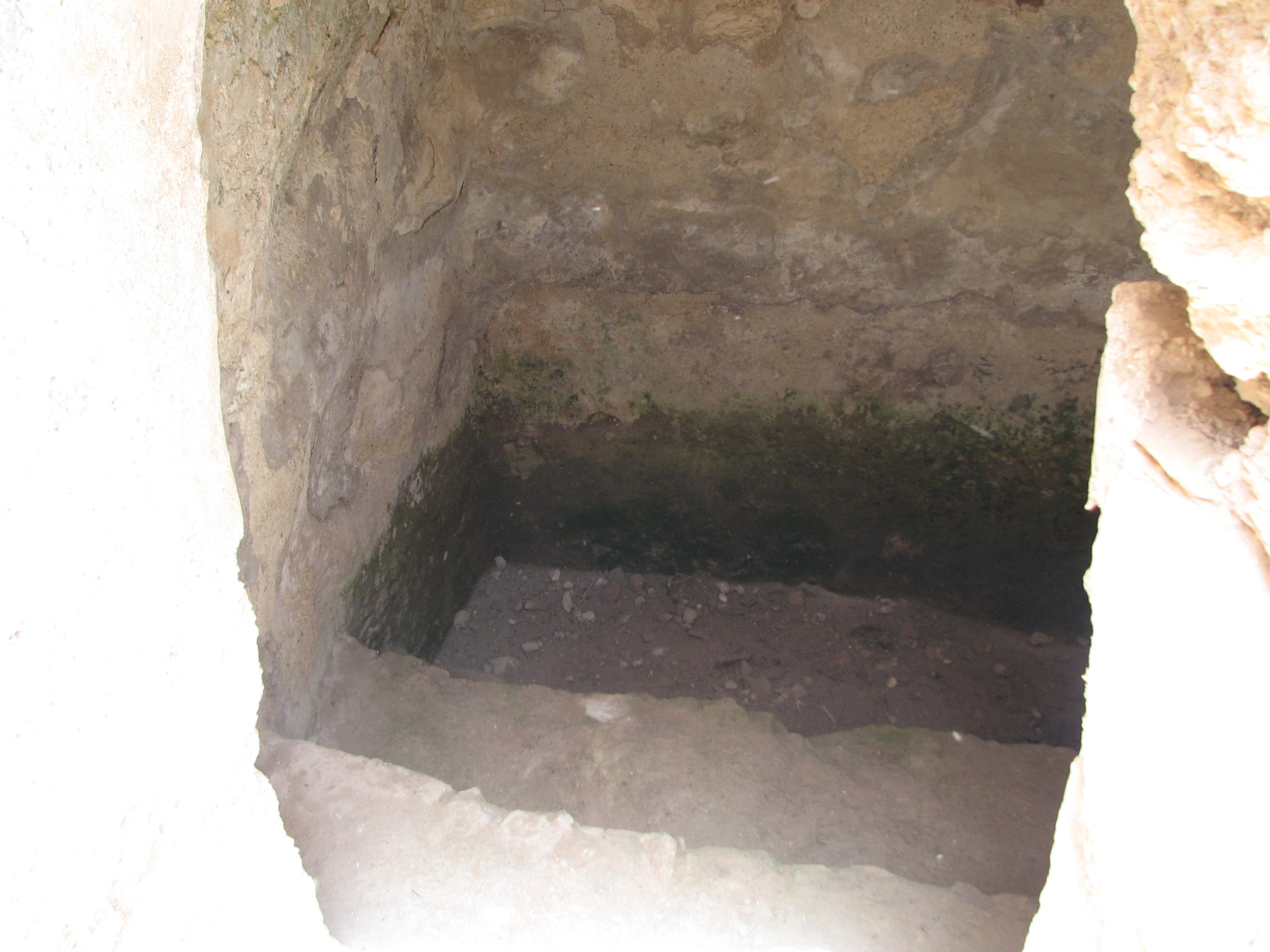
Ancient Jewish Mikveh uncovered at the site.

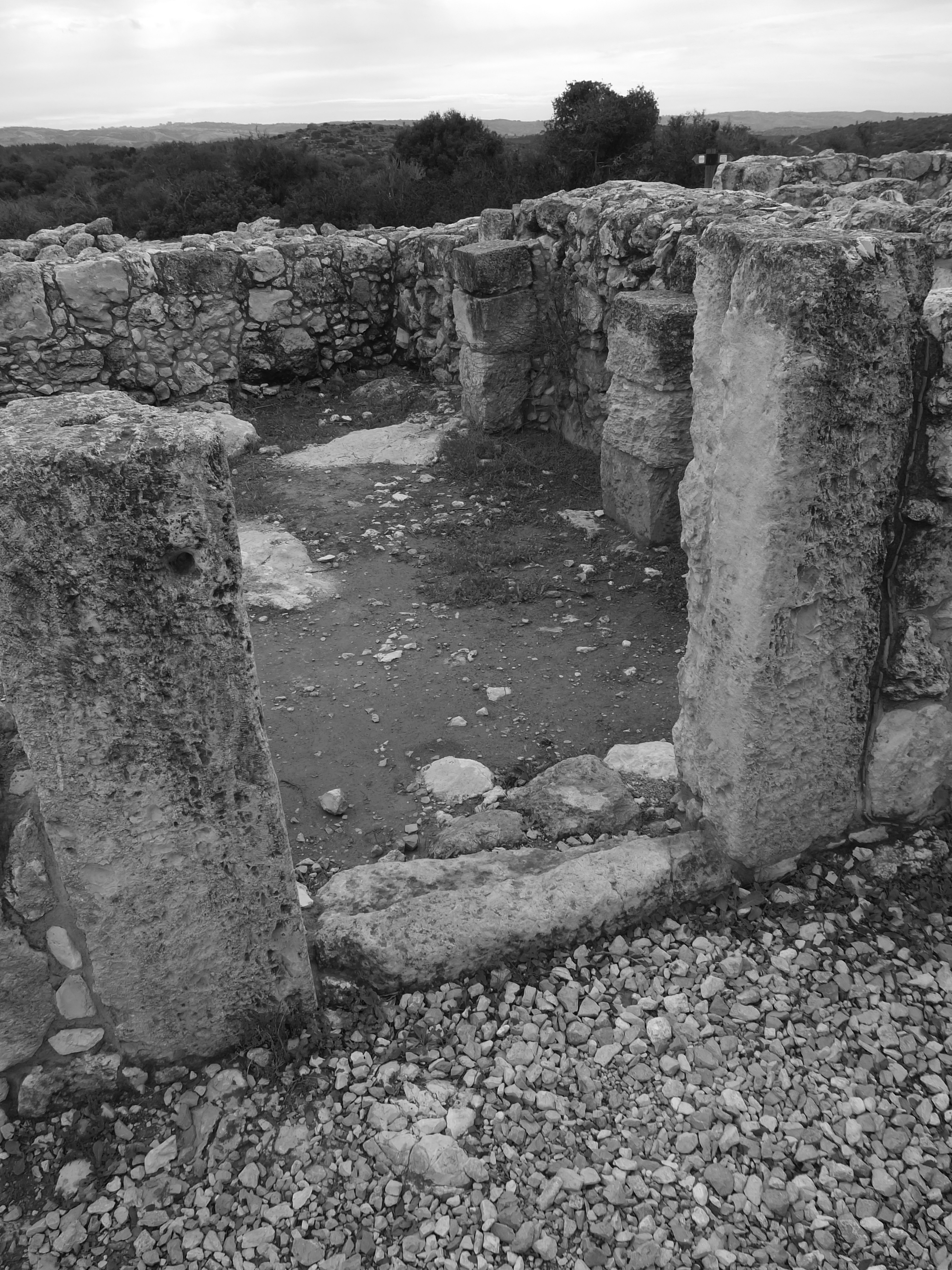
Ruin of Hurvat Itri

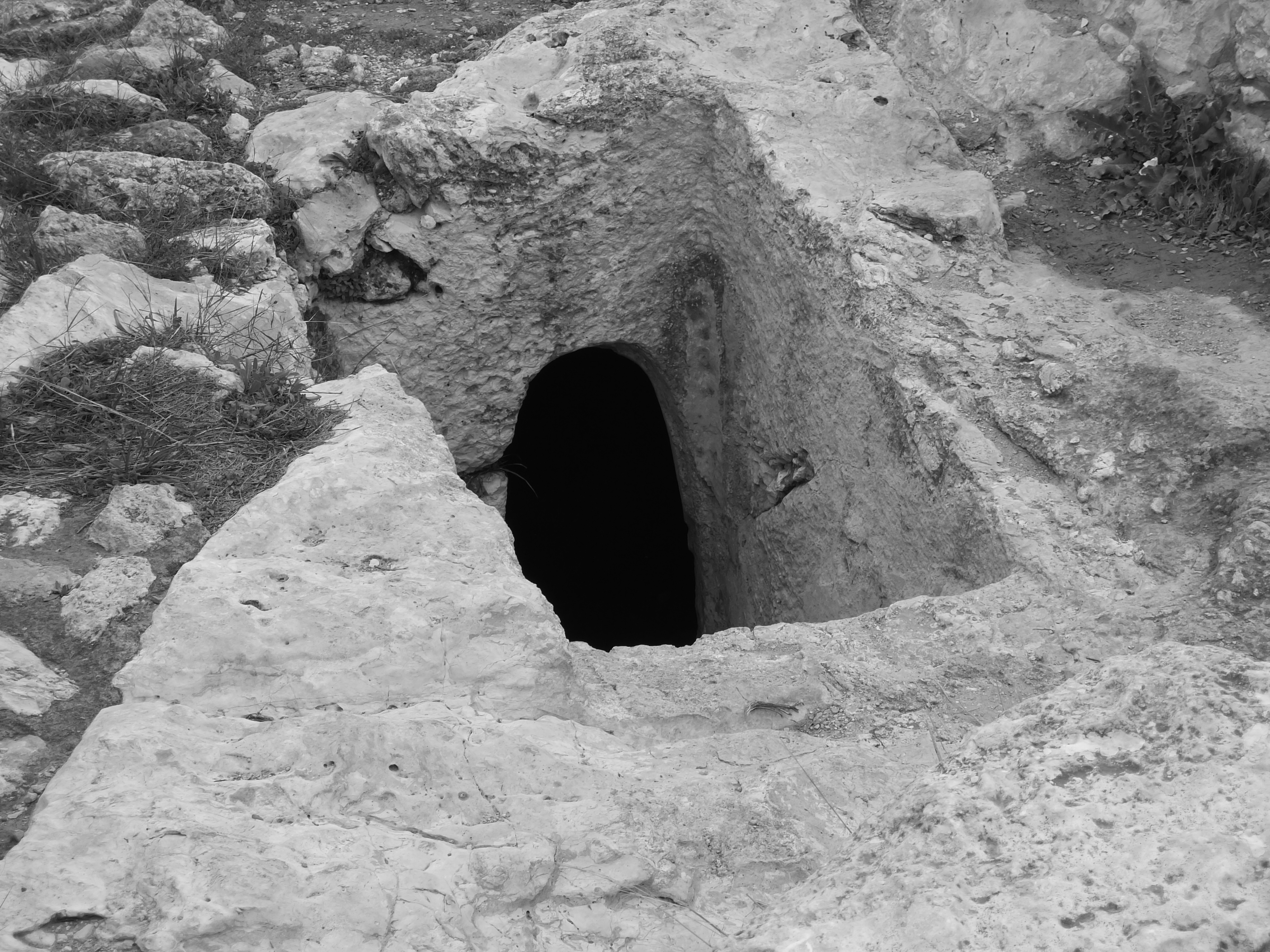
Entrance to cavern

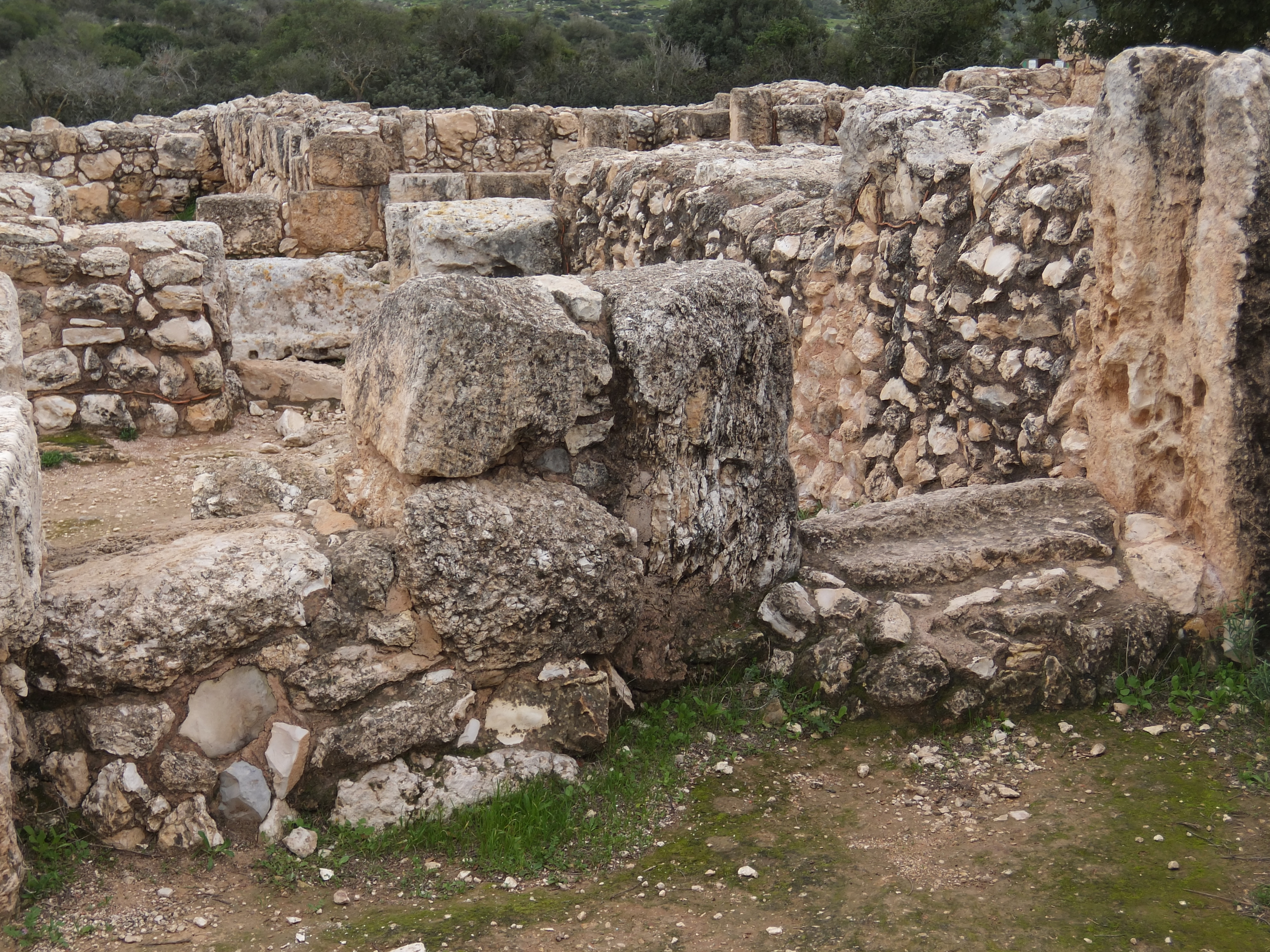
Entranceway to ruined house

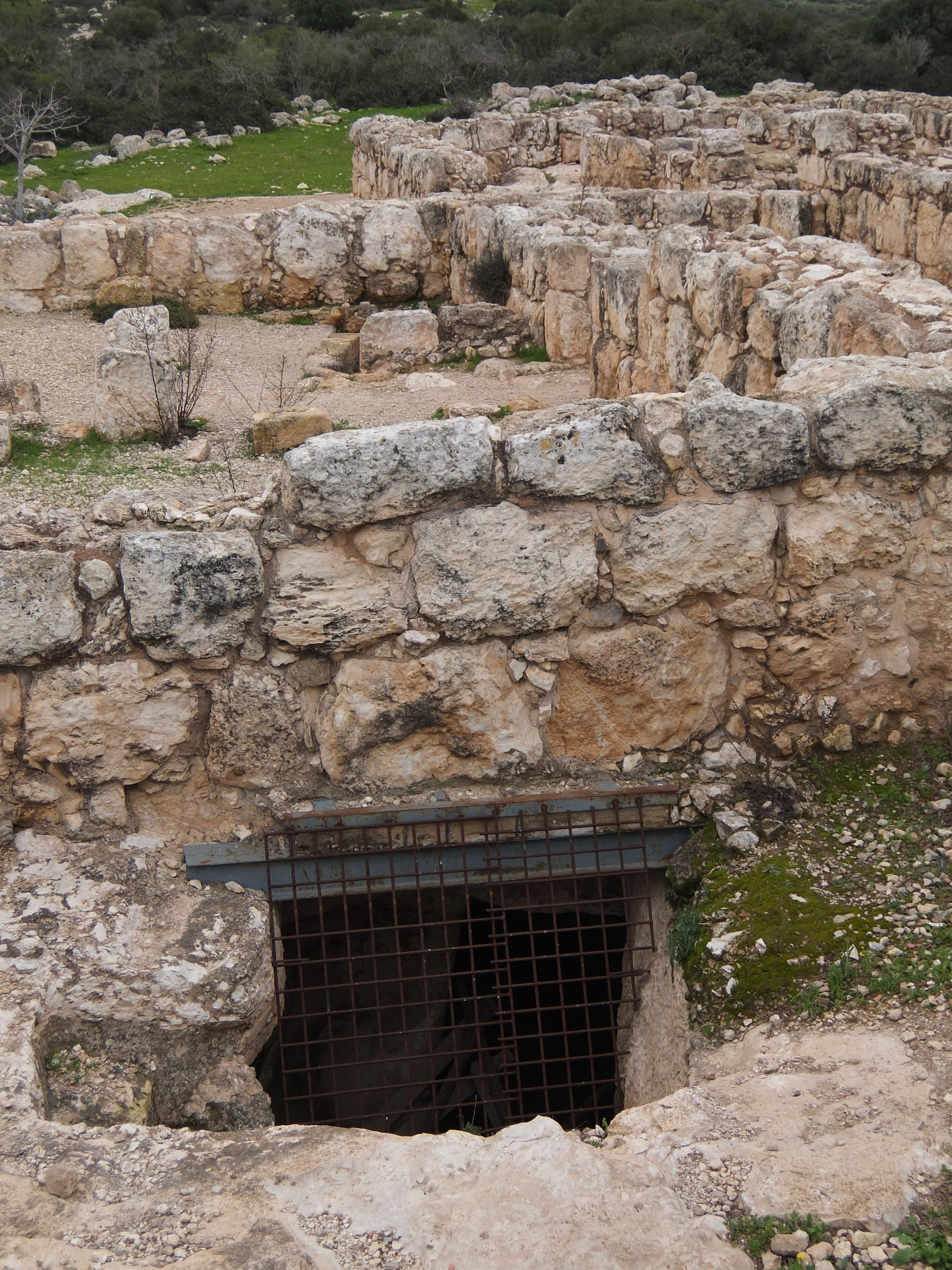
Sealed entrance in Hurvat Itri

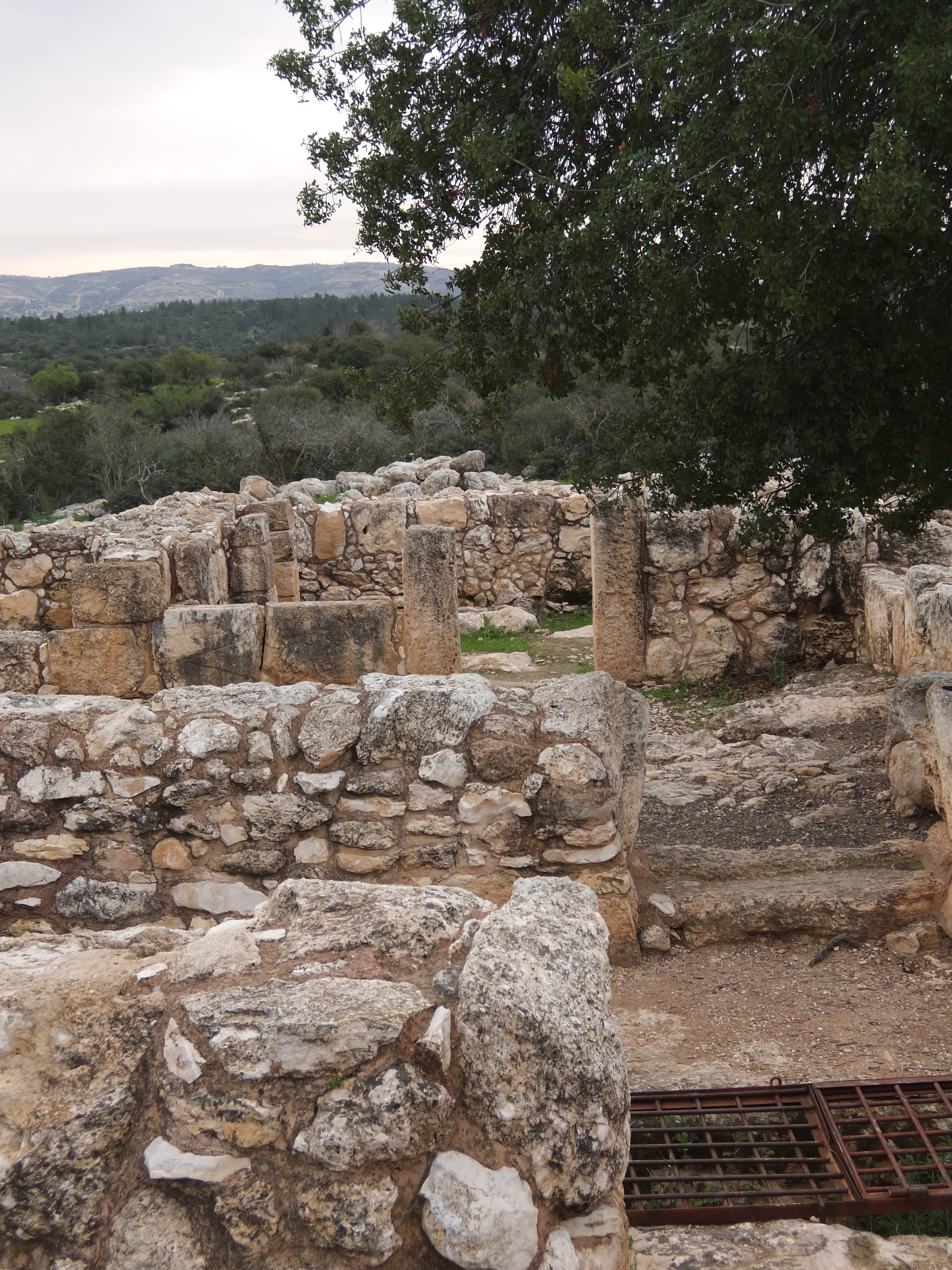
Ruins of Hurvat Itri

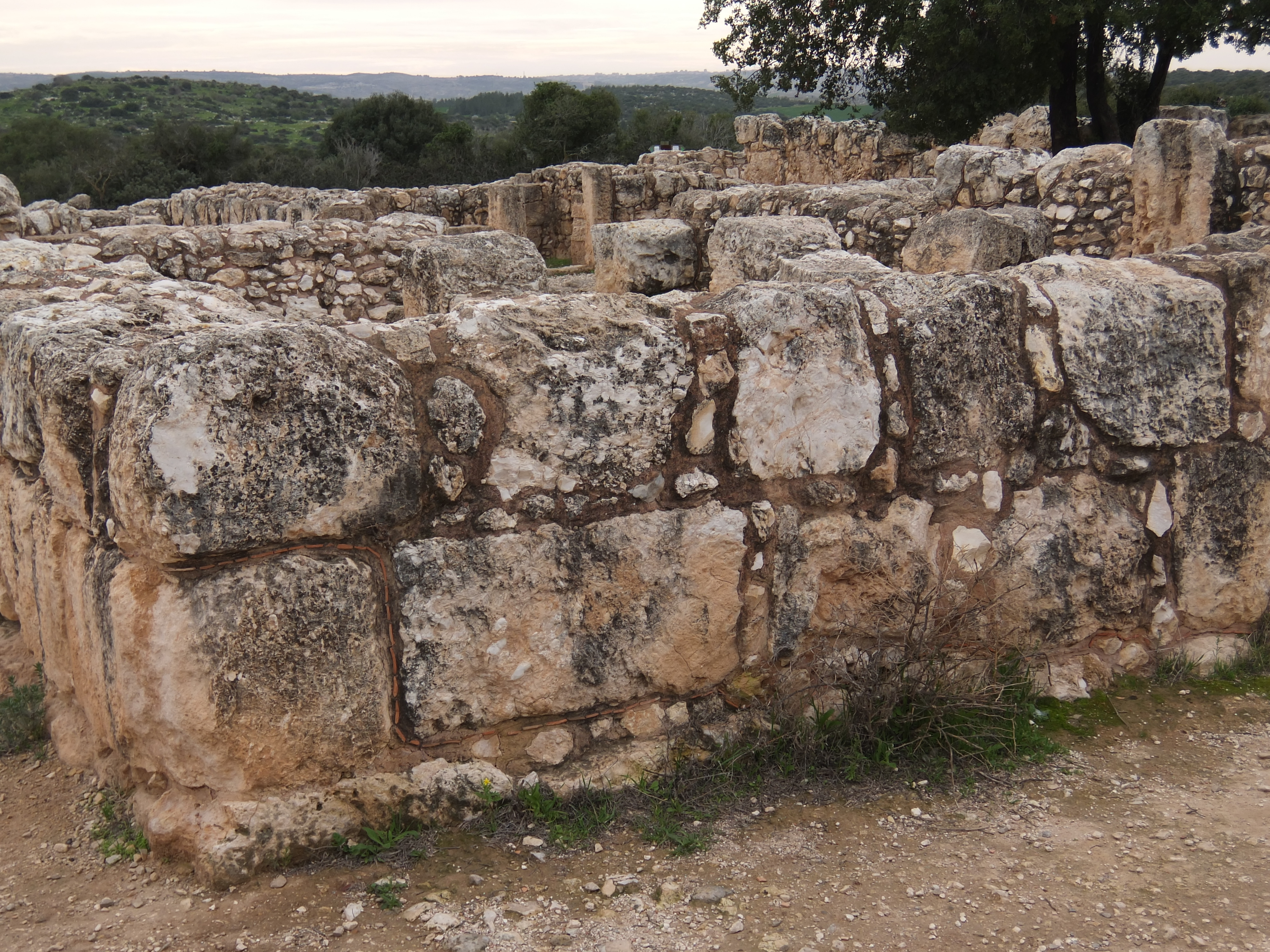
Stone wall

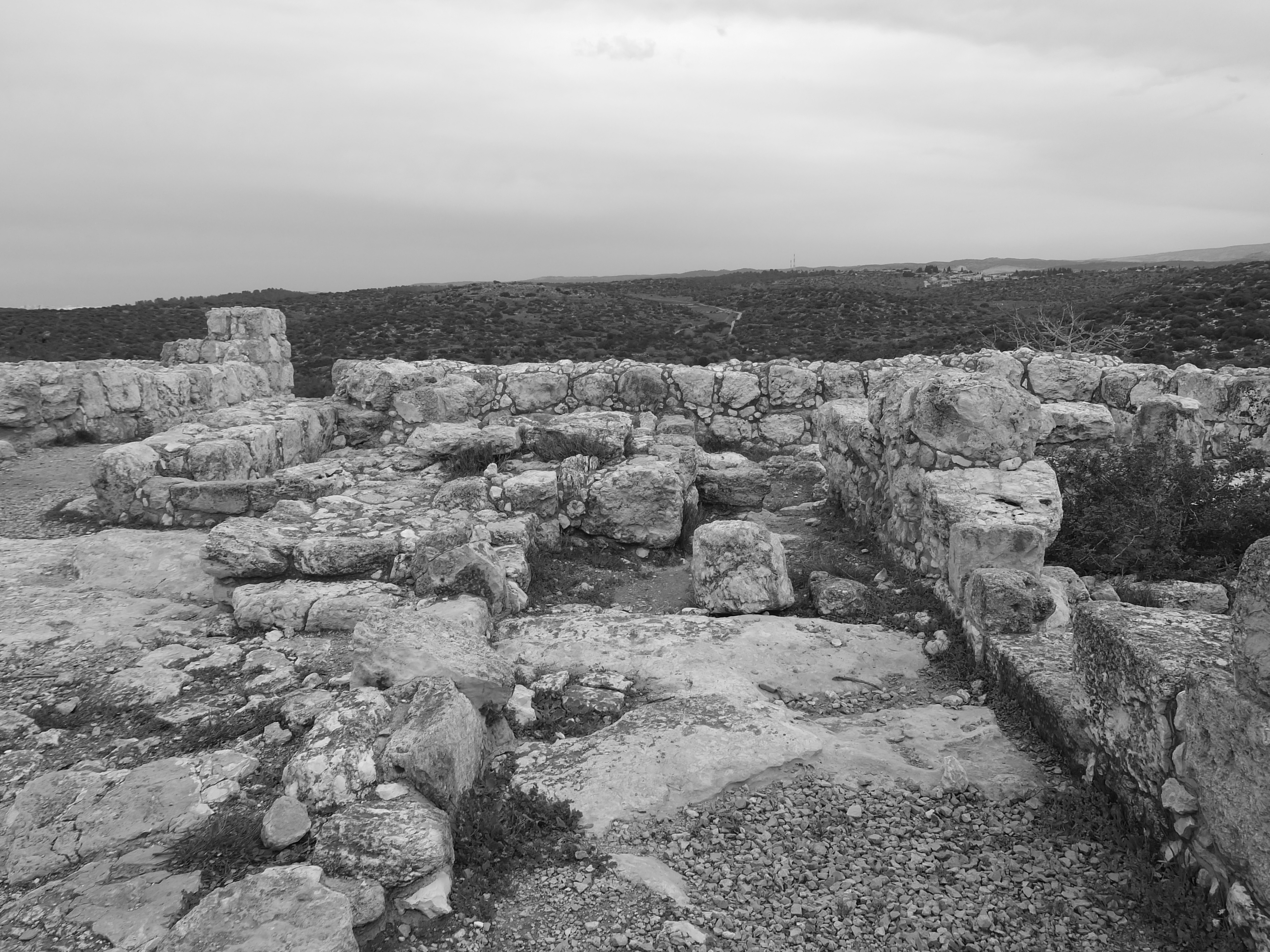
Black & white photograph of ruins in Hurvat Itri, Judean mountains

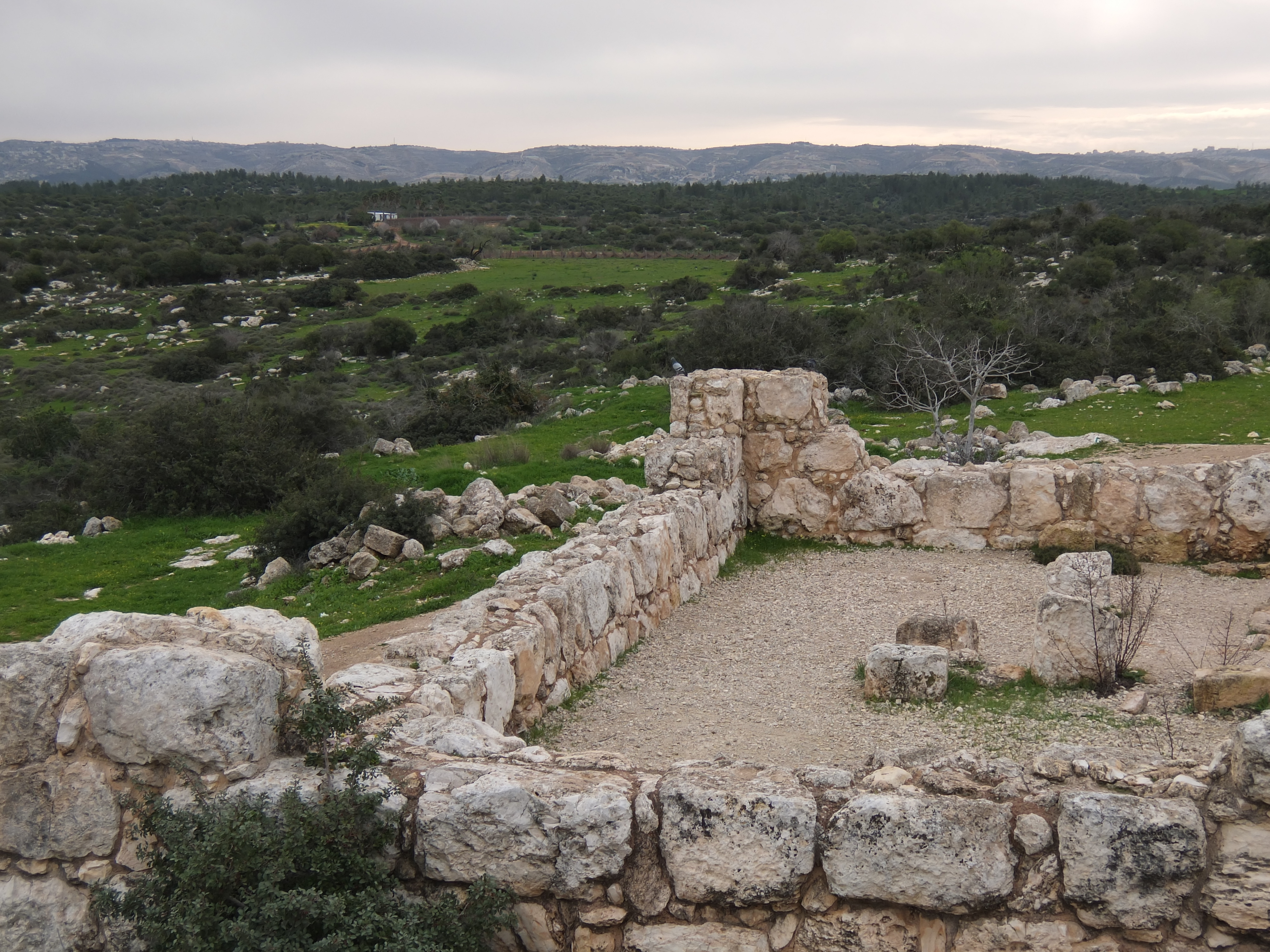
View of Itri ruins

== See also ==
- Adullam Grove Nature Reserve
- Horvat Burgin - nearby ruin with similar history
- Horvat Midras - nearby ruin with similar history
