= Adullam Grove Nature Reserve =

Nature reserve in central Israel

- שמורת טבע חורש עדולם
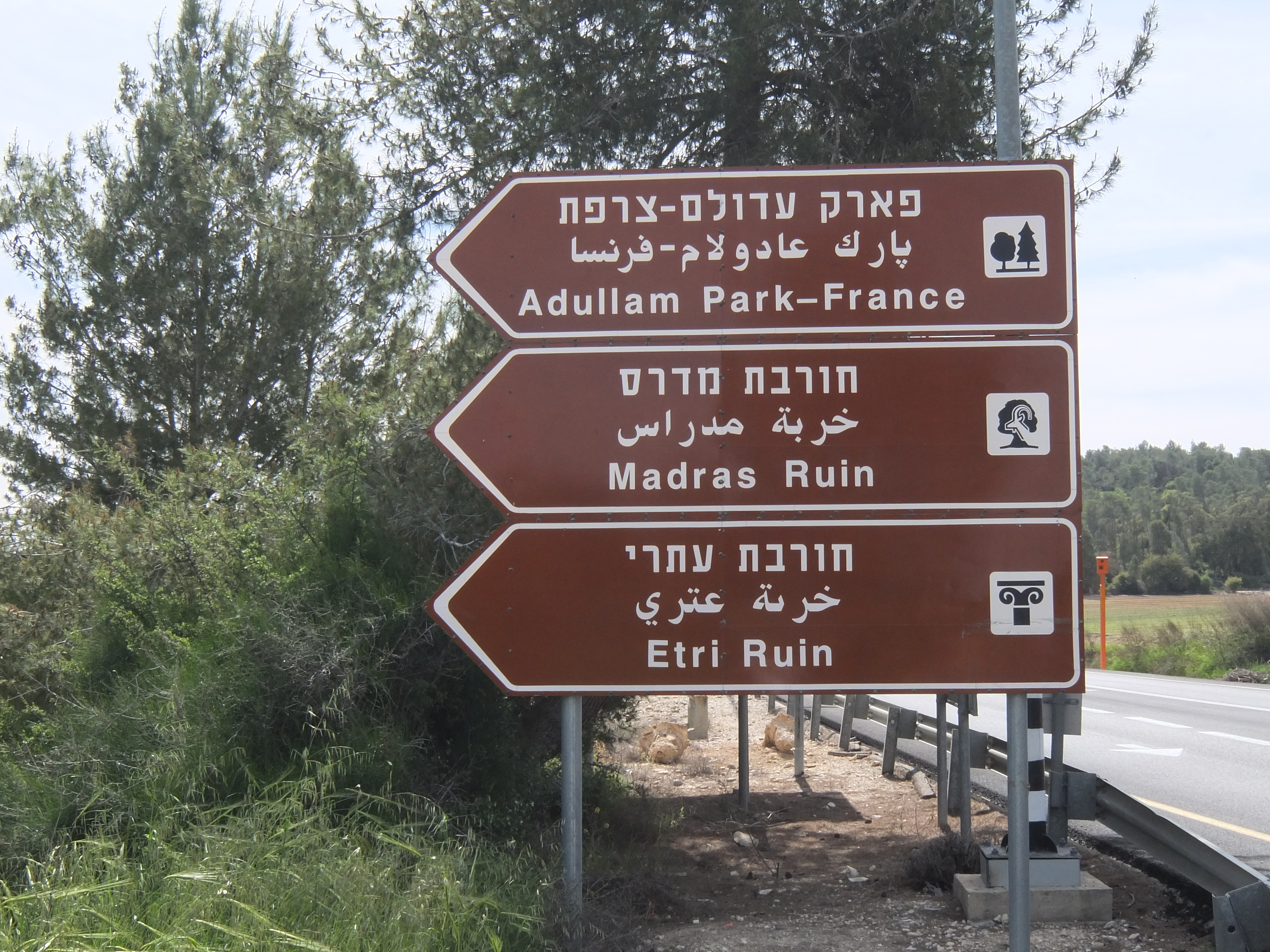
- Interactive map of Adullam Grove Nature Reserve
- Location: Central Israel
- Nearest city: Beit Shemesh
- Coordinates: 31.6522848°N 34.95609°E
- Area: 6,532 dunams (6.532 km^{2}; 2.522 sq mi)
- Established: 1994

Adullam Grove Nature Reserve (Hebrew: שמורת טבע חורש עדולם) is a nature reserve in central Israel, south of Beit Shemesh, managed by the Israel Nature and National Parks Protection Authority.

The park is full with archaeological sites, including a number of ruins of rural villages with findings from the late Second Temple period and the Jewish–Roman wars, Byzantine-period Christian churches, as well as remains from earlier and later times.

== Nature reserve ==
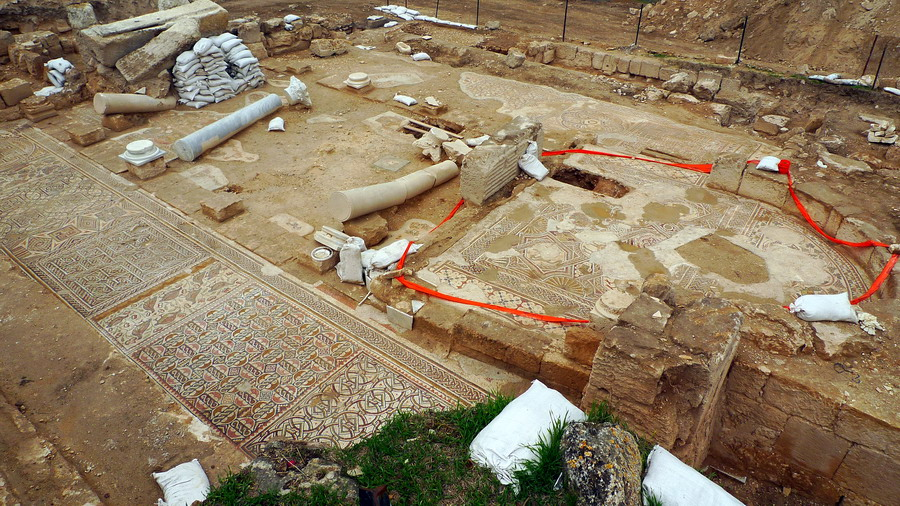
Ruins of Byzantine church, Khirbet Midras, 2010

The reserve was established in 1994, covering 5,380 dunams (5.38 km^{2}; 2.08 sq mi) and was extended to include another 1,152 dunams (1.152 km^{2}; 0.445 sq mi) in 2004. The reserve was declared in order to protect Mediterranean forests, woodlands, and scrub that grow naturally in the area.

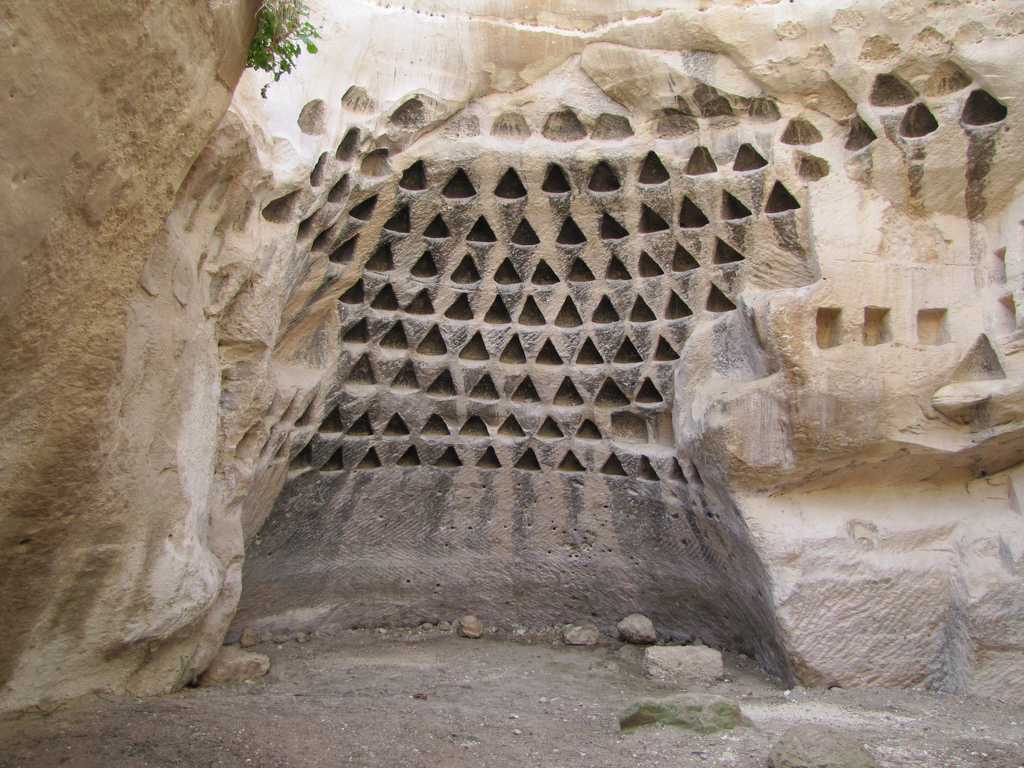
Colombarium at Hurvat Midras

== Archaeology ==
Horvat Midras (Hebrew) or Khirbet Midras (Arabic), sometimes spelled Madras, dated to the 10th century BCE until approximately the 4th century CE, is located within the boundaries of the reserve. Burial caves, hiding tunnels and caves used during the Bar Kokhba revolt in 132-135 CE, a columbarium, and a burial pyramid were discovered at the site.

Horvat 'Ethri - remains of a partially restored Jewish village from the Second Temple period and the Bar Kokhba revolt, containing mikvehs, a synagogue, wine presses, and burial caves.

Hurvat Borgyn - remains of a 2nd-century CE settlement, including fortifications, wells, burial caves, a wine press, and other agriculture oriented finds.

Hurvat Lavnin (Kh. Tell el-Beida) - remains of an ancient settlement, Potsherds and coins discovered indicate that it was inhabited from the Iron Age through the early Roman period, the Bar Kokhba revolt and the Byzantine period. The site features four hiding complexes typical of early Roman period Judaea, as well as burial caves dating from the Late Bronze and Iron Ages.

== Flora and fauna ==
Flora include Buckthorn trees (Rhamnus palaestinus), Oak trees, Greek Strawberry trees, Pistacia lentiscus trees, and various types of Cistus and Hyssop.

== See also ==
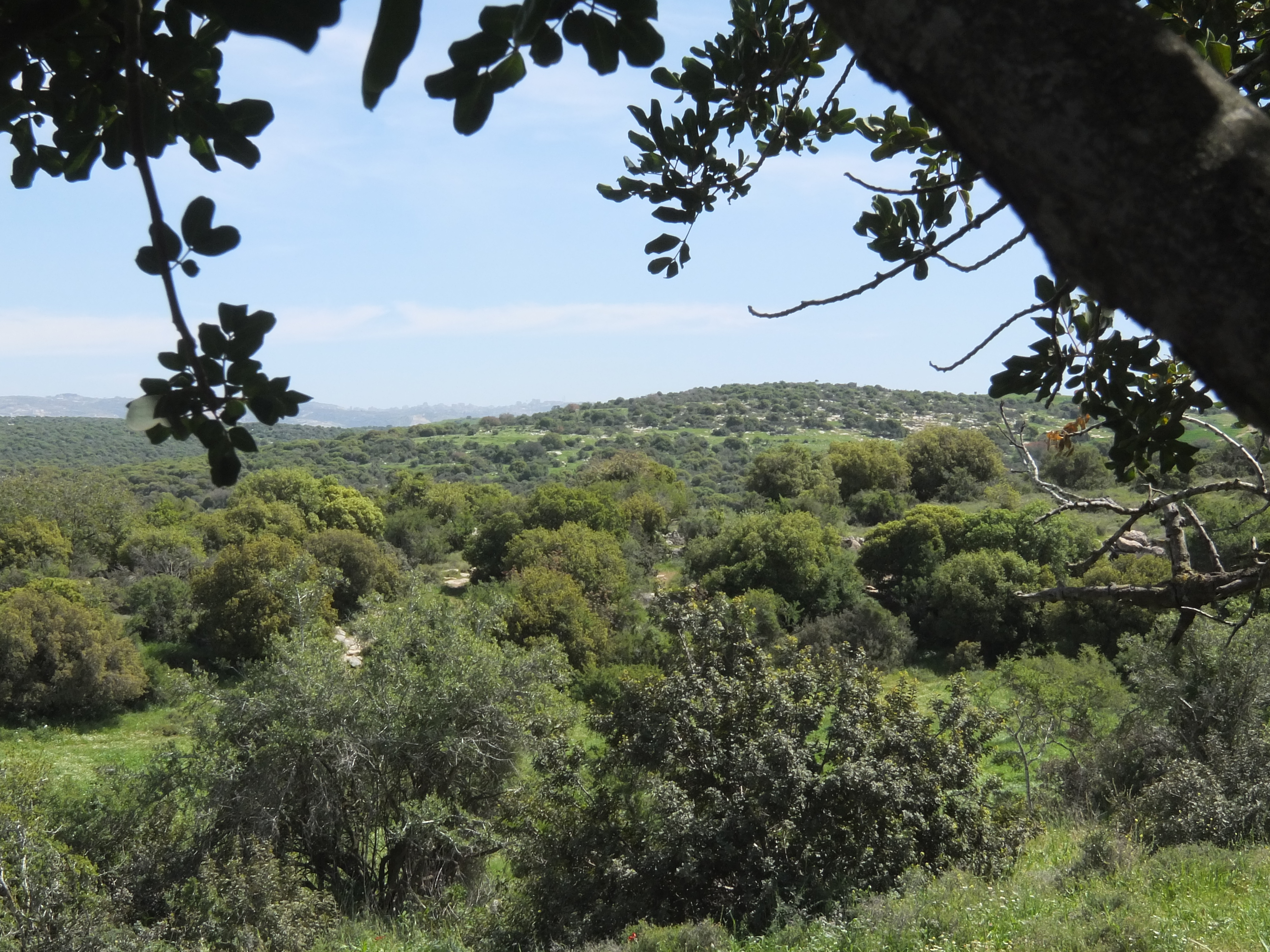
General landscape of the Adullam-France Park in Israel

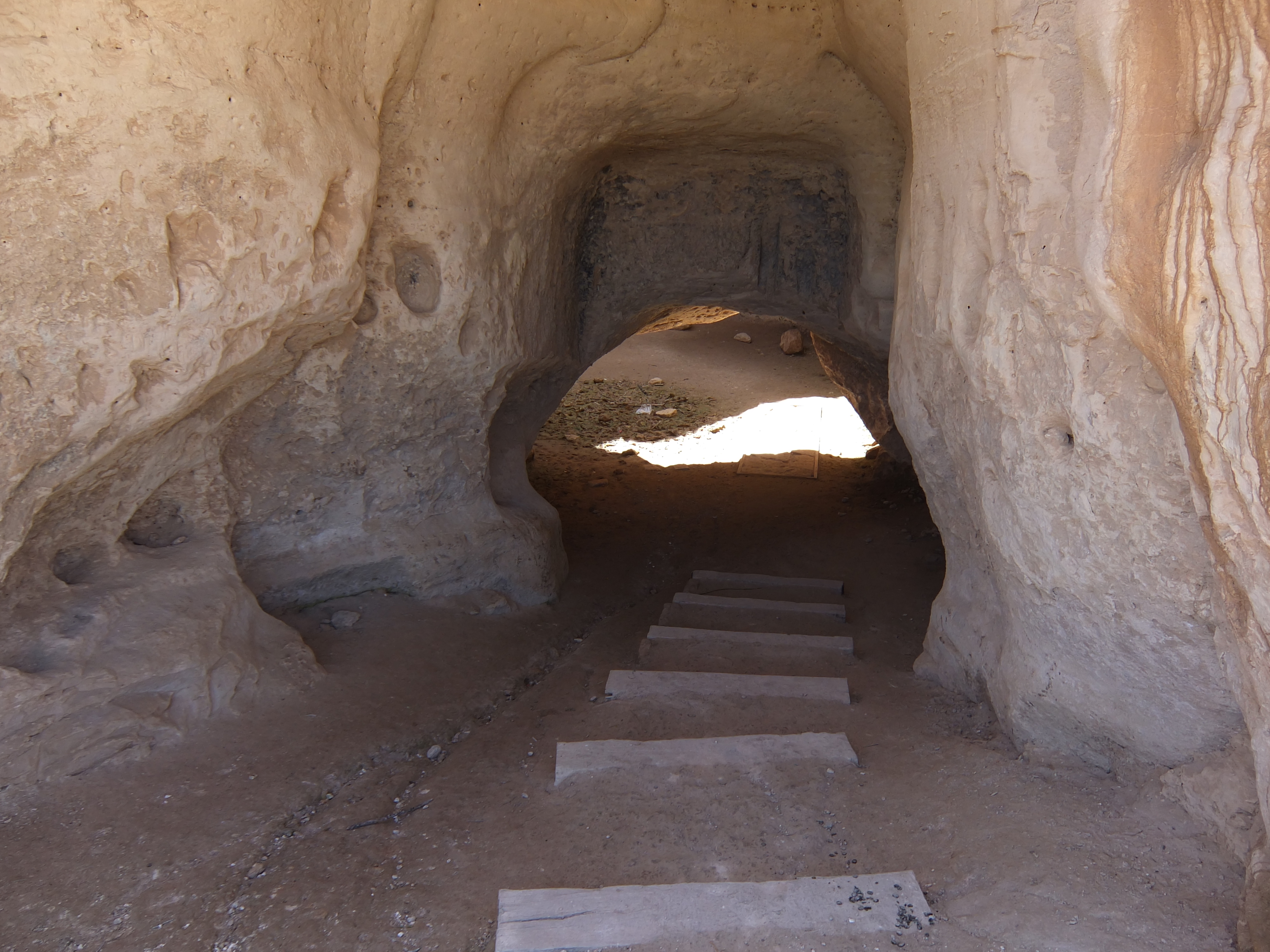
The entrance to a dovecote (columbarium) in the Midras Ruin

- Adullam
- Cave of Adullam
