= Levi Rahmani =

Israeli archeologist

Levi Yizhaq Rahmani (Hebrew: לוי יצחק רחמני; 20 August 1919 – 3 September 2013) was an Israeli archeologist and Chief Curator of Israel Antiquities Authority, and notable for his work on tombs, ossuaries and ossilegia (bone gatherings) in the Second Temple period. Ossuaries are generally catalogued as "Rahmani no. 9", etc., following the numbering in Rahmani's 1994 catalogue.

Born Leopold Steinlauf in Switzerland, Rahmani grew up in Frankfurt am Main in Germany until his family moved to Tel-Aviv in 1933.

Rahmani's work includes explanations of why sometimes iron nails were found in some tombs - unrelated to Roman crucifixion nails, and the earlier dating of tombs.

== Works ==
- L. Y. Rahmani, Ossuaries and Bone-Gathering in the Late Second Temple Period, Qad 1 1 (1978) 102-1 12, figs. (Hebrew).
- L. Y. Rahmani, Roman Tombs in Shmuel HaNavi Street, Jerusalem, IEJ 10(1960) 140-149.
- L. Y. Rahmani, Jewish Tombs in the Romema...
- L. Y. Rahmani, The Decoration on Jewish Ossuaries as Representation of Jerusalem's Tombs (unpublished English abstract of doctoral dissertation in Hebrew, Hebrew University, Jerusalem, 1977).
- Papers on the archaeology of Jewish tombs during the Second Temple period, 1958, 1961, 1982a
- "Jason's Tomb," Israel Exploration Journal, 17 (1967).
- Levi Yitzaq Rahmani, A Catalogue of Jewish Ossuaries in the Collections of the State of Israel (Jerusalem: Israel Antiquities Authority, 1994).
