= Mandaic lead rolls =

Mandaic texts incised onto lead sheets

Mandaic lead rolls, sometimes also known as Mandaic amulets or sheets, are a specific term for a writing medium containing incantations in the Mandaic script incised onto lead sheets with a pin. Some Mandaic incantations are found on gold and silver sheets. They are rolled up and then inserted into a metal capsule with loops on it to be worn around the neck on a string or necklace.

== History ==
These metal objects were produced by the Mandaeans, an ethnoreligious group, as protective talismans. Their inscribed texts are related to inscriptions written in ink on earthen ware bowls, the so-called Aramaic incantation bowls. The metal variants, however, can contain much longer texts and are often inscribed on several lead sheets with catch-lines to indicate the continuation of the text onto the next sheet. The lead rolls date to Late Antiquity (3rd–5th centuries CE) with their textual forerunners going back to the Late Parthian period and originate from Iraq (Central and South Iraq) and Iran (Khuzestan). Major established sites of finds are al-Qurnah, Kish, Seleucia (Sittacene), Ctesiphon, with the first to be discovered in graves 1853 by John George Taylor in Abu Shudhr just north of the Shatt al-Arab and copied by Henry Creswicke Rawlinson. It was followed nearly sixty years later by the publication of an exemplary specimen in 1909. Most of the objects came and still come through illicit antiquities trade.

== Mesopotamian heritage ==
Very specific for Mandaic lead rolls are magical stories created by learned Mandaean writers. These form a new text genre for Aramaic (historiolas), which have a forerunner in the Aramaic Uruk incantation written in a very Late Babylonian cuneiform (c. 150 BC).

Such Mandaic magical texts often transmit insights on the afterlife and cults of Late Babylonian gods (Bēl, Birqa of Guzana, Nabu, Nerig/Nergal, Shamash, Sin), goddesses (Mullissu, Mammitu, Ishtar/Delibat = Δελεφατ), and deities of Iranian origin (Anahid, Danish/Danḥish, Ispandarmid = Spenta Armaiti), as well as demons (Lilith, Dew, Shedu). A recently translated lead amulet was bought in Jerusalem.

== Collections ==
Today, Mandaic lead rolls are held in various collections around the world, including the British Museum, Kelsey Museum of Archaeology, and Schøyen Collection.

== Modern artefacts ==
In Ahvaz, Iran, there is a copy of the Mandaean Book of John with Mandaic text inscribed on lead plates. Originally belonging to Abdullah Khaffagi, it was seen by Jorunn Jacobsen Buckley in 1973.

== Literature ==
- Francis Dietrich (1854). "The Inscription of Abushadhr", Appendix apud Christian C.J. Bunsen, Outlines of the Philosophy of Universal History, Applied to Language and Religion, 2. London, pp. 360-374, pl. 1.
- François Lenormant (1872). Essai sur la propagation de l'alphabet phénicien dans l'ancien monde. Paris.
- Mark Lidzbarski (1909). "Ein mandäisches Amulett," in Florilegium ou recueil de travaux d'érudition dédiés à Monsieur le Marquis Melchior de Vogüé. Paris, pp. 349–373.
- Franz Rosenthal (1939). "Das Mandäische," in Die aramaistische Forschung seit Th. Nöldeke's Veröffentlichungen. Leiden, pp. 224–254.
- Rudolf Macuch (1967). "Altmandäische Bleirollen (Erster Teil)," in Franz Altheim and Ruth Stiehl (eds.), Die Araber in der Alten Welt, Vol. 4. Berlin, pp. 91–203.
- Rudolf Macuch (1968). "Altmandäische Bleirollen," in Franz Altheim and Ruth Stiehl (eds.), Die Araber in der Alten Welt, Vol. 5. Berlin, pp. 91–203.
- André Caquot (1972). "Un phylactère mandéen en plomb." Semitica 22: 67–87.
- Edmond Sollberger (1972). "Mr. Taylor in Chaldea." Anatolien Studies 22: 131–134.
- Joseph Naveh (1975). "Another Mandaic Lead Roll, in Israel Oriental Society 5: 47–53.
- Francesco Franco (1985). "A Mandaic Lead Fragment from Tell Baruda (Coche)." Mesopotamia 17: 147–150.
- Jonas C. Greenfield and Joseph Naveh (1985). "A Mandaic Lead Amulet with Four Incantations [Hebrew]." Eretz-Israel 18: 97-107, pls. 21–22.
- Christa Müller-Kessler (1996). "The Story of Bguzan-Lilit, Daughter of Zanay-Lilit." Journal of the American Oriental Society 116: 185–195.
- Christa Müller-Kessler (1998). "Aramäische Koine. Ein Beschwörungsformular aus Mesopotamien." Baghdader Mitteilungen 29: 331–348.
- Christa Müller-Kessler (1998). "A Mandaic Gold Amulet in the British Museum." Bulletin of the American Schools of Oriental Research 311: 83–88.
- Christa Müller-Kessler (1999). "Aramäische Beschwörungen und astronomische Omina in nachbabylonischer Zeit. Das Fortleben mesopotamischer Kultur im Vorderen Orient." In Johannes Renger (ed.). Babylon: Focus Mesopotamischer Geschichte, Wiege früher Gelehrsamkeit, Mythos in der Moderne (Colloquium der Deutschen Orient-Gesellschaft 2). Berlin, pp. 427-443. ISBN 3-930843-54-4
- Christa Müller-Kessler (1999). "Interrelations between Mandaic Lead Rolls and Incantation Bowls." In Tzvi Abusch and Karel van der Toorn (eds.). Mesopotamian Magic: Textual, Historical, and Interpretative Perspectives (Ancient Magic and Divination 1) Groningen, pp. 197-209. ISBN 90 5693 033 8
- Christa Müller-Kessler and Karlheinz Kessler (1999). "Spätbabylonische Gottheiten in spätantiken mandäischen Texten." Zeitschrift für Assyriologie 89: 65-87.
- Christa Müller-Kessler (1999). "Dämon + YTB ‘L — Ein Krankheitsdämon. Eine Studie zu aramäischen Beschwörungen medizinischen Inhalts." In Barbara Böck, Eva Cancik-Kirschbaum, Thomas Richter (eds.). Munuscula Mesopotamica. Festschrift für Johannes Renger (Alter Orient und Altes Testament 267) Münster, pp. 341–354. ISBN 3-927120-81-2
- Christa Müller-Kessler (2000). "Dan(ḥ)iš – Gott und Dämon." In Joachim Marzahn and Hans Neumann (eds.). Assyriologica et Semitica. Festschrift für Joachim Oelsner anläßlich seines 65. Geburtstages (Alter Orient und Altes Testament 252) Münster, pp. 311–318. ISBN 3-927120-62-6
- Christa Müller-Kessler (2000/01). "Phraseology in Mandaic Incantations and its Rendering in Various Eastern Aramaic Dialects: A Collection of Magic Terminology. Aram 11/12: 293-310.
- Christa Müller-Kessler (2001/02). "Die Zauberschalensammlung des British Museum." Archiv für Orientforschung 48/49: 115–145.
- Christa Müller-Kessler (2001). "Lilit(s) in der aramäisch-magischen Literatur der Spätantike." Altorientalische Forschungen 28: 338–352.
- Christa Müller-Kessler (2002). "Die aramäische Beschwörung und ihre Rezeption in den mandäisch-magischen Texten am Beispiel ausgewählter aramäischer Beschwörungsformulare." In Rika Gyselen (ed.). Charmes et sortilèges, magie et magiciens (Res Orientales XIV). Louvain, pp. 193-208. ISBN 9782950826688
- Christa Müller-Kessler (2002). "A Charm against Demons of Time." In Cornelia Wunsch (ed.). Mining the Archives: Festschrift Christopher Walker on the Occasion of his 60th Birthday (Babylonische Archive 1). Dresden, pp. 183–189. ISBN 3980846601
- Christa Müller-Kessler (2002). "Jüdische und gnostische Beschwörungen medizinischen Inhalts aus der Spätantike des Ostens." In Axel Karenberg und Christian Leitz (eds.). Heilkunde und Hochkultur II. “Magie und Medizin” und “Der alte Mensch” in den antiken Zivilisationen des Mittelmeerraumes (Naturwissenschaft – Philosophie – Geschichte 16). Münster, pp. 183–208. ISBN 3-8258-5752-2
- Christa Müller-Kessler (2004). "The Mandaeans and the Question of Their Origin." ARAM 16: 47–60.
- Karlheinz Kessler (2008). "Das wahre Ende Babyloniens — Die Tradition der Aramäer, Mandäer, Juden und Manichäer." In Joachim Marzahn and Günther Schauerte (eds.). Babylon. Mythos und Wahrheit. München, pp. 467–486. ISBN 978-3-7774-4295-2
- Christa Müller-Kessler (2010). "A Mandaic Lead Roll in the Collection of the Kelsey Museum, Michigan: Fighting the Evil Entities of Death." ARAM 22: 477–493.
- Christa Müller-Kessler (2012). "More on Puzzling Words and Spellings in Aramaic Magic Bowls and Related Texts." Bulletin of the School of Oriental and African Studies 75: 1-31.
- Christa Müller-Kessler (2017). "Zauberschalen und ihre Umwelt. Ein Überblick über das Schreibmedium Zauberschale. In Jens Kamran, Rolf Schäfer, Markus Witte (eds.). Zauber und Magie im antiken Palästina und in seiner Umwelt (Abhandlungen des Deutschen Palästina-Vereins 46) Wiesbaden, pp. 59–94, pls. 1–8. ISBN 978-3-447-10781-5
- Christa Müller-Kessler (2018). "Šamaš, Sîn (Sahra, Sira), Delibat (Ištar, al-‘Uzzā), und Kēwān (Kajjamānu) in den frühen mandäischen magischen Texten und bei ihren Nachbarn. Eine Bestandsaufnahme." ISIMU 20/21: 259–295.

== See also ==
- Curse tablet
- Execration texts
- Incantation bowl
- Ketef Hinnom scrolls
- List of Mandaic manuscripts
- Demons in Mandaeism
- Pella curse tablet
