= Yavne-Yam ostracon =

Ancient Hebrew inscription

Mesad Hashavyahu ostracon
- המכתב ממצד חשביהו
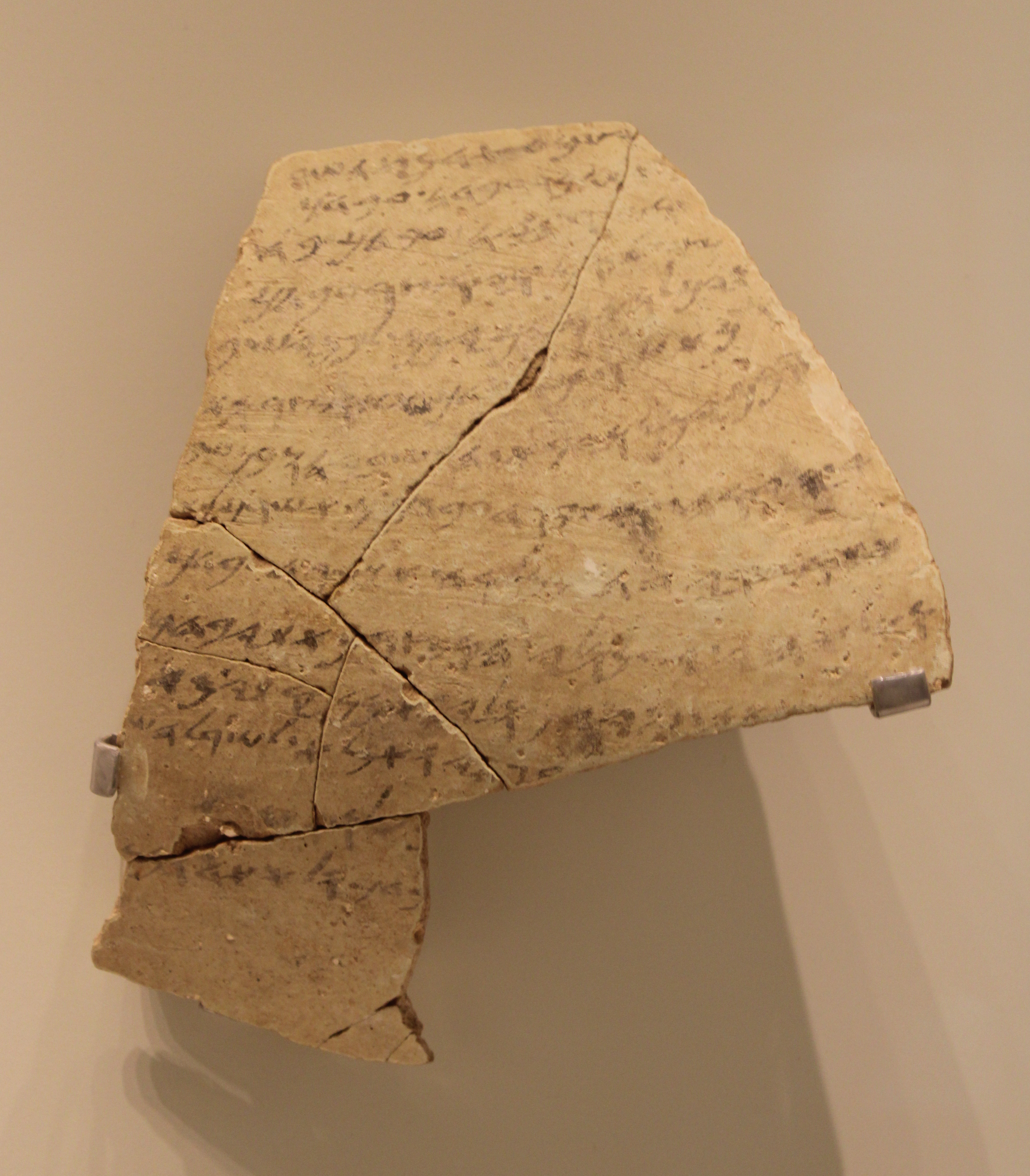
- Type: Ostracon
- Material: Earthenware; Ink
- Height: 20 centimetres (7.9 in)
- Width: 16.5 centimetres (6.5 in)
- Writing: Paleo-Hebrew
- Created: 7th century BC
- Discovered: 1960; Mesad Hashavyahu
- Discovered by: Joseph Naveh
- Present location: Israel Museum, Jerusalem
- Culture: Israelites

The Yavne-Yam ostracon (Hebrew: האוסטרקון מיבנה-ים), also known as the Mesad Hashavyahu ostracon (Hebrew: המכתב ממצד חשביהו), is an ostracon discovered in 1960 by Joseph Naveh at Mesad Hashavyahu, near Yavne-Yam, Israel. The artifact contains a written appeal, in the Hebrew language using the Paleo-Hebrew alphabet, by a field worker to the fortress's governor regarding the confiscation of his cloak, which the writer considers unjust. The inscription is cataloged as KAI 200.

The ostracon was found under the floor of a room adjacent to the guardhouse/gate complex, is approximately 20 cm high by 16.5 cm wide, and contains 14 visible lines of text. In all, seven key artifacts were recovered, six of them inscribed ostraca in the Hebrew language. Pottery shards in the layer above represented Greek (early Ionian or Southwest Anatolian) or Persian period. The ostraca from this site are currently located in the Israel Museum at Jerusalem.

== Background ==
Concerning who was in control of this area of the Philistine Plain, Shmuel Ahituv stated, "The letter is written in clear Paleo-Hebrew, plus a possible scribal omission here or there, and the script is that of a trained scribe. The work supervisor mentioned in the text bears a clearly Judaean name, Hoshavyahu. All these factors point to a time of Judaean control over the area." Naveh agrees, "The four Hebrew inscriptions together testify to this fortress having been under Judaean control at the time. ... It seems likely that Josiah placed a military governor in charge of the fortress, and that the force garrisoned there was supplied with provisions by the peasants living in the unwalled settlements in the vicinity."

== Content ==
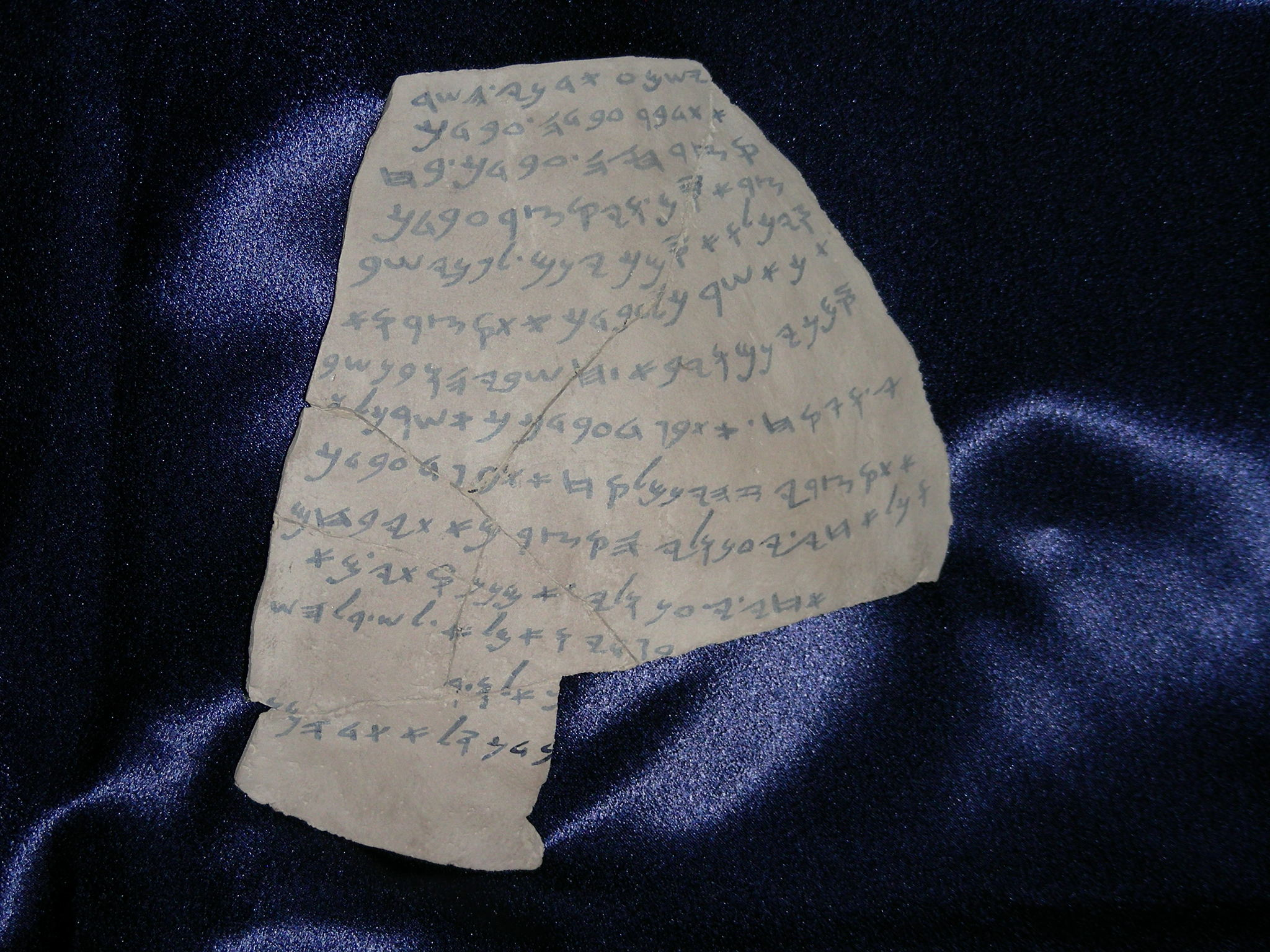
Ostracon replica

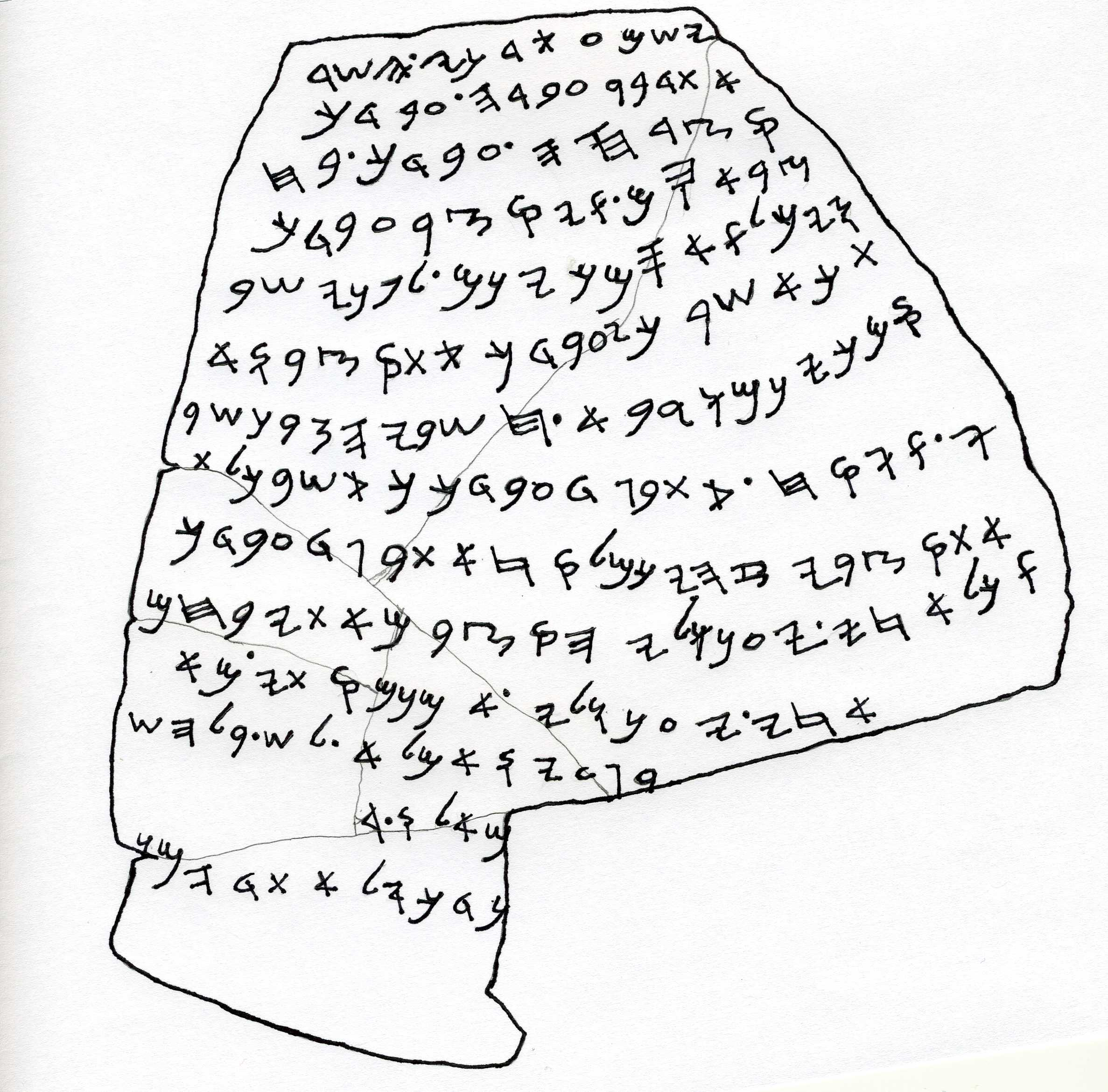
Script tracing
𐤉𐤔𐤌𐤏 𐤀𐤃𐤍𐤉 𐤄𐤔𐤓

𐤀𐤕 𐤃𐤁𐤓 𐤏𐤁𐤃𐤄. 𐤏𐤁𐤃𐤊 𐤒𐤑𐤓. 𐤄𐤉𐤄. 𐤏𐤁𐤃𐤊. 𐤁𐤇 𐤑𐤓 𐤀𐤎𐤌. 𐤅𐤉𐤒𐤑𐤓 𐤏𐤁𐤃𐤊 𐤅𐤉𐤊𐤋 𐤅𐤀𐤎𐤌 𐤊𐤉𐤌𐤌. 𐤋𐤐𐤍𐤉 𐤔𐤁 𐤕 𐤊𐤀𐤔𐤓 𐤊𐤋 {𐤏}𐤁𐤃𐤊 𐤀𐤕 𐤒𐤑𐤓 𐤅𐤀 𐤎𐤌 𐤊𐤉𐤌𐤌 𐤅𐤉𐤁𐤀 𐤄𐤅𐤔𐤏𐤉𐤄𐤅 𐤁𐤍 𐤔𐤁 𐤉. 𐤅𐤉𐤒𐤇. 𐤀𐤕 𐤁𐤂𐤃 𐤏𐤁𐤃𐤊 𐤊𐤀𐤔𐤓 𐤊𐤋𐤕 𐤀𐤕 𐤒𐤑𐤓𐤉 𐤆𐤄 𐤉𐤌𐤌 𐤋𐤒𐤇 𐤀𐤕 𐤁𐤂𐤃 𐤏𐤁𐤃𐤊 𐤅𐤊𐤋 𐤀𐤇𐤉. 𐤉𐤏𐤍𐤅. 𐤋𐤉. 𐤄𐤒𐤑𐤓𐤌 𐤀𐤕𐤉 𐤁𐤇𐤌. {𐤄}𐤔 {𐤌𐤔} 𐤀𐤇𐤉. 𐤉𐤏𐤍𐤅. 𐤋𐤉 𐤀𐤌𐤍 𐤍𐤒𐤕𐤉 𐤌𐤀 {𐤔𐤌}.........𐤁𐤂𐤃𐤉 𐤅𐤀𐤌𐤋𐤀. 𐤋𐤔𐤓 𐤋𐤄𐤔 {𐤉𐤁} ..........𐤏𐤁{𐤃𐤊}.....𐤀𐤋𐤅. 𐤓𐤇

{𐤌𐤌. 𐤅𐤄𐤔}𐤁𐤕 𐤀𐤕 {𐤁𐤂𐤃. 𐤏}𐤁𐤃𐤊 𐤅𐤋𐤀 𐤕𐤃𐤄𐤌 𐤍
yšm‘ ’dny hsr

’t dbr ‘bdh. ‘bdk qṣr. hyh. ‘bdk. bḥ ṣr ’sm. wyqṣr ‘bdk wykl w’sm kymm. lpny šb t k’šr kl {‘}bdk ’t qṣr w’ sm kymm wyb’ hwš‘yhw bn šb y. wyqḥ. ’t bgd ‘bdk k’šr klt ’t qṣry zh ymm lqḥ ’t bgd ‘bdk wkl ’ḥy. y‘nw. ly. hqṣrm ’ty bḥm. {h}š {mš} ’ḥy. y‘nw. ly ’mn nqty m’ {šm}.........bgdy w’ml’. lsr lhš {yb} ..........‘b{dk}.....’lw. rḥ

{mm. whš}bt ’t {bgd. ‘}bdk wl’ tdhm n

—Paleo-Hebrew and romanized text

=== Translation ===
The following is an edited translation of the ostracon, which is composed of fourteen lines in Hebrew:

"Let my lord, the governor, hear the word of his servant! Your servant is a reaper. Your servant was in Hazar Asam, and your servant reaped, and he finished, and he was storing up (the grain) during these days before the Sabbath. When your servant had finished the harvest, and was storing (the grain) during these days, Hoshavyahu came, the son of Shobi, and he seized the garment of your servant, when I had finished my harvest. It (is already now some) days (since) he took the garment of your servant. And all my companions can bear witness for me—they who reaped with me in the heat of the harvest—yes, my companions can bear witness for me. Amen! I am innocent from guilt. And he stole my garment! It is for the governor to give back the garment of his servant. So grant him mercy in that you return the garment of your servant and do not be displeased."

Due to breaks in the ostracon and a missing lower right section, Naveh states that there are too few letters available in line 13 to make an educated guess what it said. The same might likely be said of lines 11 through 14, which have been reconstructed, and a line 15 which is missing.

== Analysis ==
The genre of the inscription is the subject of debate, and it was identified by different scholars as a letter, legal document, extrajudicial petition addressed to a king or his subordinate or even as a poem. In the inscription, the worker makes his appeal to the governor on the basis of both the garment's undeserved confiscation and by implication, the biblical law regarding holding past sundown a person's cloak as collateral for a debt (Exodus 22; cf. Deut 24). Although the petition does not specifically cite the law, it would have been commonly known by rulers and peasants alike. Some scholars argue that the ostracon bears the first known extra-Biblical reference to the Sabbath, but the issue is debated.

== See also ==
- Canaanite and Aramaic inscriptions
