= Khirbet Beit Lei graffiti =

Seven inscriptions in Hebrew found in Israel

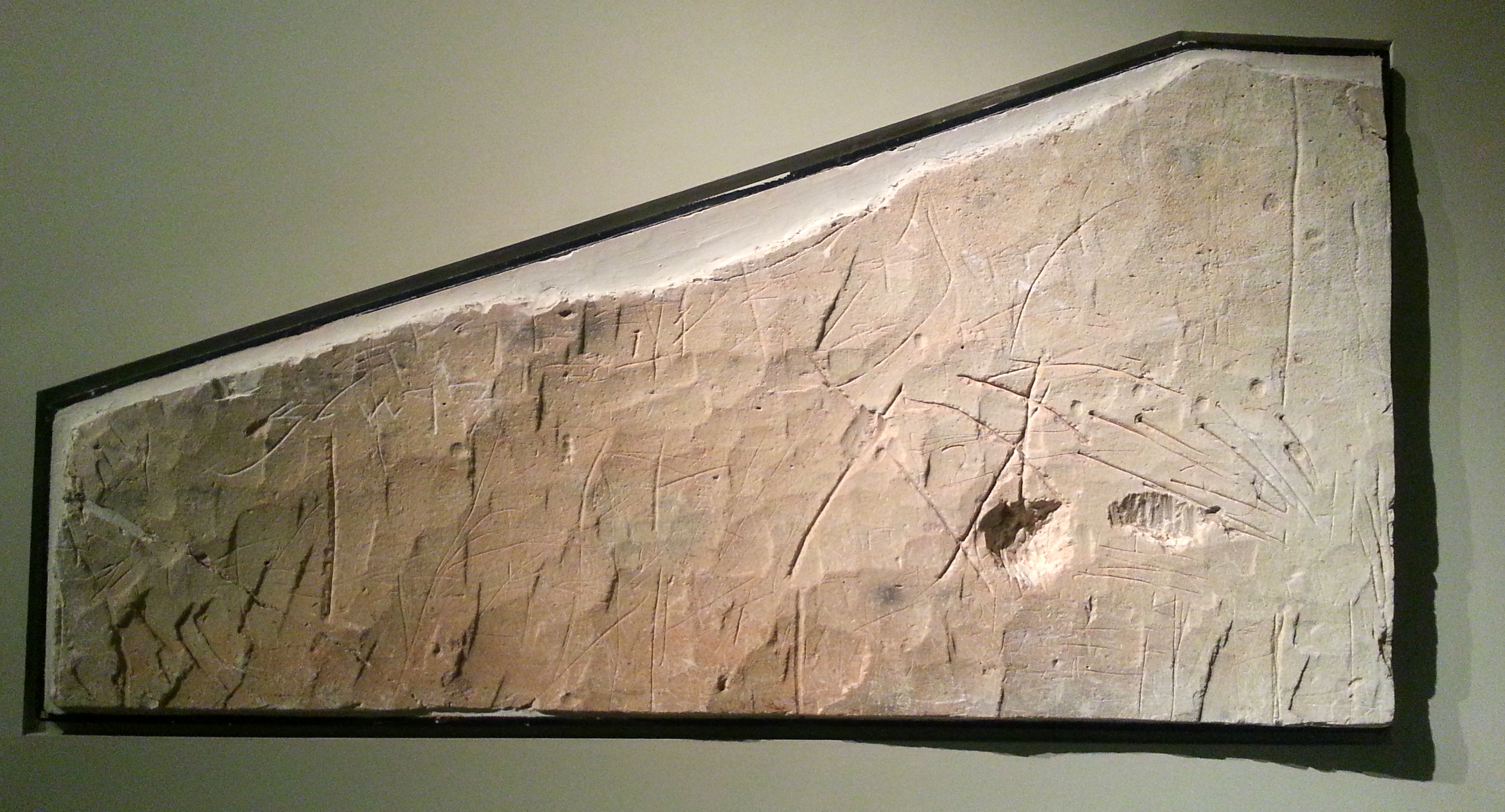
Inscription A, from the Israel Museum

The Khirbet Beit Lei graffiti are seven inscriptions in Hebrew in various states of preservation found in the excavations at Khirbet Beit Lei.

Of particular interest is one inscription containing a very early appearance in Hebrew of the name ירשלם (Jerusalem).

== Interpretation ==
There is disagreement about how they should be read. It appears that the words YHWH (Yahweh) and YRŠLM (Jerusalem) feature in the inscriptions, which Joseph Naveh dated to the late 6th century BCE.

Naveh read it as

𐤉𐤄𐤅𐤄 𐤀𐤋𐤄𐤉 𐤊𐤋 𐤄𐤀𐤓𐤑 𐤄𐤓𐤉 𐤉𐤄𐤃 𐤋𐤅 𐤋𐤀𐤋𐤄𐤉 𐤉𐤓𐤔𐤋𐤌
yhwh ʾlhy kl hʾrṣ hry yhd lw lʾlhy yršlm

which he translated as "Yahweh (is) the God of the whole earth; the mountains of Judah belong to him, to the God of Jerusalem". An earlier example of the name appears in a papyrus from the 7th century BCE.

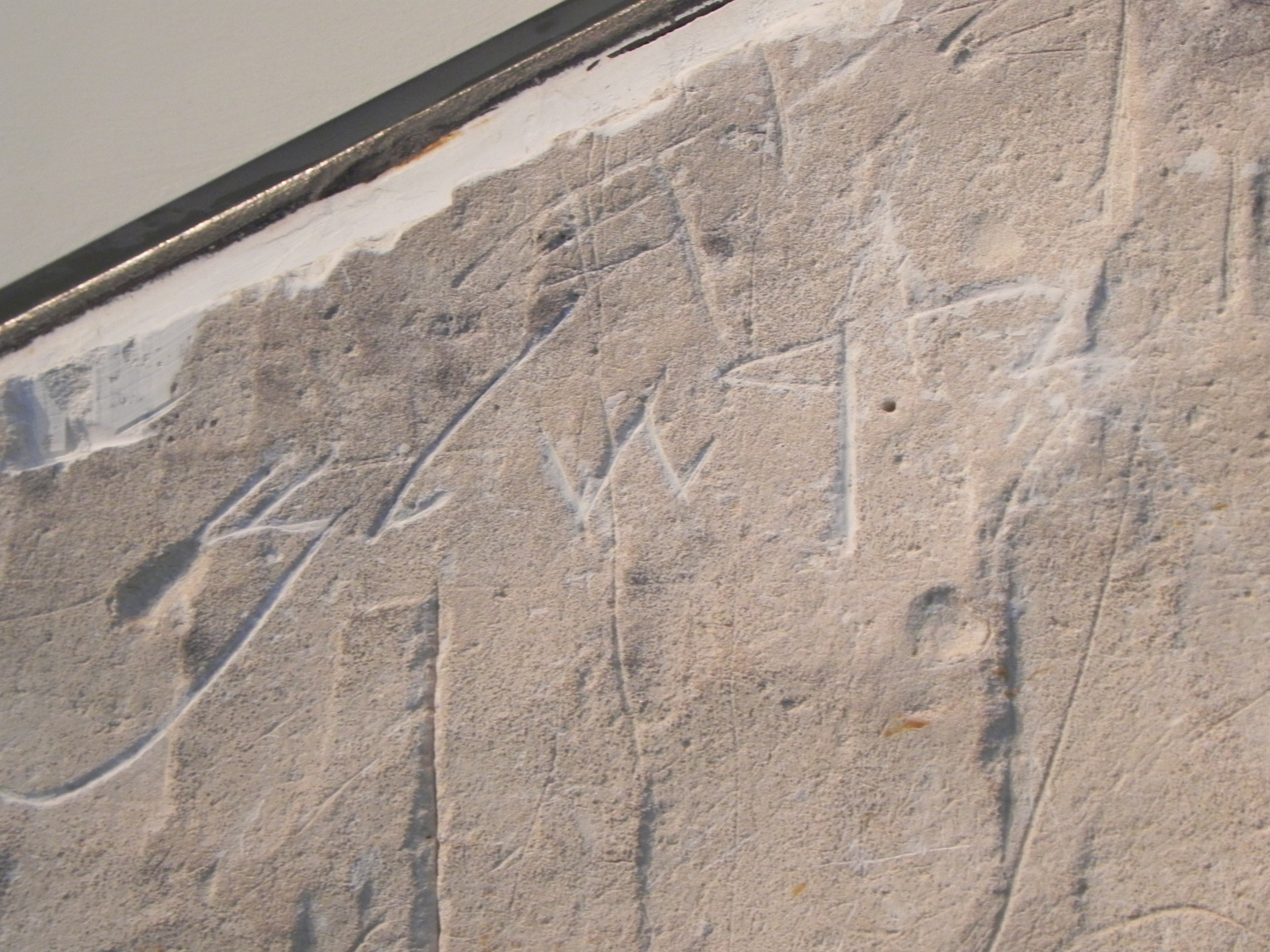
Close up of the word 𐤉𐤓𐤔𐤋𐤌 "Jerusalem" on the Khirbet Beit Lei inscription

Frank Moore Cross disagreed with many of Naveh's readings of the letters, instead interpreting the inscription as a poetic rubric in the first person: "I am Yahweh thy God: I will accept the cities of Judah, and will redeem Jerusalem". Cross speculated that it was "the citation of a lost prophecy", perhaps written by a refugee fleeing the 587 BCE destruction of Jerusalem. Naveh later dismissed Cross's reading and stuck to his own version.

Other scholars, including Lemaire and Puech, have proposed additional readings. Patrick D. Miller read it almost the same as Cross did: "[I am] Yahweh your God. I will accept the cities of Judah. I will redeem Jerusalem."
