= Khirbet Beit Lei =

Archaeological site in Israel

- Beit Lei בית ליי
- Ḫirbat Bayt Layy; Beit Loya (בית לויה)
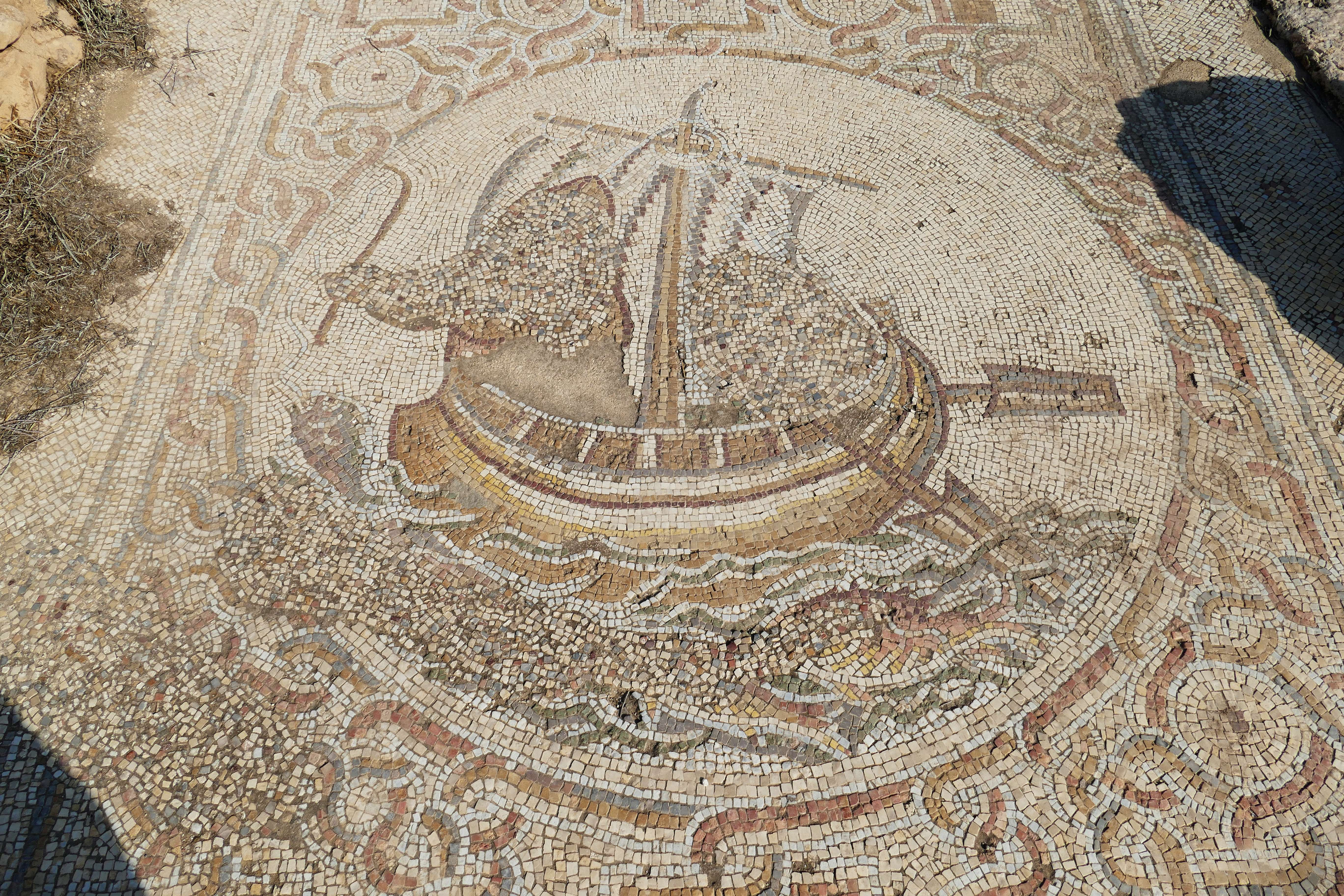
- Mosaic floor of Byzantine church

- Location within Israel
- 31°33′49″N 34°55′42″E
- Periods: Iron Age II - Mamluk period
- Associated with: Judahites, Idumaeans, Jews, Christians, Arabs
- Location: Israel
- Region: Judaean Foothills
- Palestine grid: 14315–40/107975–8100

Site notes
- Height: 400 m (1,300 ft)
- Area: c. 50 dunams

Khirbet Beit Lei (also known as Beth Loya) is an archaeological tell in the Judean Lowlands of Israel. The site preserves remains of a settlement that was occupied across multiple periods, including the Hellenistic and early Roman eras, the Byzantine and early Islamic periods, and the Mamluk period.

Archaeological finds include extensive subterranean complexes, rock-cut installations, and the remains of a Byzantine church featuring intricate mosaics and inscriptions. Excavations reveal a clear cultural and religious transition at the site: an initial Hellenistic-period pagan Idumaean settlement was violently destroyed, likely during the Hasmonean conquest of Idumaea under John Hyrcanus. This destruction layer is followed by evidence of renewed occupation by a Jewish population, marked by the presence of stone vessels, ritual baths (mikva'ot), and olive-oil installations decorated with menorah motifs.

On the site's eastern slope, an Iron Age II burial cave typical of pre-exilic Judah was discovered, containing undisturbed human remains, personal items, and a collection of carved drawings and ancient Hebrew inscriptions. The cave's graffiti include human figures, cultic imagery, and unusual depictions such as sailing vessels. Most significant is a lengthy inscription known as the Khirbet Beit Lei graffiti, which affirms the sovereignty of the God of Israel and includes one of the earliest known Hebrew attestations of the name "Jerusalem".

In Mormon archaeology, the site has been associated with the biblical figure of Prophet Lehi, who is described in Latter-day Saint tradition as having migrated to the New World.

== Geography ==
Khirbet Beit Lei is located in the southern Judean Lowlands (Shephelah), on a natural hill rising to c. 400 m above sea level. It is situated 5.5 kilometers southeast of Beit Guvrin, 8 kilometers east of Tel Lachish, and 12 kilometers north of Tell Beit Mirsim. It covers approximately 50 dunams.

== Iron Age II burial caves ==
Two ancient rock-cut burial caves on the eastern slope of the hill of Khirbet Beit Lei were exposed in 1961 during the construction of a road by the Jewish National Fund. The caves were excavated in 1963 by Israel's Department of Antiquities under Joseph Naveh. One cave consisted of three chambers cut into the chalky limestone. Architecturally, it is a tomb with benches along the walls, typical for the pre-exilic Kingdom of Judah. Eight skeletons lay on limestone ledges around the sides of the chambers, untouched since being laid to rest. A ring, a bronze earring and a bronze plaque were also found in the cave, which contained carved drawings and inscriptions.

Three of the drawings were of human figures: a man holding what might be a lyre, a man raising his arms, possibly in a prayer gesture, and a man wearing a headdress. Two sailing vessels were sketched on another wall. Two other figures may be an encampment and a tent. Archaeologist Joseph Naveh notes that the ship imagery is unexpected in a Judean hill-country tomb and suggests a symbolic or religious meaning. Naveh cautiously suggests that the cave may have belonged to a family of Levite singers, based on the presence of a lyre-playing figure, prayer gestures, and distinctive headgear. Naveh notes that a second nearby burial cave contained skeletal remains and pottery of a different period.

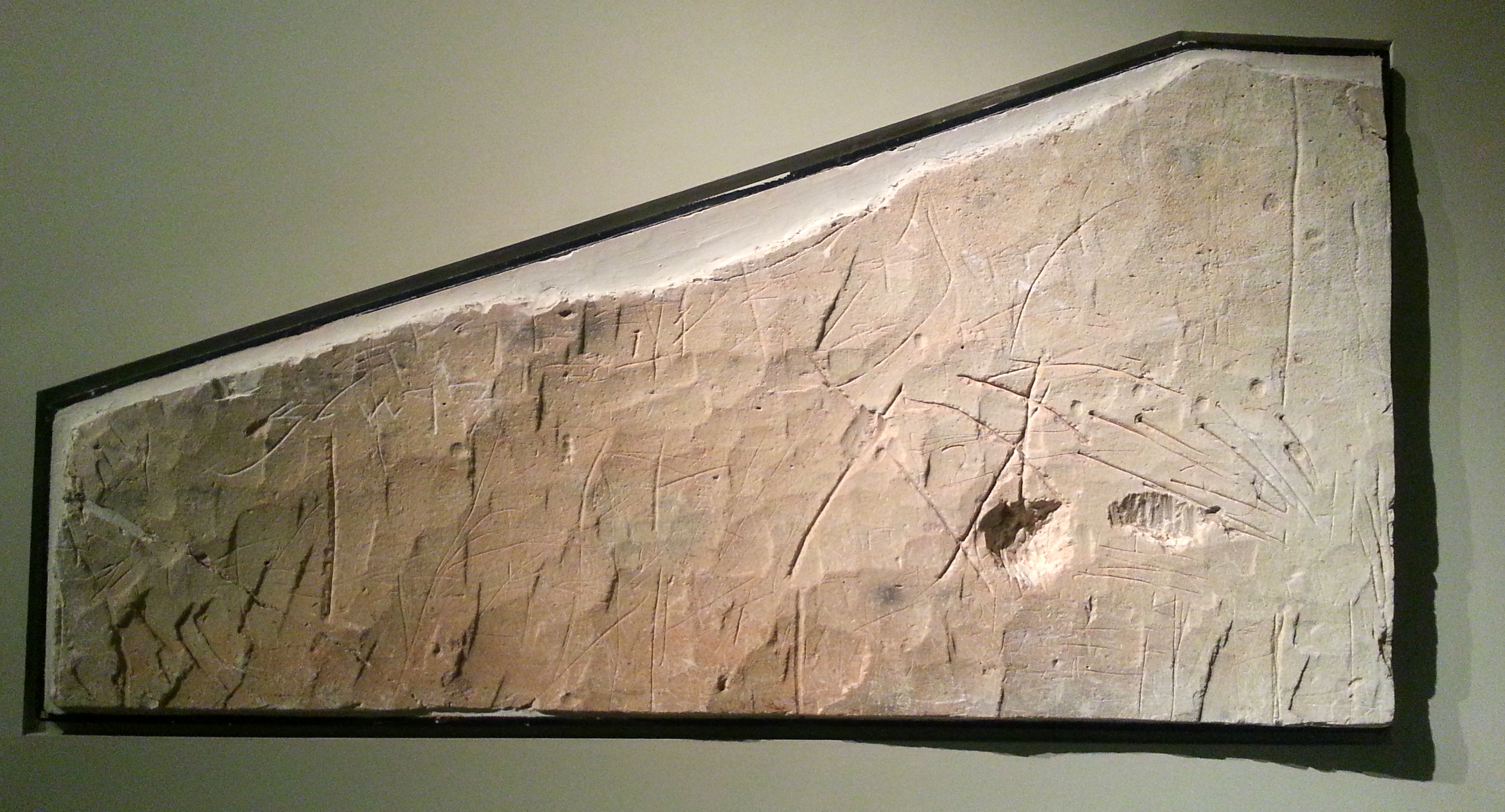
Khirbet Beit Lei Inscription A, from the Israel Museum

The burial cave also contained a concentration of ancient Hebrew inscriptions, in the paleo-Hebrew script, carved into the walls of the antechamber. These were not formal monumental texts but graffiti, indicating spontaneous or situational writing rather than an official commission. The longest and most carefully executed inscription is known as the Khirbet Beit Lei graffiti and was carved at approximately eye level. Naveh reconstructs it as a theological declaration affirming Yahweh's universal sovereignty and his particular association with Judah and Jerusalem. According to this reconstruction, the text reads: "Yahweh is the God of the whole earth; the mountains of Judah belong to him, to the God of Jerusalem." Another reconstruction, suggested by Frank Moore Cross, "I am Yahweh thy God: I will accept the cities of Judah and will redeem Jerusalem."

The site's excavator, Joseph Naveh, tentatively linked the inscriptions and drawings to refugees during a period of national crisis, favoring the Assyrian invasion of Judah under Sennacherib in the late 8th century BCE. In 2016, Alice Mandell and Jeremy D. Smoak challenged this interpretation, arguing that the inscriptions should instead be understood within the funerary context of the tomb. They propose that the inscriptions and drawings functioned as performative and apotropaic markers, defining and protecting the burial space while materially linking the tomb to the domain of Yahweh.

Another inscription was carved just beneath the Jerusalem inscription, and Naveh stressed that its reading is tentative due to interference from unrelated scratch marks. He proposes that the text refers to mount Moriah, noting that the spelling corresponds to the form known from 2 Chronicles rather than Genesis. The last inscription, located higher on the southern wall, is much shorter and is interpreted as a direct plea for deliverance, consisting essentially of an invocation to Yahweh to "deliver" or "save", a formulation that Naveh compares to common biblical expressions of supplication in times of distress.

== Hellenistic and Early Roman periods ==
During the Hellenistic period, in the 3rd and 2nd centuries BCE, the site appears to have been an Idumaean village. Artifacts from this period indicate a polytheistic culture and include figurines, imported Greek ceramics, and Hellenistic coins. The architectural style resembles that of the nearby Idumaean city of Maresha. One of the most prominent structures from this period is a large water reservoir. This phase ended violently, as evidenced by a thick layer of burning discovered at the site. This destruction is attributed to the Hasmonean conquest of Idumaea under John Hyrcanus around 113/112 BCE, during which the local population was forcibly converted to Judaism.

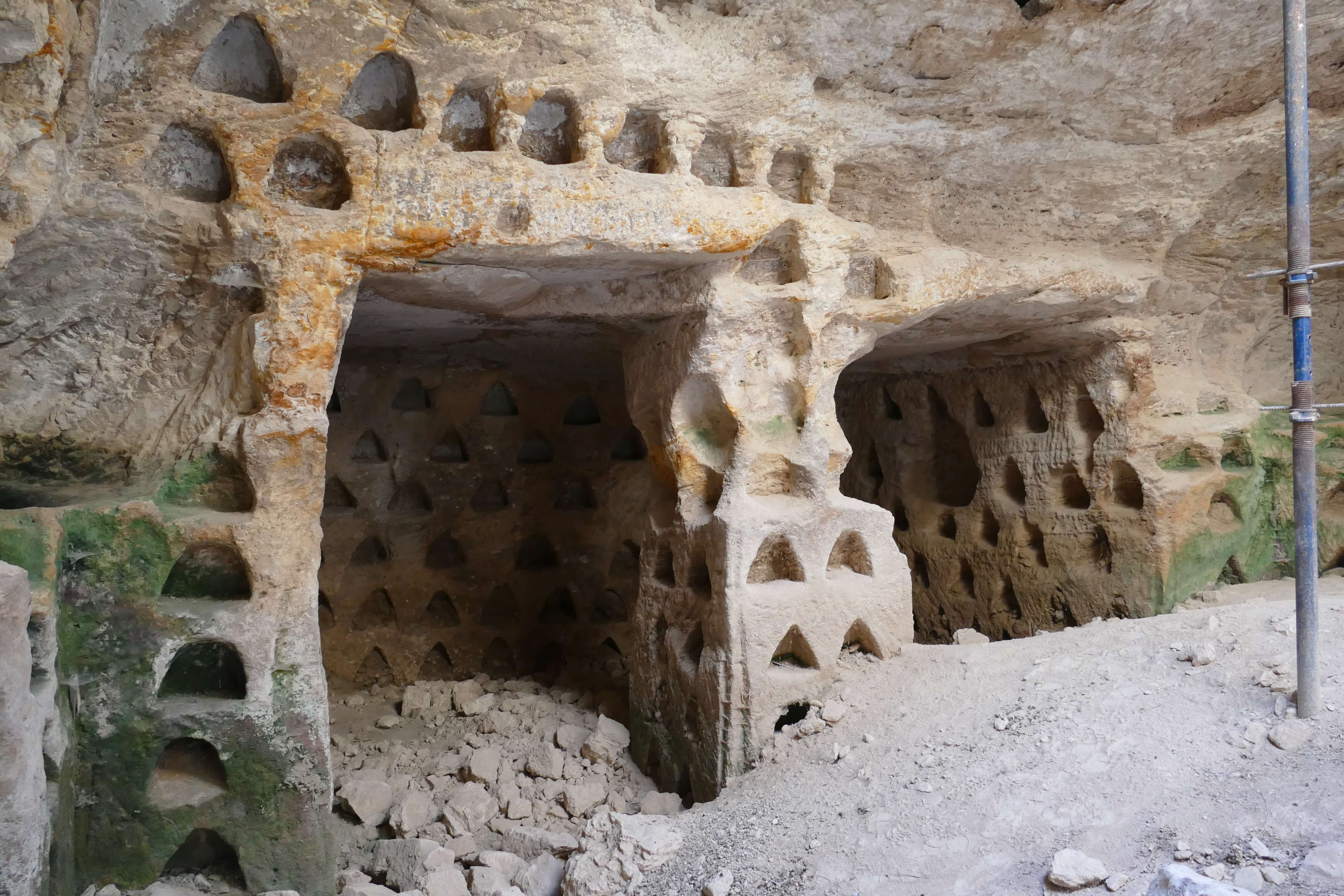
Columbarium at Khirbet Beit Lei

Following the Hasmonean conquest, in the late Second Temple period, the site underwent a dramatic transformation to a Jewish material culture. Figurines and imported vessels disappear, replaced by stone vessels characteristic of Jewish populations of the era, reflecting adherence to Jewish purity laws. Additionally, two Jewish ritual baths, or mikvehs, were uncovered; one features seven steps, and at its bottom, a ceremonial water vessel typical of the late Second Temple period was found. Perhaps the most distinctive discovery is three menorahs carved at the entrance of an underground olive oil production facility. These carvings were found both on the doorpost and the lintel, and are considered among the earliest depictions of menorahs. Their presence in an olive oil installation, along with a niche that was empty of figurines, unlike Idumaean olive oil installations in Maresha, suggests a shift in identity among the local population.

== Byzantine period ==
=== Church complex ===
Khirbet Beit Loya contains the remains of a church constructed around 500 CE. The church was a monoapsidal basilica, consisting of a nave flanked by two aisles separated by rows of columns set on stone stylobates. The columns supported wooden beams rather than stone arcades. An internal apse was located at the eastern end of the nave, with a raised chancel. To the west were an atrium, exonarthex, and narthex, while two pastophoria flanked the apse. Additional architectural elements included a chapel to the north, a baptistery to the south, and a room north of the narthex.

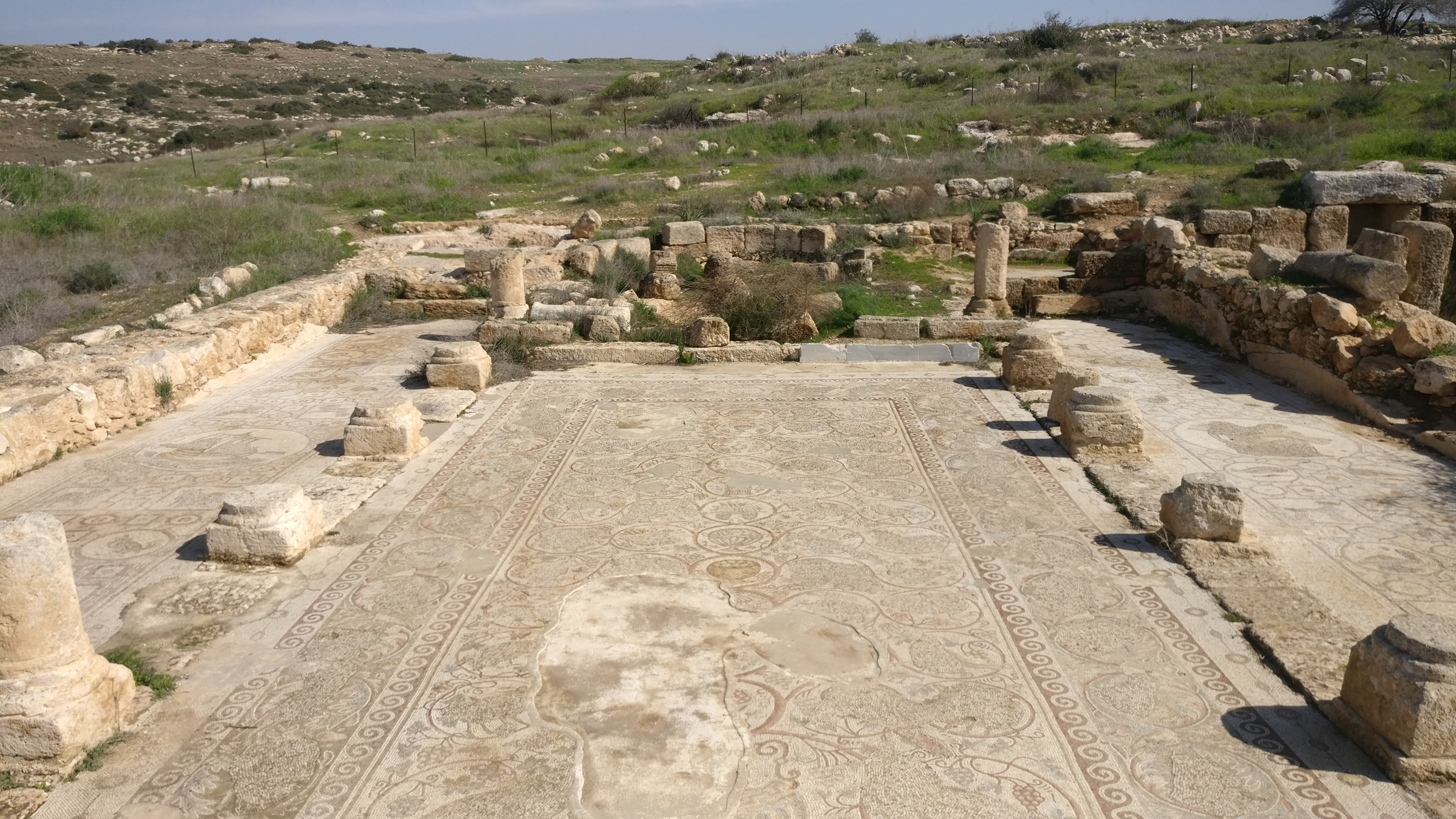
Mosaic floor at the church of Beth Loya

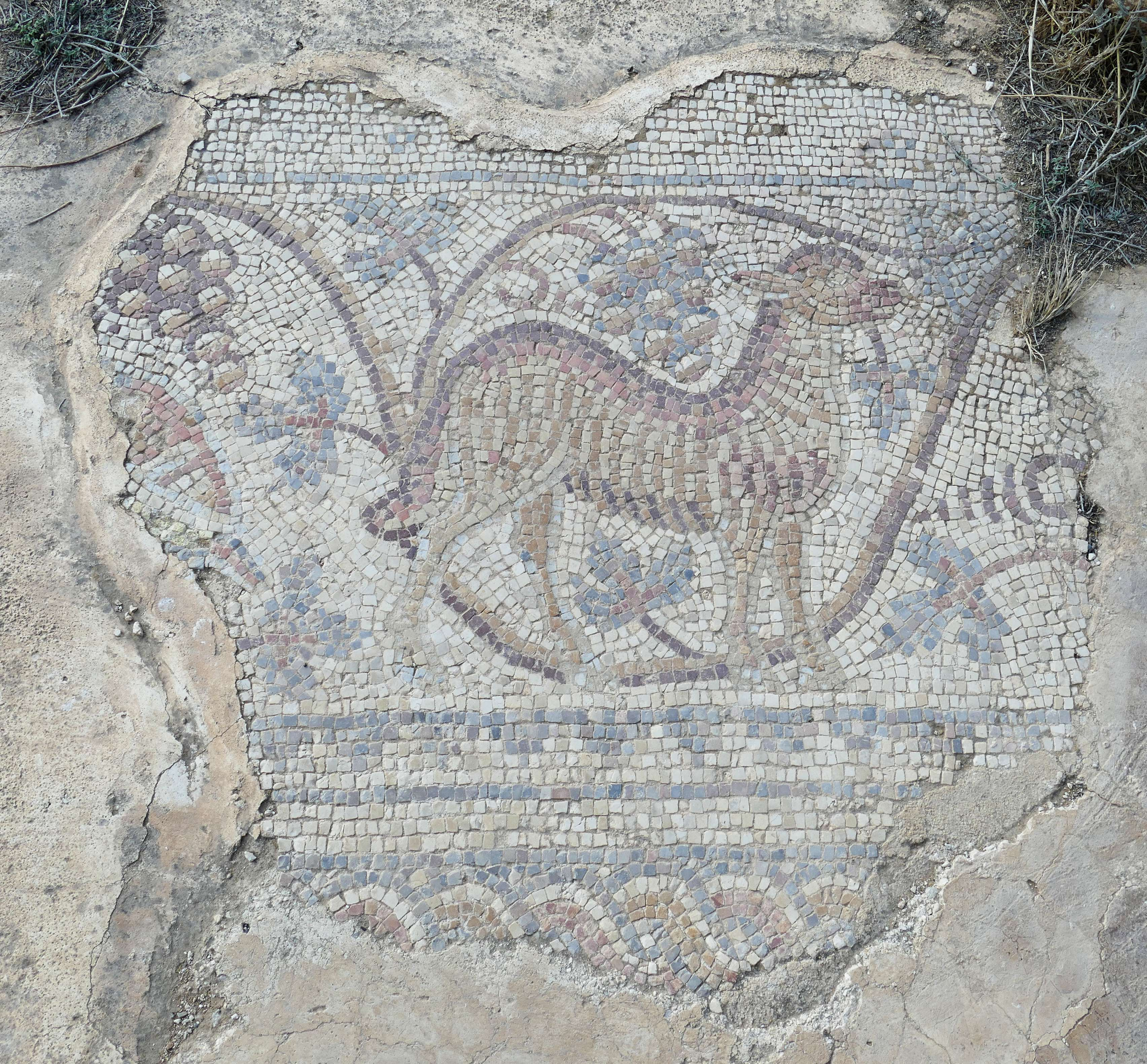
Detail of the mosaic

The church complex was paved with extensive mosaic floors covering an area of approximately 220 square meters. The mosaics display high tessera density and fine workmanship in figural areas. The mosaics of the nave, aisles, and narthex included vegetal scrolls, animals, birds, objects, and human figures. Following iconoclastic damage, the mosaics were repaired by resetting the original stones, often obscuring outlines but preserving the overall compositions. The mosaics in the chapel and baptistery were primarily geometric and survived intact. Several Greek inscriptions were incorporated into the mosaic pavements. These include dedicatory inscriptions naming donors (Azizos, Kyrikos, Epanagia), inscriptions commemorating individuals, and quotations from the Psalms and Proverbs. Inscriptions appear in the nave, chapel, baptistery, and bell-tower room.

In the 8th century CE, following the Muslim conquest, the mosaics depicting human and animal figures were defaced, possibly in response to an edict of the Umayyad caliph Yazid II (721 CE). The damaged areas were later partially repaired using the original tesserae. Later in the 8th century, the church was abandoned, its walls dismantled for building stone, and a smaller structure erected to the east incorporating reused masonry. The site was subsequently vandalized and reused as a Muslim cemetery, where burials were placed above and into the mosaic floors, accompanied by grave goods including jewelry, metal objects, and glass vessels.

Excavations also revealed agricultural installations associated with the church complex. An olive press was uncovered adjoining the south side of the church, east of the baptistery, and was integrated into the complex. A well-preserved Byzantine winepress was discovered just east of the church. Additionally, a rock-cut burial cave dating to the Byzantine period was found north of the chapel, outside the enclosure wall. It contained burial niches marked with carved crosses, along with oil lamps, glass vessels, and a bottle. Evidence indicates that the cave was later disturbed during the Mamluk period. Two small quarries located south of the atrium likely supplied building stone for the church.

=== Hermit Cell ===
Another remain from the Byzantine period is a large Greek inscription carved into the wall of a rock-cut cistern on the hill's eastern slope. The cistern was originally hewn in the Hellenistic period but was reused during the Byzantine era; by that time, tool marks, traces of plaster, lamp niches, and soot-stained recesses indicate that it was no longer used primarily for water storage but had been adapted for human occupation, likely for religious seclusion. Opposite the entrance is a single-line inscription over two meters long reading, "Jesus (is) here" (†Ἰ<η>σοῦς <ὧ>δε). Above the inscription is a faint depiction of a man standing in a boat and raising his right hand, possibly representing Jesus in a Gospel scene. Beneath the text appears a cross rendered as a chi rho or iota-chi monogram, enclosed within a circular medallion. The form of the letter bases suggests a date in the 7th or 8th century CE, supporting the interpretation of the cistern as a hermit's cell and providing another example of ascetic practices of seclusion near villages or churches that were common in this period.

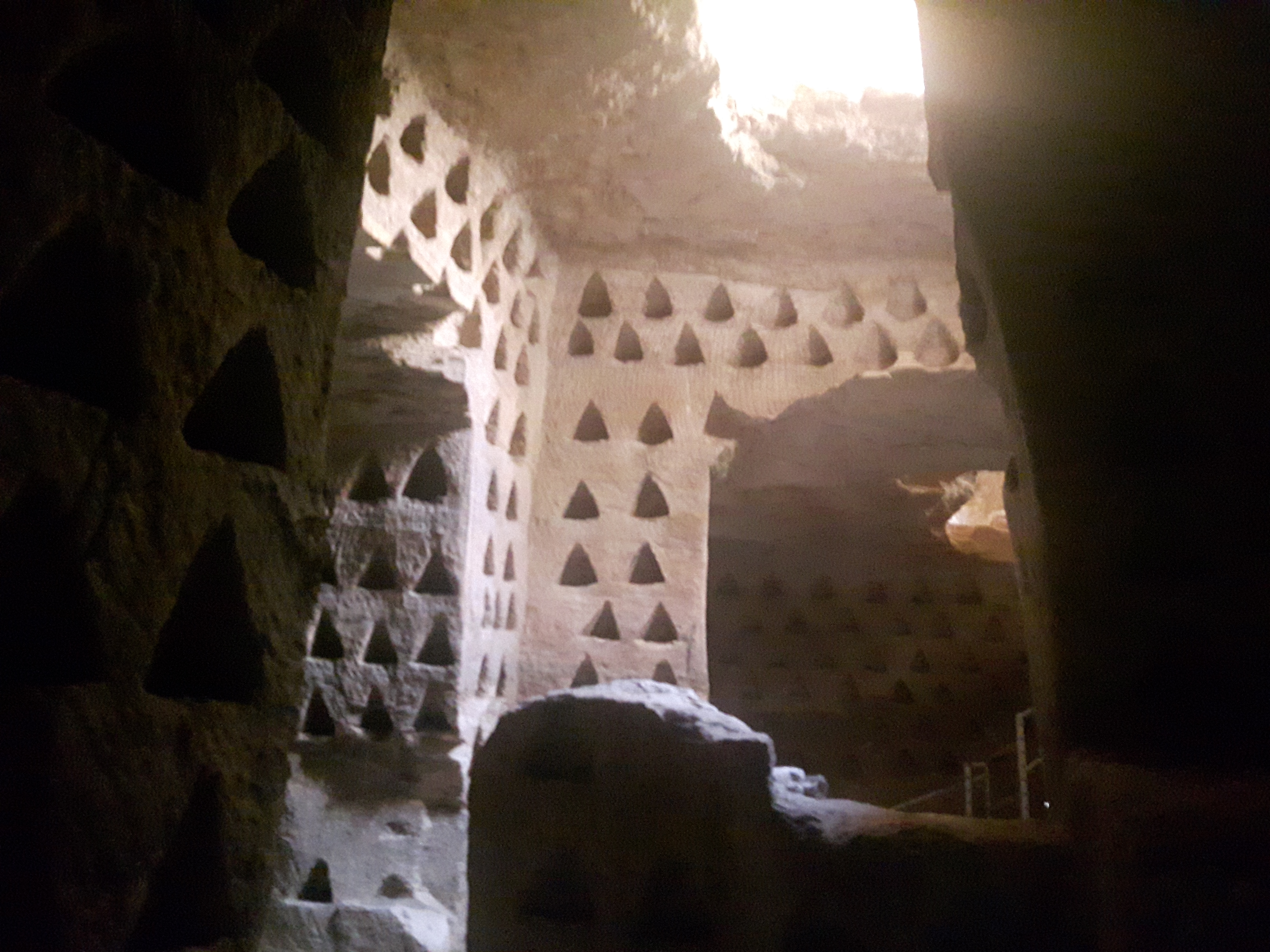
one of the largest columbarium in Israel

== Islamic and Mamluk periods ==
According to Marom, "Settlement at Beit Loya reached its zenith during the early Mamluk period. Archaeological excavations revealed a planned settlement with common hawsh-type dwellings around central courtyards and separated by narrow alleyways, indicating a segmentary social system".

Furthermore, according to Marom, the site's significance is due to its marginal status, namely

From its abandonment in the late fifteenth century CE, Beit Loya became a marginal site, the likes of which exist in the Southern Levant in their thousands. Like many of them, Beit Loya is absent from the written record and is difficult to contextualise historically from the scant material culture remains. However, Beit Loya offers a good case study for highlighting the value of oral sources and local knowledge for tracing the people and lifeways of the Ottoman countryside by incorporating living history and memory into a wider archaeological project.

In the 19th century, the site belonged to the villagers of Idhna. The rugged lands around the site provided pasture for livestock, and the underground caves on site served as winter shelters for the flocks. Marāh Bayt Lay, the vale south of the site, was cultivated with field crops like wheat and barley during winter, and sorghum, lentils and vetch during summer.

== Research history ==
Khirbet Beit Lei was surveyed by R.A.S. Macalister of the Palestine Exploration Fund, who found a rock-cut chapel and burial caves (published 1901).

Between 1972 and 1973, the site was surveyed by Yehuda Dagan. During this survey, no Iron Age remains were found. The survey further revealed that the site had been settled from the Hellenistic period until at least the Mamluk period. A number of hewn subterranean installations, including columbaria, olive presses, water cisterns, quarries, a stable and hideaways are attributed to the Hellenistic and Roman periods.

From 1979 to 1983, Yigal Tepper and Y. Shahar investigated the caves at the site.

In 1983 and 1986 Joseph Patrich and Yoram Tsafrir excavated a basilica church at the site, as well as an olive press, a wine press and a burial cave nearby, on behalf of the Institute of Archaeology of the Hebrew University in Jerusalem.

The Islamic period site has been excavated by Bethany J. Walker from Bonn University.

The excavations at the site were renewed in 2005 under the direction of the Oren Gutfeld, on behalf of the Institute of Archaeology of the Hebrew University in Jerusalem, with funding from a Mormon non-profit foundation.

== See also ==
- Horvat Midras
- Horvat 'Ethri
- Horvat Burgin
- Khirbet el-Ein
- Tel Goded
- Tel Lavnin

== Bibliography ==
- Cross, Frank Moore (2003) [1970]. "The Cave Inscriptions from Ḫirbat Bayt Layy [Khirbet Beit Lei]". Leaves from an Epigrapher's Notebook: Collected Papers in Hebrew and West Semitic Palaeography and Epigraphy. Leiden, The Netherlands: Brill. pp. 166–170. doi:10.1163/9789004369887.
- Gutfeld, Oren (2009). "H̱orbat Bet Loya: Preliminary Report". Hadashot Arkheologiyot: Excavations and Surveys in Israel / חדשות ארכיאולוגיות: חפירות וסקרים בישראל. 121. ISSN 1565-043X.
- Gutfeld, Oren; Ecker, Avner (2012). ""Jesus is here": an Ancient Greek inscription from Khirbet Beit Loya". In Churpadala, L. D.; Piccirillo, M. (eds.). Studies in Biblical and Christian Archaeology in Memory of Michele Piccirillo Ofm. Studium Biblicum Franciscanum. Collectio maior. Vol. 52. Edizioni Terra Santa. pp. 167–174.
- Patrich, Joseph; Tsafrir, Yoram (1993). "A Byzantine Church Complex at Horvat Beit Loya". In Tsafrir, Yoram (ed.). Ancient Churches Revealed. Jerusalem: Israel Exploration Society. pp. 265–272.
- Mandell, Alice; Smoak, Jeremy D. (2016). "Reconsidering the Function of Tomb Inscriptions in Iron Age Judah: Khirbet Beit Lei as a Test Case". Journal of Ancient Near Eastern Religions. 16 (2): 192–245. doi:10.1163/15692124-12341281. ISSN 1569-2116.
- Naveh, Joseph (1963). "Old Hebrew Inscriptions in a Burial Cave". Israel Exploration Journal. 13 (2): 74–92. ISSN 0021-2059.
