= Yavne-Yam =

Archaeological site in Israel

- יבנה־ים (Hebrew), Minet Rubin (Arabic)
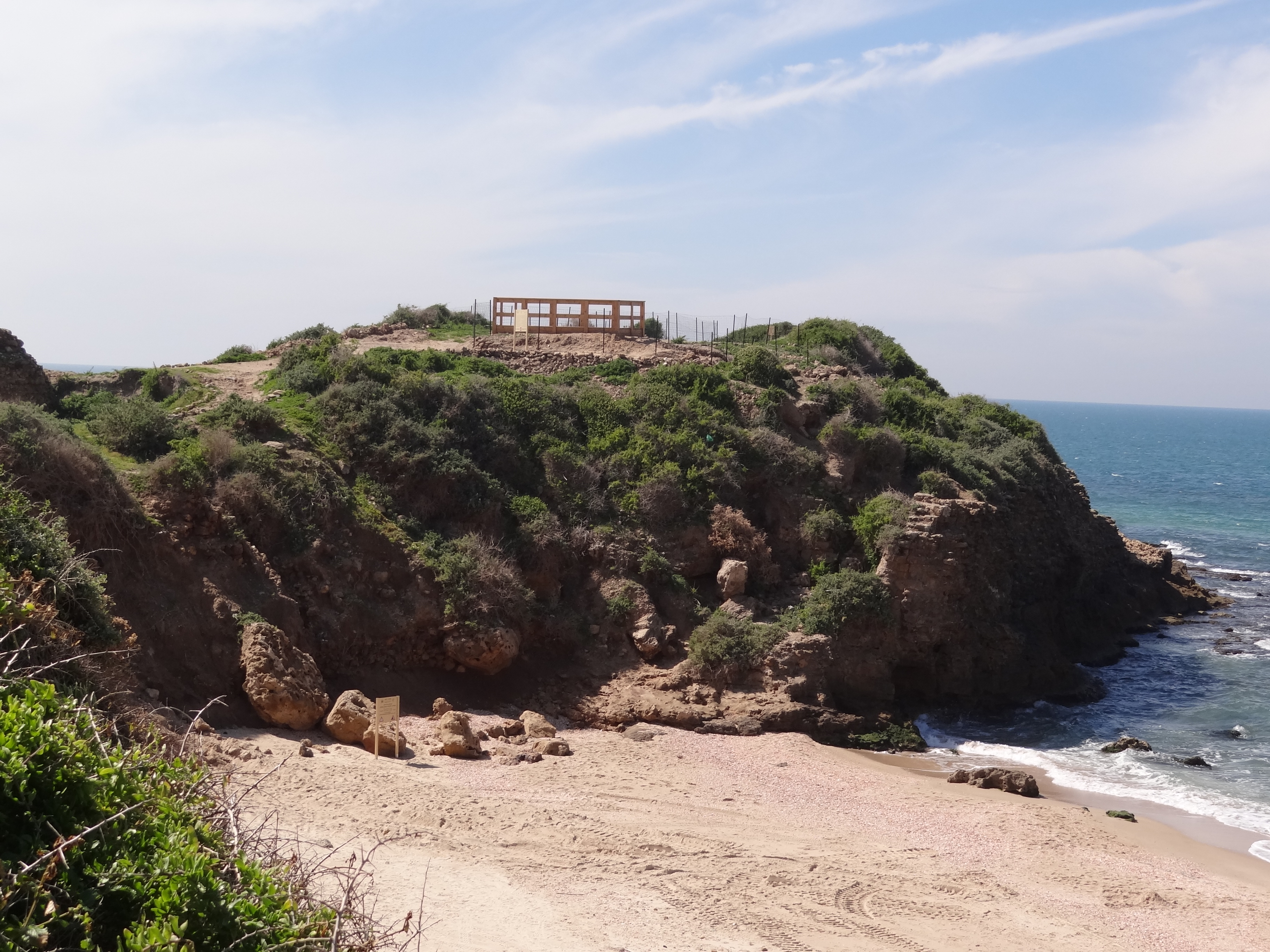

- Location within Israel
- 31°55′22″N 34°41′36″E
- Type: Tell
- Periods: Middle Bronze Age to Early Islamic Period
- Location: Mediterranean shore, near Palmachim
- Region: Gan Raveh Regional Council
- Part of: Settlement

History
- Abandoned: 12th century

Site notes
- Material: Stone
- Excavation dates: 1967-1969; 1992-present
- Archaeologists: Jacob Kaplan; Moshe Fischer
- Condition: ruins
- Public access: Yes

Yavne-Yam (Hebrew: יבנה ים, also spelled Yavneh-Yam, literally Yavne-Sea) or Minet Rubin (Arabic, literally Port of Rubin, referring to biblical Reuben; Greek: Ἰαμνιτῶν Λιμήν) is an archaeological site located on Israel's Southern Coastal Plain, about 15 km south of Tel Aviv. Built on eolianite hills next to a small promontory forming the sole anchorage able to provide shelter to seagoing vessels between Jaffa and the Sinai, Yavne-Yam is notable for its role as the port of ancient Yavne. Excavations carried out by Tel Aviv University since 1992 have revealed continuous habitation from the second millennium BCE up to the Middle Ages; the famous Yavne-Yam ostracon is named after the site.

== History ==
=== Bronze and Iron Ages ===
Surveys and excavations undertaken at Yavne-Yam during the 1950s and 1960s have revealed the existence of a large fortified site, consisting of a square enclosure with freestanding ramparts and marked by fortified gates, dating from the Middle and Late Bronze Age, during the second millennium BCE. This has also been confirmed by underwater surveys undertaken in the harbor, which have uncovered pottery characteristic of the period. Yavne-Yam may be the coastal city of Muḫḫazu (mHz) mentioned in the Amarna letters, a name reminiscent of the Aramaic word for port. It was inhabited during the late Iron Age, as testified by the Egyptian pottery and scarabs found at the site, as well as the discovery of Eastern Greek Pottery and several Hebrew-inscribed ostraca in nearby Mesad Hashavyahu. During the late 7th century BCE, the region apparently passed from Egyptian to Judean control, and was populated by Israelites, Canaanites, Phoenicians and perhaps even Greeks.

=== Hellenistic Port ===
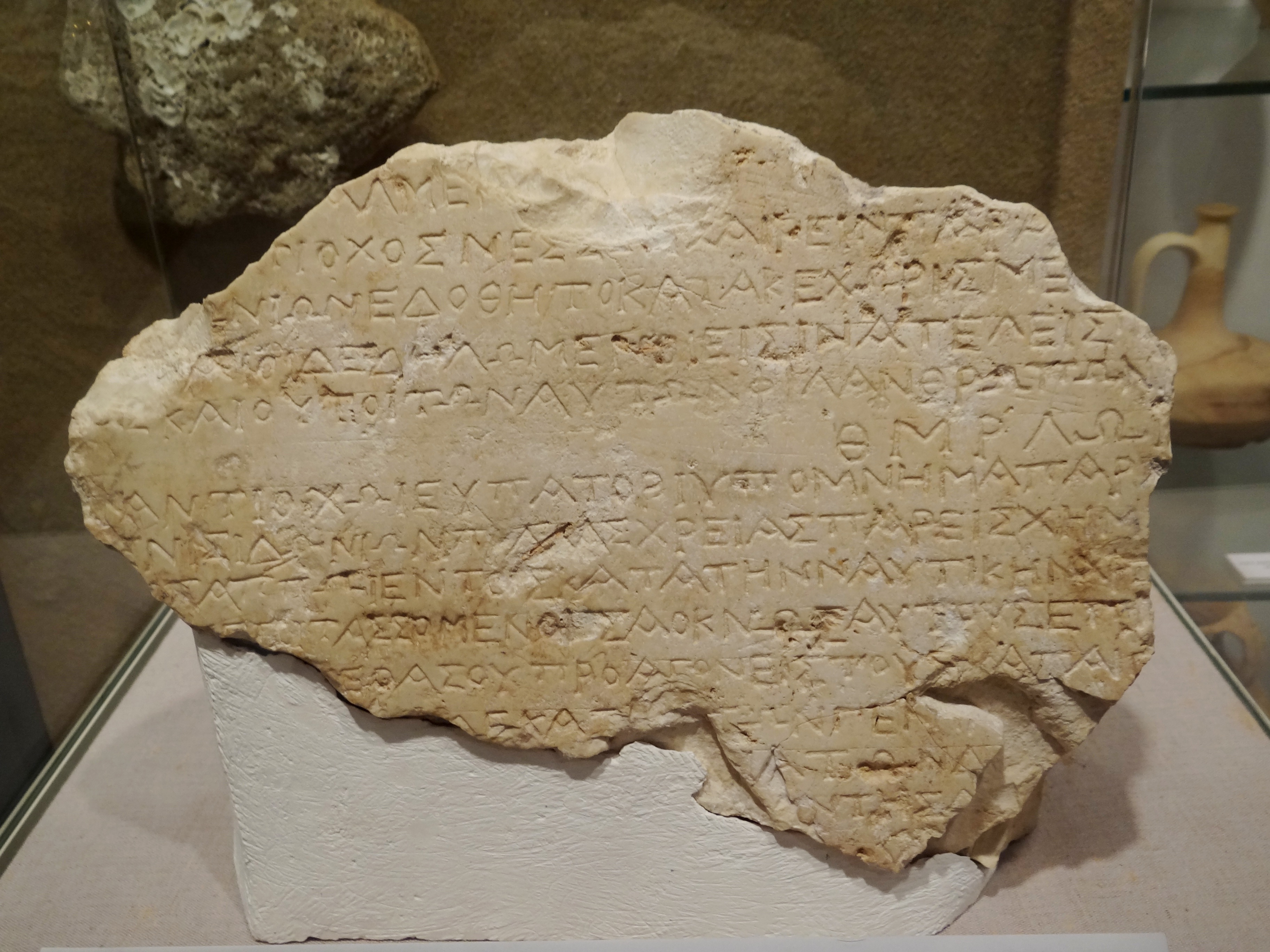
Inscription documenting correspondence between Antiochus V and Yavne-Yam's Sidonian community

The material culture uncovered at the site suggests that under Persian rule, Yavne-Yam was inhabited by Phoenicians from Sidon, also revealing a strong Hellenic influence. Alexander the Great's conquest of the Levant magnified such effects, and Yavne-Yam displays the prosperity and increased Hellenization of the population resulting from the political changes brought about by the Macedonian conquest and subsequent Ptolemaic and Seleucid control.

It was this Hellenization which eventually led to the Seleucid-Jewish conflict of the 2nd century BCE. What begun as tensions between hellenized and observant Jews, in 166 BCE erupted into an open revolt against the Seleucid Empire. Cities that had been thoroughly hellenized, such as Yavne (Iamnia) and Yavne-Yam, suffered the brunt of the Maccabean Revolt. According to 2 Maccabees, Judas Maccabeus, first leader of the revolt, "attacked the people of Jamnia by night and set fire to the harbor and the fleet, so that the glow of the light was seen in Jerusalem, thirty miles distant." Discoveries at the site and elsewhere, however, cast doubt on this account. During a preliminary survey conducted in December 1986, a fragmentary Greek inscription was found in Yavne-Yam, documenting correspondence between Seleucid king Antiochus V Eupator and the local Sidonian community. Dated to the summer of 163 BCE, it reveals the longstanding cooperation of the town with Seleucid authorities, at a time when inland Yavne was known as a base for operations against the rebels. Furthermore, the discovery on Delos of altars erected by the citizens of Iamnia and the persistence of Greek ware in the archaeological record have led archaeologists to believe Yavne-Yam had in fact resisted Maccabean attacks and remained a free Greek city for decades after the rebellion. It was eventually sacked and incorporated into the Hasmonean state in the late 2nd century BCE, during the rule of John Hyrcanus or Alexander Jannaeus.

=== Roman, Byzantine and Islamic ===
Jewish independence in Judea came to an end in the 1st century CE and the region gradually came under Roman control. Although archaeological remains from the Roman period are scant, Yavne-Yam is nevertheless mentioned in contemporary literature, including the works of Josephus, Pliny the Elder and Claudius Ptolemaeus. It re-emerged as a prosperous center of commerce during the Byzantine period, when it was populated by Christians, Jews and Samaritans. In the 5th century, Empress Aelia Eudocia sponsored the construction of a church and a hostel in the town, which was also the residence of Peter the Iberian, a Georgian Orthodox saint.

Following the Islamic conquest of the 7th century, the port became known by various names such as mahuz Yibna (harbor of Yavne), mahuz a-tani (second harbor, the first being Ashdod-Yam), or Minet Rubin (harbor of Rubin), after the nearby traditional burial place of biblical Reuben. These appear in works of prominent Arab geographers Al-Muqaddasi and Muhammad al-Idrisi. It became a Ribat, a fortified coastal lookout point where prisoner exchanges with the Byzantines were carried out, and a citadel, still partially visible today, was built on its southern promontory. The transformation of the town into a military outpost led to the departure of the non-Muslim population.

For reasons unknown, the site was abandoned in the 12th century. It is nevertheless depicted in several medieval maps such as Abraham Ortelius' 1584 map, where it appears as Jamnia Iudeorum Portus (Jamnia, the Jewish harbor).

== Excavations ==
Surveyed and explored during the 1950s and 1960s, Yavne-Yam was first excavated between 1967 and 1969 by Tel Aviv district archaeologist Jacob Kaplan. Concentrating on the perimeter fortifications, Kaplan unearthed a number of superimposed gates dating from the Middle and Late Bronze Ages. Excavations by Tel Aviv University resumed in 1992, under the direction of Prof. Moshe Fischer. These are still ongoing and are centered on the coast, bay and promontory. In 2007, a 6th-century Byzantine villa featuring a mosaic floor depicting trees and fruit baskets was uncovered at the site. Excavations on the promontory in 2011 revealed a Roman-style bathhouse within the 9th century Early Islamic period fortifications. The use of Roman technology at such a late date was previously unknown. The bathhouse is also the only known example of a bathhouse in an Islamic fortress.

Since 1980 underwater surveys have also been taking place in the harbor. These have revealed shipwrecks, anchors and fishing devices, all suggestive of intense maritime activity from the Bronze Age to modern times. In 2008, a lifeguard diving at the site found an Ophthalmos, a 4th or 5th century BCE marble discus measuring 20 cm in diameter. Resembling an eye, these adorned the bow of ancient ships and were supposed to protect the ships from the evil eye, envy and danger, while also assisting navigation. That same year, Moshe Fisher and Itamar Taxal on behalf of Tel-Aviv University's Institute of Archaeology conducted archaeological research at the site.

Prominent finds from Yavne-Yam and its vicinity are on display at Beit-Miriam, the museum of nearby Kibbutz Palmachim.

== See also ==
- Mesad Hashavyahu
