= Aramaic Uruk incantation =

The Aramaic Uruk incantation acquired 1913 by the Louvre, Paris and stored there under AO 6489 is a linguistically unique Aramaic text written in Late Babylonian cuneiform syllable signs and dates to the Seleucid Empire ca. 150 BCE. It was discovered in the reš-sanctuary in the ancient city of Uruk (Warka). The text contains a magical historiola, a short mythic story providing a paradigm for the magical action, divided into two nearly repetitive successive parts. This genre was continued in the Aramaic magical text corpus of late antiquity from Iraq and Iran, most prominently in incantation bowls and Mandaic lead rolls. Many scholars have analyzed the text since the publication of the master handcopy by François Thureau-Dangin in 1922.

The text follows a strict literary style similar to earlier Babylonian incantations, with typical elements like parallelism and chiasmus, for example in the incantation series Maqlû and Šurpu. It is composed in standard literary Aramaic and follows a transliteration system of Aramaic phonemes in cuneiform syllable signs (e.g. <*ḍ> > <q> > Late Aramaic <’>). The text is the only known Aramaic text of this period from Mesopotamia, and establishes the early presence of the masculine plural ending of the determinative -ē on nouns as in Eastern Aramaic, but lacks certain morphemes as demonstrative pronouns, and the imperfect. It is noteworthy that it contains an idiomatic expression in line 2, which already occurs in the Aramaic part of the Book of Ezra, "a wood shall be pulled out from his house" (יִתְנְסַ֥ח אָע֙ מִן־בַּיְתֵ֔הּ, Ezra 6:11).

== Literature ==
- Peter C. Jensen, Der Babylonische Beschwörungstext in spätbabylonischer Schrift (Marburg, 1926).
- Godfrey R. Driver, "An Aramaic Inscription in the Cuneiform Script," Archiv für Orientforschung 3, 1926, pp. 47–53.
- P. O. Bostrup, "Aramäische Ritualtexte in Keilschrift," Acta Orientalia V, 1927, pp. 257–305.
- Erich Ebeling, Ein Beschwörungstext in aramäischer-akkadischer Mischsprache (Berliner Beiträge zur Keilschriftforschung II,2; Berlin, 1935).
- Cyrus H. Gordon, "The Aramaic Incantation in Cuneiform," Archiv für Orientforschung 12, 1938, pp. 105–117.
- Benno Landsberger, "Zu den aramäischen Beschwörungen in Keilschrift," Archiv für Orientforschung 12, 1938, pp. 247–257.
- Franz Rosenthal, "Das Reichsaramäische," in Die aramaistische Forschung seit Theodor Nöldeke’s Veröffentlichungen (Leiden 1939; reprint 1964), pp. 34–35.
- Cyrus H. Gordon, "The Cuneiform Aramaic Incantation," Orientalia NS 9, 1940, pp. 29–38.
- André Dupont-Sommer, "La tablette cunéiforme araméenne de Warka," Revue d’Assyriologie 39, 1942–1944, pp. 35–62.
- Markham J. Geller, "The Aramaic Incantation in Cuneiform Script (AO 6489 = TCL 6,58)," Jaarbericht. Ex Oriente Lux 35-36, 1997–2000, pp. 127–146.
- Christa Müller-Kessler, "Die aramäische Beschwörung und ihre Rezeption in den mandäisch magischen Texten am Beispiel ausgewählter aramäischer Beschwörungsformulare," in Rika Gyselen (ed.), Magie et magiciens, charmes et sortilèges (Res Orientales XIV; Louvain: Peeters, 2002), pp. 195–201 [excellent photography]. ISBN 9782950826688
