= Historiola =

Incantation incorporating a short mythic story

The historiola is a modern term for a kind of incantation incorporating a short mythic story that provides the paradigm for the desired magical action. It can be found in ancient Mesopotamian, Egyptian and Greek mythology, in the Aramaic Uruk incantation, incorporated in Mandaean incantations, as well as in Jewish kabbalah. There are also Christian examples evoking Christian legends.
