= Mesad Hashavyahu =

Iron Age Levantine fortress

- מצד חשביהו (Hebrew)
- Location within Israel
- 31°54′27″N 34°41′20″E
- Type: Fortress
- Periods: Iron Age
- Associated with: Judahites
- Location: Palmachim, Israel
- Region: Coastal Plain

Site notes
- Condition: Destroyed

Meṣad Hashavyahu is an ancient fortress on the border of the Iron Age Kingdom of Judah facing the Philistine city of Ashdod near the Mediterranean Sea. An artifact dubbed the Yavne-Yam ostracon was discovered in the Meṣad Hashavyahu excavations in 1960.

The site covers an area of approximately 1.5 acres (6,100 m^{2}). It lies 1.7 kilometres (1.1 mi) south of the seaport Yavne-Yam and 7 kilometres (4.3 mi) northwest of the main city of Yavne. The original name of the fort is unknown; it was given a name found on several inscribed ostraca recovered at the site.

== History ==
The fortress dates from approximately 630 BCE to 609 BCE, within the reigning years of Josiah, king of Judah. William F. Albright wrote, "The life of the fortress could be dated within narrow limits by the typical late pre-exilic and early Ionian pottery found on the site, as well as by historical considerations, which suggest a date about 630 BCE. This would be just after the death of the Assyrian king Ashurbanipal and before the occupation of the Philistine Plain by Psammetichus of Egypt."

Both Greek pottery and Judahite ostraca were found (see below). Some scholars believe the site had been used by Greek mercenaries. They might have been serving under Judean command in Josiah's battles against the military of the Twenty-sixth Dynasty of Egypt, as Yohanan Aharoni supposed. However, both Greek and Judahite mercenaries served in the Egyptian army at the time of the late monarchic period. According to Israel Finkelstein, "it is therefore quite reasonable that the unit stationed in the Egyptian fort of Messad Hashavyahu included Judahite mercenaries", and Egyptian control was more likely than Judean: "there can be little doubt that Egypt, which expanded in the late 7th century [BCE] along the coast of the Levant, was strong enough to prevent Josiah from building an isolated fort in the middle of an area in which Egypt had strong strategic interests".

One of the significant issues dependent on this debate is whether or not the Kingdom of Judah under King Josiah had access to a seaport. The fact that the fort was south-facing may imply that it was built for the protection of Yavne and the surrounding agricultural lands, including the seaport of Yavne-Yam, against aggressors from the south, either Philistine or Egyptian.

The fortress was abandoned in 609 BCE or shortly thereafter, likely associated with the loss of territory due to occupation by the Egyptian army following Josiah's death.

It was excavated by Joseph Naveh in 1960.
