= Joseph Naveh =

Israeli linguist and archaeologist

- Born: January 21, 1928; Mukachevo, Czechoslovakia (now Ukraine)
- Died: November 21, 2011 (aged 83); Jerusalem
- Occupations: Archaeologist, epigrapher, palaeographer
- Known for: West Semitic epigraphy, Aramaic and Hebrew scripts

Academic background
- Thesis: The Development of the Aramaic Script (1970)

Joseph Naveh (Hebrew: יוסף נוה; January 21, 1928 – November 21, 2011) was an Israeli linguist, paleographer, epigraphist, and archaeologist. He was a professor at the Hebrew University of Jerusalem and a prominent scholar in the field of West Semitic scripts and ancient inscriptions.

== Early life and education ==
Naveh was born into a Jewish family in Mukachevo, Czechoslovakia, a city with a complex history of changing sovereignties. At the time of his birth, the city was under Czechoslovak administration, but reverted to Hungarian control in 1938.

He attended a Hebrew school in Mukachevo and later immigrated to Mandatory Palestine after World War II. In 1948, he joined the Israel Defense Forces.

He studied Bible, Jewish history, and archaeology at the Hebrew University of Jerusalem.

== Career ==
From 1955 to 1971, Naveh worked at the Israel Department of Antiquities, serving as district archaeologist from 1958. He participated in excavations at sites such as En Gedi and Tel Miqne, which he identified with biblical Ekron. In 1960, he led excavations at Mesad Hashavyahu, where he discovered Hebrew ostraca from the reign of King Josiah.

In the 1960s, he focused increasingly on West Semitic epigraphy and palaeography. He earned his doctorate with a dissertation titled The Development of the Aramaic Script (published 1970). From 1971 to 1991, he taught in the Department of Ancient Semitic Languages at the Hebrew University. He continued publishing after retirement.

== Research ==
Naveh specialized in deciphering and interpreting inscriptions in Aramaic, Phoenician, and Paleo-Hebrew. His comparative studies linked scripts to broader historical and cultural developments. He also contributed to the understanding of the evolution of the Greek alphabet and exposed several modern forgeries of ancient inscriptions.

== Memberships and Honors ==
He was an active member of the Israel Exploration Society, serving on its council and as honorary member. Since 1969, he was on the editorial board of the Israel Exploration Journal. In 1994, he was elected to the Israel Academy of Sciences and Humanities.

== Legacy ==
Naveh's contributions to Semitic palaeography remain foundational. His works are widely cited in studies of Semitic linguistics, epigraphy, and the archaeology of the ancient Near East.

== Selected publications ==
- Joseph Naveh: Studies in West-Semitic Epigraphy, 2010, Magnes Press, Israel, ISBN 978-9654933872
- Joseph Naveh, Shaul Shaked: Aramaic Documents from Ancient Bactria, 2006, Khalili Collections, ISBN 978-1874780748
- Joseph Naveh: Aramaic Ostraca of the Fourth Century BC from Idumaea, 1998, Magnes Press, Israel, ISBN 978-9652239587
- Joseph Naveh: Early History of the Alphabet: An Introduction to West Semitic Epigraphy and Paleography, 1997, Magnes Press, Israel, ISBN 978-9652234360 Inhaltsverzeichnis online als pdf
- Jigael Jadin, Joseph Naveh, Yaʿaḳov Meshorer: Masada I: The Yigael Yadin Excavations 1963–1965 Final Reports, 1989, Israel Exploration Society, ISBN 978-9652210104
- Joseph Naveh, Shaul Shaked: Amulets and Magic Bowls: Aramaic Incantations of Late Antiquity, 1987, Magnes Press, Israel, ISBN 978-9652235312 at Google Books
- Joseph Naveh: Die Entstehung des Alphabets: Einführung in die Archäologie der Schrift, 1975, Palphot, ISBN 978-0304293360 at Google Books
- Joseph Naveh: The Origin of the Mandaic Script, 1970
- Joseph Naveh: The scripts of two ostraca from Elath, 1966, Middle East Research Journals, Band 30 online als pdf, hebräisch
- Joseph Naveh: Hebrew inscriptions in a tomb cave from the period of the first temple, 1963, Middle East Research Journals, Band 27 online als pdf, hebräisch
- Joseph Naveh: More Hebrew inscriptions from Mesad Hashavyahu, 1963, Middle East Research Journals, Band 27 online als pdf, hebräisch
- Joseph Naveh: A Hebrew letter from Mezad Hashavyahu, 1961, Middle East Research Journals, Band 25 online als pdf, hebräisch
- Joseph Naveh: Chalcolithic remains at 'Ein Gedi, 1958, Middle East Research Journals, Band 22 online als pdf, hebräisch

== See also ==
- Palaeography
- Aramaic language
- Hebrew language
- History of the alphabet
