= Khirbet Jib'it =

Archaeological site in the northern West Bank

Khirbet Jib'it (Khŭrbet Jibeit)
- Location within the West Bank
- 32°01′53.9″N 35°21′42.8″E
- Type: settlement, tell, hiding complexes
- Periods: Limited activity: Bronze Age; Main settlement: Iron Age to Ottoman period
- Location: Near Al-Mughayyir and Malachei HaShalom, West Bank
- Region: Samaria (historical); Mount Ephraim (historical)
- Palestine grid: 184/159

Site notes
- Height: 645 m (2,116 ft)
- Area: 10 hectares (25 acres)
- Condition: In ruins

Khirbet Jib'it is an archaeological site and a multi-period tell in the southwestern Samarian highlands, in the modern-day West Bank. It lies on the western edge of the hill country, bordering the Samarian desert, and overlooking the approaches to the Jordan Valley. The site occupies three connected hills, and its principal settlement concentrated on the middle hill.

The earliest remains date to the Bronze Age, but the site became a substantial settlement in the Iron Age, when it was among the larger settlements in the Mount Ephraim area, which was part of ancient Israel and Judah. Remains from later periods include a possibly Hasmonean ashlar fortification wall, an underground hiding complex containing two mikvehs (Jewish ritual baths), and a Byzantine church that was active from the 6th to the 8th centuries CE and was built over an earlier Hasmonean or Herodian structure. Other features include residential quarters, wine and olive presses, a large rock-cut cistern, and a complex of underground halls. The site continued to be inhabited into the medieval period, and in 1596 an Ottoman tax register recorded a village of 23 Muslim households. By the 19th century it had been deserted.

The site was first noted by European travelers in the 19th century and was later visited by the PEF Survey of Western Palestine. A salvage excavation by Zvi Ilan and Uri Dinur in 1982 was followed by more recent surveys. The name is thought to derive from the Hebrew root for "hill," and several scholars have connected the site with biblical locations mentioned in 2 Samuel 2:24. Its ancient name may have been Giv'it.

== Geography ==
Khirbet Jib'it is located in the southeast of the historical Samaria region, on the western edge of the hill country overlooking the approaches to the Jordan Valley. It lies at an elevation of about 645 metres (2,116 ft) above sea level, with the Allon Road to its east. Khirbet el-Marajim, an archaeological site consisting of the remains of a small rural settlement with two hiding complexes, is located 1.5 kilometres (0.93 mi) to the northwest.

The archaeological site occupies three hills connected to neighboring ridges by saddles and covers approximately 10 ha (100 dunams). The principal settlement was concentrated on the central hill. The eastern and western hills preserve multiple rock-cut installations. Its principal natural water source was the spring of Ein Rashash, about 1.2 kilometres (0.75 mi) away; about 50 cisterns were documented at the site.

== Research history ==
The first modern author known to have mentioned Jib'it was C. W. M. van de Velde, who traveled throughout the region in 1851–1852 and noted ruins called Jabaid. He did not provide a detailed description.

In 1870, Victor Guérin visited the area. He described Jib'it as a prominent hill containing ancient remains, including buried structures, cisterns, and what he regarded as public buildings. The Survey of Western Palestine, conducted by C. R. Conder and H. H. Kitchener of the Palestine Exploration Fund, documented the site as Khŭrbet Jibeit. It mentions "foundations, cisterns and rock-cut tombs, now blocked up; drafted stones, with the rustic boss. The masonry is of moderate size".

The Ephraim Survey, led by Israel Finkelstein, described Jib'it as "a very large ruin with the remains of many buildings", also mentioning a sheikh's tomb, cisterns, caves, rock cuttings and burial caves.

In 1982, Ilan and Dinur led a survey and a salvage excavation on behalf of the Archaeological Staff Officer of Judea and Samaria; the results were published in 1987.

The Manasseh Hill Country Survey visited the site in 2003. The site was surveyed again as part of the New Southern Samaria Survey (started 2014), led by Dvir Raviv of the Bar Ilan University. Raviv conducted another survey in the Wadi er-Rashash area in 2020.

== Name and identification ==
The name Jib'it appears in the Kitab al-Ta'rikh of Abu'l-Fath, a 14th-century Samaritan chronicle, which mentions it together with Zeita and Qaryot as one of the villages from which the Gibeonites came to Joshua. Multiple scholars have pointed to the Hebrew origin of the name, which, as with other sites in the region, seems to derive from the Hebrew root ג.ב.ע, g.v.’, 'hill'. The original name may have been the Hebrew Giv'it.

Ilan and Dinur proposed a connection between Jib'it and the "wilderness of Gibeon" (Hebrew: מִדְבַּר גִּבְעוֹן) mentioned in 2 Samuel 2:24 (distinct from the more famous Gibeon in the territory of Benjamin, which is generally identified with the modern Al Jib). Yoel Elizur suggested identifying the site with the Givat haAmmah (Hebrew: גִּבְעַת אֹמָה, lit. 'hill of Ammah') mentioned in the same passage.

== History and archaeology ==
Adam Zertal and Shay Bar of the Manasseh Hill Country Survey write that the site was occupied "from the Iron Age to the Ottoman period".

=== Bronze Age ===
Pottery remains indicate limited activity during the Bronze Age (II, Intermediate Bronze, and Middle Bronze II periods). Middle Bronze shaft graves were documented north of the settlement.

=== Iron Age ===
The settlement expanded during the Iron Age. During this period, the inhabited area covered around 5 ha (50 dunams), making it one of the larger settlements in the Ephraim hill country. The assemblage collected during the Manasseh Hill Country Survey included Iron Age I pottery and a considerably larger Iron II–III component.

During the Iron Age IIB, the surrounding area prospered as part of the Kingdom of Israel; whether the site was resettled or remained continuously occupied following the Assyrian conquest (c. 720 BCE) remains unclear. The surveyors also identified 7th-century BCE pottery as Judean, leading them to suggest that the settlement was part of the Kingdom of Judah, which expanded to this region under King Josiah.

=== Persian and Hellenistic periods ===
In the Persian period, the site "shrank drastically", but "possibly recovered its urban nature" in the Hellenistic period. Small amounts of Persian and Hellenistic pottery were collected at the site.

According to the Manasseh Hill surveyors, during the Hasmonean period the central hill was surrounded by an "ashlar wall with dominant towers". They attribute its construction to the Hasmonean annexation of the borderland of northern Judea and tentatively associate it with the nearby fortress of Alexandrium (also known as Sartaba), which is visible from Jib'it.

=== Roman period ===
An underground hiding complex containing two mikvehs (Jewish ritual baths), both dating from the early Roman period, was discovered at the site. Remains from this era found at the complex and on the surface include limestone vessels and potsherds dating from both the period between the First Jewish Revolt and the Bar Kokhba Revolt (70–132 CE), as well as from the Bar Kokhba Revolt (132–136 CE) itself. Coins found on the surface of the site include a First Jewish Revolt coin, a bronze prutah, dating from the revolt's second year, 67/68 CE. It is inscribed with "the freedom of Zion".

Dvir Raviv, Scott Stripling, and Yoav Farhi suggest that during the early Roman period, Khirbet Jib'it was part of the Jewish-inhabited toparchy of Acrabat and participated in the Bar Kokhba Revolt, when it was part of Bar Kokhba's administration. They suggest that during the revolt, some refugees may have escaped to the Wadi er-Rashash cave, which is located 1.5 kilometres (0.93 mi) away and has also yielded remains from this period, including a Bar Kokhba coin.

=== Byzantine period ===
A church was exposed on the western edge of the middle hill. It was active from the 6th to the 8th centuries CE, and again in the Mamluk period. It consisted of an east–west basilical nave measuring approximately 14.7 metres (48 ft) by 10.5 metres (34 ft), divided by two rows of pillars and terminating in an eastern apse. Fragments of the mosaic flooring remain intact in the southern aisle and a northern chamber off the nave. A stone-paved courtyard extended west and south of the church. Finds include "a stone with an incised cross, a column capital, and a gable-shaped ashlar".

The northern wall of the church was constructed over an earlier wall of drafted ashlar masonry, which the excavators interpreted as belonging to a Hasmonean or Herodian public building. Stones from this structure were reused in the church.

=== Medieval period ===
As part of a broader occupational decline in the vicinity during the early Islamic period, the site once again ceased to be an urban settlement. However, this decline overturned in later medieval periods. A large part of the ceramic assemblage gathered during the Manasseh Hill Country Survey dates to the medieval period.

=== Ottoman period ===
In 1596, the site appeared in Ottoman tax registers as a village in the nahiyah of Jabal Qubal in the sanjak of Nablus. It had a population of 23 households, all Muslim. By the 19th century, the site was deserted.

Two sheikhs' tombs, those of Sheikh Muhammad and Sheikh Badir, also stand on the site.

=== Other remains ===
Other remains at the site include domestic quarters, where houses were built according to a relatively regular plan, generally consisting of a superstructure with a courtyard, an internal cistern, and a cellar. Agricultural installations include an olive press and two winepresses. A large vaulted structure, possibly a roadside inn (Arabic: khan), was discovered on the eastern slope.

A large rock-cut cistern, about 29 metres (95 ft) by 26 metres (85 ft), was discovered north of the eastern hill. Niches interpreted as lamp recesses were cut into its walls and pillars.

A complex of underground halls interconnected by rock-cut passages was found north of the central hill. The largest hall measures approximately 22 metres (72 ft) by 17 metres (56 ft).

== See also ==
- Archaeology of the Bar Kokhba Revolt
- Khirbet el-Qutt
- Khirbet Kulasun
- Shiloh (biblical city)

== Bibliography ==
=== Sources ===
- Bar-Ilan University (2022). "A Coin, a Cave and a Rebellion | Bar Ilan University". www.biu.ac.il.
- Conder, Claude Reignier; Kitchener, Horatio Herbert (1882). Palmer, Edward Henry; Besant, Walter (eds.). The Survey of Western Palestine: Memoirs of the Topography, Orography, Hydrography, and Archæology. Vol. II. London: Committee of the Palestine Exploration Fund. p. 393.
- Elizur, Yoel (1993). "הצעת זיהוי חדשה לעיר הישראלית בעין סמיה" [A New Proposal for the Identification of An Israelite City at Ein Samia]. Judea and Samaria Research Studies (in Hebrew). 3: 17–28.
- Finkelstein, Israel; Lederman, Zvi; Bunimovitz (1997). Highlands of Many Cultures: The Southern Samaria Survey (The Sites). Ramat Aviv: Institute of Archaeology, Tel Aviv University. pp. 751–753.
- Hütteroth, Wolf-Dieter; Abdulfattah, Kamal (1977). Historical Geography of Palestine, Transjordan and Southern Syria in the Late 16th Century. Erlanger Geographische Arbeiten, Sonderband 5. Erlangen, Germany: Vorstand der Fränkischen Geographischen Gesellschaft. p. 133. ISBN 3-920405-41-2.
- Ilan, Zvi; Dinur, Uri (1987). "גבעית – ישוב קדום בספר מדבר שומרון" [Giv'it, an Ancient Settlement in the Samarian Desert Fringe]. Samaria and Benjamin (in Hebrew). 1: 114–130.
- Raviv, Dvir; Har-Even, Benjamin; Aharonovitz, Efraim; Tavger, Aharon (2015). "מסתורים במדבר: מערכות מסתור מימי מרידות היהודים ברומאים בספר המדבר של ארץ בנימין ודרום השומרון" [Hidings in the Desert - Hiding Complexes from the Time of Jewish Revolts Against the Romans in South Samaria and the Benjamin Desert]. In The Highland's Depth (in Hebrew). 5: 123–150.
- Raviv, Dvir; Stripling, Scott; Farhi, Yoav (2023). "New Findings from the Acrabat Toparchy and the Northern Border of Judea before and after the Great Revolt" (PDF). Jerusalem Journal of Archaeology. 4: 108–136. doi:10.52486/01.00004.5. ISSN 2788-8819.
- Van de Velde, C. W. M. (1854). Narrative of a Journey through Syria and Palestina in 1851 and 1852. Edinburgh and London.
- Zertal, Adam; Bar, Shay (2022). The Manasseh Hill Country Survey: The South-Eastern Samaria Shoulder, from Wadi Rashash to Wadi 'Aujah. Culture and History of the Ancient Near East, 21.7. Vol. VII. Brill. ISBN 978-90-04-51304-4.
