= Khirbet Kulasun =

Archaeological site in the northern West Bank

- Khirbet Kulāsūn (Arabic)
- Pine trees on the spur of Kulason

- Location within the West Bank
- 32°01′32″N 35°19′56″E
- Type: settlement (farmstead), hiding complexes
- Periods: Earliest remains: Iron Age; Main phase of activity: Hellenistic (Hasmonean) and Early Roman periods; Later activity: Byzantine period
- Cultures: Second Temple Judaism
- Location: West Bank
- Region: Samaria (southeastern fringe; historical)

Site notes
- Height: 790 m (2,590 ft)
- Condition: In ruins

Khirbet Kulasun or Khirbet Kulason is an archaeological site on the southeastern fringe of the historical region of Samaria, in the modern-day West Bank. It occupies a spur about 790 metres (2,590 ft) above sea level, close to the larger archaeological site of Khirbet Jib'it. Pottery dating to the Iron Age, Hellenistic, early Roman and Byzantine periods has been found, but the site's main phase of activity dates from Hasmonean and early Roman periods, when it belonged to the Jewish settlement network of the toparchy of Acrabat.

Its remains include two hiding systems linked to the Bar Kokhba Revolt, one of which appears to have originated as an Iron Age cellar winery. Other rock-cut remains include a mikveh (Jewish ritual bath), a single burial cave, and cisterns. Archaeologists Eitan Klein and Boaz Zissu proposed that the settlement was a small Jewish agricultural farmstead.

== Geography ==
Khirbet Kulasun occupies a relatively flat, narrow spur about 790 metres (2,590 ft) above sea level, situated in the transitional zone between the Samarian highlands and the Samarian desert. The archaeological site of Khirbet Jib'it is located about 2.5 kilometres (1.6 mi) to the east. During the late Second Temple period, this site and other locations in the surrounding area belonged to the Jewish settlement network within the toparchy of Acrabat, which had been annexed to Judea under the Hasmoneans and persisted into the Bar Kokhba Revolt.

== Research history ==
The ruin was first described by Victor Guérin, who noted ruined buildings and several rock-cut cisterns. The PEF Survey of Western Palestine later visited the site, recorded its name as Kulâsôn, and noted "Heaps of stones on a hill-top." In a 1941 British map, the site appeared as Kulâsûn.

Dimitri Baramki of the Department of Antiquities of Mandatory Palestine visited the site in 1934, but did not report any significant finds. In 1986, Israel Finkelstein of the Tel Aviv University surveyed it as part of the Ephraim Survey. In 1999, an underground installation containing an olive press was located after looting had exposed parts of the subterranean remains. In 2009, following damage caused by agricultural works, modern construction and archaeological looting, another survey was conducted by Eitan Klein and Boaz Zissu on behalf of the Department of Land of Israel Studies and Archaeology at Bar-Ilan University.

Relevant archeological periods
Ancient Near East
- Iron Age: 1200–587 BCE

Classical antiquity
- Hellenistic (including Hasmonean): 332–63 BCE
- Early and Middle Roman: 63 BCE–136 CE

Late Antiquity
- Late Roman: 136–324
- Byzantine: 324–636

Among the pottery from the 1986 survey, about 20% was assigned to the Iron Age, 50% to the Hellenistic and Roman periods, and 30% to the Byzantine period. In the 2009 survey, by contrast, more than 90% of the pottery dated from approximately the early 1st century BCE to the first third of the 2nd century CE. According to Klein and Zissu, this finding indicates that the era was the site's main phase of activity.

== Archaeology ==
One underground hiding complex, known as System #12, consists of a large central hall and three inner chambers. The complex had previously been reported as containing an olive press, although Klein and Zissu did not find its components during their survey and suggested that they may have been removed by looters. The complex was later adapted as a hiding system. Its rooms are connected by low, narrow, rock-cut passages that display features typical of hiding complexes known elsewhere in Roman Judaea. The pottery recovered from the site is characteristic of Bar Kokhba-era assemblages.

Another underground complex, known as System #14, features seven interconnected bell-shaped chambers, with an eighth located near the main entrance. They are closely grouped and generally measure about 2 metres (6.6 ft) to 2.5 metres (8.2 ft) in diameter and 2 metres (6.6 ft) in height. Many potsherds found across the hiding system date from the first century CE to the first third of the second century CE. A fragment of a chalkstone vessel supports the Jewish identity of the inhabitants. Iron Age pottery, including fragments of collared-rim storage vessels, was recovered in association with the chambers. Klein and Zissu proposed that the complex originally functioned as an Iron Age subterranean winery (comparable to a wine cellar complex found at Gibeon), before being adapted for use during preparations for the Bar Kokhba Revolt.

A third complex, System #9, is a roughly rectangular rock-cut chamber identified as a mikveh (a Jewish ritual bath). It is separated from a large cistern by a rock partition. the ritual bath was itself converted into a cistern in a later period, likely during Byzantine times.

Burial cave

Only one burial cave was found at the site. It consists of ten loculi, and its facade has been largely destroyed. The existence of a single burial cave, combined with the site's overall small size, has led Klein and Zissu to propose that the settlement was a Jewish agricultural farmstead belonging to a single extended family or several related households. This settlement, in their view, existed from the Hasmonean period in the 2nd century BCE until the first third of the 2nd century CE.

== See also ==
- Al-Mughayyir, Ramallah
- Alexandrium
- Khirbet Jib'it
- Khirbet el-'Ormeh
- Khirbet el-Qutt
- Shiloh

== Bibliography ==
=== Sources ===
- Conder, Claude Reignier; Kitchener, Horatio Herbert (1882). Palmer, Edward Henry; Besant, Walter (eds.). The Survey of Western Palestine: Memoirs of the Topography, Orography, Hydrography, and Archæology. Vol. II. London: Committee of the Palestine Exploration Fund. p. 395.
- Finkelstein, Israel; Lederman, Zvi; Bunimovitz (1997). Highlands of Many Cultures: The Southern Samaria Survey (The Sites). Ramat Aviv: Institute of Archaeology, Tel Aviv University. p. 747.
- Klein, Eitan; Zissu, Boaz (2010). Billig, M.; Talmon, A. (eds.). "ח'רבת כולצון – אתר בדרום-מזרח השומרון משלהי ימי הבית השני ועד מרד בר-כוכבא" [Khirbet Kulason – A Site from the Second Temple Period and the Bar-Kokhba Revolt in the Toparchy of Acraba]. Judea and Samaria Research Studies (in Hebrew). 19. R&D Center, Ariel University: 95–112.

=== Further reading ===
- Raviv, Dvir; Stripling, Scott; Farhi, Yoav (2023). "New Findings from the Acrabat Toparchy and the Northern Border of Judea before and after the Great Revolt" (PDF). Jerusalem Journal of Archaeology. 4: 108–136. doi:10.52486/01.00004.5. ISSN 2788-8819.
- Tavger, Aharon (2024). "Iron Age II and Persian-Period Wine Production in Southern Samaria: New Data from Archaeological Surveys". 'Atiqot. 114 3. doi:10.70967/2948-040X.1017. eISSN 2948-040X.
