= Al-Mughayyir, Ramallah =

al-Mughayyir
- Municipality type D (Village council)

Arabic transcription(s)
  - Arabic: المغيّر
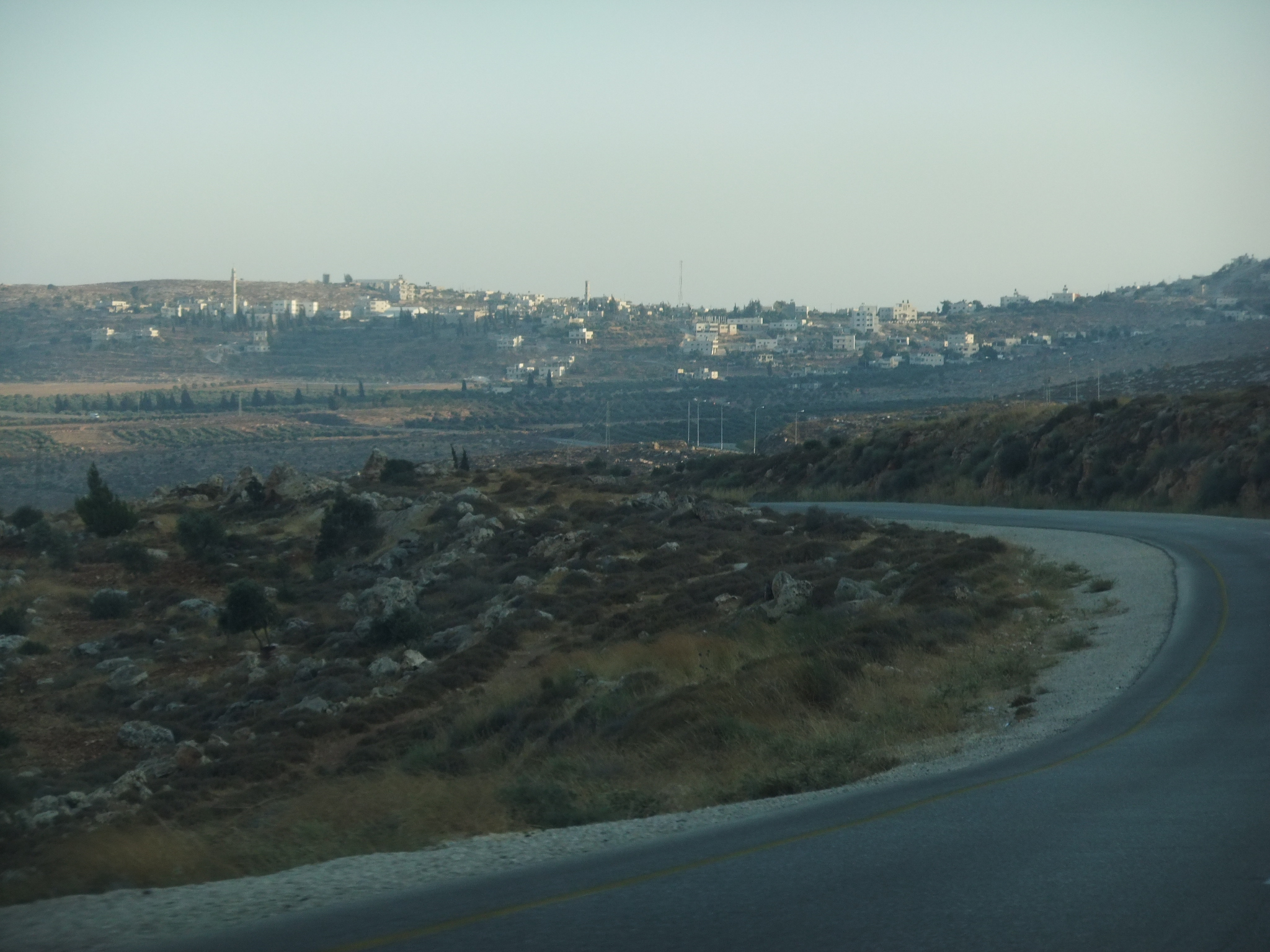
- The village of al-Mughayyir in July 2012

- Location of al-Mughayyir within Palestine
- Coordinates: 32°01′10″N 35°20′46″E
- Palestine grid: 183/158
- State: State of Palestine
- Governorate: Ramallah and al-Bireh

Government
  - Type: Village council

Population (2017)
  - Total: 2,872
- Name meaning: The caves

Al-Mughayyir (Arabic: المغيّر, lit. 'the changer'; sometimes transliterated Al Mughayer or al-Mughaiyir) is a Palestinian village in the Ramallah and al-Bireh Governorate, located 27 kilometers northeast of Ramallah and 34 kilometers southeast of Nablus, in the northern West Bank. According to the Palestinian Central Bureau of Statistics (PCBS), the village had a population of 2,872 inhabitants in 2017.

== Location and name ==
Al-Mughayyir is located 18.6 kilometres (12 mi) north-east of Ramallah. It is bordered by Fasayil to the east, Turmus Ayya and Khirbet Abu Falah to the west, Duma and Jalud to the north, and Kafr Malik and al-Auja to the south.

The name al-Mughayyir means 'the changer' and was given due to the continuously changing weather, a result of the village's location in a mountainous area above the central part of the Jordan Valley.

== History ==
The PEF's Survey of Western Palestine (SWP) found here "ancient cisterns, and a rock-cut winepress near the village, which is well built of hewn stone."

Potsherds from the Byzantine/Umayyad and Mamluk eras have been found here.

=== Ottoman period ===
In 1517, the village was included in the Ottoman Empire with the rest of Palestine, appearing in the 1596 tax-records as Mugayyir, located in the Nahiya of Jabal Qubal, part of Nablus Sanjak. The population was 7 households and 9 bachelors, all Muslim. They paid taxes on wheat, barley, summer crops, olive trees, occasional revenues, goats and beehives; a total of 4500 akçe. Potsherds from the early Ottoman era have also been found here.

In 1838 Edward Robinson noted al-Mughayyir was located in the Beitawy district, east of Nablus, while in 1852, he described the village as being of "considerable size", and built of hewn stones. He further noted that the villagers were "quite civil, and readily answered all our inquiries."

In 1870 Victor Guérin found "El-Merhaïr" to consist of a few houses and being largely deserted by its inhabitants, for lack of drinking water. He especially noticed a small mosque, which had a number of regularly cut stones that seem ancient. There were also several caves, dug in rock, which also seemed ancient. In 1882, the PEF's Survey of Western Palestine described it as "a small village of stone houses, on a ridge, with olives to the west, and beautiful corn-land in the Merj Sia. There is also corn-land on the north."

=== British Mandate period ===
In the 1922 census of Palestine conducted in 1922 by the British Mandate authorities, al-Mughayyir had a population of 179, all Muslims, increasing in the 1931 census when the village had a population of 204, still all Muslims, in a total of 41 houses.

In the 1945 statistics, al-Mughayyir (including Khirbat Jib'it) had a population of 290 Muslims, with total of 33,903 dunams of land, according to an official land and population survey. Of this, 361 dunams were plantations and irrigable land, 6,908 used for cereals, while 34 dunams were built-up (urban) land.

=== Jordanian period ===
In the wake of the 1948 Arab–Israeli War and the 1949 Armistice Agreements, al-Mughayyir came under Jordanian rule.

The Jordanian census of 1961 found 365 inhabitants.

=== 1967-present ===
Since the Six-Day War in 1967, al-Mughayyir has been under Israeli occupation.

==== Impact of the Israeli occupation ====
According to the Oslo II Interim Agreement signed between the PLO and Israel in September 1995, al-Mughayyir's lands were split between area 'B' and area 'C'. Approximately 1,934 dunums (5.9% of the village's total area) is classified as area B, where the Palestinian National Authority has control over civil matters and Israel continues to have overriding responsibility for security. Area B constitutes most of all inhabited Palestinian areas, including municipalities, villages and some refugee camps. The majority of the village's population resides in Area B which forms a small part compared to the village's total area. The rest of the village's area, constituting 31,121 dunums (94.1% of the total area) is classified as Area C, where Israel retains full control over security and administration related to the territory. In Area C, Palestinian building and land management is prohibited except through consent or authorization by the Israeli Civil Administration. Most of the lands lying within Area C are agricultural areas and open spaces, in addition to Israeli military camps. According to villagers 75% of its land has been confiscated for Israeli settlements, military bases and natural reserves.

On 12 November 2014, the al-Mughayyir mosque was damaged extensively when it was torched, reportedly by settlers in what was believd to be a price-tag attack. According to Haaretz journalist Chaim Levinson, it was the tenth such mosque subject to arson in Israel and the West Bank since June 2011, and no investigation has ever led to an indictment.

On the November 25, 2018, another price tag attack left eight cars damaged, and graffiti stating "Death to the Arabs", "Revenge", and "Price Tag".

==== 2019 killing ====
On January 26, 2019, 38-year-old local resident Hamdy Taleb Na'asan was shot in the back and killed, and 10 other Palestinians were wounded. The Israeli army believed that Israeli settlers from Adei Ad had fired the shots. The head of the al-Mughayyir village council told Haaretz: "We're not entirely sure who was hit by military fire and who was hit by settler (shooting), but there undoubtedly are some hit by the settlers, who had attacked the houses unprovoked." The Israeli settlers gave conflicting stories about how the disturbances started, but ended by telling that according to an Israeli hiker, claiming to stabbed, the altercation began some 200 meters from Adei Ad when three Arabs ambushed him and attempted to drag him to the village. The Israeli army expressed "doubts" that the teen was stabbed, while the al-Mughayyir villagers flatly denied it, and Yesh Din also said the settlers initiated the disturbances.

==== 2020 killing ====
In December 2020, Ali Ayman Abu Aliya, 13 years old, was killed during protests at the village against "the construction of a Jewish settlement in the occupied West Bank". Abu Aliya was hit in the abdomen during clashes with the Israeli army, where the army had used 0.22-inch calibre Ruger ammunition. The UN Middle East envoy, Nickolay Mladenov, described the killing as "shocking and unacceptable". According to the DCIP; "Ali did not present any threat to Israeli forces at the time he was killed".

==== Tree wars ====
According to The Economist in October 2009, 200 olive trees belonging to villagers from al-Mughayyir were felled by settlers from the illegal settler outpost at Adei Ad, near Shvut Rachel. October is harvest time for olives and is often a time of "tension between Palestinian farmers and Jewish settlers", and The Economist tied the destruction of trees to the settlers' 'price tag policy.

"Many of the settlers pursue a “price-tag policy”, deliberately instigating violence and mayhem so that the Israeli military and political establishment is loth to take action, such as evacuating the 100-plus “illegal” settlements, for fear of further violence. As international criticism has mounted, even in America, several Israeli governments have promised to dismantle the outposts but so far little has been done. The settlers are generally against the peace process, because it could mean their expulsion. So whenever there are signs of negotiation, they increase their attacks—among other things, on olive trees. They want to show who controls the land."

— The Economist

In her 2009 publication entitled Tree Flags, legal scholar and ethnographer Irus Braverman describes how Palestinians identify olive groves as an emblem or symbol of their longtime, steadfast agricultural connection (tsumud) to the land.

"More than 80,000 Palestinian farmers derive a substantial portion of their annual income from olives. Harvesting the fruit, pressing the oil, selling and sharing the produce is a ritual of life."

In January 2019, twenty-five 35-year-old olive trees were cut down by vandals who left vehicle tracks leading to the nearby Israeli outpost of Mevo Shiloh, but no disciplinary action was taken by Israeli authorities.

==== April 2024 settler rampage ====
On April 12, during the April 2024 Israeli settler rampages following the killing of Benjamin Achimeir, settlers surrounded the village and about 500 of them (according to the head of the village council) broke into it, burning houses and vehicles, including a fire engine that was called to deal with the fires, and attacking residents with shots and stones. A resident of the village, 26-year-old Jihad Abu Alia was killed and 25 residents were injured in the attack. According to eyewitnesses, military forces arrived at the scene but did not try to stop the attack. The next day the village was attacked again and three of its residents were injured, one of them seriously.

April 2024 settlers attack

A house and cars set on fire by settlers after the attack

Aftermath of settlers attack on a sheep pen

Aftermath of a garage and a residence set on fire

Aftermath of settlers attack on al-Mughayyir, April 24

==== May 2025 settler violence ====
Om May 18, Hilltop Youth settlers built an illegal outpost 100 meters from the village. The settlers harassed and threw stones at the Palestinian villagers as they tried to take their belongings and dismantle frames of their houses in the presence of police and soldiers who did not intervene.

On 2 March 2026, settlers blocked the entrance to the village removing Palestinian flags, and attacked a shepherd. Soldiers who arrived at the scene fired tear gas toward residents who attempted to push the settlers back. The following day, settlers and soldiers reportedly set up a checkpoint at the village entrance shortly after the daily fast ended. According to reports, a settler struck a 55-year-old man with a stick while he was being held at the checkpoint. Paramedics who attempted to treat him were also attacked by settlers or soldiers. The injured man required ten stitches to his head.

==== 2026 settler and IDF violence ====
On 16 January, Following settler attacks, the IDF raided the village and attacked worshipers leaving Friday prayer. The IDF killed a 14-year-old boy who according to the IDF had attempted to throw stones at a military vehicle. Video footage showed the assault of a disabled person during the raid. Following the incident, Israeli forces blocked the village’s only entrance until the following day.

On 21 April, armed settlers stormed the village school, shooting and killing a 14-year-old student and another 32 civilians. The IDF had made no comments regarding the incident.

On 11 July, Israeli settlers drove sheep onto Palestinian farmland and damaged crops. Israeli troops who came to the aid of the attackers fired on the residents. One Palestinian was shot in the thigh and two others were injured by rubber bullets. A ten-year-old child was struck in the head by a stun grenade.

On 2 September, two 19-year-old Palestinian boys were shot dead by IDF forces during an armed Israeli settler raid in the village.

== Families ==
Principal families in the village include Na'san, Abu Aliya, al-Hajj Muhammad, Abu Na'im, and Abu Assaf.

== See also ==
- Allon Road, Israeli highway passing east of the village
- Khirbet Jib'it – nearby archaeological site
- Khirbet Kulasun – nearby archaeological site

== Bibliography ==
- Barron, J.B., ed. (1923). Palestine: Report and General Abstracts of the Census of 1922. Government of Palestine.
- Conder, C.R.; Kitchener, H.H. (1882). The Survey of Western Palestine: Memoirs of the Topography, Orography, Hydrography, and Archaeology. Vol. 2. London: Committee of the Palestine Exploration Fund.
- Finkelstein, I.; Lederman, Zvi, eds. (1997). Highlands of many cultures. Tel Aviv: Institute of Archaeology of Tel Aviv University Publications Section. ISBN 965-440-007-3.
- Government of Jordan, Department of Statistics (1964). First Census of Population and Housing. Volume I: Final Tables; General Characteristics of the Population (PDF).
- Government of Palestine, Department of Statistics (1945). Village Statistics, April, 1945.
- Guérin, V. (1875). Description Géographique Historique et Archéologique de la Palestine (in French). Vol. 2: Samarie, pt. 2. Paris: L'Imprimerie Nationale.
- Hadawi, S. (1970). Village Statistics of 1945: A Classification of Land and Area ownership in Palestine. Palestine Liberation Organization Research Center. Archived from the original on 2018-12-08.
- Hütteroth, W.-D.; Abdulfattah, K. (1977). Historical Geography of Palestine, Transjordan and Southern Syria in the Late 16th Century. Erlanger Geographische Arbeiten, Sonderband 5. Erlangen, Germany: Vorstand der Fränkischen Geographischen Gesellschaft. ISBN 3-920405-41-2.
- Mills, E., ed. (1932). Census of Palestine 1931. Population of Villages, Towns and Administrative Areas. Jerusalem: Government of Palestine.
- Palmer, E.H. (1881). The Survey of Western Palestine: Arabic and English Name Lists Collected During the Survey by Lieutenants Conder and Kitchener, R. E. Transliterated and Explained by E.H. Palmer. Committee of the Palestine Exploration Fund.
- Robinson, E.; Smith, E. (1841). Biblical Researches in Palestine, Mount Sinai and Arabia Petraea: A Journal of Travels in the year 1838. Vol. 3. Boston: Crocker & Brewster.
- Robinson, E.; Smith, E. (1856). Later Biblical Researches in Palestine and adjacent regions: A Journal of Travels in the year 1852. London: John Murray.
