= Bar Kokhba hiding complexes =

Underground hideouts used by Jewish rebels

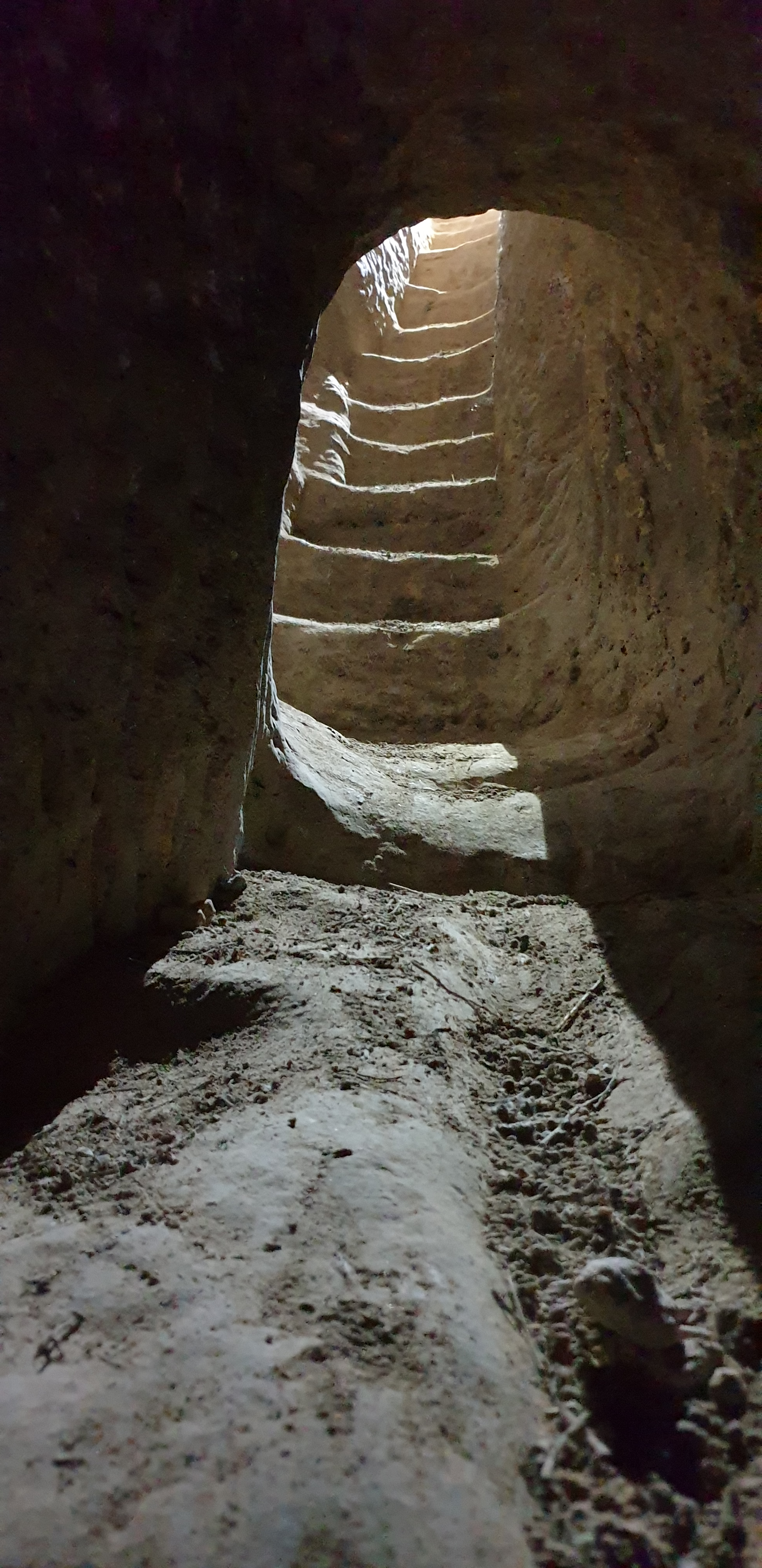
A staircase in a hiding complex at Khirbet el-Ein

The Bar Kokhba hiding complexes are underground hideout systems built by Jewish rebels and their communities in Judaea and used during the Bar Kokhba revolt (132–136 CE) against the Roman Empire. The hiding complexes are believed to have played a significant role during the revolt, particularly in Judea proper. Functioning as hiding places during times of emergency, these systems facilitated defense strategies and guerrilla warfare tactics. Researchers distinguish among the concealment complexes between those constructed in conjunction with the revolts, which include hiding complexes and cliff shelters, and a different category, the natural refuge caves used as ad hoc hiding places toward the end of the wars.

By 2005 hiding complexes had been identified in over 100 settlements across Judea, mainly concentrated in the Shephelah, Hebron Hills, and Beit El Mountains, with fewer in Galilee. Most of these complexes were strategically located beneath or near homes in settlements. Some were established in preparation for the revolt, while others were built during its course. A few of these structures, though smaller and less intricate, date back even earlier to the First Jewish–Roman War (66–73).

Carved into the rock – primarily the limestone and chalk typical for the region – the complexes comprised interconnected chambers linked by narrow passages. These complexes typically feature entrance shafts, rooms, halls, ventilation shafts, and various amenities such as locking mechanisms, lighting systems, sanitation facilities, and provisions for water storage. This architectural design allowed inhabitants to conceal themselves while maintaining essential functions for survival and warfare.

== Exploration and study ==
The refuge systems were known to locals for hundreds of years and were first systematically investigated by the Palestine Exploration Fund (PEF) in the 19th century. Their dating to the Bar Kokhba revolt was determined only in the late 1970s, and as of 2008, only a few of them have been thoroughly investigated. In the Shephelah, for example, less than a quarter of all known refuge systems have been examined and mapped. According to the researchers, most of these refuge complexes were used or prepared by Jews for times of distress, matching those during the revolts against the Romans in the Roman period.

=== Types and location ===
In total, over 300 concealment complexes were known as of 2011, discovered near about a hundred settlements and sites in the Shephelah, and in about thirty-five settlements in Galilee.

In a summarizing study published in 2019, Yinon Shivtiel summed up the research in Galilee and pointed to hundreds of what he calls "cliff shelters", and over 74 "hiding complexes" throughout the Lower Galilee that are identical to those in Judea.

== Background ==
About sixty years after the First Jewish–Roman War that led to the destruction of Jerusalem in 70 CE, Simeon bar Kokhba led yet another revolt, with the goal of expelling the Romans from the Land of Israel and rebuilding the Temple. The revolt lasted for three years, and initially the rebels achieved great success, even gaining the support of the sages of the generation, led by Rabbi Akiva. As time passed, the revolt was crushed. Hundreds of thousands of Jews were killed, and the Jewish community in the Land of Israel was destroyed.

The rebels operated mainly in the Shephelah and to a lesser extent in Galilee, and in the years preceding the revolt they engaged in comprehensive and serious planning. They collected weapons and hewed hiding complexes, in which they would live and from which they would go out to attack during the revolt, as described by the Roman historian Dio Cassius.

The hiding complexes served as bases for surprise attacks on camps of Roman soldiers, and also as hiding places in case of a Roman siege on the settlement. The rebels would emerge at an agreed upon day and hour, attack nearby legion camps, and flee back to their starting points. The assumption is that the "convenient places of the land" in Cassius' description are the hiding bases from which the rebels emerged quickly to seize important strategic positions, which gave them a significant advantage for continuing the fighting.

=== Sources, dating and location ===
Only two historical sources describe institutionalized hiding in the Land of Israel: the Jewish-Roman historian Josephus describes the Jews hiding from the Romans during the Great Revolt in the 1st century, and Cassius Dio describes their hiding during the Bar Kokhba revolt in the 2nd century. A meticulous review of the refuge systems shows that they are almost identical in their shape, size, and in the technology used by the hewers in both the Shephelah and Galilee, indicating the work of one guiding hand that built them. Their dating to the Bar Kokhba revolt relied on the historical testimonies, and especially on their location and the findings discovered in them.

All the hiding complexes in the Shephelah, and most of the systems in Galilee, were hewn into ancient underground complexes dated to the Hellenistic and Early Roman period, and were at least 100–200 years old when integrated into the refuge systems. The latest ones were hewn in the 1st century, meaning also before the Bar Kokhba revolt, perhaps from the time of the Great Revolt.

Potsherd and vessel finds in rooms and halls (not in tunnels) have all been typologically dated to the second half of the 1st century, and the first half of the 2nd century CE (between 50 and 150 CE), through comparison to similar ceramic and stone vessel finds from Jerusalem, Masada and the desert hideouts in the Judean Desert. For numismatic findings, see below under "Coins".

In the Shephelah, the hiding complexs stretch from the drainage basin of Nahal Modi'im and the Ayalon River in the north, to southern Shephelah and the slopes of Mount Hebron in the area of Gush Etzion. They stretch a strip about 70 kilometers long from north to south, with an average width of about 15 kilometers.

In Galilee, the area of the refuge systems is smaller, concentrated in eastern Galilee, from the Sea of Galilee in the east to the northern slopes of the Gilboa mountains in the south.

== Findings ==
The ceramic and numismatic finds (coins) in the hiding complexes are meager and disorganized, due to extensive antiquities looting.

=== Pottery ===
As mentioned in the "dating" section, much of the pottery findings have been dated based on their typology, as they were found to be similar to ceramic and stone vessels from Jerusalem and the Judean Desert dated to c. 50-150.

=== Coins ===
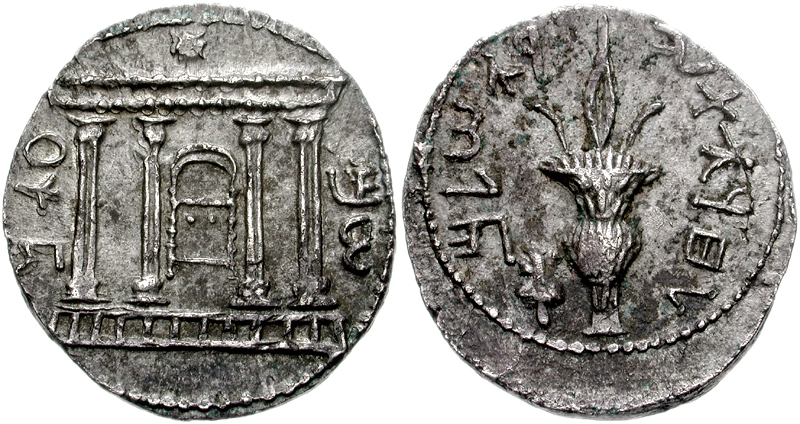
Bar Kokhba coins

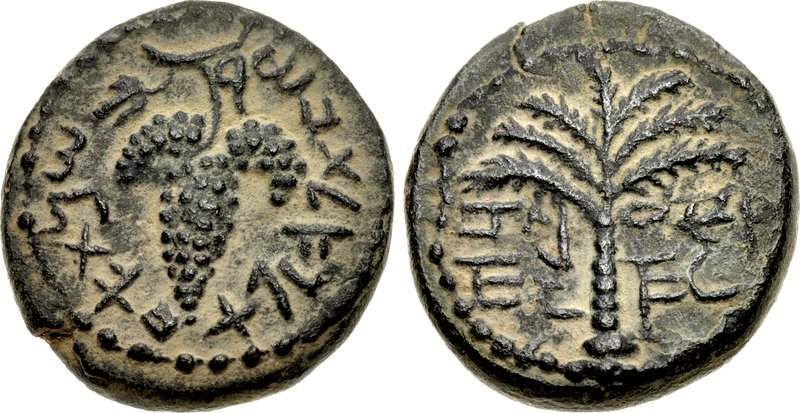
A different type of coins

Dozens of coins have been discovered in the hiding complexes, the vast majority from the various years of the Bar Kokhba revolt (the year of the revolt appears on each coin). Many coins from the Bar Kokhba revolt have also been discovered in settlements under which hiding complexes were dug out, as well as Hellenistic, Hasmonean and Early Roman coins, all pre-dating the Bar Kokhba revolt. In some sites a small find of coins from the Great Revolt has also been discovered.

Many of the Bar Kokhba coins found in hiding complexes are actually "recycled Roman coins": the rebels overstruck Roman silver coins, thereby invalidating them. Such spolia has been found on coins of Emperor Nero and up to Hadrian, as well as local coins of Ashkelon and Gaza. Researchers Amos Kloner and Yigal Tepper believe that most Bar Kokhba coins that reached the markets following looting originate from the refuge systems, but this cannot be scientifically proven.

The relatively short period between the Great Revolt and Bar Kokhba Revolt makes accurately dating the installation of the hiding complexes difficult. However, the finds indicate they were certainly used during the latter revolt. Because of this, and because of the difference in historical descriptions between Josephus and Cassius Dio, most researchers believe that the hiding complexes were installed by Bar Kokhba's people, while a minority (Gideon Foerster for example) claim it cannot be proven that they did not reuse hiding systems from the time of the Great Revolt. In any case, all agree the refuge systems were used by Jews in their revolts against the Romans in the Roman period. Since hiding complexes have only been discovered under settlement remains and not between them, it can be deduced these settlements were Jewish at that time. Therefore, it is not surprising that some flourished and thrived until the 2nd century, and after that, probably following the revolt's suppression, suffered serious damage.

=== Weights ===
Weights known to have been used during the Bar Kokhba revolt indicate the existence of an orderly central government with an orderly administrative system. Of the seven weights found, six originated in the antiquities market, and only one was discovered in an archaeological survey, published by Amos Kloner. The lead weight was found in 1987 in an underground hiding complex at Horvat Alim near Beit Govrin. It weighs 803 grams, decorated with stylized roses and surrounded by an inscription in square Hebrew script: "Shimon son of Kosba, Prince of Israel and his redemption of Jerusalem". A rosette is depicted in the center of the weight. In the article, Kloner mentions another weight purchased in 1967 for the Eretz Israel Museum and stolen from there in 1976. The weight was around 400 grams. Until Kloner's finding of 1987, it was unknown that this weight belonged to the Bar Kokhba period. It too had an inscription in square Hebrew readable as "Shimon son of Kosba and his redemption of Jerusalem", with a rosette in the center.

== Construction strategy ==
Most of the Shephelah consists of soft chalk rock, covered by a hard crust called caliche, up to two meters thick. The soft chalk was very useful for Shephelah residents in all periods, especially the Hellenistic period, as it allowed them to quarry their building stones near the building site rather than in a distant quarry, reducing construction costs. To avoid unnecessary effort hewing the caliche layer, locals made narrow openings in it, expanding the hewn-out spaces once they reached the soft chalk. The unique structure of wide spaces with stable, narrow openings, allowed maintaining the chalk's moisture content, preventing its disintegration. These spaces, still abundant in the Shephelah, are called bell caves. These artificial caves were used by residents as storerooms and underground facilities for a wide variety of uses like cisterns, storage rooms, winepresses, columbaria, stables, and more. The extensive use of such underground facilities brought about thousands of caves and pits in the Shephelah area.

Bar Kokhba's rebels, many of whom lived in Shephelah settlements, used the underground facilities to create hiding complexes, as a sort of "secondary use". They sealed the openings of the original facilities, connecting them through tunnels and narrow passages, creating long systems based on existing cavities, which saved much time and effort. It also enabled camouflaging the hiding complexes under existing settlements, making it difficult for the Romans to track them.

Some of the earlier facilities were reused in their original capacity, like cisterns, storerooms etc. Other facilities underwent a change of purpose, serving the fugitives for various needs like assembly halls, living quarters, and so on. Expropriating earlier facilities for the refuge systems certainly disrupted the settlement's normal lifestyle, which indicates that the settlers cooperated with the rebels, who were determined in their war even at the cost of the ability to rebuild the settlement's normal life in the future.

== Constituent elements ==
Amos Kloner and Yigal Tepper, having researched many hiding complexes, comprehensively summarized their components into types:

=== Entrance shaft ===
In most hiding complexes, access was via a vertical entrance shaft, accessed only by ladder or rope. The entrance section was actually a winding tunnel, comprising a vertical shaft, short horizontal tunnel and second vertical shaft, so even if the refuge system's entrance was discovered by the enemy, immediate entry was almost impossible. In Galilee hiding complexes, the entrance shaft was hewn identically, despite the very different rock type there. The entrance shaft's efficacy was in neutralizing the infiltrating enemy, as the shaft's shape forced the entrant to shimmy twice down, hands and feet gripping the walls, unable to wield weapons or defend himself. The upper shaft's depth was usually that of the hard caliche layer, with the horizontal tunnel and second shaft hewn into the chalk layers.

Under the entrance shaft was usually a tunnel junction. Where two large earlier facilities were connected into one hiding complex, the entrance shaft was usually built between them. In large hiding complexes an actual room was built under the entrance shaft, from which tunnels branched in various directions. Researchers term this room the 'entrance chamber', and it is rare to find them in small systems.

=== Tunnels ===
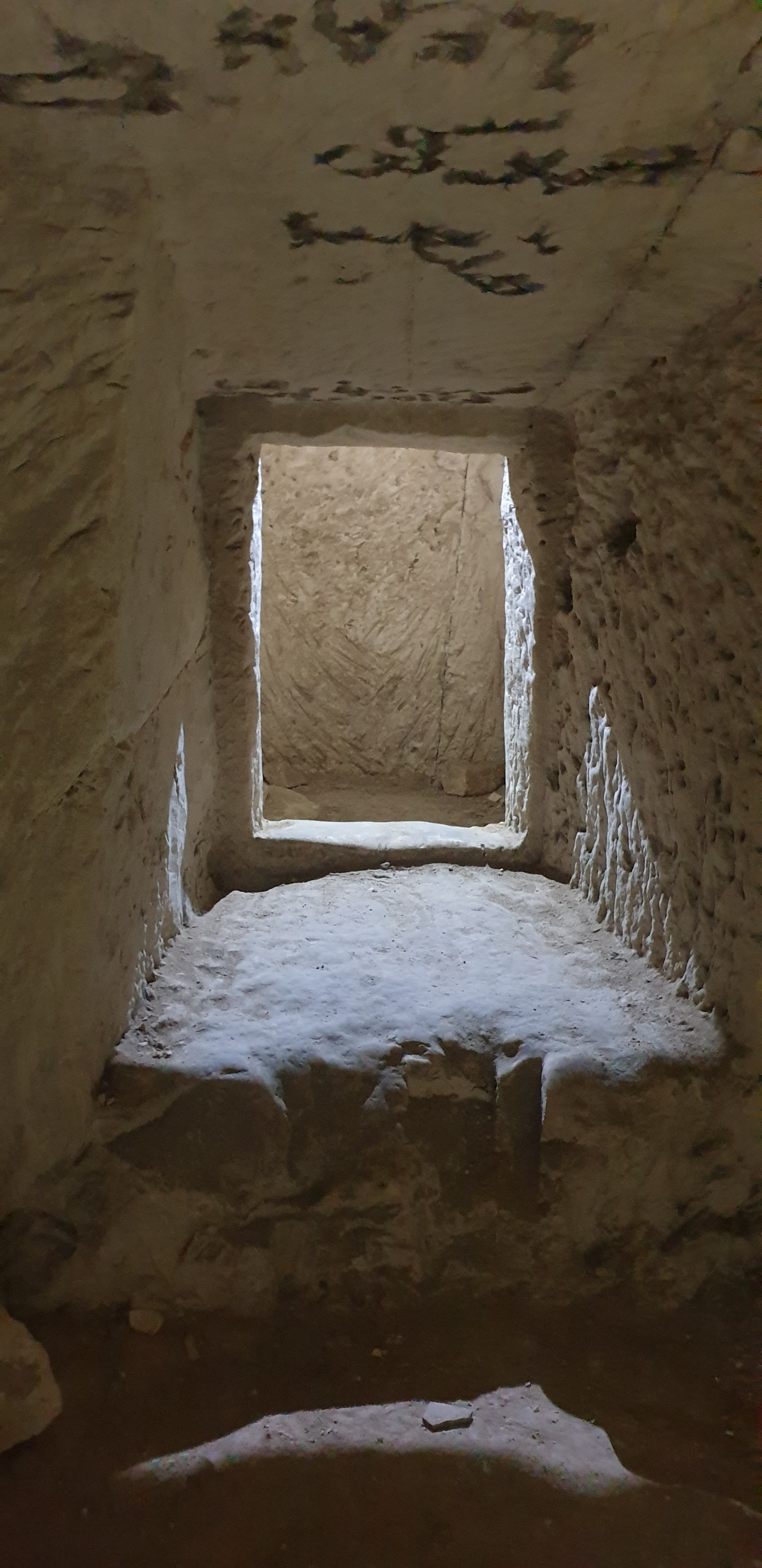
Hiding complex tunnel leading to a 90-degree turn

The tunnels were meant to connect the hiding complex's wings, comprising most of the system. The tunnels are low and narrow, requiring crawling on all fours. Only in exceptional cases can one crouch-walk through them. Their shape and dimensions are similar in most systems: generally horizontal, about 70x60 cm. Kloner and Tepper found that significant variations in tunnel width or height usually indicate either a narrow ventilation shaft, or a tunnel widened to incorporate a locking mechanism.

The tunnels were meant to connect various spaces, so their hewing involved very meticulous planning to make it as difficult as possible for a potential enemy. Their route is never straight, even when the hewers seemingly could have built a simple, straight tunnel between two spaces. Some include level differences via vertical passage shafts, which were utilized to incorporate locking mechanisms, or simply deep pits, lethal traps for one unfamiliar with the tunnel.

=== Rooms ===
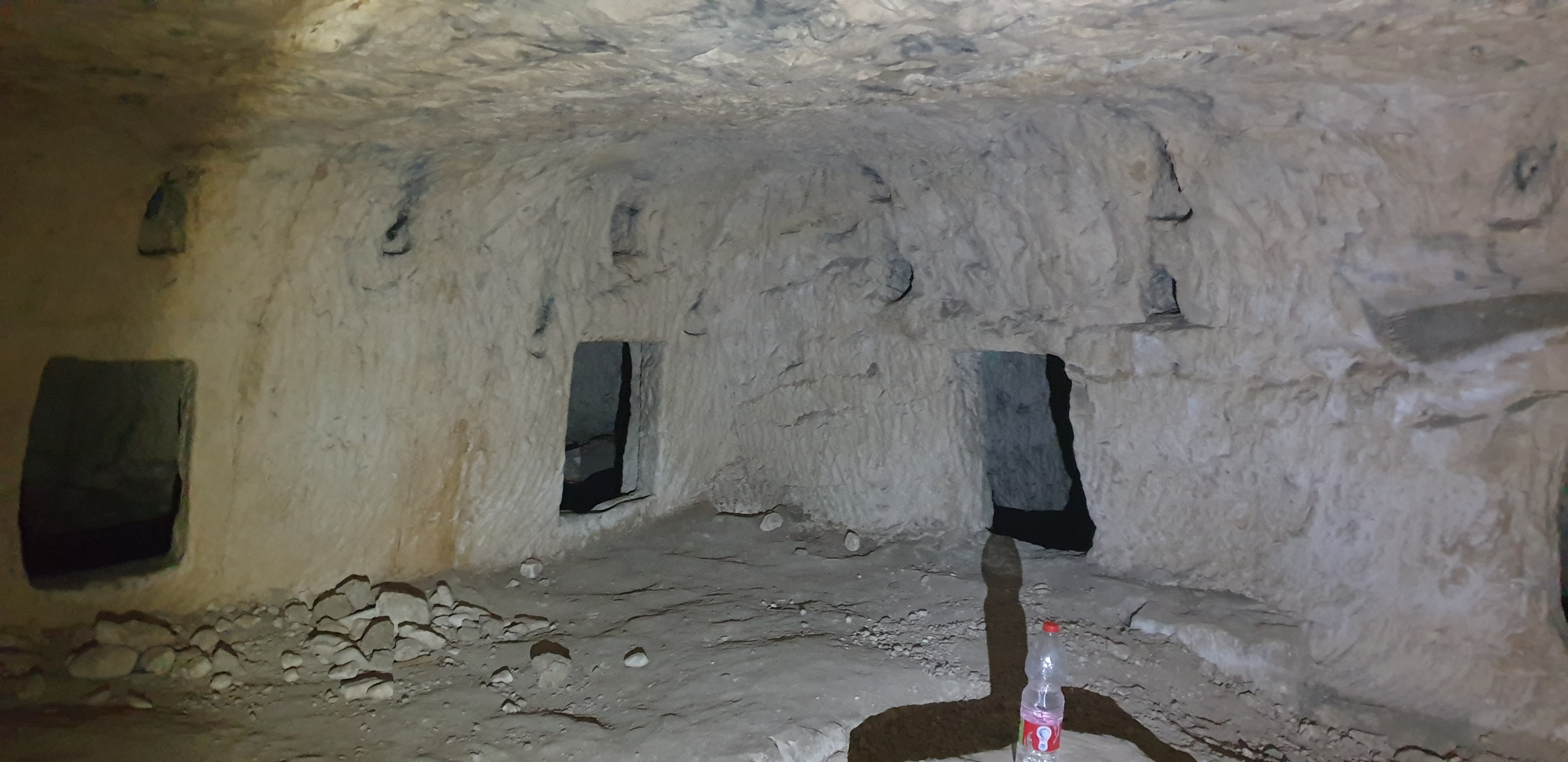
Inner room at Horvat Nakik with several exits and niches for oil lamps

The rooms are relatively wide spaces when compared with the tunnels, built as part of the whole system. They should be distinguished both from earlier facilities, incorporated into the complex in secondary use, and from the halls. In most cases, they served as living quarters and storage. Some were hewn in an orderly, aesthetically pleasing manner, others were hewn in a sloppy and hasty manner, apparently based on when they were hewed (the latter are seen as actions from the end of the revolt). The ceiling height in the rooms is approximately average human height, sometimes a bit lower. This height, in addition to the small area of the rooms, apparently reflects calculation of dimensions according to the minimal need for human habitation, sometimes to the point of stooped walking and standing. This calculation stemmed, apparently, from the need to conserve as much as possible the time and effort required to build the hiding complexes. There are hiding complexes with unfinished rooms, as well as complexes with blocked tunnels, leading nowhere ("blind tunnels"). Almost all the rooms in the refuge systems, whether used for dwelling or storage, had entrances hewn similar in shape to house entrances in the settlement above: a doorpost, a threshold stone, doorposts and sometimes even a locking mechanism for the door. The room walls clearly show recesses and niches for oil lamps, usually one or two lamps in each room.

In some of the rooms, hewn niches were found in the doorways on the right side – occasionally on the left – of what appear to be mezuzah cases. If this assumption is correct, then these are the earliest findings of affixing mezuzot in house and room doorways, predating the known findings from settlements in the southern Hebron Hills by several hundred years.

=== Halls ===
Some hiding complexes contain rooms larger than 15 square meters. These rooms were hewn by the rebels as part of the refuge system, and are not earlier facilities. The halls' ceilings are higher than the rooms' ceilings, allowing comfortable dwelling. Their lighting facilities are also far more abundant than in rooms, sometimes including hanging lighting fixtures, which lit up the entire hall. The halls apparently served for public gatherings of the refuge dwellers. In some complexes, earlier facilities such as winepresses or cisterns were appropriated as assembly halls. In almost all the hiding complexes the halls were built according to a uniform plan of shape and dimensions.

=== Ventilation tunnels ===
Any underground space used by humans or animals requires a ventilation opening. However, in earlier Shephelah facilities like underground winepresses, columbaria and dozens of animal rearing facilities, no ventilation installations or special openings were found, just air entering via the access openings. Researchers believe that the temperatures in underground spaces were far lower than outside, which helped avoid suffocation during prolonged stays there.

Because of this, the hewers of the hiding complex apparently did not originally install any special ventilation openings, since during the hewing, few people were in the systems, with the tunnel openings unblocked and uncamouflaged. It is assumed the rebels did not properly estimate the hiding complex's' capacity to contain such large numbers of fugitives without ventilation. The need for ventilation arose, therefore, only when the revolt erupted, as fighters and their families filled the hiding complex, blocking their openings, and lit oil lamps inside, which also consumed oxygen. Only then were makeshift passages breached from the underground complex to the surface, damaging the hiding complexes' security installations.

These passages can be easily identified, as they were hastily hewn, usually at the expense of the complex's original planning. An example can be found in the small system at Horvat Nakik, where a crude connection was made via a very narrow, 15 cm-diameter tunnel, from the complex's interior section to the ventilation shaft of the nearby public complex. In the public complex itself ventilation issues needed solving, and a passage was breached from the nearby columbarium connecting to the complex's central courtyard through the ceiling.

At Horvat Shem Tov, whose access was via a secured, sophisticated tunnel, a ventilation tunnel was breached from the entrance chamber to the ceiling of the inner room. Not a single locking mechanism was incorporated in this ventilation system, clearly hewn in haste and unplanned.

In contrast to the small hiding complexes, ventilation was not an issue at all in the large ones. The reason is the incorporation of large earlier facilities, mainly bell caves with camouflaged upper openings, obviating the need to block the tunnel openings exiting already. These facilities served as reserve "air tanks", enabling free air flow into the complex.

== Additional installations ==
=== Locking mechanisms ===
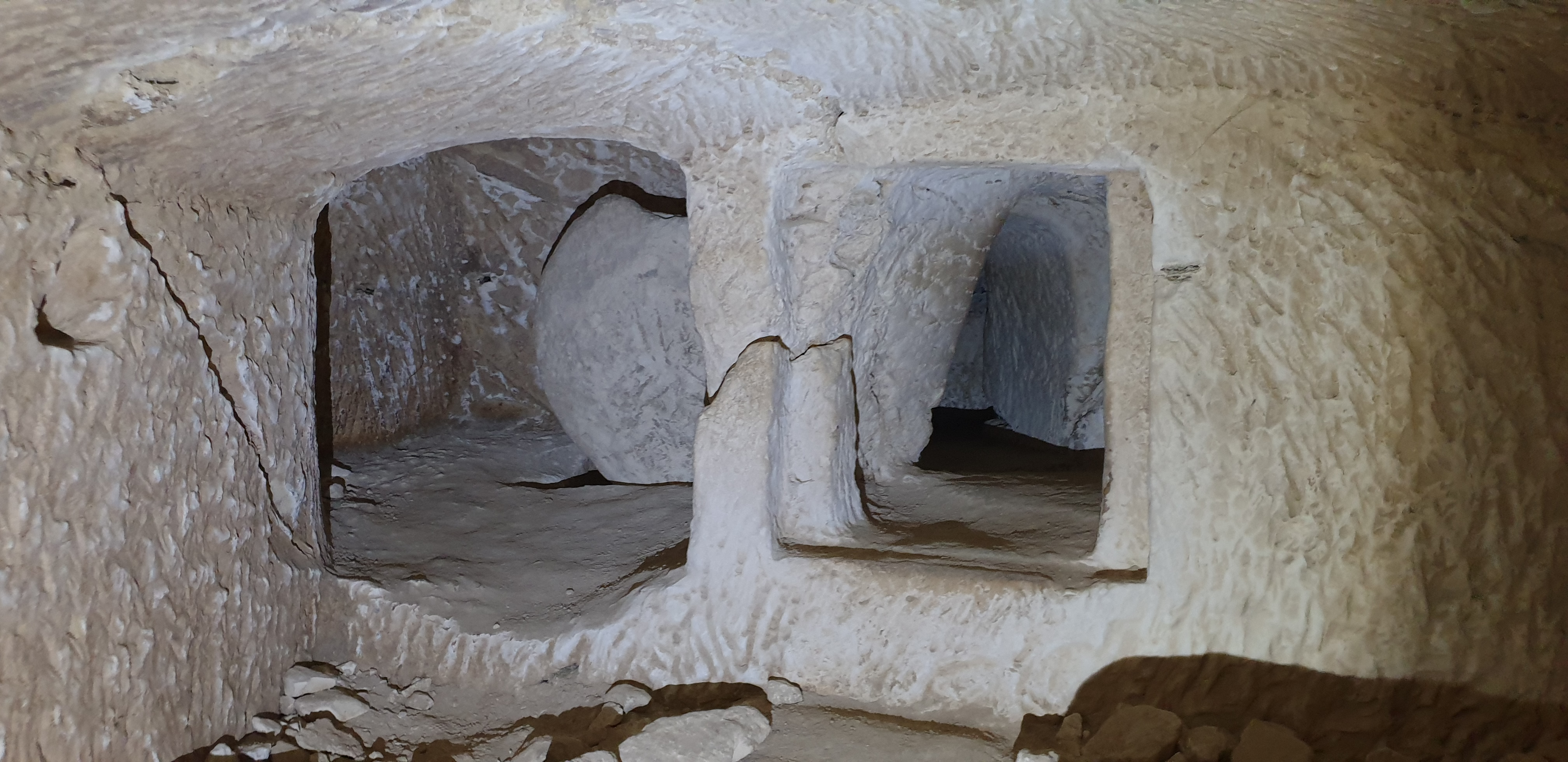
Locking mechanism, on the left hand side a round stone used to bolt the entrance

Locking mechanisms were safety measures, meant to prevent entry of strangers into the complex. Locking mechanisms appear in all the hiding complexes, and there were a few different types.

The simplest locking mechanism was a large stone slab, leaning on a sunken ledge to prevent it from falling inwards into the entrance shaft. The stone slab was usually camouflaged with smaller stones placed on top of it from the outside.

A bolt mechanism worked on the same principle to the simple locking mechanism, with the addition of an iron bolt attaching the stone slab to the inner ledge, instead of the external stones. Bolt mechanisms have been discovered in many refuge systems, mainly at entrances to inner rooms. Where simple locking mechanisms and bolt mechanisms were installed, recesses were hewn into the tunnel walls to place the stone slab and supporting stones so they would not obstruct the passage when unneeded.

A sophisticated locking mechanism, enabling the rolling of a round stone within a track across the opening, so it could not be made to fall forward or backward: Rolling mechanisms have mainly been discovered in the region at the entrance to Second Temple period burial caves, or as barriers for residential buildings or agricultural produce concealment facilities against thieves. Rolling mechanisms in the refuge systems primarily served to block passages from nearby tunnels to the surface.

Sometimes multiple types of locking mechanism can be found in the same refuge system, indicating the refuge system builders acted with extensive knowledge of locking techniques.

In small refuge systems, the locking mechanism was incorporated into the entrance shaft, effectively comprising the entire system's sole security measure.

=== Lighting facilities ===
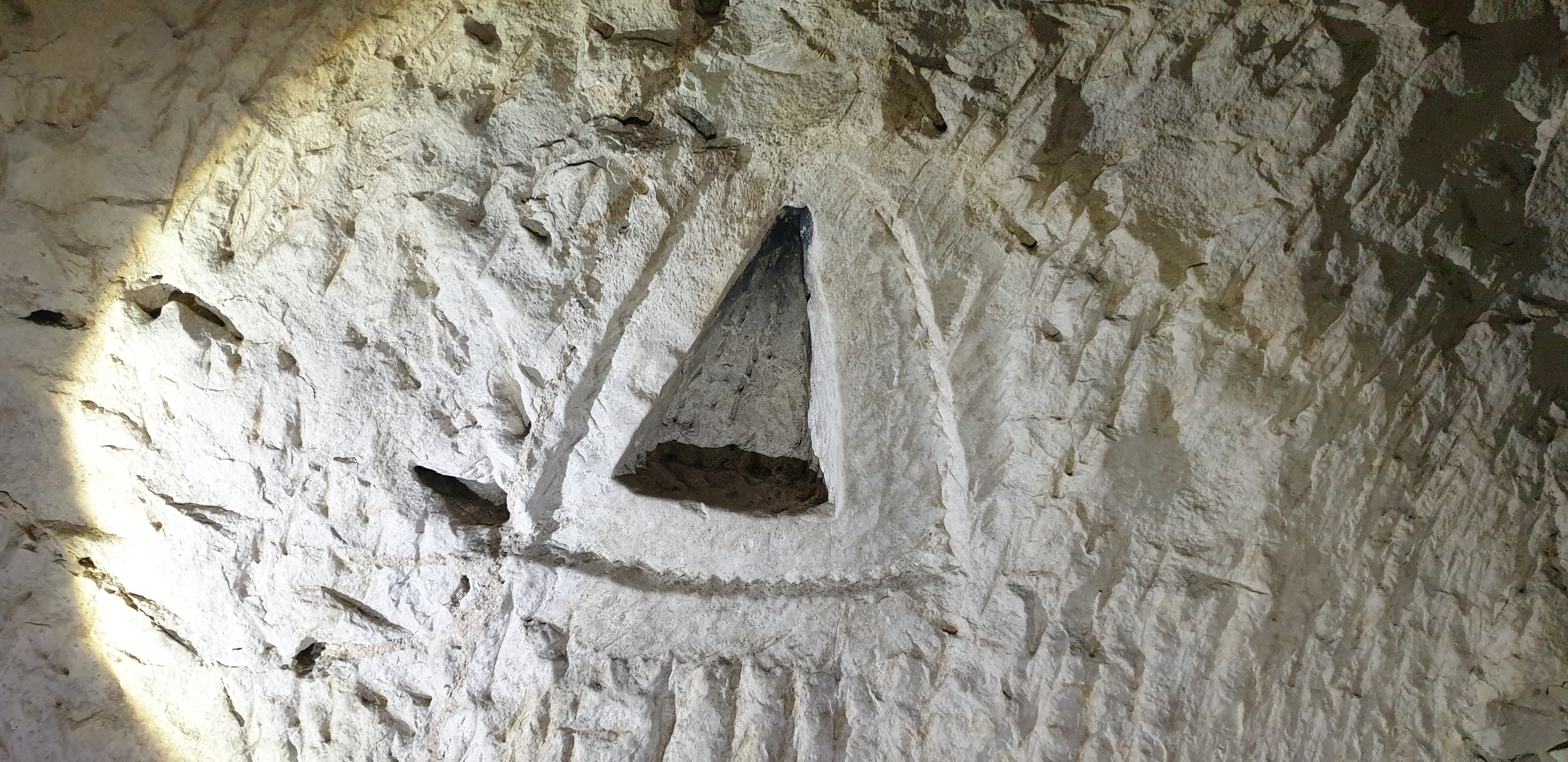
Rock-cut lighting facility

The hiding complexes, by their very nature, made lighting facilities essential at all hours. Cassius Dio, describing them, stated: "The Jews introduced light into the refuge systems via shafts, hewn specially for this purpose." No evidence has been found to substantiate this in the field, and it is clear the fugitives preferred using artificial lighting over exposing the hiding complex, even minimally, for lighting purposes. Lighting was done mainly using pottery oil lamps, the most popular lighting means in ancient times. Lamps were placed in recesses, hanging fixtures, and on protrusions.

Small niches in various shapes were hewn into the walls, with the lamp placed inside. Niches of this type were common for placing pottery lamps in homes and earlier underground facilities, with some differences: The niches in homes and earlier facilities were usually built or hewn in a precise, designed manner, some even decorated, whereas niches in the hiding complexes were hewn quickly and efficiently, without unnecessary decoration. In many hiding complexes, soot marks left by the lamp flame have been found. This important find makes it possible to determine if niches were used and for how long. The problem today, with the transformation of hiding complexes into tourist sites, is that many visitors place lamps in niches, erasing the original soot marks. Interestingly, as opposed to the rooms, where very few lamp placements were installed, numerous niches were discovered in the tunnels themselves in short distances from one another. The explanation for this phenomenon is that the niches in tunnels served the hewers: these worked under harsh conditions, hewing winding tunnels which soon left the lamp placement behind them. Because of this, the hewers had to carve new niches for themselves repeatedly.

In some of the earlier facilities incorporated into the hiding complexes and also in some of the halls, a sort of hollow ring was identified in the ceiling. It appears these rings were used to tie a large lighting fixture, perhaps a multi-wick lamp. The purpose of the hanging lighting fixtures was to illuminate the large space's center, and this may have been done already during the original use of the earlier facilities.

==== Use of lamps for orientation during construction ====
The lighting installation termed "protrusion" differs functionally from the installations described above. Ostensibly these are simple protrusions left during the hewing, to place a pottery lamp on, but it was found that there was line-of-sight between one protrusion and the next, meaning if a lamp was lit in one, it could be seen from the next protrusion. Researchers have hypothesized that these points of light served the hewers to create an especially extensive or large infrastructure, a sort of "lighting line", indicating location and level. In most of the hiding complexes there was no special importance given to the location of tunnels and rooms, but in branching systems there was fear of an unplanned breach into earlier facilities or other systems, or a need to precisely define a location in order to connect distant earlier facilities to one another. It is reasonable to assume this technique was known and accepted in hewing underground facilities in general, adopted by Bar Kokhba's hiding complex workers.

=== Sanitation facilities ===
Hygiene and sanitation solutions were an inseparable part of prolonged human habitation in enclosed spaces, all the more so with the large public living in the small spaces of the hiding complex. Surveys and archaeological excavations have not revealed any definitive sanitation facilities in the hiding complexes, and it is reasonable to assume that any relatively sidelined, detached room or distant earlier facility could have suited these needs. Sanitation facilities existed already in First Temple times as well as the Roman period, but only in the large cities, not villages and peripheral settlements.

=== Storage and hoarding facilities ===
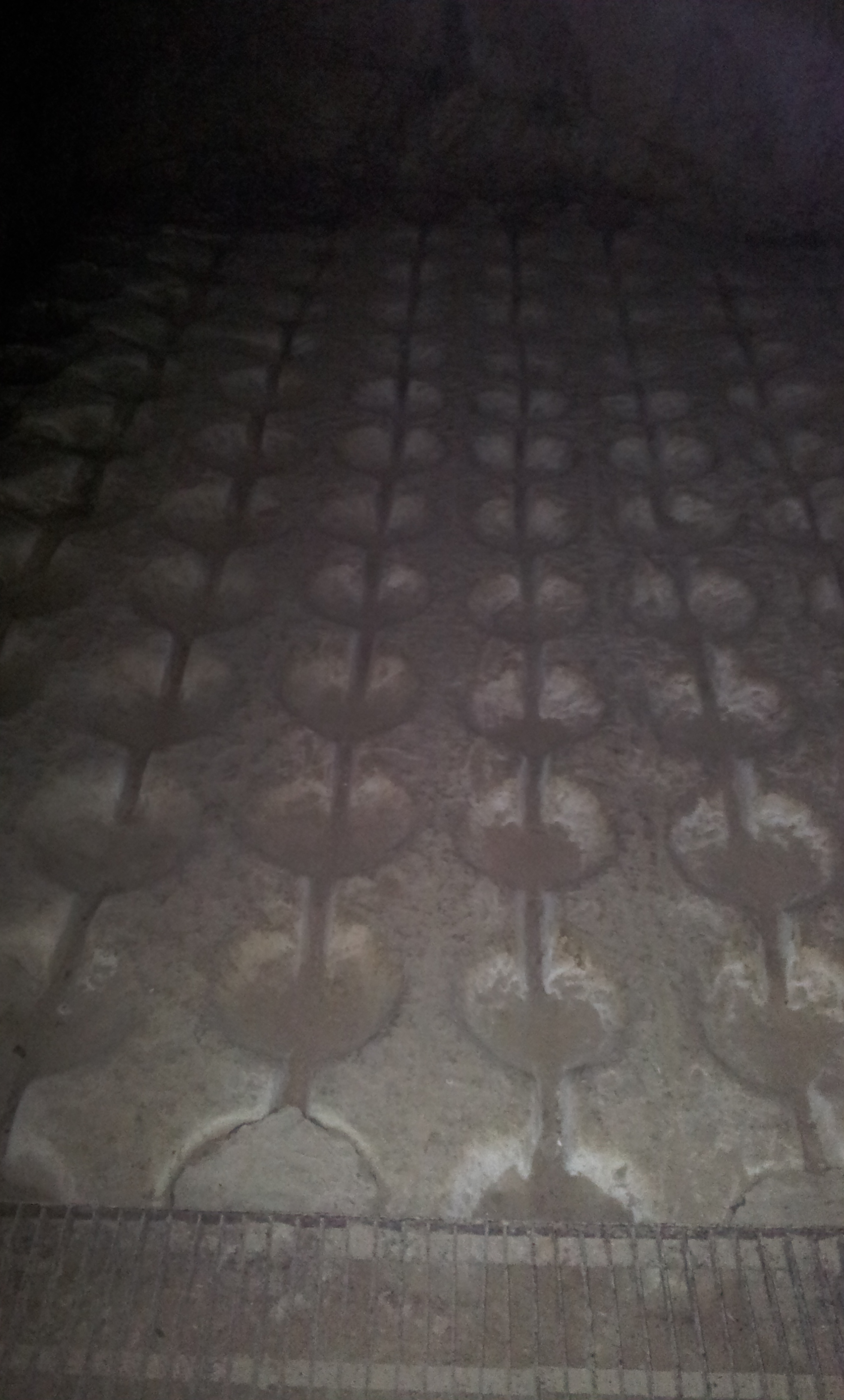
Storage room with sockets and tunnels at Hazan caves

Three types of facilities were used in the hiding complexes for storing food and agricultural produce: portable facilities, facilities hewn as rooms inside the complex, and earlier facilities, originally used to conceal agricultural produce or as storerooms. The portable facilities were mainly used in small hiding complexes, and numerous many storage jug remains have been found in most hiding complexes, far more than any other pottery vessels. The storage and hoarding facilities hewn as part of the system plan are nearly identical to regular living quarters, except for the very prominent lack of ventilation conditions vital for human dwelling. Sometimes these are such extremely sidelined, concealed rooms, it appears that even the fugitives in the complex did not know of their existence. Examples are the "armory" at Horvat Nakik, which may have served to conceal weapons; or the "niche room" at Horvat Eton, which perhaps served for concealing scrolls.

Earlier storerooms and facilities used to conceal agricultural produce from thieves were incorporated as they were into the hiding complexes. Characteristic of these are floors with depressions for placing jugs, and caves with bottle shaped niches hewn into their floors. It can be assumed that these facilities were hewn as part of the hiding complexes, but their ornamental hewing style, location and designed lighting fixtures reveal their original use.

=== Water supply ===
Water facilities in the hiding complexes were meant to store and supply water to the fugitives during the revolt. Earlier facilities were incorporated for this purpose, and reservoirs were also specially hewn during the establishment of the hiding complex. Sometimes the water storage facility was filled up before the revolt, and at other times an external runoff channel system was incorporated, perhaps for fear that the quantity collected in advance would not suffice. The method of water facility installation varied in the different systems, and solutions for local problems facing the workers: dealing with the type of local rock and topography, the ability to channel water through the entrance shaft or the locking mechanism, and the like.

The simplest water system was incorporating existing water facilities like cisterns and reservoirs, usually bell cisterns, previously used by the settlement, into the hiding complexes. To adapt them for fugitive use, their upper openings were blocked and camouflaged, and tunnel outlets leading to them were bored into their upper walls. This action cancelled the cistern's ability to store water from outside, so only water stored in them until their blocking served those hiding inside.

A distinction can be made between cisterns incorporated into the hiding complexes as water reservoirs, and those serving only as transit spaces and not as reservoirs, based on tunnel outlets in their walls; in the latter, tunnels were hewn in the cistern bottom rather than top, and the tunnel outlet's breach through the watertight plaster layer can be clearly seen, cancelling the cistern's earlier use as a water storage facility.

Various water facilities were specially hewn by the fugitives, including external and internal runoff systems. Such a water facility was surveyed and mapped at Horvat Zakari, where the tunnel channels water under the entrance shaft, splitting the flow into two channels: one to a tank hewn into the wall of an inner passage tunnel, and the other to a pit hewn into an inner room's floor. These two installations apparently served the entire complex. A similar water facility was discovered at el-Khirabe in the Galilee, where external runoff channels were hewn alongside an earlier water facility incorporated into the system.

== Hewing in the tunnels ==
=== Procedure, team work ===
Research indicates a method of digging the hiding complexes based on their size, integration of existing spaces and removal of hewn material. In the narrow tunnels one person worked, and at the start of the hewing the hewers had to lie on their stomachs or even their backs in various hewing sections, in tunnels and even rooms, until widening the hewn space. Apparently alongside each hewer was a team of assistants removing the hewn material backwards. In some cases shafts were bored through which material was brought out during the hewing, later blocked up with masonry. In a calculation made at one site where hewers used existing spaces, eight different simultaneous hewing points were found: two entrances from a bell cistern, three entrances from a columbarium cave and three entrances from shafts later blocked up.

=== Duration ===
Researchers estimate a 100-meter complex was completed within around a month of work, and complexes including large rooms and halls were hewn over several months. At another, smaller site with a single surface entrance, it was found that the main tunnel hewing could have been completed within about ten weeks, with other hewers concurrently carving out the rooms in parallel, the bottleneck being the removal of material via that single tunnel, which lengthened the time required to complete the hiding complex preparation.

The existence of the many extensive hiding complexes raises many questions, including – how did the rebels manage to hew such a large, ingenious amount of refuge systems in such a short time? In the early 1990s, an experiment was conducted near Beit Guvrin, where teenagers were asked to hew a chalk tunnel, 1.5 meters deep, about 60 cm wide and 80 cm high. Despite the amateur hewing and young age of the volunteers, they accomplished the task without particular difficulty within a mere three hours. The experiment proved that carving out the hiding complex did not require much work, as the soft rock was simple to hew.

=== Concealing waste material ===
Another question was: how did they conceal the limestone and chalk waste, without the Romans noticing?

Sample testing conducted on the periphery of hiding complexes revealed hewn chalk pieces scattered in a wide arc across the entire area, indicating the hewers removed the material in small piles, spreading it across a broad area, apparently at night. The hiding complex at Horvat Eked, carved out of limestone, posed a problem, as the white limestone fragments stand out from afar. The mystery's solution was found when researchers located low piles of rock shards and hewing remains behind a low wall in the fields. The assumption is the hewers erected the wall to conceal the limestone shards from Roman eyes during the day, spreading them out at night.

== Roman siege methods ==
=== Theory: suffocation ===
The accepted explanation for the Roman victory is that they located the ventilation openings, lit bonfires near them and directed the smoke inside the complexes, until oxygen depletion killed the rebels or forced them out to surrender.

=== Blocking exits ===
However, at Horvat Eked, a hiding complex entrance was found blocked by large limestone boulders, laboriously dismantled from a nearby building. Inside the system one human skeleton and a coin from year 3 of the Bar Kokhba revolt was found. In the Yattir area, a blocked refuge system was discovered, containing several skeletons of elderly, women and children, trapped apparently by the Romans.

== Conclusion ==
Many hiding complexes remain unexamined, therefore it is difficult to know if the rebels suffocated from smoke or were buried alive. In any case, it appears after suppressing the revolt the Romans allowed Jews to collect their dead from inside the refuge systems for burial, so today it is impossible to know the number of deaths and precise circumstances.

== List of sites ==
=== Hiding complexes ===
==== Galilee ====
- Beth She'arim, Areas A, C, D
- 'En Mahel, eastern slopes of Nazareth Hills
- 'Enot Sho'im
- Geva' Parashim (Tel Shush? Identification is disputed, not clear what Shivti'el means.)
- Gush Halav (Giscala)
- Horbat Huqoq: 1) at the synagogue, 2) at a mikveh
- Horbat Merot synagogue complex
- Horbat Ruma/Khirbet Ruma (Ruma/Tell Rumeh?)
- I'billin
- Kafr Kanna
- Karm er-Ras
- Khirbet Hazzur
- Khirbet Khuwweikh
- Migdal ha-'Emeq
- Mount Hazon
- Zippori: 1) citadel complex, and 2) SW of citadel
- Kabul, Israel

==== Judaean mountains ====
- Al-Arroub
- Khirbet Almit
- Khirbet Kelafa
- Kiryat Arbaya
- Khirbet el-Maqatir
- Khirbet esh-Shuna
- Khirbet Jamjum
- Horbat Ashun
- Horvat Berachot

==== Samaria ====
- Khirbet el-Qutt
- Khirbet el-Marajim
- Khirbet Jib'it
- Khirbet Kafr 'Atiya
- Khirbet Kulasun
- Khirbet Nabbuh

==== Shephelah ====
- Hazan caves
- Horvat Burgin
- Horvat 'Eqed
- Horvat 'Ethri
- Horvat Eton
- Horvat Gad
- Horvat Midras
- Horvat Rafa'
- Khirbet el-Ein
- Tel Goded
- Tel Lavnin

== See also ==
- Archaeology of the Bar Kokhba Revolt
- Bar Kokhba refuge caves
- Rock-cut architecture
  - Erdstall, medieval European underground tunnel system
  - Rock-cut tombs in ancient Israel
  - Souterrain, underground structure of the European Atlantic Iron Age
