= Archaeology of the Bar Kokhba Revolt =

Material evidence for the Bar Kokhba Revolt (132–136 CE)

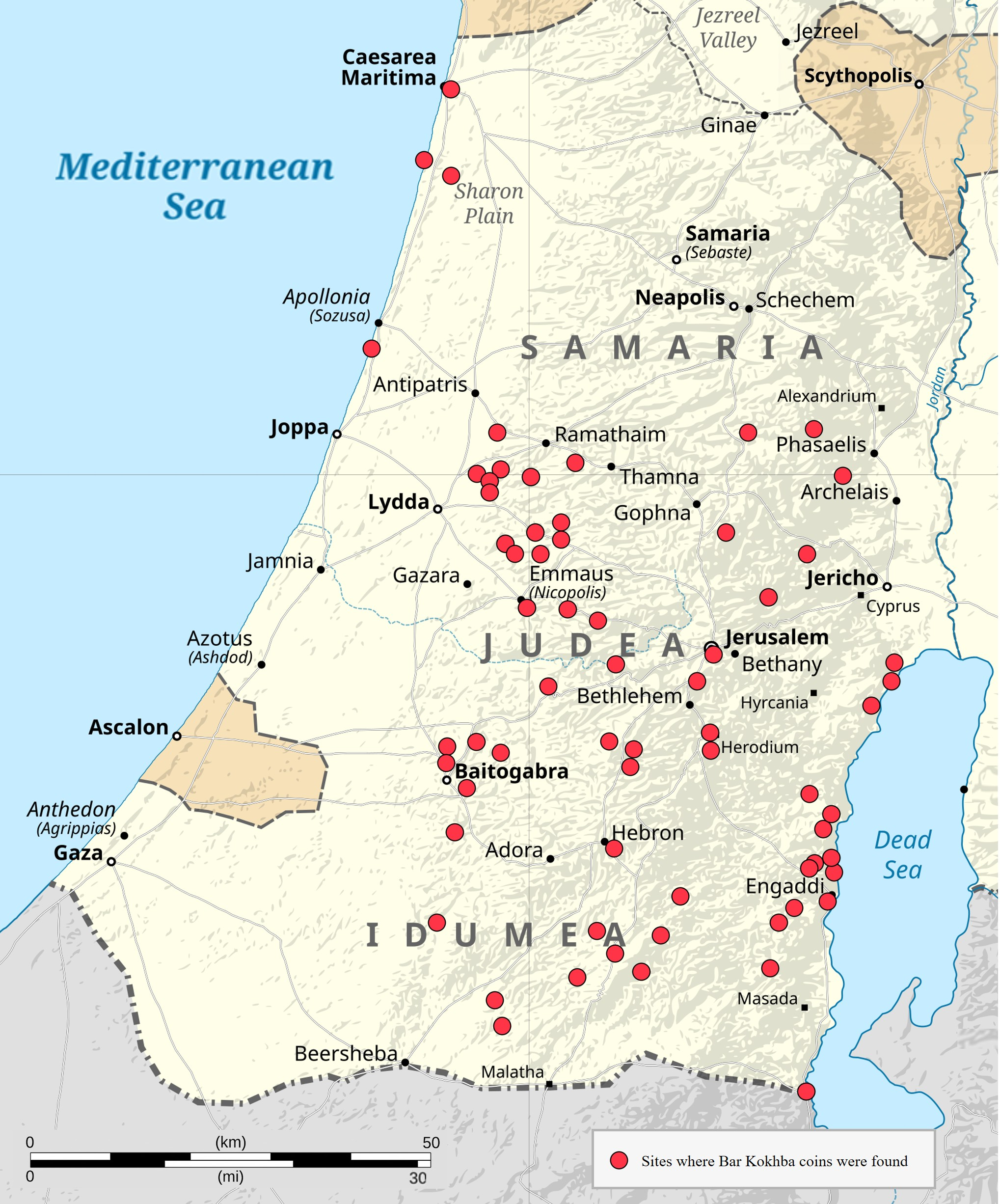
Geographic distribution of Bar Kokhba revolt coinage (2024)

The archaeology of the Bar Kokhba Revolt encompasses the archaeological evidence related to the Jewish rebellion against Roman rule in the province of Judaea from 132–136 CE. Archaeological discoveries, beginning in the mid-20th century, have transformed scholarly understanding of the Bar Kokhba Revolt, providing primary evidence where ancient written sources are fragmentary, biased, or silent on military and social detail. The expanding body of finds includes hiding complexes, refuge caves, destroyed settlements, siege works, coins, and documentary archives.

== Hiding complexes ==
Scholarly understanding of the revolt has been enhanced by the discovery of hundreds of hiding complexes: rock-cut networks located beneath ancient Jewish settlements. Their discovery aligns with Dio's description of the Jewish strategy of using underground passages to avoid open engagement. They were engineered by modifying existing infrastructure, including cisterns, ritual baths, and silos, and connecting them through networks of narrow tunnels and vertical shafts. To maintain secrecy, the builders sealed original entrances and carved concealed access points into the floors of houses. The tunnels also incorporated sharp 90-degree turns and internal locking mechanisms designed to disorient and trap Roman soldiers. Beyond their function as bases for guerrilla warfare, the complexes also sheltered civilians.

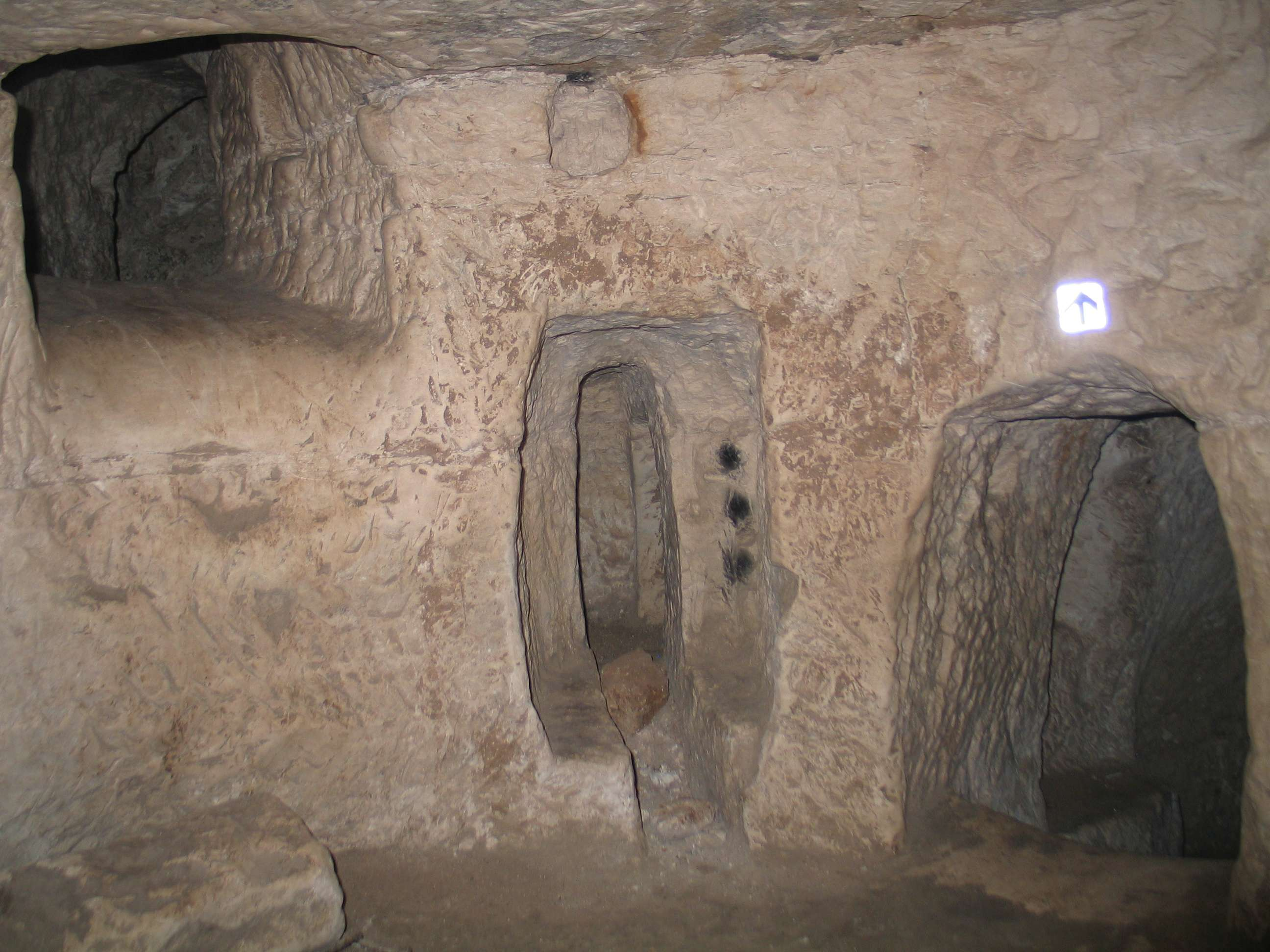
An underground hideout complex at Horvat Burgin, in the Judaean Lowlands

Hiding complexes have been identified across nearly every populated area in Judea and its environs. As of 2022, 439 complexes had been documented at 252 sites in Judea, of which 139 contain artifacts securely dated to the era starting from the end of the first revolt through the conclusion of the Bar Kokhba revolt (70–136). The absence of earlier artifacts in these systems suggests they were new constructions built in preparation for the revolt.

Archaeologists distinguish between "simple" complexes, some originating as early as the 1st century BCE, and "intricate" systems that reached their fullest development under Bar Kokhba. The most sophisticated networks are concentrated in the soft chalkstone of the Shephelah (Judaean Lowlands) and feature long tunnels, hiding chambers, and escape routes extending beyond settlement boundaries.

Approximately twenty hiding complexes resembling the well-developed systems of the Bar Kokhba Revolt have been identified in Galilee, a region located north of Judea, but still within the Roman province of Judaea. Found at sites such as I'billin, 'Enot Sho'im, Kafr Kanna, and Khirbet Ruma, and occasionally containing 2nd-century material, these complexes suggest that portions of the local Jewish population were preparing for conflict.

== Destroyed sites ==
Archaeological excavations in Judea have revealed widespread destruction layers and abandonment deposits dating to the revolt period, attesting to the near-total destruction of Jewish settlement in the region. These layers have been found in both above-ground structures and underground installations, including hiding complexes, burial caves, and storage facilities. At many sites, destruction layers are followed by a gap in settlement. While the evidence is strongest in Judea, more limited signs of destruction and abandonment have also been identified in Galilee and Transjordan.

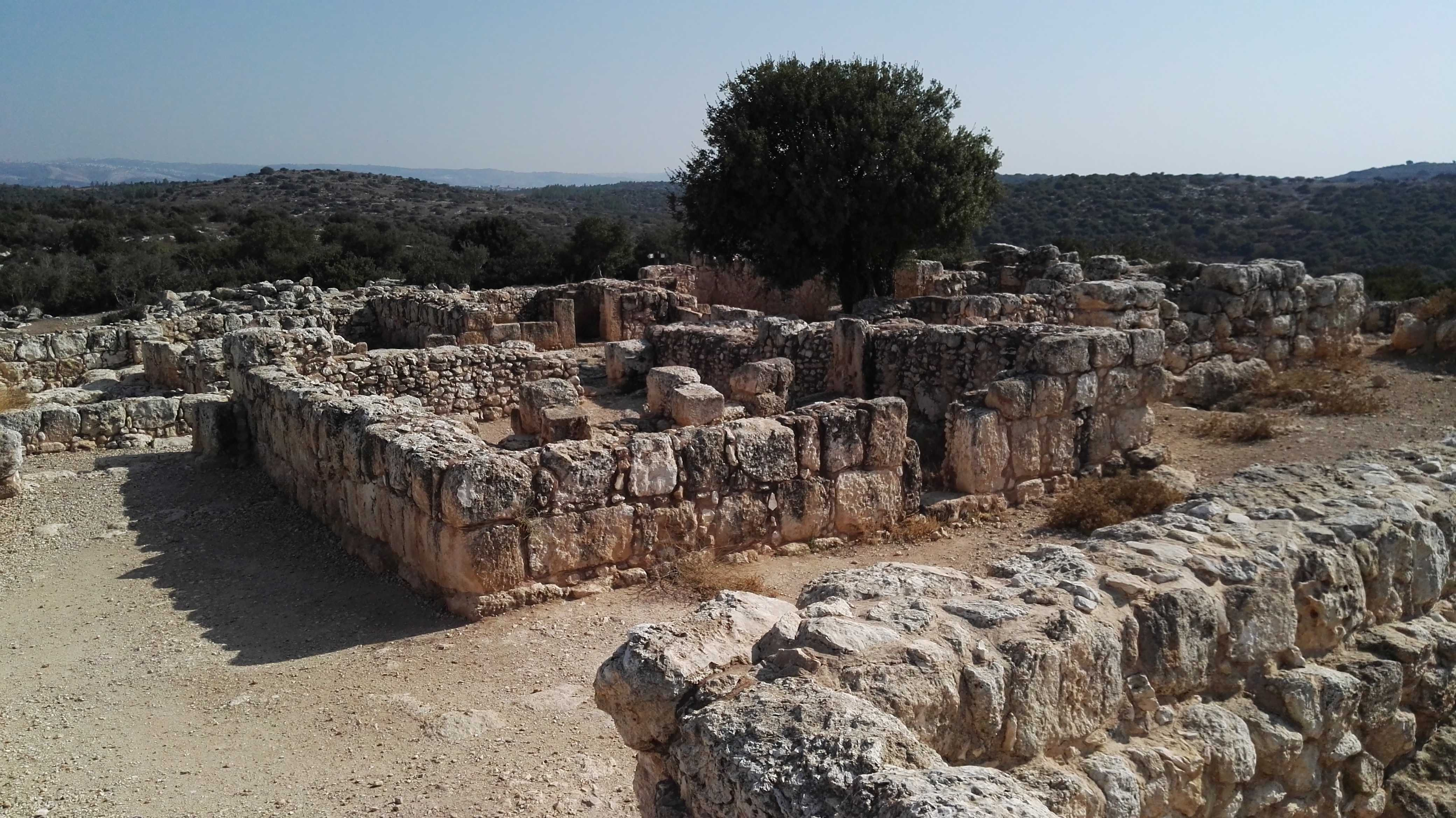
The ruins of Horvat 'Ethri display a destruction layer dating to the revolt, along with a mass grave containing the remains of 15 individuals, including one with signs of beheading

Excavations at sites such as Horvat 'Ethri and Khirbet Badd 'Isa have demonstrated that these Jewish villages were destroyed or depopulated in the revolt, and were not resettled until the 3rd century, when the new inhabitants were pagan. Finds from towns such as Gophna and Beit Nattif, known to have been Jewish before the revolt, indicate that pagans of Hellenistic and Roman culture lived there during the Late Roman period. In Horvat 'Ethri, a mass grave was discovered within a Jewish ritual bath (mikveh), and one of the individuals exhibited cut marks consistent with beheading by sword.

=== Betar ===
The town of Betar (also rendered Beitar, Bethar, or Bether), situated on the edge of a ridge in the Judaean Mountains, was selected as the rebels' headquarters owing to its strategic proximity to Jerusalem, its abundant springs, and its defensible position. Its ruins have been identified near the modern Palestinian village of Battir, which preserves the ancient name; the site is known in Hebrew as Tel Betar and in Arabic as Khirbet el-Yehud ("the ruin of the Jews"). It preserves archaeological evidence of the Roman siege, including fortifications and weaponry. Though no systematic excavation has been conducted, limited work by archaeologist David Ussishkin in 1984 (undertaken in response to antiquities looting and modern construction) revealed a hastily built fortification wall and a semicircular buttress, interpreted as signs of urgent military preparation. Two Roman siege camps were identified south of the site; the larger was almost entirely destroyed by construction beginning in the 1960s.

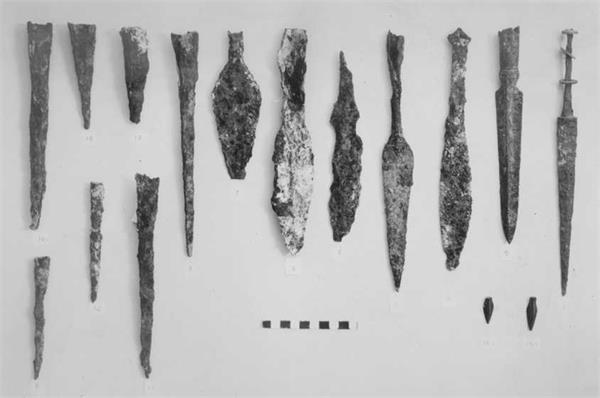
Weapons found at the ruins of Betar

Artifacts from Betar include slingstones, arrowheads of a type known from Bar Kokhba-era contexts in the Judaean Desert, and pottery dating to the first and second centuries CE. A concentration of 22 slingstones was found in situ on a tower roof, and their crude manufacture suggests they were produced quickly during the siege. A stone inscription bearing Latin characters, discovered at a nearby spring, mentions detachments from Legio V Macedonica and Legio XI Claudia. The inscription suggests that both legions, normally stationed in the Balkans, participated in the siege. No post-revolt occupation layers were identified, suggesting the site was abandoned following the Roman assault.

=== Herodium ===
Bar Kokhba's letters also show that the rebels used the Herodian palace-fortress of Herodium (named "Herodis" in the correspondence) as a regional headquarters and wheat supply depot. Excavations at the palace-fortress of Herodium have uncovered extensive foray tunnels constructed by the rebels for surprise attacks against Roman forces. Wooden beams from the original Herodian palace were dismantled and repurposed to reinforce tunnel roofs and passageways. Tunnels near the palace doorway and one of the towers feature fire-blackened surfaces, as well as arrowheads, slingstones, and collapsed walls.

== Tel Shalem ==
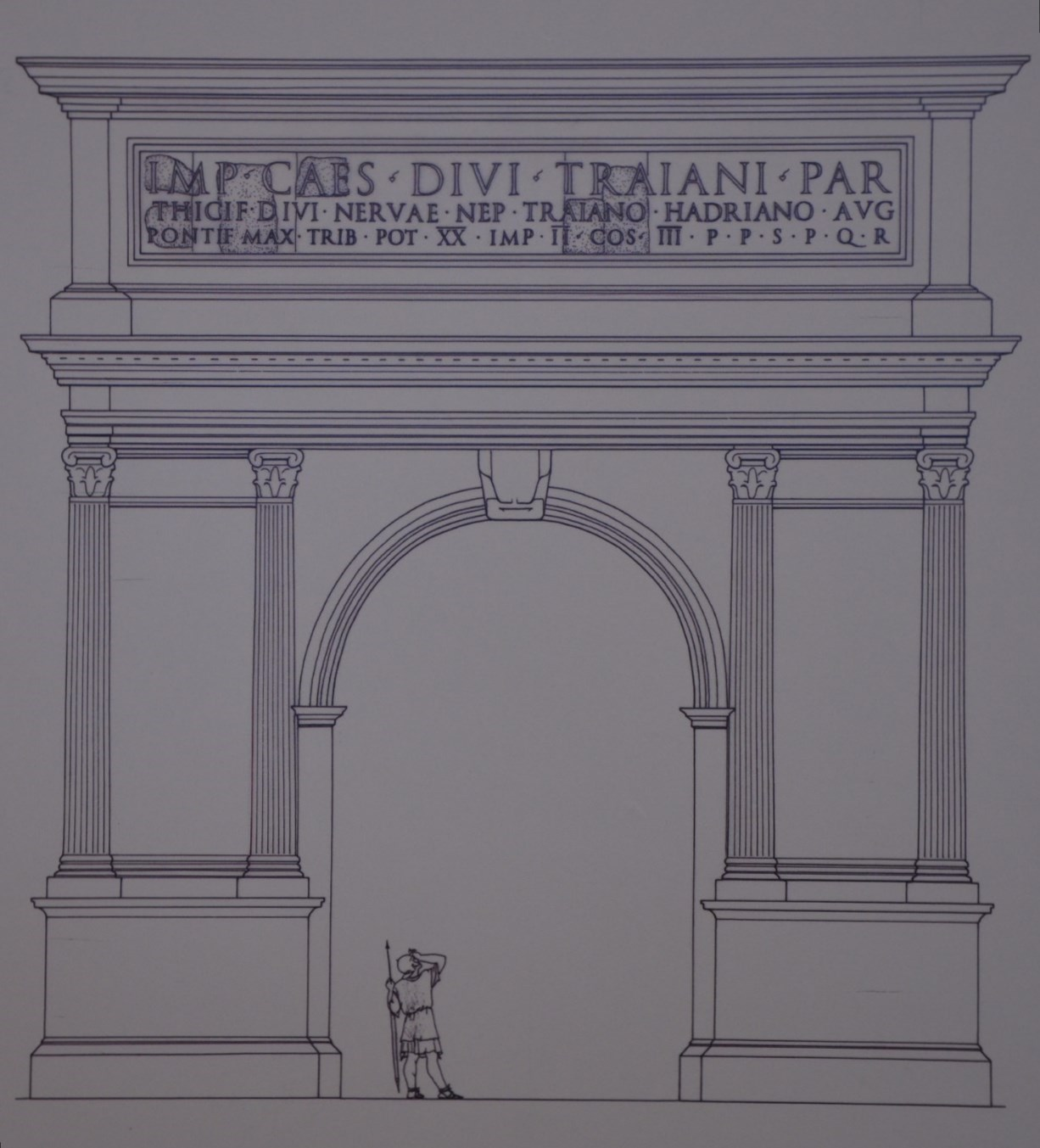
Schematic reconstruction of the Arch of Hadrian at Tel Shalem, celebrating either the Jewish defeat or Hadrian's 130 CE visit

Archaeological discoveries at Tel Shalem, a site in the upper Jordan Valley near Scythopolis (modern Beit She'an), have led researchers to identify it as a Roman fort active around the time of the revolt. The remains include a cuirassed bronze statue of Hadrian and a Latin inscription referencing a detachment of Legio VI Ferrata, suggesting the legion was stationed there during this period.

In 1977, a monumental Latin inscription dedicated to Hadrian was found reused in nearby late antique graves; its scale and epigraphic features suggest it once belonged to a triumphal arch. Gideon Foerster and Werner Eck have proposed that the arch was erected by the Senate following the revolt, with its location north of the revolt's center possibly reflecting a Roman victory in Galilee. This interpretation remains disputed: Menahem Mor and Glen Bowersock argued the arch instead commemorated Hadrian's visit in 130 CE. (Note: An alternative interpretation by G. W. Bowersock and Menahem Mor suggests the arch was an honorary monument erected by the camp's commander to commemorate Hadrian's visit to the region in 130 CE, prior to the revolt.)

== Refuge caves ==
During the revolt's final phase, many Jewish rebels and civilians sought refuge in natural caves, classified in academic literature as "refuge caves." More than 30 such sites have been identified, extending from Wadi er-Rashash and Naḥal Shillo in northern Judea to Naḥal Qina and Yahel, south of Arad. These sites are distributed across three north–south zones: the eastern escarpment near the Dead Sea, the central desert plateau and ravines, and the western Judaean Mountains. In some cases, Roman forces besieged the caves by blocking escape routes from the cliffs above, leading to the starvation of those trapped inside.

Excavations have uncovered a wide range of materials, well preserved by the arid climate of the Judaean Desert, including documents that shed light on the revolt as well as the period's languages, culture, and legal practices. Personal belongings such as property deeds, household keys, and luxury items, suggest the refugees intended to return to their homes. Additional finds include pottery, textiles, glassware, wooden artifacts, leather sandals, and food remains, which provide insight into aspects of daily life. Religious items were also discovered, including biblical scrolls containing texts from the Torah, the Prophets, and Psalms, a Tefillin headbox, strips of Tefillin scrolls, and a fragment of a Mezuzah scroll. Some scrolls showed evidence of intentional tearing, possibly by Roman soldiers after seizing the caves.

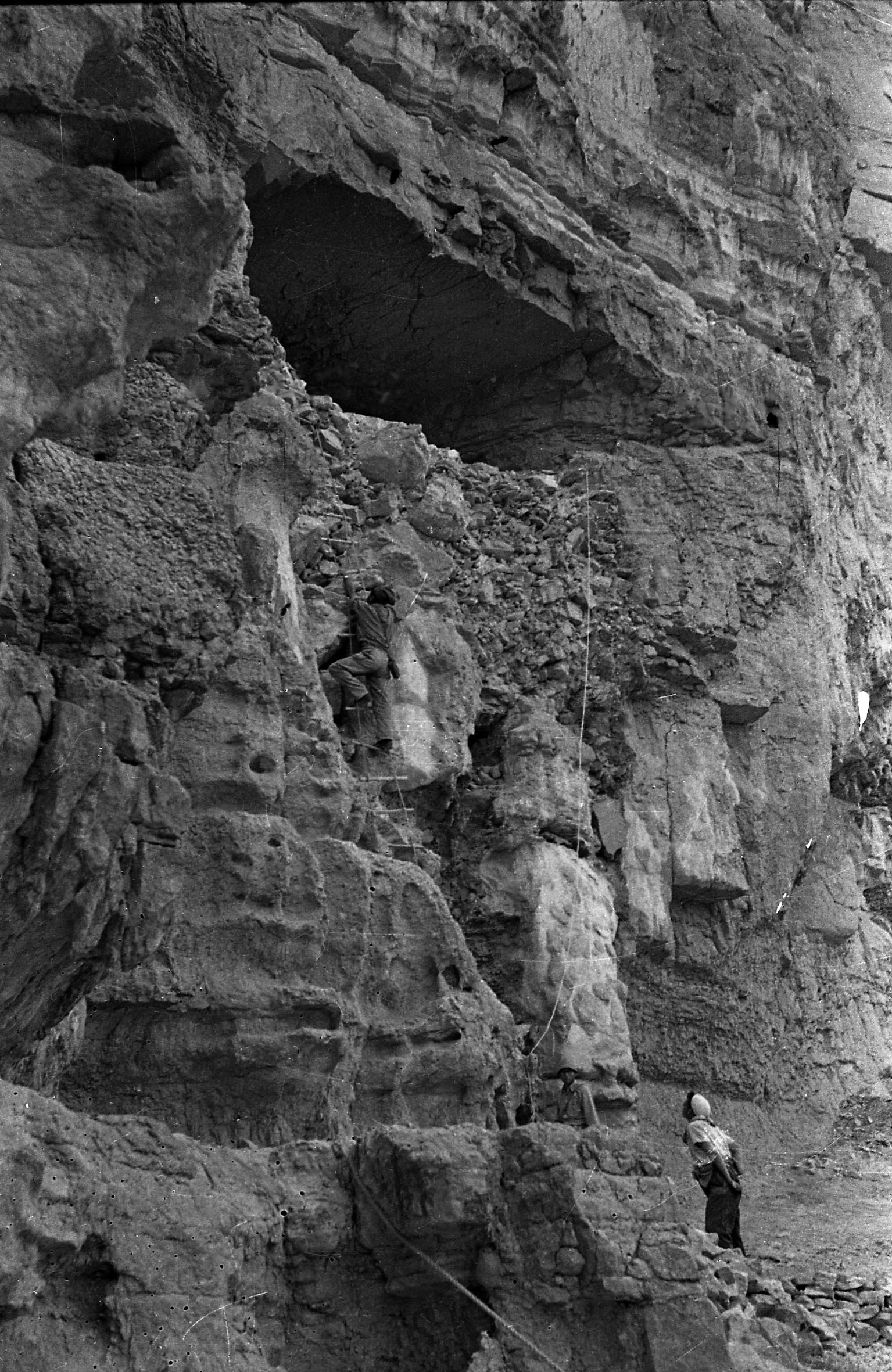
The Cave of Letters, where several documents of the period, including letters from Shimon bar Kokhba to the people of Ein Gedi, were discovered

The caves at Naḥal Ḥever, a canyon near the Dead Sea, are particularly notable for their archaeological significance. Among these is the "Cave of Horrors," named for the dozens of skeletons discovered within, including those of children and infants. This cave yielded revolt coinage, Hebrew ostraca bearing personal names, and manuscript fragments in Hebrew and Greek, including portions of the Minor Prophets.

The nearby Cave of Letters is one of the most important archaeological discoveries related to the revolt. Among the most significant finds was the archive of Babatha, a Jewish woman from the southern Dead Sea region. Her cache of 35 documents suggests she fled with hopes of survival but likely died in the cave. A second archive recovered from this cave is that of Salome Komaise, daughter of Levi, comprising 17 documents. Together, the two collections document property sales, marriage contracts, gifts, and legal disputes conducted under overlapping legal frameworks, and shed light on the rights of women in this milieu.

The Cave of Letters, together with caves at Wadi Murabba'at, yielded the "Bar Kokhba letters," a collection of at least 23 missives exchanged between the revolt's leader and his subordinates. These archives include Bar Kokhba's correspondence with Yeshua ben Galgula, commander of Herodium, and Jonathan ben Ba'ayan, commander of Ein Gedi. Written in Hebrew, Aramaic, and Greek, the letters reflect a multilingual population and suggest the presence of non-Jewish auxiliaries within the rebel ranks, as indicated by a reference to a person bearing the pagan name Hermas who, according to one letter, "is unable to (read and) write Hebrew."

The archaeological record continues to expand. In 2023, a hidden cache of Roman weaponry was discovered within the "Cave of the Swords" near the Ein Gedi oasis. During a survey at the site, previously known for a First Temple-period graffito, archaeologists found a pilum (javelin) head and four iron swords, three of which remained preserved in wooden scabbards with metal and leather fittings. The weapon typology, including Pompeii-type spathae and a ring-pommel sword, suggests a 2nd-century CE context. A bronze Bar Kokhba coin inscribed "for the freedom of Jerusalem," found at the cave's entrance, supports dating the cache to the revolt period. Scholars believe the weapons were likely captured from Roman soldiers and concealed by Jewish rebels for future use.

== Coinage ==
Coins overstruck by the Bar Kokhba administration serve as primary markers for both the rebels' political ideology and the state's geographic extent. As the majority of known specimens originated from illegal looting, those recovered during controlled excavations are of particular scientific value. By 2024, the distribution of these finds spanned the entirety of Judea—from the Beersheba region in the south to the Aqraba region in the north—indicating continued rebel activity in these areas into the revolt's third year. Within Judea, the southernmost discoveries occurred at Ein Bokek and the Naḥal Yatir site, while the northernmost were located at Tel Shiloh and the Wadi er-Rashash cave. Outside Judea proper but within the province of Judaea, specimens have been identified at four sites in the Sharon Plain, including Caesarea, Tel Michal and Mikhmoret; these are likely souvenirs retained by Roman soldiers, as evidenced by one coin found with a hole for use as a pendant. Similarly, the few coins found in Jerusalem and nearby sites such as Ramat Rachel were likely brought there by Roman forces.

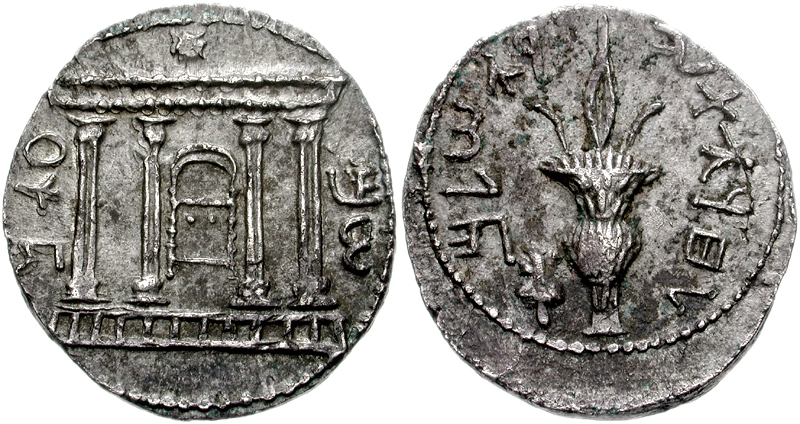
Bar Kokhba silver Shekel/tetradrachm. Obverse: the Jewish Temple facade with the rising star, surrounded by "Shimon". Reverse: A lulav, the text reads: "to the freedom of Jerusalem".

Twenty-four Bar Kokhba coins have been found in other provinces of the Roman Empire. Most were discovered near Roman installations (though not always in military contexts): one in Britannia (London), twelve in Pannonia (at Vindobona, Carnuntum, and Brigetio), and three in Dacia (at Sarmizegetusa, Ilișua, and Pojejena). The only specimen recovered from a civilian settlement was found in Zadar, Dalmatia. These coins may have been brought as souvenirs or spoils of war by Roman soldiers who served in Judaea, or alternatively by Jewish refugees or enslaved captives who reached these regions.

== Weights ==
The administration also produced official lead weights as an additional expression of independence. Seven such official weights are currently known: three bear inscriptions in the Paleo-Hebrew alphabet and four in the square Hebrew script. One specimen features a six-petaled rosette encircled by inscriptions naming Bar Kokhba as "Ben Kosba, Prince of Israel" and another individual, "Shimon Dasoi," identified as parnas—an official responsible for civil administration and economic regulation, particularly the oversight of weights and measures, comparable to the Greek agoranomos (market official).

== Post-revolt resettlement evidence ==
Artistic, epigraphic, and numismatic evidence indicates that Roman authorities resettled post-revolt Judea with a diverse population comprising several sources. Aelia Capitolina, administrative centers, and sites along major roads were settled by army veterans and immigrants from the empire's western provinces. The rural countryside of Judea was repopulated by migrants from the coastal plain and neighboring provinces, such as Syria, Phoenicia, and Arabia, along with settlers from the western part of the empire.

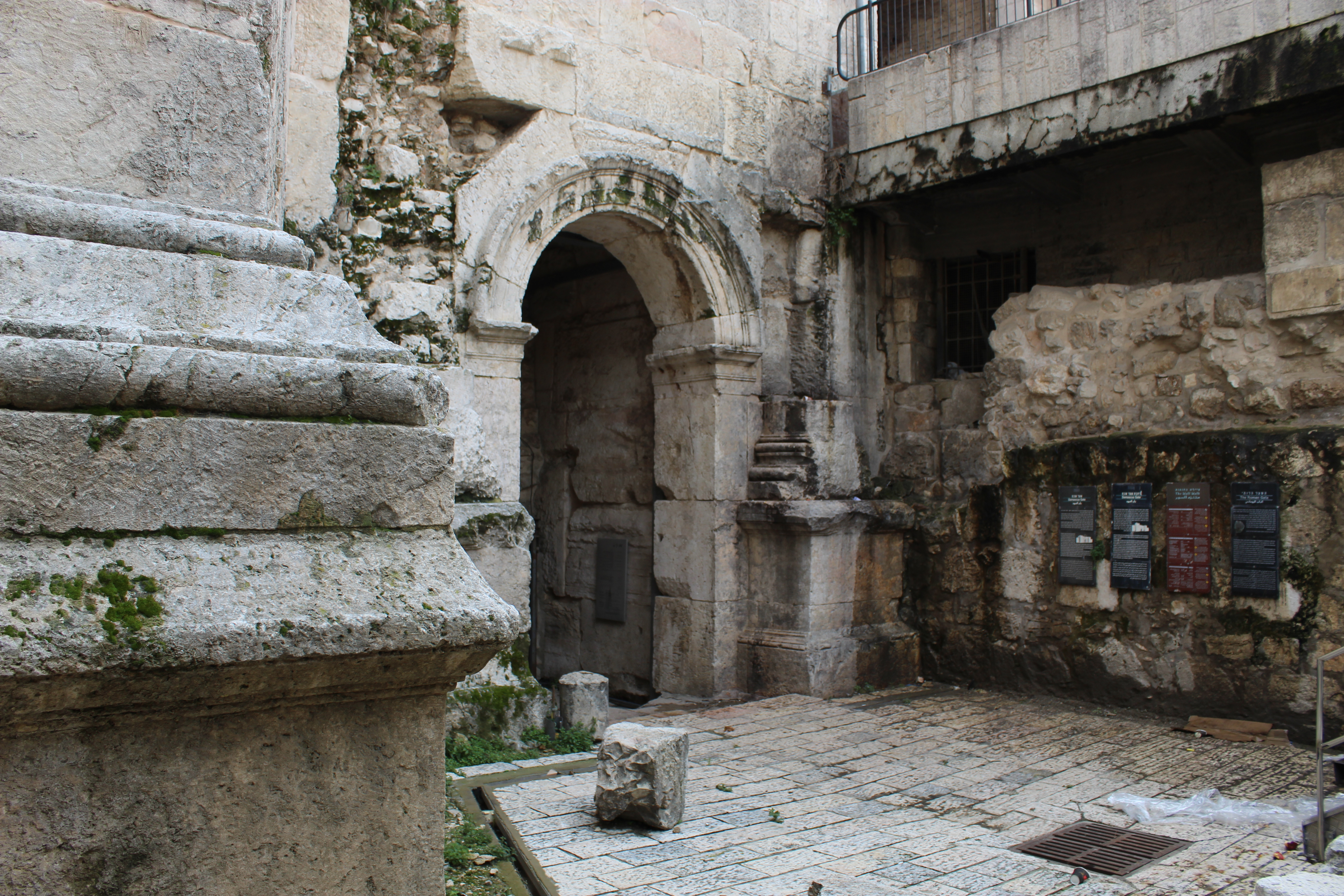
Late Roman-era gate beneath the Damascus Gate in Jerusalem

During the late Roman period, the hinterland of Jerusalem underwent a process of Romanization through veteran resettlement. Evidence includes a legionary tomb at Manahat, the ruins of Roman villas at Ein Yael, Khirbet er-Ras, Rephaim Valley and Ramat Rachel, and the kilns of Legio X Fretensis discovered near Givat Ram. Evidence of land confiscation and Roman veteran resettlement is also attested in Transjordan. Similar markers of veteran presence appear elsewhere in Judea, such as a marble Dionysus sarcophagus at Turmus Ayya, a Latin-inscribed tombstone at Khirbet Tibnah, and a statue of Minerva at Khirbat al-Mafjar. Additional finds include a centurion's tomb at Beit Nattif containing a statuette of Aphrodite and a Roman-style mansion with Western architectural elements at Arak el-Khala, near Beit Guvrin. The immigration of neighboring populations is attested by Oriental-style ceramic figurines found at Ben Shemen and Gezer, Phoenician-style burial architecture at Beit Jimal, Nabataean-style sculpture at Mamre, and the Mazor Mausoleum.

== See also ==
- First Jewish–Roman War#Historical sources

== Bibliography ==
- Aharoni, Yohanan (1962). "Expedition B — The Cave of Horror". Israel Exploration Journal. 12 (3–4). Israel Exploration Society: 186–199. JSTOR 27924906.
- Ameling, Walter; Cotton, Hannah M.; Eck, Werner; Ecker, Avner, eds. (2018-06-25). "LXXIII. Bethar (Bethther, Bettir, mod. Kh. el-Yahud) nos. 3197-3200". Iudaea / Idumaea, Part 1: 2649-3324. Corpus Inscriptionum Iudaeae/Palaestinae. De Gruyter. pp. 597–604. doi:10.1515/9783110544213-078. ISBN 978-3-11-054421-3.
- Arubas, Benjamin; Heinzelmann, Michael; Mevorah, David; Overman, Andrew (2019). "Capricorno Alae VII Phrygum … (i) Interim report on the fort near Tel Shalem". Journal of Roman Archaeology. 32: 201–213. doi:10.1017/S1047759419000114.
- Bar, Doron (2005). "Rural Monasticism as a Key Element in the Christianization of Byzantine Palestine". The Harvard Theological Review. 98 (1): 49–65. doi:10.1017/S0017816005000854. ISSN 0017-8160. JSTOR 4125284. S2CID 162644246.
- Cesarik, Nikola; Filipčić, Damir; Kramberger, Vlatka (2018). "Bar Kokhba's bronze coin from Kolovare Beach in Zadar". Journal of the Archaeological Museum in Zadar. 32 (32).
- Cotton, Hannah (1995). "The archive of Salome Komaise daughter of Levi: another archive from the 'Cave of Letters'". Zeitschrift für Papyrologie und Epigraphik. 105: 171–208. JSTOR 20189273.
- Doering, Lutz (2018). "Bar Kokhba Letters". In Brooke, George J.; Hempel, Charlotte (eds.). T&T Clark Companion to the Dead Sea Scrolls. Bloomsbury T&T Clark. pp. 289–294. doi:10.5040/9780567669858.ch-030. ISBN 978-0-567-66985-8.
- Eck, Werner; Foerster, Gideon (1999). "Ein Triumphbogen für Hadrian im Tal von Beth Shean bei Tel Shalem". Journal of Roman Archaeology. 12: 294–313. doi:10.1017/S1047759400018043.
- Eck, Werner (1999). "The Bar Kokhba Revolt: The Roman Point of View". The Journal of Roman Studies. 89. Society for the Promotion of Roman Studies: 76–89. doi:10.2307/300735. JSTOR 300735.
- Eshel, Hanan (2006). "The Bar Kochba Revolt, 132–135". In Katz, Steven T. (ed.). The Late Roman-Rabbinic Period. The Cambridge History of Judaism. Vol. 4th. Cambridge University Press. pp. 105–127. ISBN 978-0-521-77248-8.
- Eshel, Hanan; Zissu, Boaz (2019). "The Refuge Caves". The Bar Kokhba Revolt: The Archaeological Evidence. Jerusalem: Yad Izhak Ben-Zvi. pp. 62–64. ISBN 978-965-217-429-1.
- Gichon, Mordechai (1986). "New insight into the Bar Kokhba War and a reappraisal of Dio Cassius 69.12–13". The Jewish Quarterly Review. 77 (1). University of Pennsylvania Press: 15–43. doi:10.2307/1454444. JSTOR 1454444.
- Klein, Eitan (2011). Tavger, Aharon; Amar, Zohar; Billig, Miriam (eds.). "Gophna during the Late Roman Period in Light of Artistic and Epigraphic Finds" [גופנא בתקופה הרומית המאוחרת לאור הממצא האמנותי והאפיגרפי]. In the Highland's Depth: Ephraim Range and Binyamin Research Studies (in Hebrew): 119–134.
- Klein, Eitan; Gayer, Asaf; Ganor, Amir; Hamer, Hagay (2023). "Preliminary Insights following the Recovery of a Cache of Roman-Period Weaponry from the Cave of the Swords". New Studies in the Archaeology of the Judean Desert: Collected Papers: 453–479. doi:10.2307/jj.10329820.22. ISBN 978-965-406-774-4. JSTOR jj.10329820.22.
- Klein, Eitan (2024). יהודה משממה תקום: מבט ארכאולוגי על ארץ יהודה בתקופה הרומית המאוחרת [From Barren Land Judea Shall Rise: An Archaeological Perspective of the Land of Judea during the Late Roman Period] (in Hebrew). Ariel University Press. ISBN 978-965-7632-45-1.
- Magen, Yitzhak; Zionit, Yoav; Sirkis, Erna (1999). "Kiryat Sefer - A Jewish Village and Synagogue of the Second Temple Period / קרית-ספר - עיירה יהודית ובית-כנסת מימי הבית השני". Qadmoniot: A Journal for the Antiquities of Eretz-Israel and Bible Lands / קדמוניות: כתב-עת לעתיקות ארץ-ישראל וארצות המקרא (in Hebrew). לב (1 (117)): 25–32. ISSN 0033-4839. JSTOR 23681828 – via JSTOR.
- Magness, Jodi (2012). The Archaeology of the Holy Land: From the Destruction of Solomon's Temple to the Muslim Conquest. Cambridge University Press. ISBN 978-1-139-01383-3.
- Meyers, Eric M.; Chancey, Mark A. (2012). Alexander to Constantine: Archaeology of the Land of the Bible, Volume III. The Anchor Yale Bible Reference Library. Yale University Press. ISBN 978-0-300-14179-5. JSTOR j.ctt32brvs.
- Mor, Menahem (2016). The Second Jewish Revolt: The Bar Kokhba War, 132–136 CE. Brill. ISBN 978-90-04-31463-4.
- Porat, Roi; Kalman, Yakov; Chachy, Rachel (2016). "Excavation of the approach to the mountain palace-fortress at Herodium". Journal of Roman Archaeology. 29: 142–164. doi:10.1017/S1047759400072081.
- Raviv, Dvir; Ben David, Chaim (2021). "Cassius Dio's figures for the demographic consequences of the Bar Kokhba War: Exaggeration or reliable account?". Journal of Roman Archaeology. 34 (2): 585–607. doi:10.1017/S1047759421000271. ISSN 1047-7594.
- Raviv, Dvir; Zissu, Boaz (2022). "Judean hiding complexes: a geographical, typological and functional update (Israel)". Opera Ipogea. 2: 39–54. doi:10.57588/SSIOI22022/39-54 (inactive 20 May 2026).
- Raviv, Dvir; Zissu, Boaz (2024). "An Update on the Geographical Distribution of the Coins Minted by the Bar Kokhba". Israel Numismatic Research. 19: 71–88.
- Safrai, Shmuel (1976). "The Era of the Mishnah and Talmud (70–640)". In Ben-Sasson, H.H. (ed.). A History of the Jewish People. Harvard University Press. pp. 307–382. ISBN 0-674-39730-4.
- Shivtiel, Yinon (2022). "Hiding Complexes in Galilee: Aspects and Significance". Cities, Monuments and Objects in the Roman and Byzantine Levant: Studies in Honour of Gabi Mazor. Archaeopress. pp. 274–286. doi:10.2307/jj.14638136.26. JSTOR jj.14638136.26.
- Sion, Ofer; Ganor, Amir; Klein, Eitan; Amichay, Oriya; Hamer, Hagay; Cohen, Chaim (2023). "The Renewed Excavations in the Cave of Horror". In Sion, Ofer; Uziel, Joe; Ganor, Amir; Klein, Eitan (eds.). New Studies in the Archaeology of the Judean Desert: Collected Papers. Jerusalem: Israel Antiquities Authority. pp. 89–106. doi:10.2307/jj.10329820.7.
- Smallwood, E. Mary (1976). The Jews under Roman Rule from Pompey to Diocletian. Brill. doi:10.1163/9789004502048_023. ISBN 978-90-04-50204-8.
- Stiebel, Guy (2003). "The militaria from Herodium". In Bottini, G. C.; Di Segni, Leah; Chrupcała, L. D. (eds.). One Land–Many Cultures: Archaeological Studies in Honour of Stanislao Loffreda O.F.M. (PDF). Collectio maior (Studium Biblicum Franciscanum). Vol. 041. Franciscan Printing Press. pp. 215–244.
- Ussishkin, David (1993). "Archaeological Soundings at Betar, Bar-Kochba's Last Stronghold". Tel Aviv. 20 (1): 66–97. doi:10.1179/tav.1993.1993.1.66. ISSN 0334-4355.
- Zissu, Boaz; Ganor, Amir (2002). "Ḥorvat 'Etri — the Ruins of a Second Temple Period Jewish Village on the Coastal Plain". Qadmoniot: A Journal for the Antiquities of Eretz-Israel and Bible Lands (in Hebrew). 1 (123): 18–27. ISSN 0033-4839. JSTOR 23682420.
- Zissu, Boaz; Klein, Eitan (2011). "A Rock-Cut Burial Cave from the Roman Period at Beit Nattif, Judaean Foothills". Israel Exploration Journal. 61 (2): 196–216. JSTOR 23214247.
- Zissu, Boaz (2023). Sion, Ofer; Uziel, Joe; Ganor, Amir; Klein, Eitan (eds.). "Kings, Hermits and Refugees in the Judean Desert in the Late Second Temple Period and During the Bar Kokhba Revolt". New Studies in the Archaeology of the Judean Desert: Collected Papers. Israel Antiquities Authority: 185–216. doi:10.2307/jj.10329820.11. ISBN 978-965-406-774-4.
