= Khirbet el-Qutt =

Archaeological site in the West Bank

- חורבת אל קוט (Hebrew)
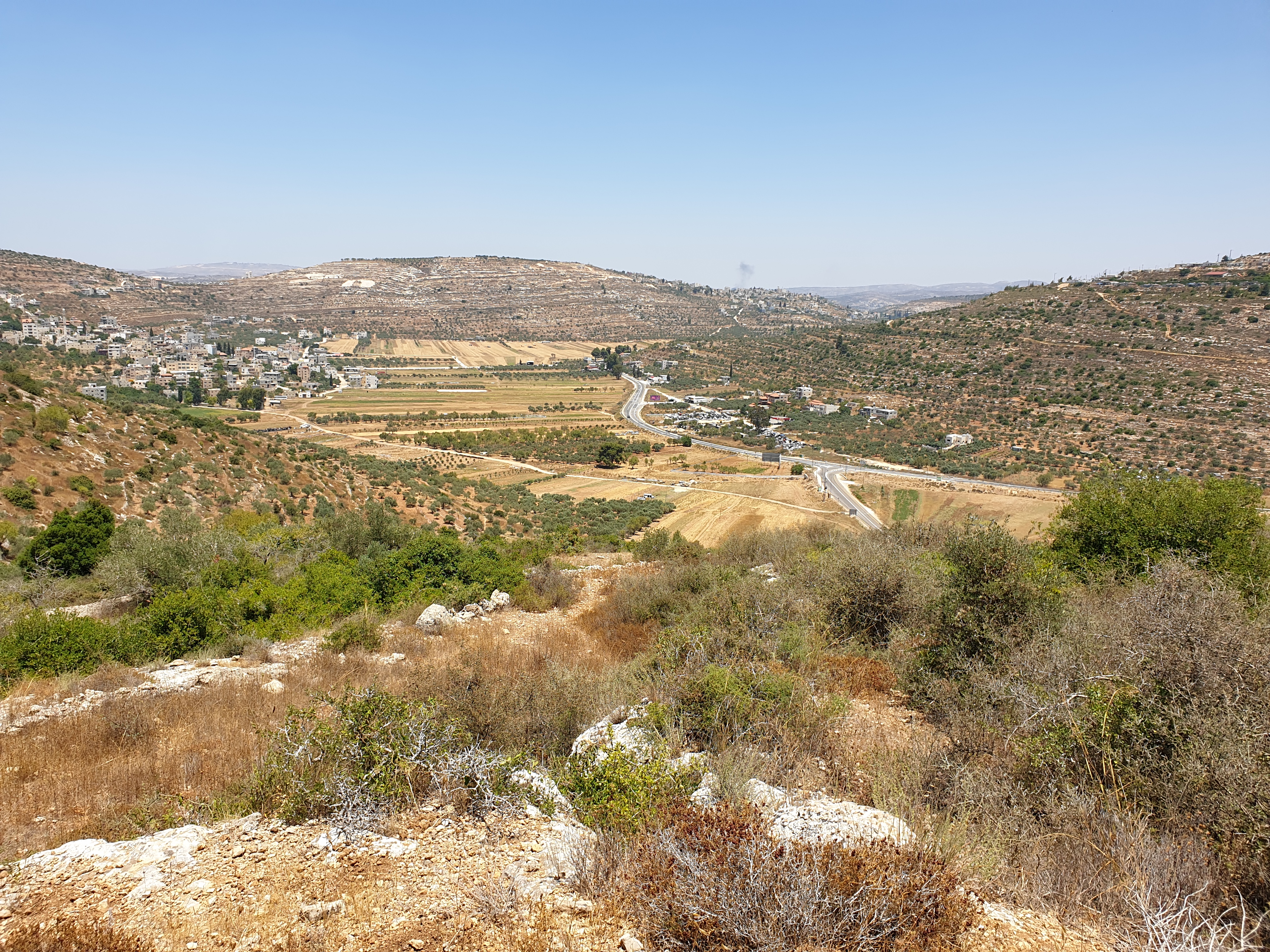

- Location within the West Bank
- 32°06′20″N 35°24′28″E
- Type: Settlement, mikveh, rock-cut tombs
- Periods: Bronze Age, Iron Age, Hasmonean kingdom, Herodian kingdom, province of Judaea, Byzantine, Persian
- Location: West Bank
- Grid position: Israel Ref. 22295/66332

Site notes
- Height: 650 m (2,130 ft)
- Area: 2 ha (4.9 acres)
- Condition: Ruined
- Owner: Public
- Public access: Yes

Khirbet el-Qutt is an archaeological site occupied from the Early Bronze Age through the Byzantine and Early Muslim periods. The site is located on and around a hill between the present-day village of Al-Lubban ash-Sharqiya and Israeli settlement Ma'ale Levona. The discovery of subterranean hiding complexes and mikvahs in the 20th and 21st century indicated that the site had become a Jewish settlement during the Second Temple period, and that its inhabitants were participants in the Bar Kokhba Revolt.

== History ==
Following the Six-Day War in 1967 Israel occupied the West Bank and assumed control of archaeological sites. In the late 1960s, Zecharia Kallai surveyed the ruins at Khirbet el-Qutt.

The earliest evidence of human activity and inhabitation of the Khirbet el-Qutt site is provided by ceramics and structural remains dated to the Early Bronze Age and Iron II in a 1970s archeological survey. Two further studies, published in 1997 and 2001, discovered more artefacts and remnants at or near the site, such as multiple mikvahs, cisterns, and burial sites. These were dated "from the Iron II, Persian, Hellenistic, Roman, Byzantine and Early Muslim periods".

A 2014 survey discovered further evidence of human settlement, such as more buildings, quarries, and agricultural sites. The study also linked a previously discovered mikvah to the Kirbet el-Qutt site. Due to its distance from the main site, previous surveyors had grouped it with a separate settlement, located under 200 metres away. However, Raviv, Har-Even, and Tavger argued that the nearby "presence...of several tombs belonging to the [Khirbet el-Qutt] necropolis" demonstrated a much stronger connection to the further site. They put forth the hypothesis that the paths had been constructed in connection with the burial sites, or perhaps for the settlement's agricultural workers.

The 2014 survey also looked at irregularly crafted subterranean hiding complexes, likely converted from storage caves and used by the Jewish residents during Bar Kokhba Revolt. Unlike other hiding complexes constructed by the Jewish people during this period, the complexes at the Khirbet el-Qutt site lack the typical tunnel system; according to the surveyors, they were unsure as to the exact nature of the caves until the discovery of cooking utensils which were conclusively dated to the time period.

During the earliest surveys, a researcher attempted to connect the site with Lakitia, a village identified in Midrash as the location of a Roman garrison during the revolt. This specific connection is contested and has not been adopted in academia due to lack of archeological evidence. However, the vast majority of pottery and other evidence of human settlement discovered at the site does date to the Roman occupation of the Levant, indicating that the settlement was at its largest around that time.

== Modern era ==
The nearest modern-day villages are the Al-Lubban ash-Sharqiya village and Israeli settlement Ma'ale Levona, which the site is situated between.

== Bibliography ==
- Greenberg, Raphael; Keinan, Adi (2009). Israeli Archaeological Activity in the West Bank 1967–2007: A Sourcebook (PDF). Ostracon. ISBN 978-965-91468-0-2.
- Raviv, Dvir; Har-Even, Binyamin; Tavger, Aharon (2015). "Khirbet el-Qutt -A Fortified Jewish Village in Southern Samaria from the Second Temple Period and the Bar Kokhba Revolt". Judea and Samaria Research Studies. 25 (1): 9*–27*.
