= Avraham Ofek =

Israeli artist (1935–1990)

- אברהם אופק
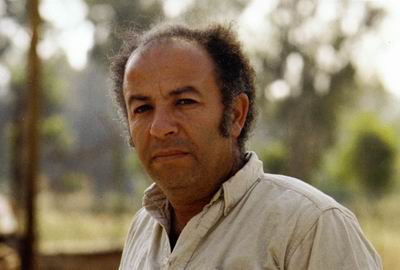
- Avraham Ofek
- Born: 14 August 1935; Burgas, Bulgaria
- Died: 13 January 1990 (aged 54); Jerusalem, Israel
- Known for: Painting, sculpture, and interdisciplinary artworks
- Movement: Leviathan Group

Avraham Ofek (Hebrew: אברהם אופק; 14 August 1935 – 13 January 1990) was a multidisciplinary Israeli artist.

== Biography ==
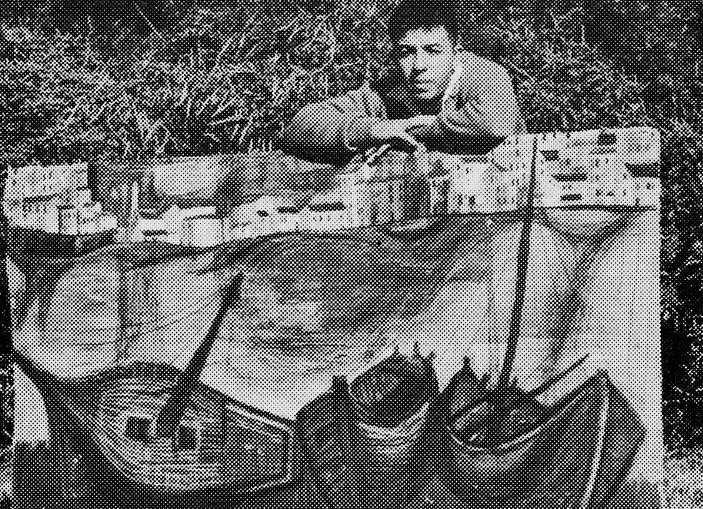
Avraham Ofek at Kibbutz Ein Hamifratz, 1952

Avraham Ofek was born in Burgas, Bulgaria. Within two years of the establishment of the State of Israel in 1948, 45000 of Bulgaria’s 50000 Jews left voluntarily for Israel, including fourteen-year-old Avraham Ofek. Ofek’s birth parents died prior to this, and he emigrated with an adoptive family. Ofek's adoptive status remained unknown to him until his twenties. They settled in Kibbutz Ein HaMifratz. Informally, Ofek studied painting under his neighbour, Aryeh Rothman.

In 1952, Ofek's adoptive father died. Two years later, Ofek enlisted in the Nahal Brigade of the Israel Defense Forces.

In 1958, he went to Italy to continue his studies and to participate in the mural on the wall of the Accademia di Belle Arti in Florence. Under the spell of the art of mural painting, which Ofek considered the primary medium of his work, he painted several of his best-known works, such as the mural on the wall of Beit Haam in Kfar Uria (1970), the mural in the Central Post Office in Jerusalem (1972) and the mural 'Israel, a Shattered Dream', at Haifa University (1986–1987).

Upon returning to Israel in 1962, Efrat, his eldest daughter, was born in Kibbutz Ein Hamifratz. The family shortly moved to Jerusalem, and in 1966 began teaching at the Bezalel Academy.

In 1963, Ofek served as one of the coffin-bearers at the funeral of Yitzhak Ben-Zvi, the second president of Israel.

In 1977, Ofek began studying at Yeshiva Mercaz HaRav.

== Artistic style ==
Avraham Ofek's early works were traditional landscapes, in a distinctly hybrid style that is particular to Middle Eastern, Jewish art. Later in his career, landscapes became undefined and receded into the background. Towards the end of Ofek's life, the landscape of Jerusalem became an important motif, reflecting loss and despair. Many of Ofek's landscapes convey a sense of alienation and solitude, as well as nostalgia for the city of his birth, Sofia.

In 1957 his first solo exhibition was held at the Acre Museum. Following the exhibition, Ofek was invited to exhibit in the prestigious exhibition hall of the Bezalel Academy of Art and Design. Most of his works in these years and until the early 1960s are made of gouache and tempera on paper. Iconographically, the paintings are characterised by the use of concrete images such as cows, agricultural machinery and landscapes of the country, painted using dark coloration that differs from earlier attempts to reflect the "light of the Land of Israel". Ofek's works included images of Arab workers and slums, which he painted during his visits to Haifa, Acre and Jaffa.

Throughout his life, Ofek's horizon was far from the mainstream of Israeli art; when Israel's art turned to abstraction, scrawl, collage, and concept, he insisted on figurative painting; when Israel's art examined the boundaries of medium, he painted with extensive symbolism; when Israel's art wanted to be autonomous, Ofek wanted to be social; when Israel's art was universal, Avraham Ofek was Jewish.

— Setter, Shaul. 'Exhibition Review', in Haaretz (haaretz.co.il, 2018), https://www.haaretz.co.il/gallery/art/artreview/.premium-1.6430537.

During the late 1960s and throughout the 1970s he was an active member of the Leviathan Group, with the artists Shmuel Ackerman and Mikhail Grobman. The group, which was founded in 1976, combined symbolism, metaphysics, Judaism, and conceptual and environmental art. Within the framework of this group, Ofek created performances and symbolic activities into which Jewish traditional symbolism was integrated.

From the 1980s onward, Ofek returned to more traditional painting, which continued to feature Jewish themes, Israeli landscapes, and views of his city, Jerusalem.

In 1989, the Jerusalem Print Workshop issued a collection of reproductions of his prints edited by Uri Katz, with text in Hebrew and English.

== Education ==
- -1958: Under the tutelage of Aryeh Rothman
- 1958–1960: Academy of Fine Arts, Florence
- 1961: Study Tour to Seville and Madrid, Spain, and London
- 1969: Study Tour to Europe and the U.S.A.

== Teaching ==
- 1965–1975: Bezalel Academy, Jerusalem
- 1975: Head of the Television Broadcasting Art Department, Jerusalem
- 1978–1981: Art Department, Haifa University
- 1984–1990: Professor, Art Department, Haifa University

== Prizes ==
- 1959: America-Israel Cultural Foundation
- 1969: Jerusalem Prize for painting and Sculpture
- 1990: Ish-Shalom Prize for Life's Work in Art

== Outdoor and Public Art ==
- 1970, mural, Beit Haam, Kfar Uria
- 1972, mural, Central Post Office, Jerusalem
- 1973, mural, Agron School, Jerusalem
- 1974, 'Mountains About Jerusalem', mural, Stone School, Jerusalem
- 1976, 'Return to Zion', mural, Tel Aviv University Library, Tel Aviv
- 1982, 'Hailek Ben Shachar', stone sculpture, Gan Harakevet, Arlozorof Street, Tel Aviv-Yafo
- 1986, 'Homage to Asher', 1966 stone sculpture, Tefen Open University, Tefen
- 1986–1987, 'Israel, A Shattered Dream', mural, Haifa University, Haifa
- 1987, stone sculpture, Tel Aviv Museum of Art, Tel Aviv, Israel
- 2000, [relocation] Binding of Isaac (1986), stone sculpture, Gan Daniel, Safra Square, Jerusalem

== Selected exhibitions ==
- Exhibition of gouache paintings and drawings by Avraham Ofek, The Municipal Museum, Acre, 1957
- Avraham Ofek – Solo exhibition, Dugith Art Gallery, Tel Aviv, 1964
- Avraham Ofek: Paintings, The Bezalel National Museum, Jerusalem, 21 December 1957 – 15 January 1958
- Retrospective – Works 1956–1986, Museum of Art, Ein Harod, 3 May 1986 – 3 June 1986
- Prints and Miniature Sculpture by Avraham Ofek – On the Occasion of the First Anniversary of his Death, Yad Labanim Museum, Petach-Tikva, 9 February 1991 – 16 March 1991
- Night's Final Watch, Avraham Ofek: The Last Gouache Work, University of Haifa, Faculty of Humanities, The Art Gallery, Haifa, 12 March 1991 – 12 April 1991
- Landscape of Longing: Avraham Ofek's Early and Late Works, Israel Museum, Jerusalem, 15 March 2007 – 23 June 2007
- Avraham Ofek: Body, Work, Joseph and Rebecca Meyerhoff Pavilion, Main Building, Tel Aviv Museum of Art, Tel Aviv, 31 May 2018 – 20 October 2018

== Gallery ==
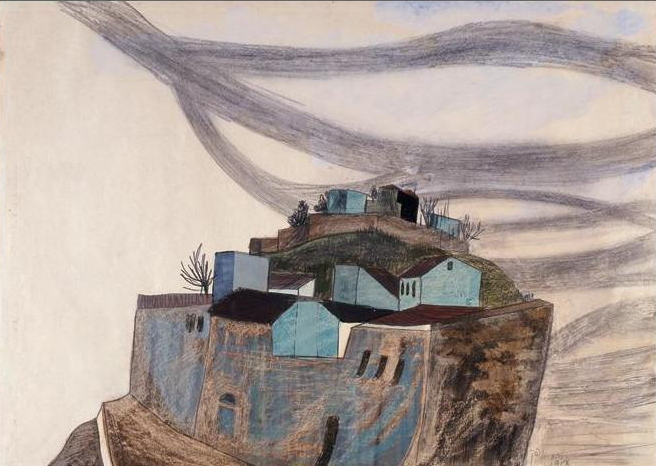
Untitled, 1958
Israel Museum Collection

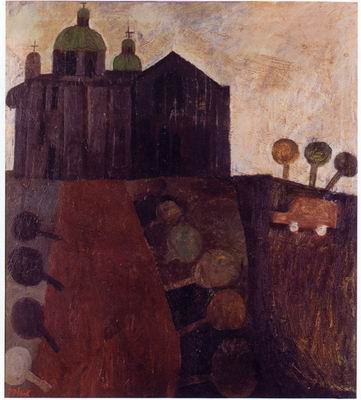
Jerusalem, the Russian Compound, 1963
Israel Museum Collection
B63.12.3440

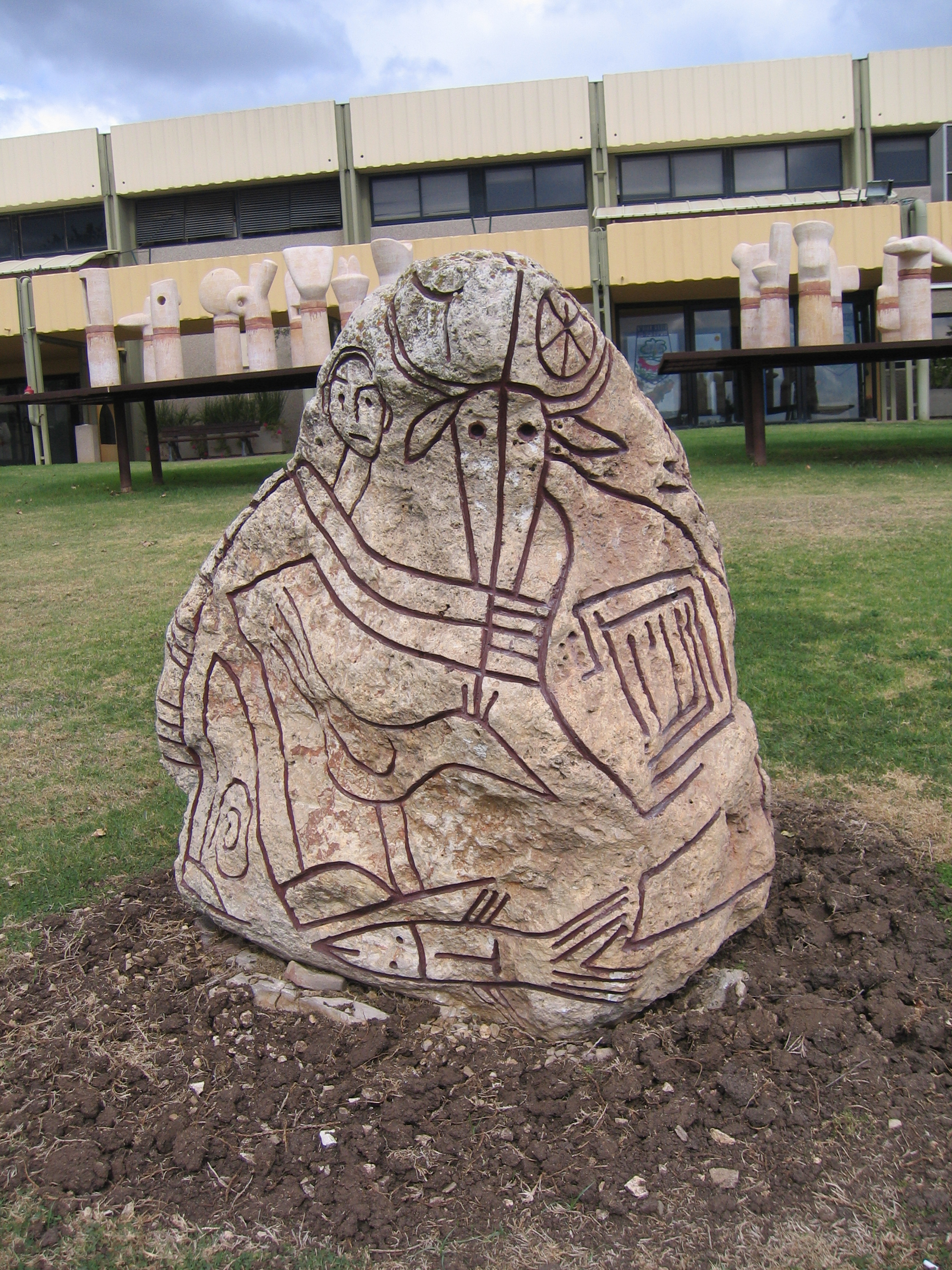
Homage to Asher, 1966
stone
Tefen Open Museum

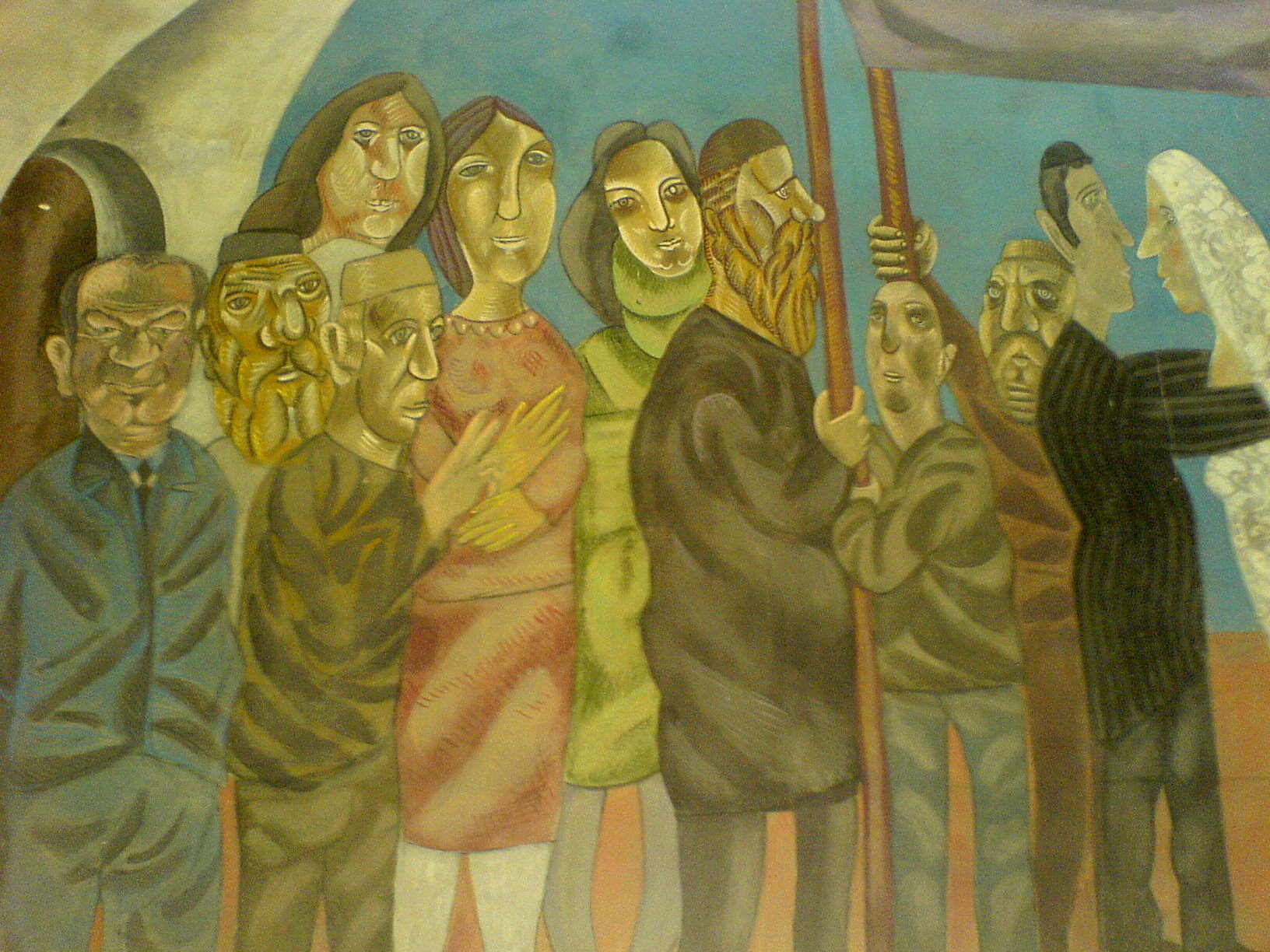
Part of a mural, 1970
Kfar Uria

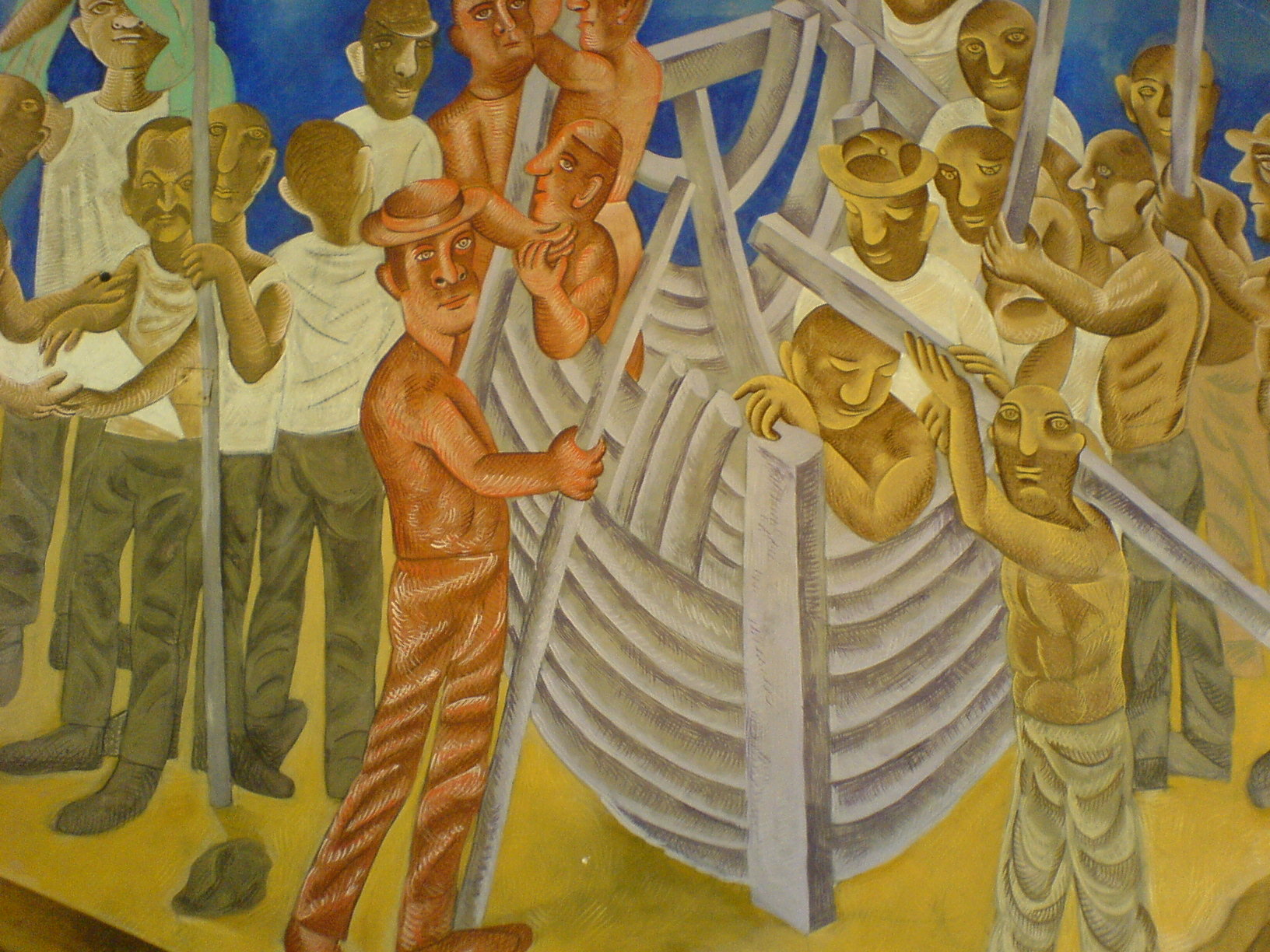
Part of a mural, 1970
Kfar Uria

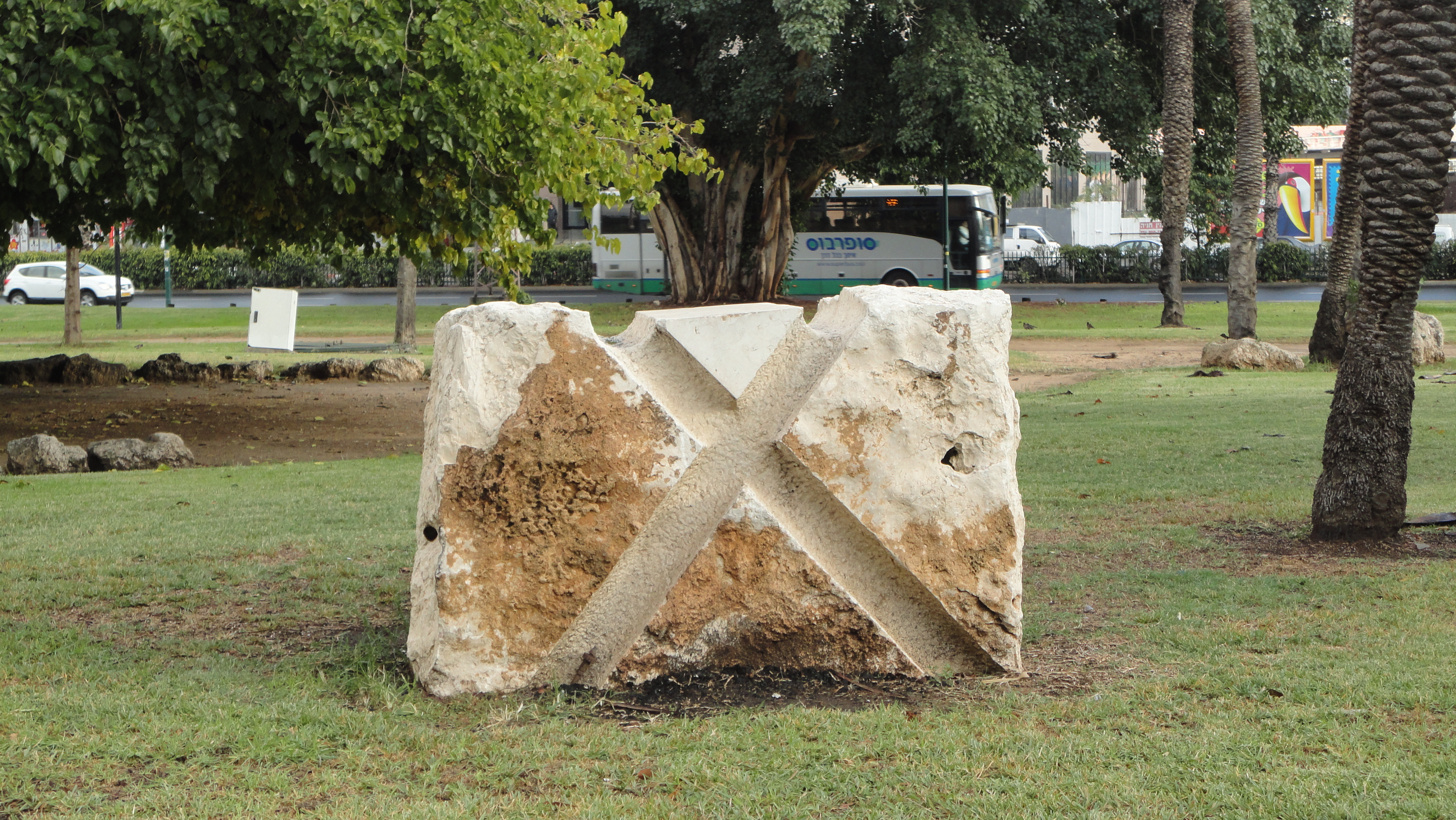
Hailek Ben Shachar, 1982
stone
Gan HaRakevet (Railway Garden), Arlozoroff Street, Tel Aviv-Yafo

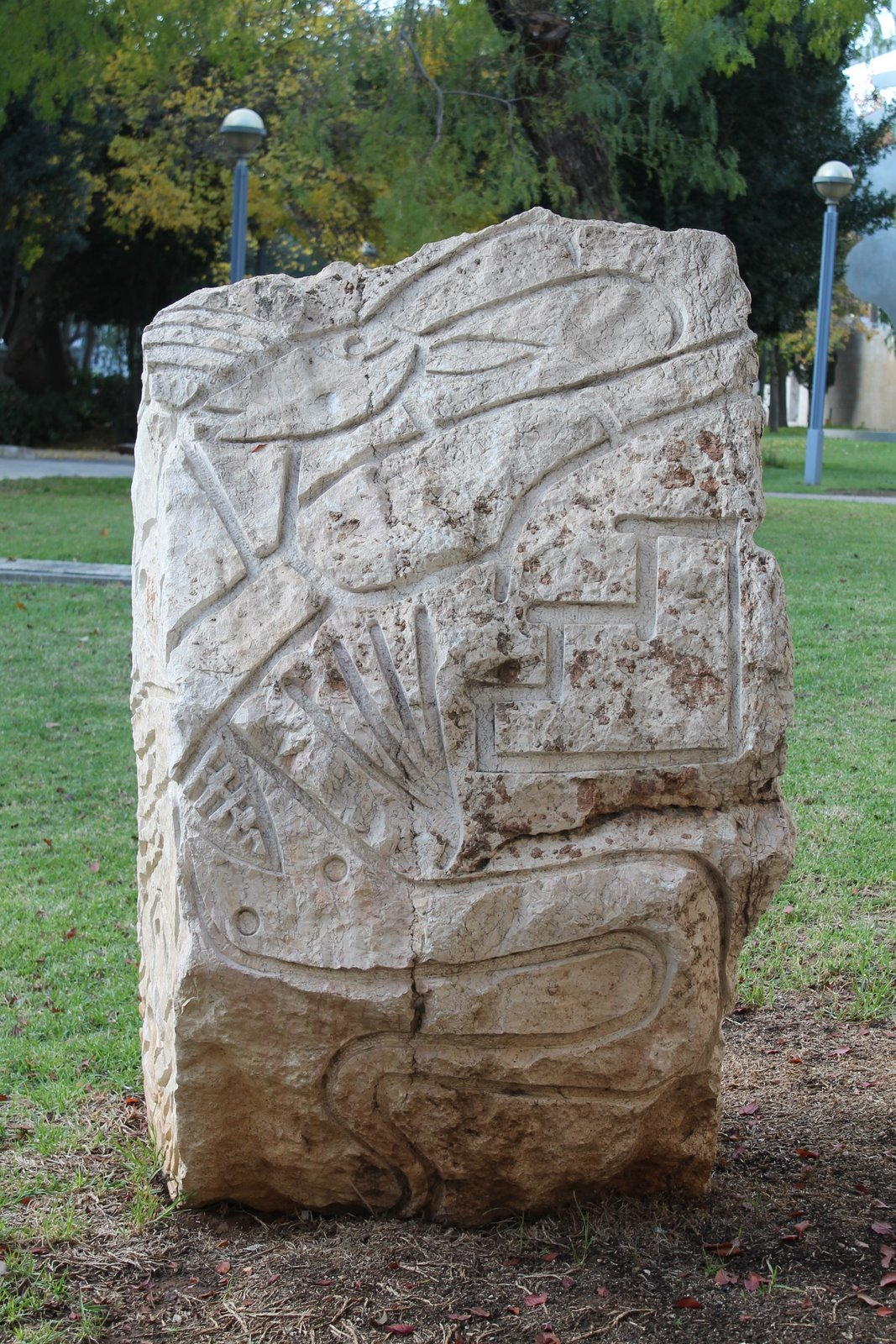
Binding of Isaac, 1986
stone
Safra Square, Jerusalem

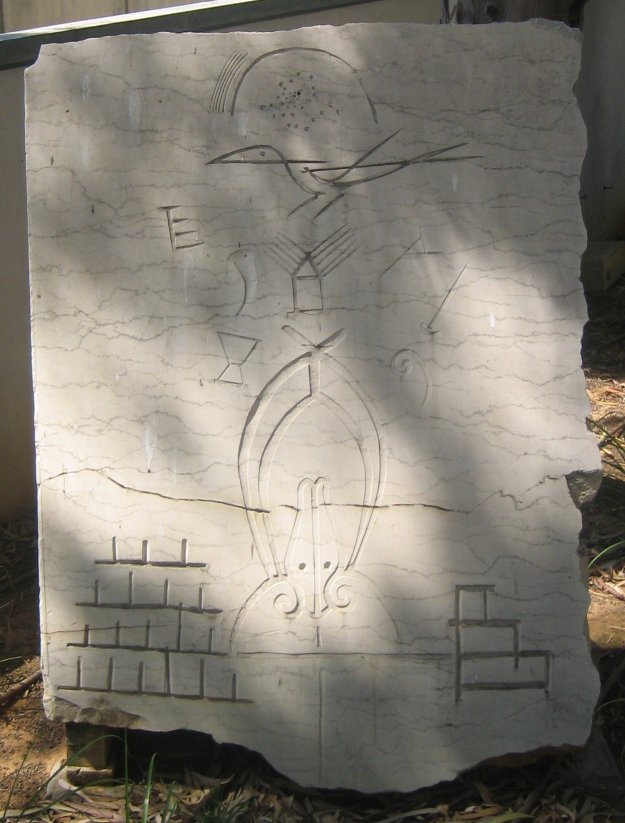
Stone, 1987
sandblasting on Jerusalem stone
Tel Aviv Museum of Art, Tel Aviv, Israel

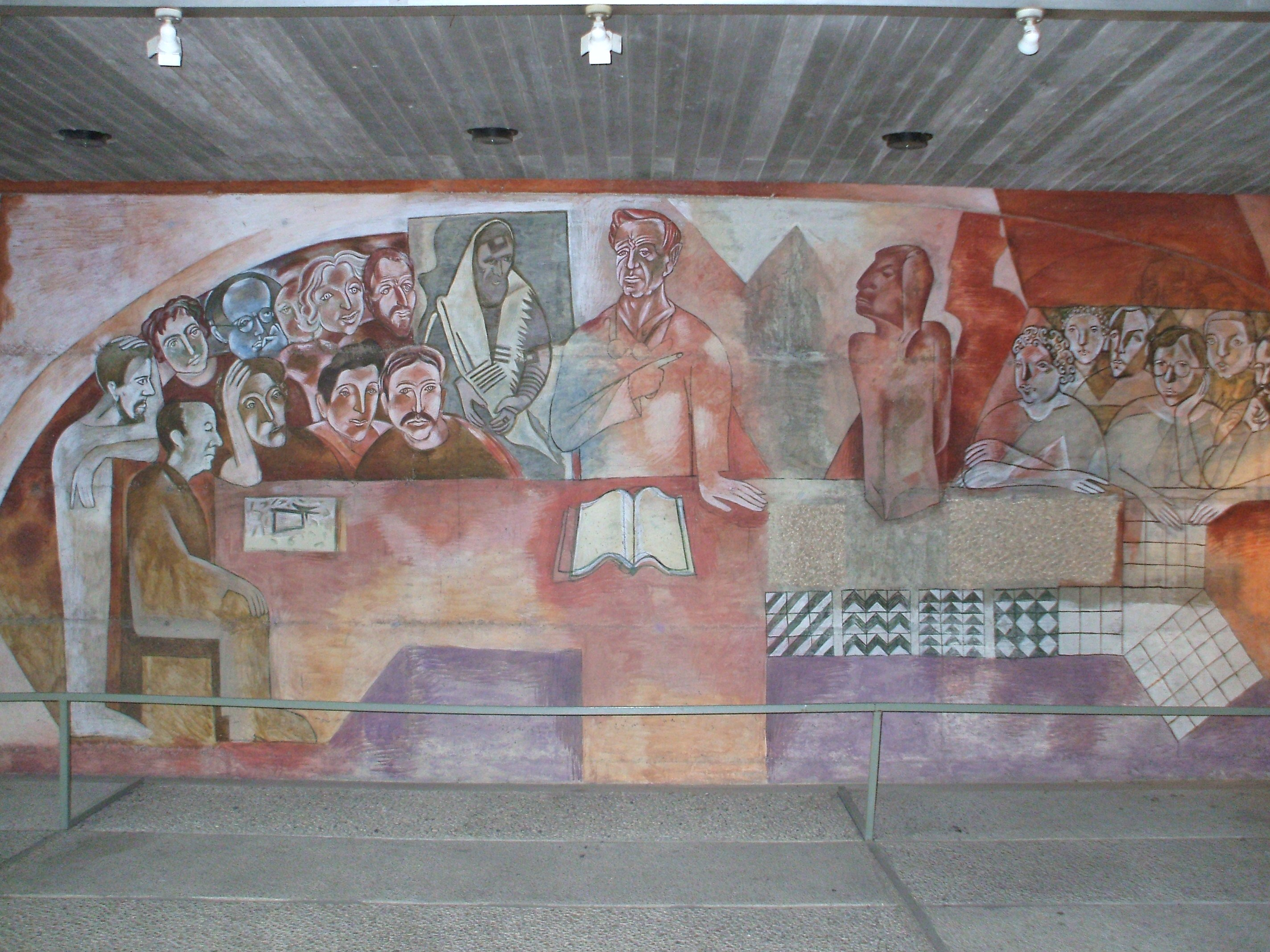
Part of a mural, 1988
University of Haifa

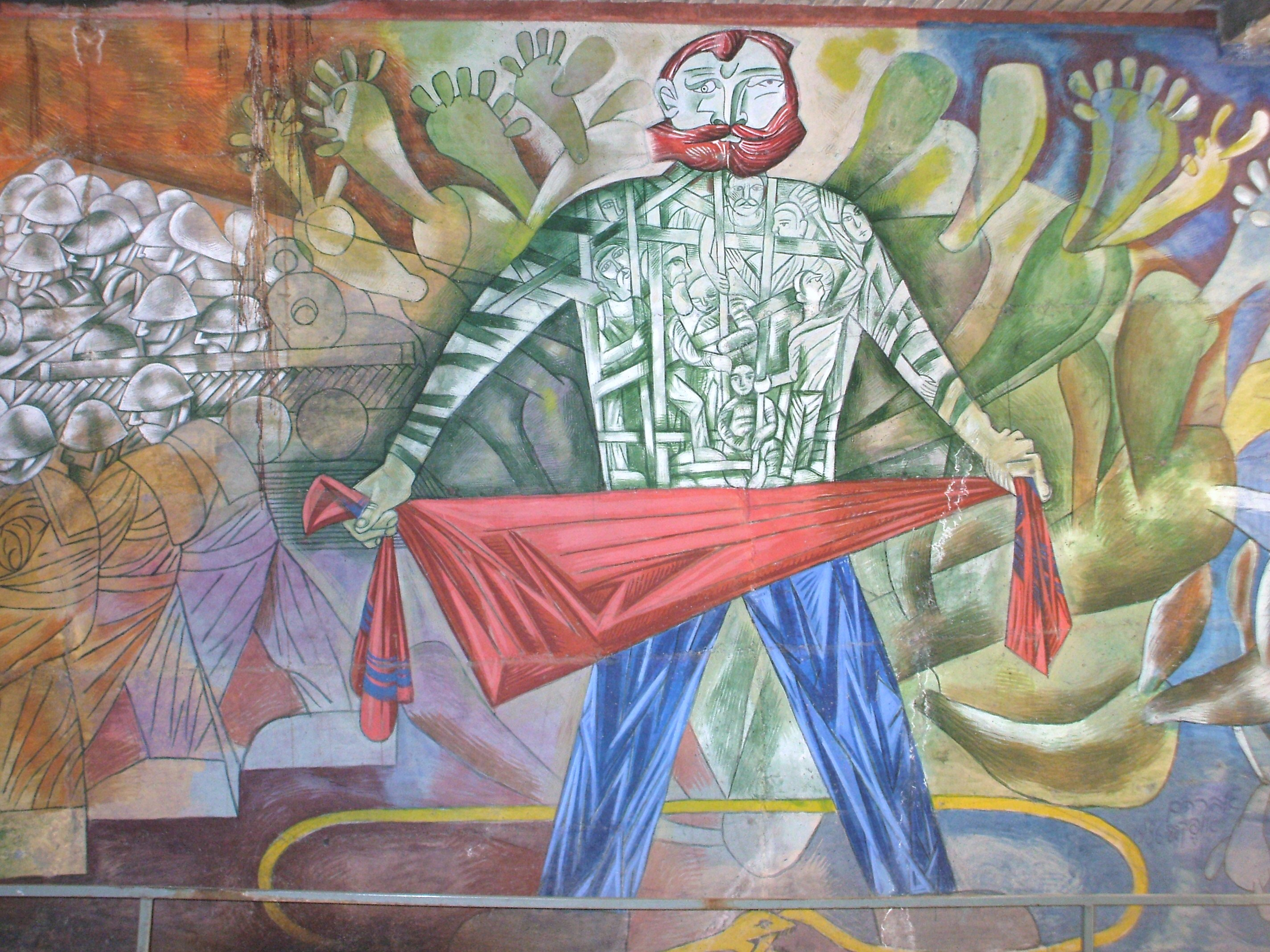
Part of a mural, 1988
University of Haifa
