= Khirbat Ism Allah =

Khirbat Ism Allah خربة إسم الله
- Village
- Etymology: Kh. Ism Allah, the ruin of the name of God
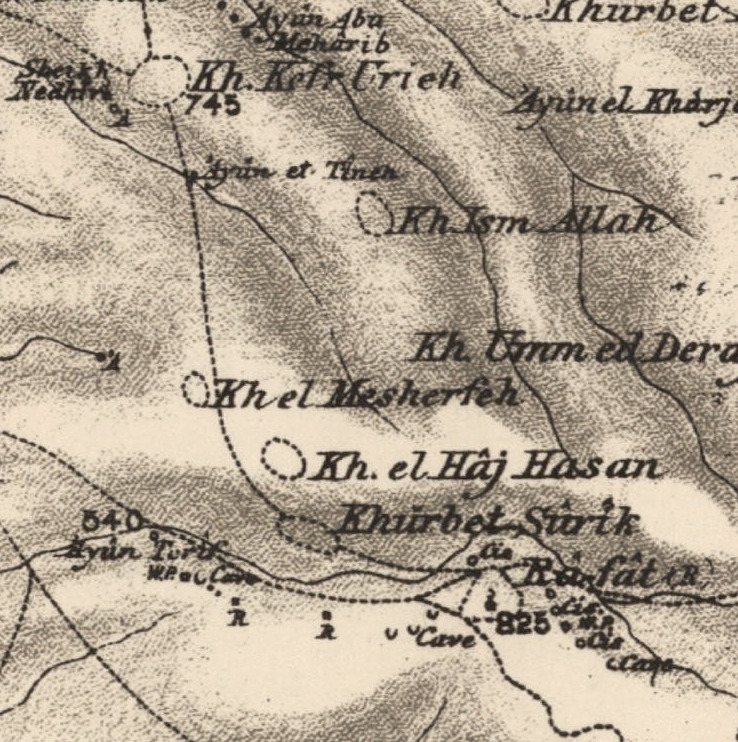
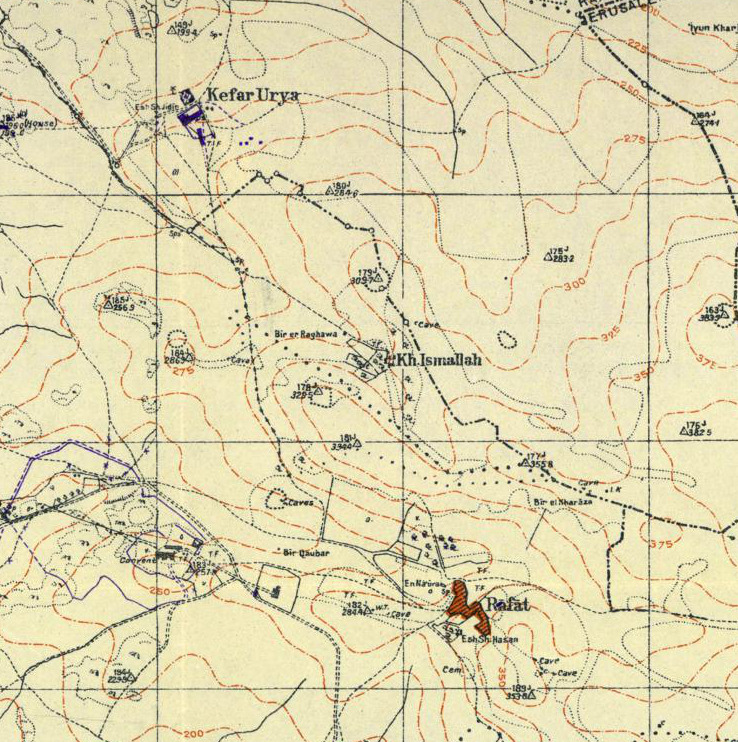
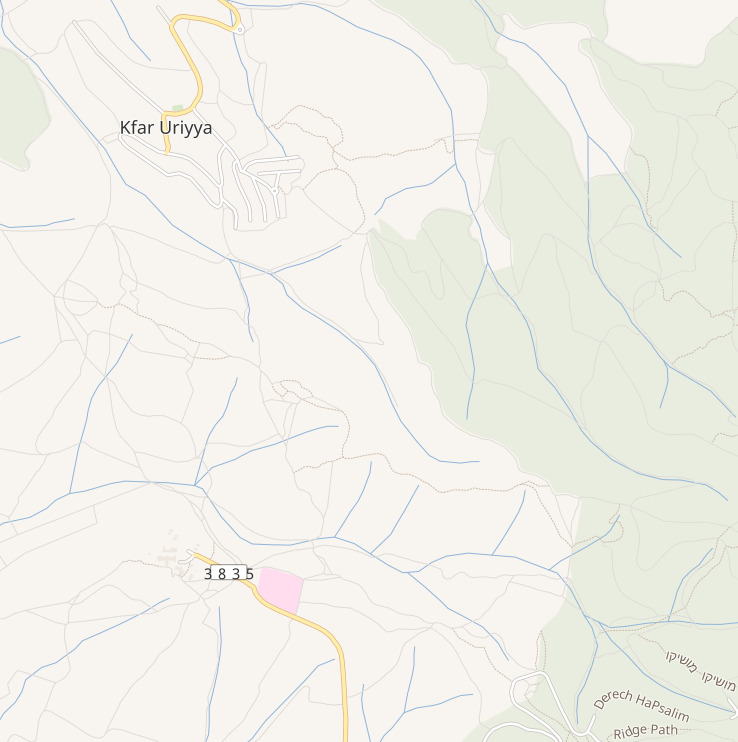
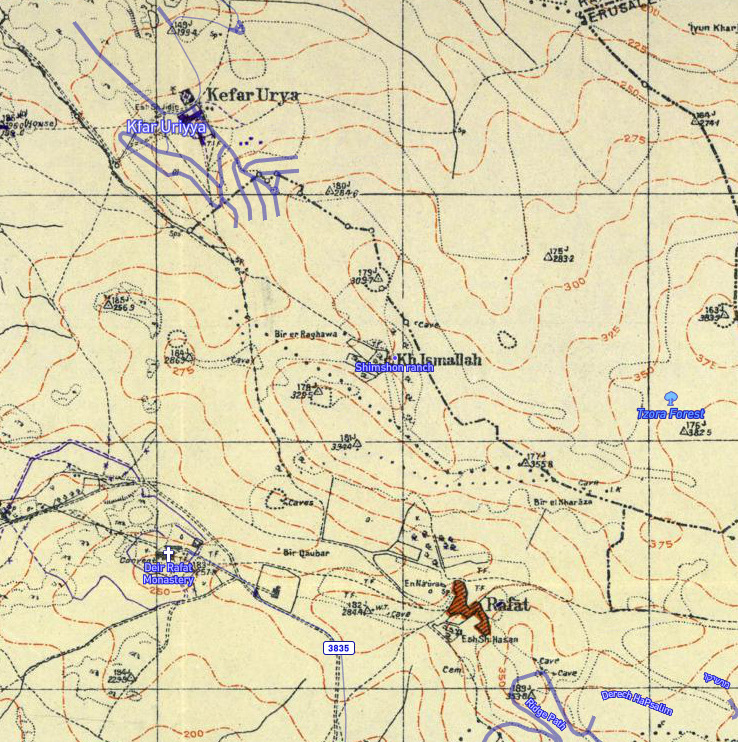
- 1870s map 1940s map modern map 1940s with modern overlay map A series of historical maps of the area around Khirbat Ism Allah (click the buttons)

- Location within Mandatory Palestine
- Coordinates: 31°46′59″N 34°57′19″E
- Palestine grid: 145/132
- Geopolitical entity: Mandatory Palestine
- Subdistrict: Jerusalem
- Date of depopulation: July 17, 1948

Area
  - Total: 568 dunams (56.8 ha; 140 acres)

Population (1945)
  - Total: 20

Khirbat Ism Allah was a Palestinian Arab hamlet in the Jerusalem Subdistrict, located 26 km west of Jerusalem. It was depopulated during the 1948 Arab–Israeli War on July 17, 1948, by the Harel Brigade of Operation Dani. Khirbat Ism Allah was mostly destroyed with the exception of several deserted houses.

== History ==
In 1883, the PEF's Survey of Western Palestine only noted “foundations" here.

=== British Mandate era ===
According to the 1931 census of Palestine, conducted in 1931 by the British Mandate authorities, Khirbat Ism Allah had a population of 18 inhabitants, in 4 houses.

In 1944 Zionist established Kfar Uria about 1,5 km NW of the village site, but not on village land.

In the 1945 statistics, Khirbat Ism Allah had a population of 20 Muslims, with a total of 568 dunums of land. Of this, 3 dunams were for irrigable land or plantations, 485 for cereals, while 80 dunams were classified as non-cultivable land.

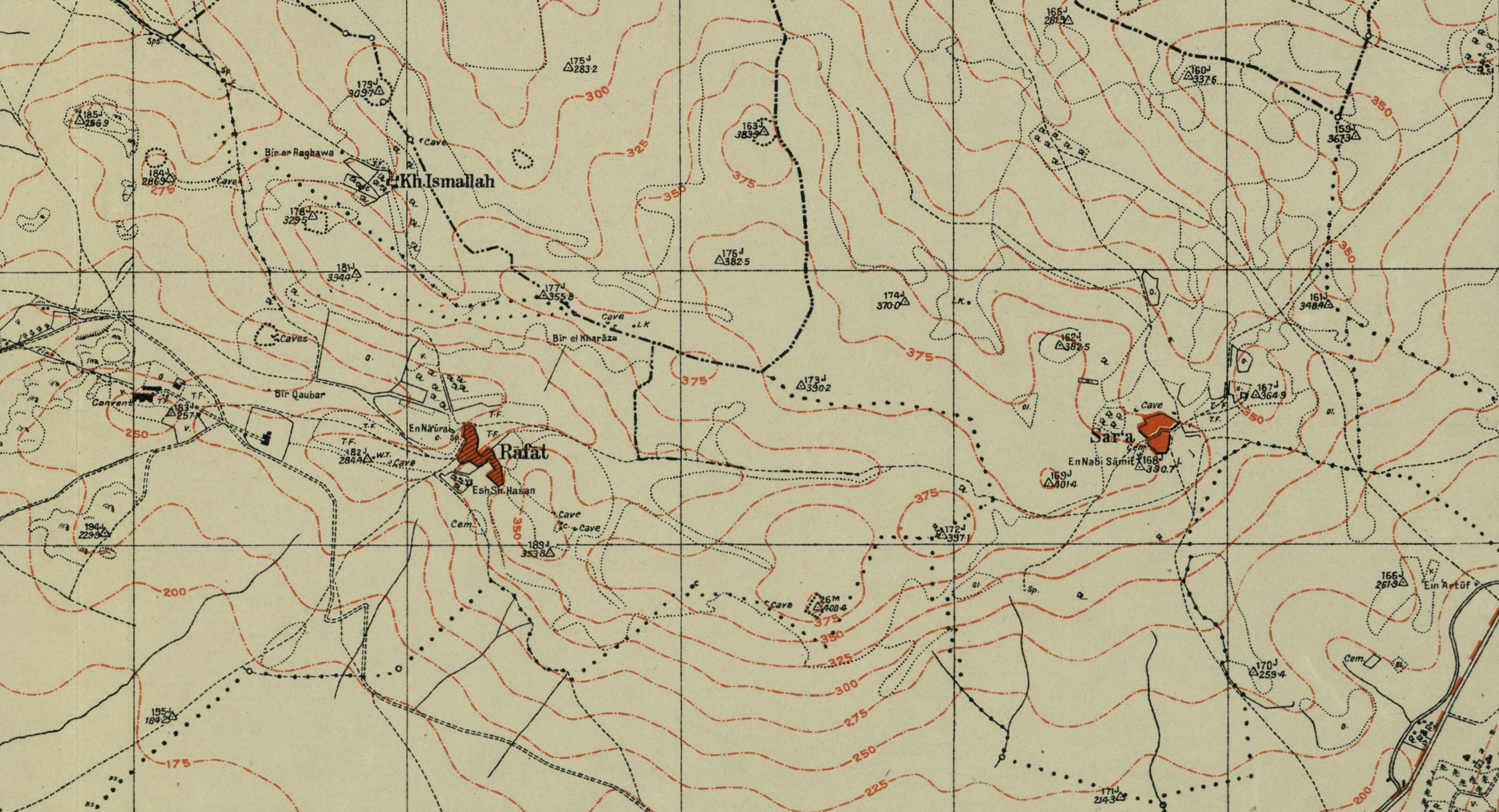
Khirbat Ism Allah 1942 1:20,000

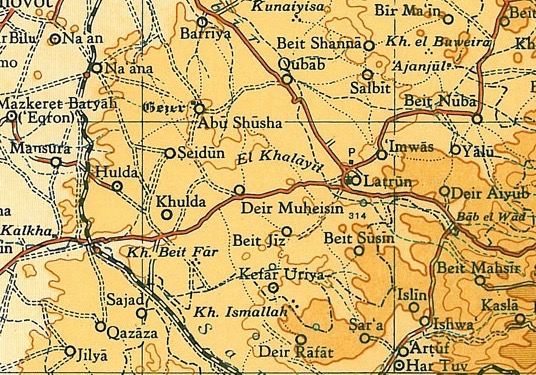
Khirbat Ism Allah 1945 1:250,000

=== 1948, aftermath ===
In 1992, the site was described: "The caves in the northern part of the site still show evidence of their former use as dwellings; the remains of arched entrances are present. In the southern part of the site, a few ruined houses are surrounded by low stone walls. This area has been recently repopulated by a Jewish shepherd family that renovated and occupied one of the houses. The walled in area is used as a goat barn, and the entire area has become a grazing site for the family's flock. The family uses the village spring to the west."

== Bibliography ==
- Conder, C.R.; Kitchener, H. H. (1883). The Survey of Western Palestine: Memoirs of the Topography, Orography, Hydrography, and Archaeology. Vol. 3. London: Committee of the Palestine Exploration Fund.
- Department of Statistics (1945). Village Statistics, April, 1945. Government of Palestine.
- Hadawi, S. (1970). Village Statistics of 1945: A Classification of Land and Area ownership in Palestine. Palestine Liberation Organization Research Center. Archived from the original on 2018-12-08.
- Khalidi, W. (1992). All That Remains: The Palestinian Villages Occupied and Depopulated by Israel in 1948. Washington D.C.: Institute for Palestine Studies. ISBN 0-88728-224-5.
- Mills, E., ed. (1932). Census of Palestine 1931. Population of Villages, Towns and Administrative Areas. Jerusalem: Government of Palestine.
- Morris, B. (2004). The Birth of the Palestinian Refugee Problem Revisited. Cambridge University Press. ISBN 978-0-521-00967-6.
- Palmer, E. H. (1881). The Survey of Western Palestine: Arabic and English Name Lists Collected During the Survey by Lieutenants Conder and Kitchener, R. E. Transliterated and Explained by E.H. Palmer. Committee of the Palestine Exploration Fund.
