= Khirbat Al-Lawz =

Khirbat Al-Lawz خربة اللوز
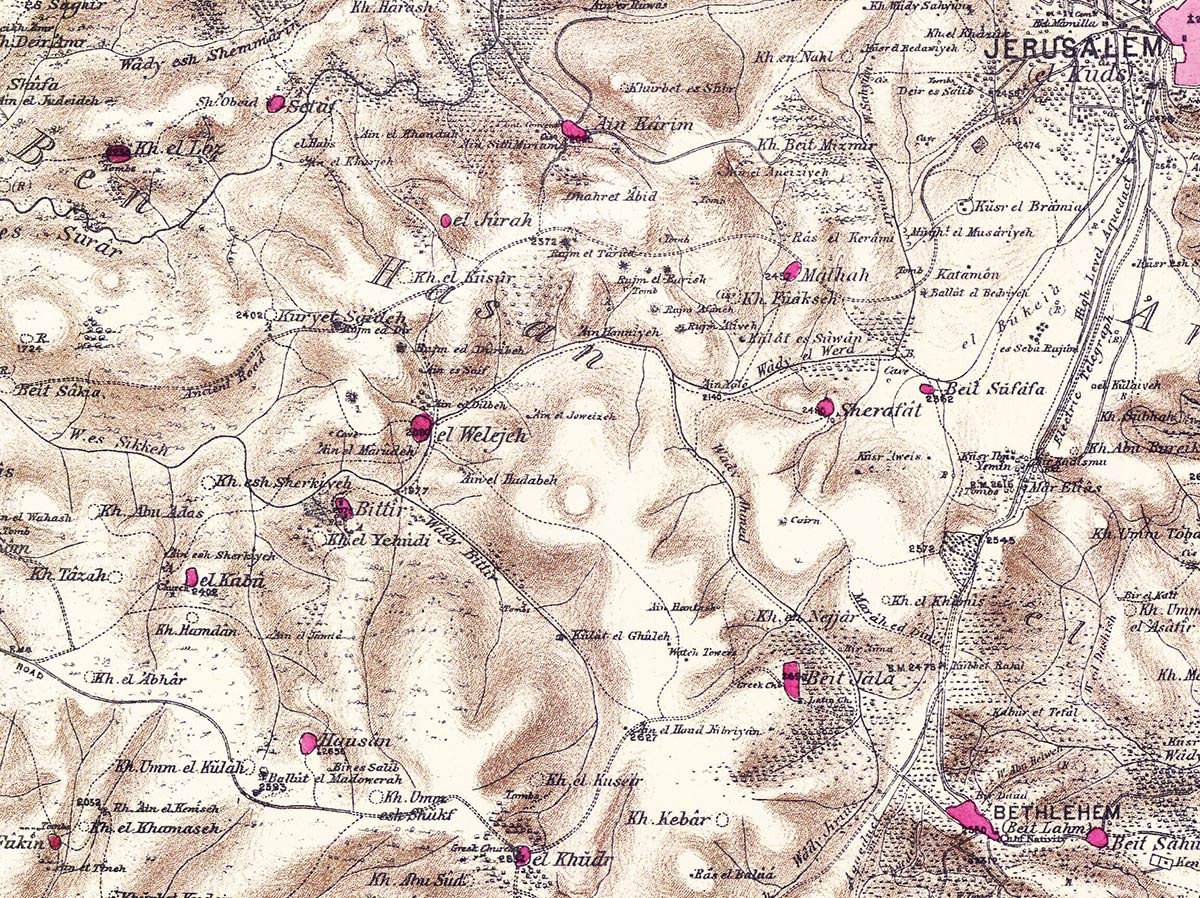
- Map of Khirbat Al-Lawz-area, 1870s
- Etymology: the ruin of the almond
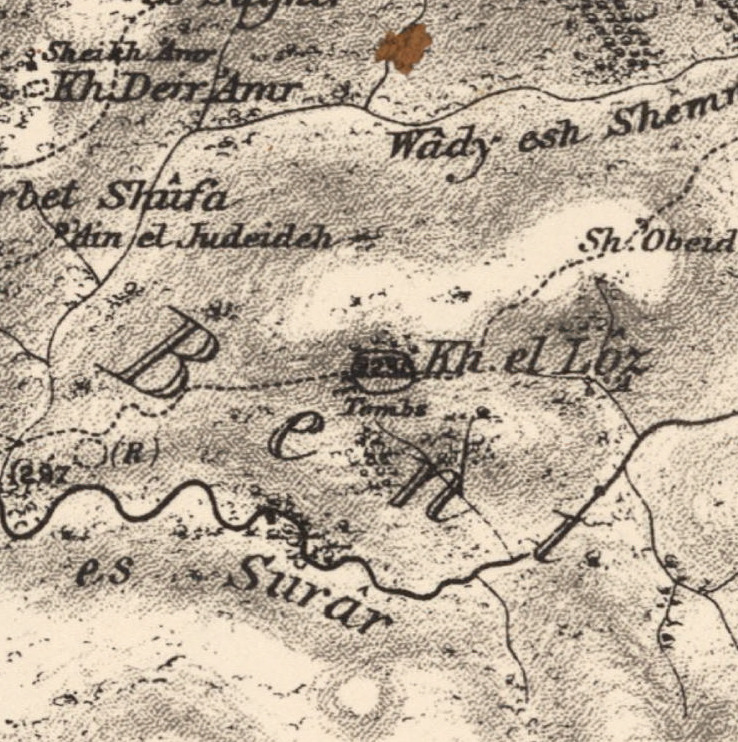
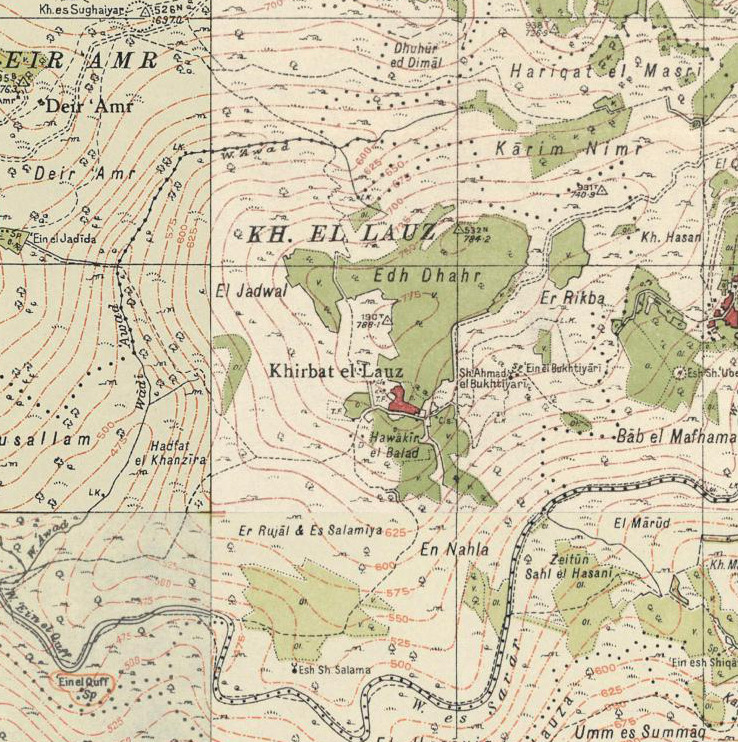
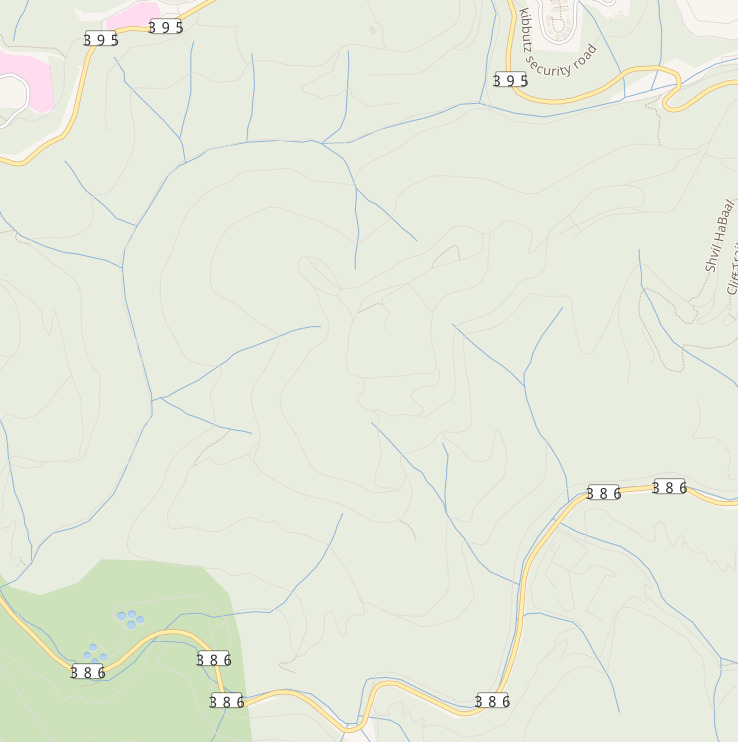
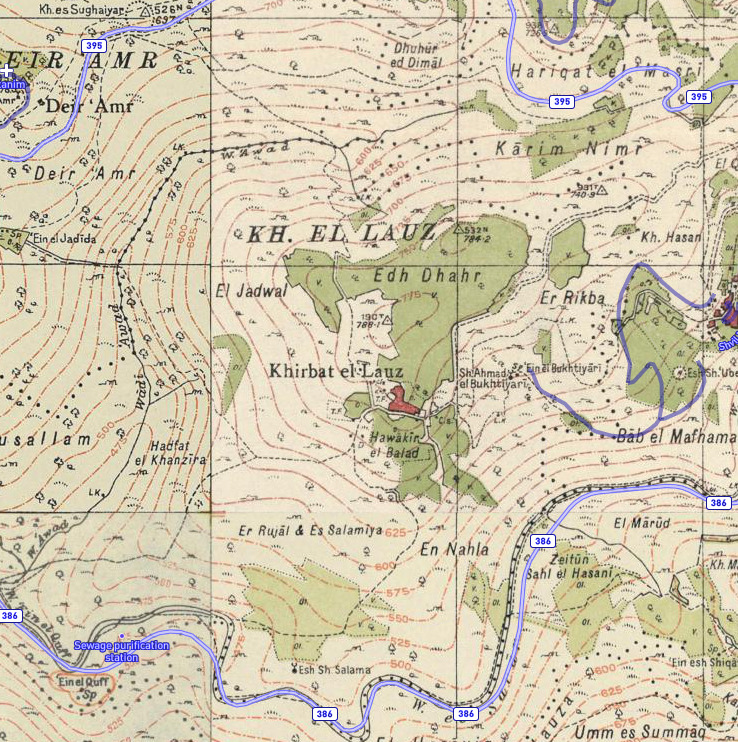
- 1870s map 1940s map modern map 1940s with modern overlay map A series of historical maps of the area around Khirbat Al-Lawz (click the buttons)

- Location within Mandatory Palestine
- Coordinates: 31°46′04″N 35°06′41″E
- Palestine grid: 160/130
- Geopolitical entity: Mandatory Palestine
- Subdistrict: Jerusalem
- Date of depopulation: July 13, 1948

Area
  - Total: 4,502 dunams (4.502 km^{2}; 1.738 sq mi)

Population (1945)
  - Total: 450

Khirbat Al-Lawz (Arabic: خربة اللّوز), pronounced Khirbet al-Loz, was a Palestinian Arab village in the Jerusalem Subdistrict. It was depopulated during the 1948 Arab-Israeli War on July 13, 1948, by the Har'el Brigade of Operation Dani. It was located 11 km west of Jerusalem, situated north of Wadi al-Sarar.

== History ==
=== Ottoman era ===
In 1838, Khirbet el-Lauz was noted as a Muslim village, part of Beni Hasan area, located west of Jerusalem.

In 1863, Victor Guérin found it to be a hamlet of eighty inhabitants, most of them shepherds.

Socin found from an official Ottoman village list from about 1870 that chirbet el-loz had a population of 83, with a total of 38 houses, though the population count included men, only. Hartmann found that chirbet el-loz had 30 houses.

In 1883, the PEF's Survey of Western Palestine described Khurbet el Loz as "a village of moderate size on the slope of a high ridge near the summit. It has a sort of terrace below it, and stands some 800 feet (240 meters) above the southern valley. There are rock-cut tombs at the place."

=== British Mandate era ===
In the 1922 census of Palestine conducted by the British Mandate authorities, Kherbet al-Ley had a population of 234 Muslims, increasing in the 1931 census to 315 Muslims, in 67 houses.

In the 1945 statistics, the village had a population of 450 Muslims, while the total land area was 4,502 dunams, according to an official land and population survey. Of this, 728 were used for plantations and irrigable land, 693 for cereals, while 13 dunams were classified as built-up areas.

Khirbat al-Lawz had a shrine dedicated to a local sage known as al-Shaykh Salama.

=== 1948 and after ===
During the 1948 Arab-Israeli war, the village held out against Jewish attack until mid-1948, when the inhabitants left after observing the fall of nearby Suba. In May 1950, the village site was settled by a group of Yemenite Jews, but they moved to Even Sapir in the following year.

In 1992 the village site was described: "Grass and thorns grow among the stone rubble and terraces all across the site, as well as almond, fig, and carob trees. A thick forest of cypress and fir trees has been planted around the site. South of it, in the forest, is a well surrounded by several almond and fig trees. The forest is dedicated to the memory of Moshe Dayan, the Israeli general."

== Gallery ==
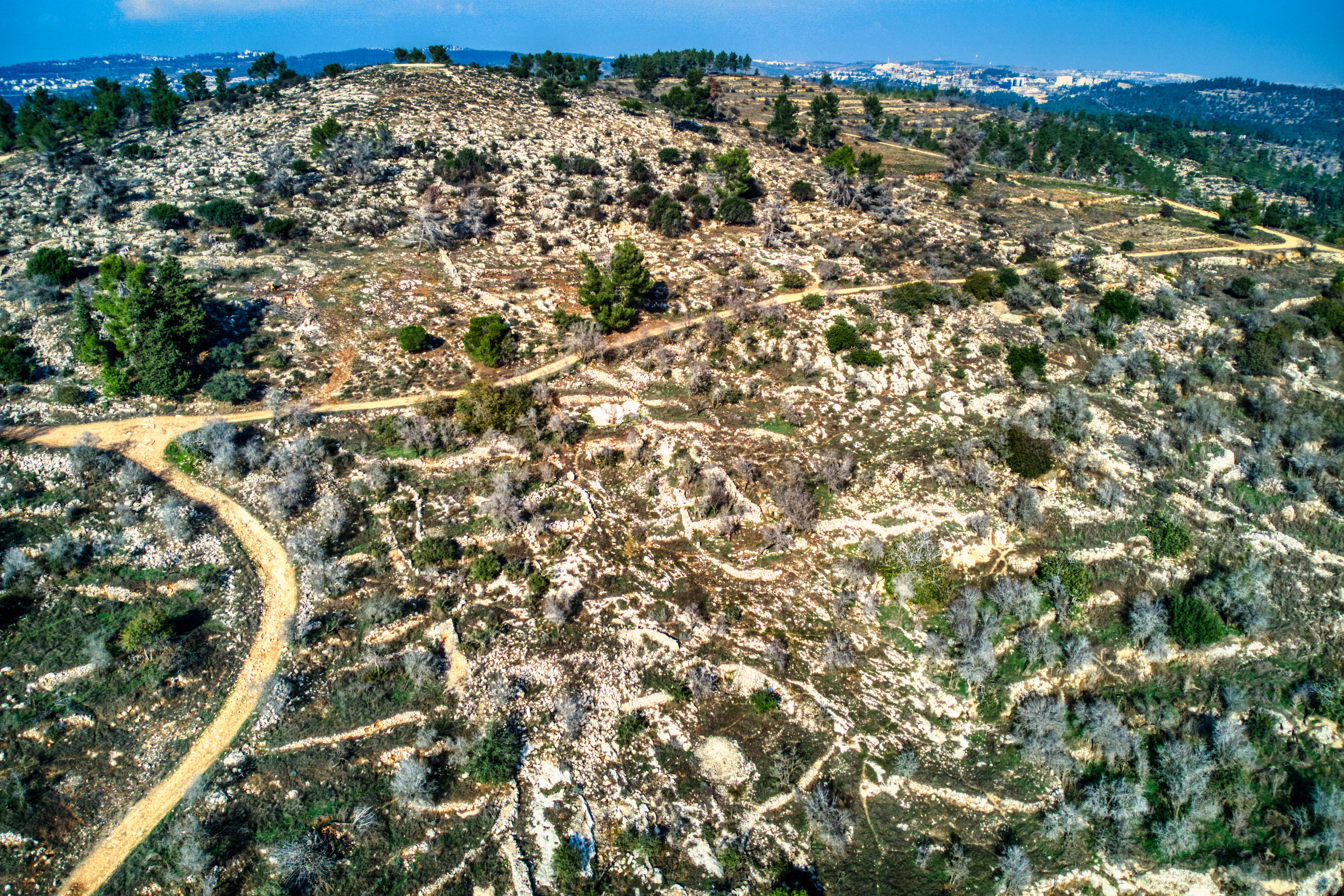
Mount Eitan and its slope with the remains of the village

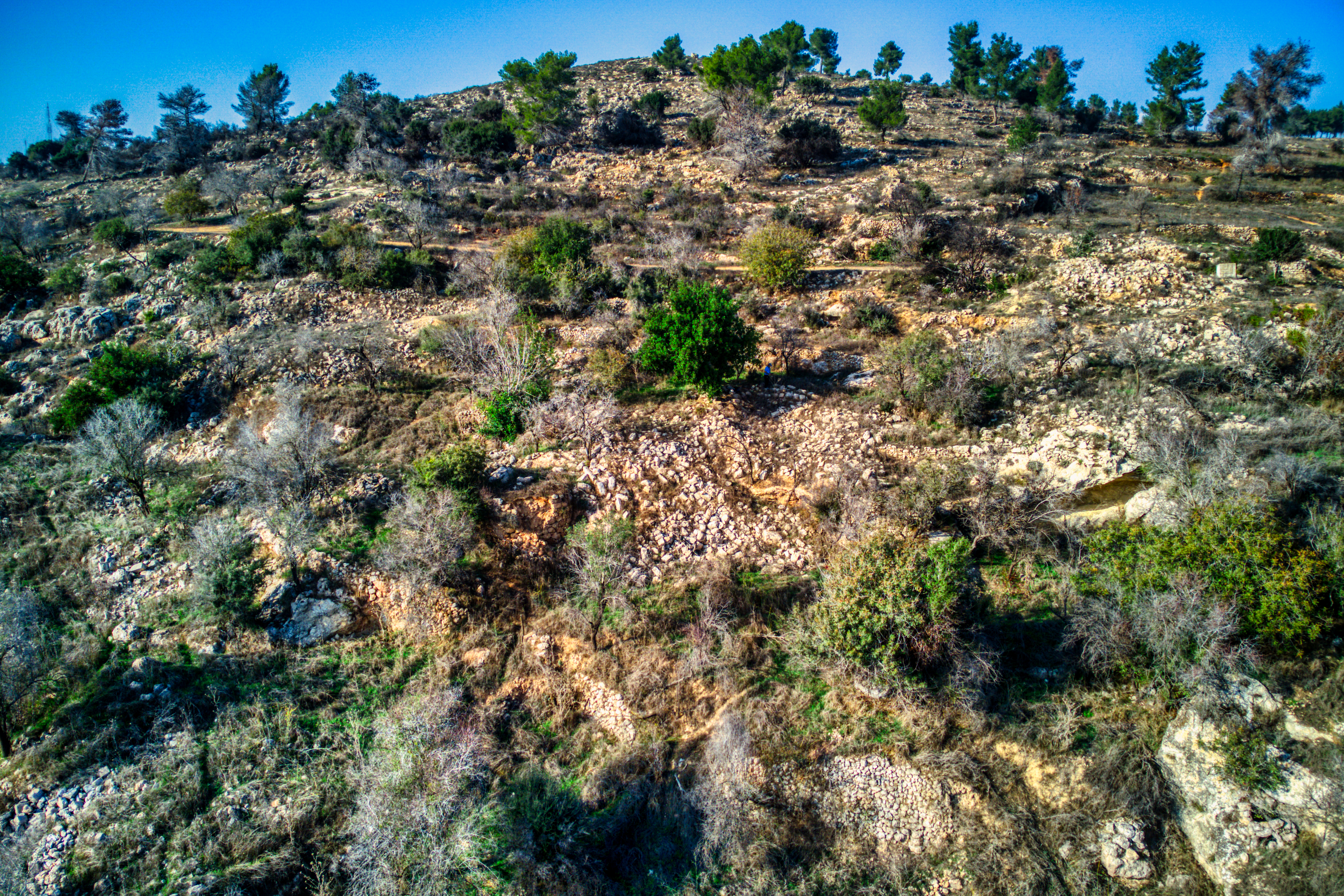
The remains (stone clusters) above and below the path the transcends nowadays through the village remains

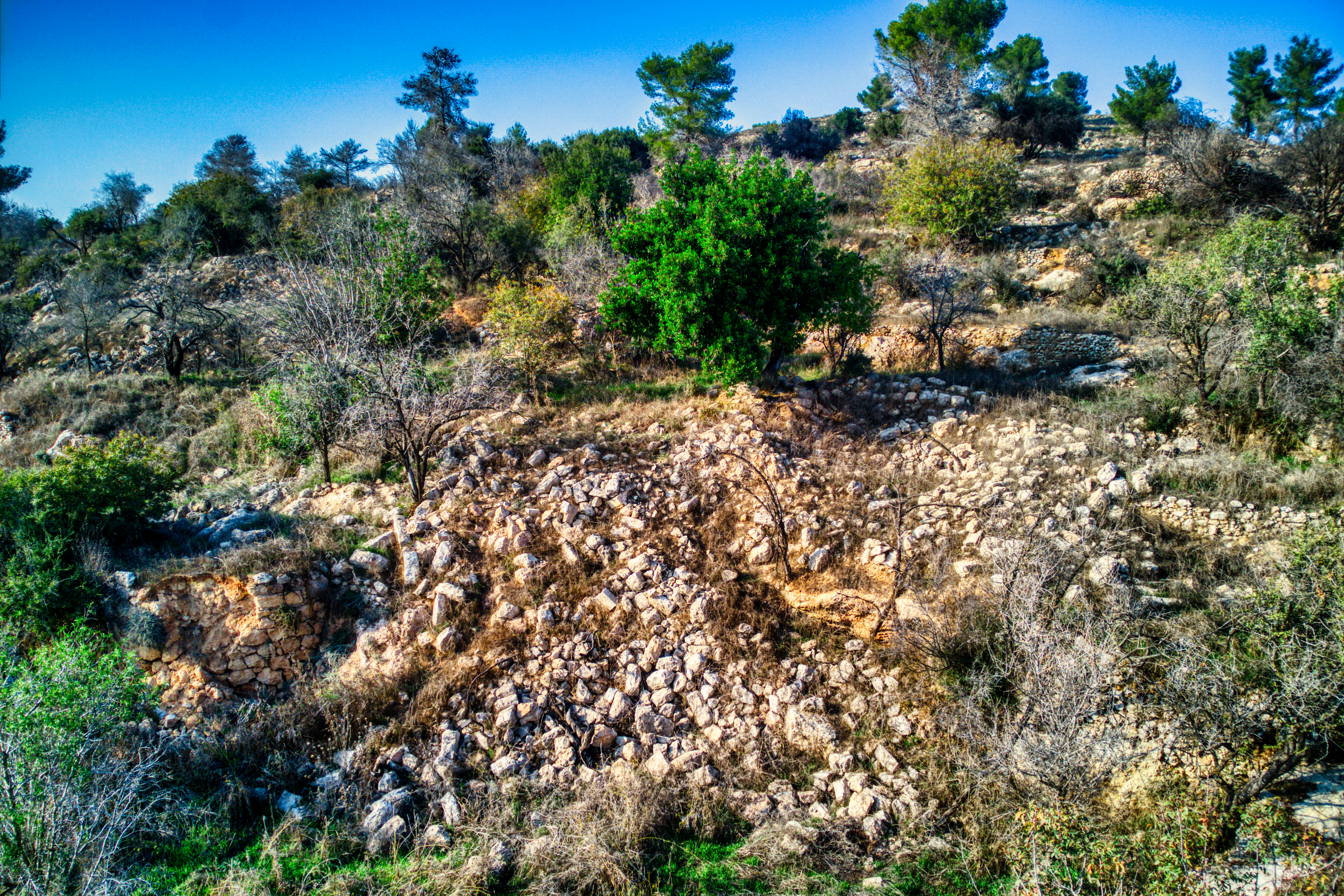
Mulberry tree of the village that remained and around it stones and other residues of houses

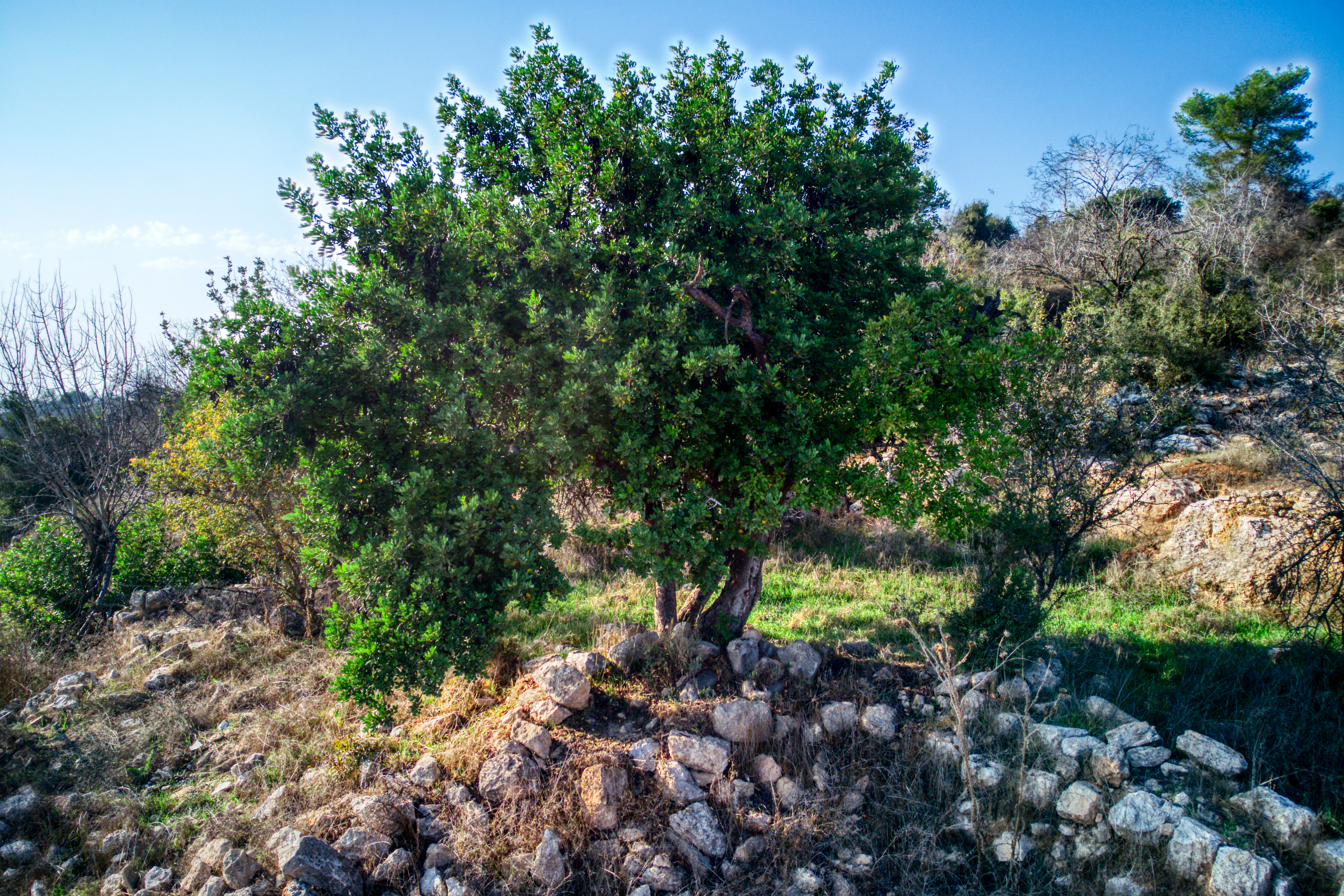
A closer look of the Mulberry tree and the remains

== Bibliography ==
- Barron, J.B., ed. (1923). Palestine: Report and General Abstracts of the Census of 1922. Government of Palestine.
- Conder, C.R.; Kitchener, H.H. (1883). The Survey of Western Palestine: Memoirs of the Topography, Orography, Hydrography, and Archaeology. Vol. 3. London: Committee of the Palestine Exploration Fund.
- Department of Statistics (1945). Village Statistics, April, 1945. Government of Palestine.
- Guérin, V. (1869). Description Géographique Historique et Archéologique de la Palestine (in French). Vol. 1: Judee, pt. 2. Paris: L'Imprimerie Nationale.
- Hadawi, S. (1970). Village Statistics of 1945: A Classification of Land and Area ownership in Palestine. Palestine Liberation Organization Research Center. Archived from the original on 2018-12-08.
- Hartmann, M. (1883). "Die Ortschaftenliste des Liwa Jerusalem in dem türkischen Staatskalender für Syrien auf das Jahr 1288 der Flucht (1871)". Zeitschrift des Deutschen Palästina-Vereins. 6: 102–149.
- Khalidi, W. (1992). All That Remains: The Palestinian Villages Occupied and Depopulated by Israel in 1948. Washington D.C.: Institute for Palestine Studies. ISBN 0-88728-224-5. (pp. 299–300)
- Mills, E., ed. (1932). Census of Palestine 1931. Population of Villages, Towns and Administrative Areas. Jerusalem: Government of Palestine.
- Morris, B. (2004). The Birth of the Palestinian Refugee Problem Revisited. Cambridge University Press. ISBN 978-0-521-00967-6.
- Palmer, E.H. (1881). The Survey of Western Palestine: Arabic and English Name Lists Collected During the Survey by Lieutenants Conder and Kitchener, R. E. Transliterated and Explained by E.H. Palmer. Committee of the Palestine Exploration Fund.
- Robinson, E.; Smith, E. (1841). Biblical Researches in Palestine, Mount Sinai and Arabia Petraea: A Journal of Travels in the year 1838. Vol. 3. Boston: Crocker & Brewster.
- Socin, A. (1879). "Alphabetisches Verzeichniss von Ortschaften des Paschalik Jerusalem". Zeitschrift des Deutschen Palästina-Vereins. 2: 135–163.
- Ze'evi, Dror (1996). An Ottoman century: the district of Jerusalem in the 1600s. SUNY Press. ISBN 0-7914-2915-6. (p. 90)
