= Jerusalem Subdistrict, Mandatory Palestine =

Administrative division of British Palestine (1920–1948)

Coordinates: 32.5833°N 35.0000°E

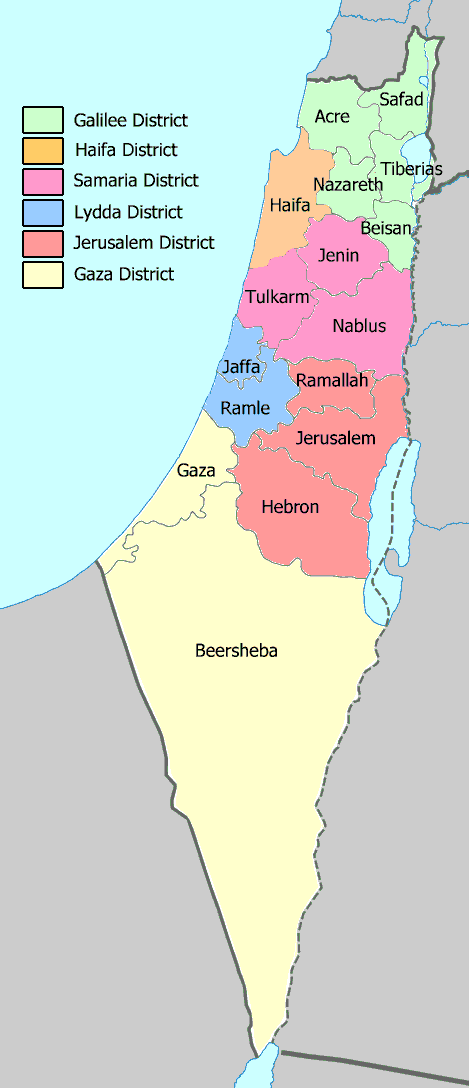
Subdistricts grouped by districts in 1945. Jerusalem Subdistrict as part of Jerusalem District in red.

The Jerusalem Subdistrict was one of the subdistricts of Mandatory Palestine. It was located in and around the city of Jerusalem. After the 1948 Arab–Israeli War, on the Israeli side of the Green Line, the district was integrated into the Jerusalem District. On the other side, the West Bank was annexed into Jordan, the subdistrict was merged with Ramallah Subdistrict to form Jerusalem Governorate, one of three Jordanian governorates in the West Bank.

== Towns and villages ==
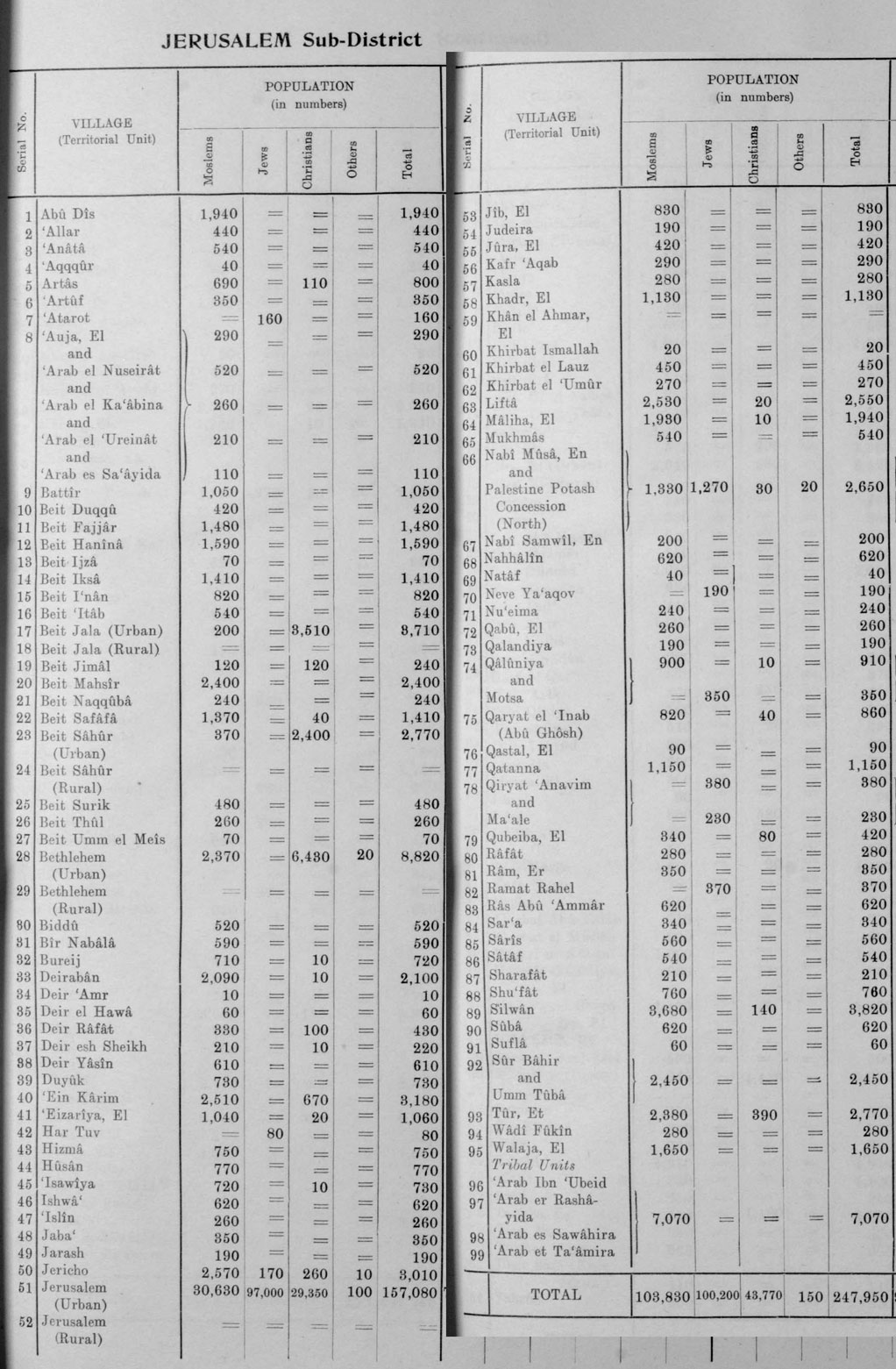
Official population statistics for the sub-district, from Village Statistics, 1945.

Jerusalem Sub-District – Population by Village
Village	Muslims	Jews	Christians	Others	Total
Abu Dis	1,940				1,940
‘Allar	440				440
‘Anata	540				540
‘Aqqua	40				40
Artas	690		110		800
‘Artuf	350				350
‘Atarot		160			160
‘Auja (El)	290				290
‘Arab el Nuseirat	520				520
‘Arab el Ka‘bina	260				260
‘Arab el ‘Ureinat	210				210
‘Arab es Sa‘ayida	110				110
Battir	1,050				1,050
Beit Duqqu	420				420
Beit Fajjar	1,480				1,480
Beit Hanina	1,590				1,590
Beit Ijza	70				70
Beit Iksa	1,410				1,410
Beit I‘nan	820				820
Beit ‘Itab	540				540
Beit Jala (Urban)	200		3,510		3,710
Beit Jala (Rural)					
Beit Jimal	120		120		240
Beit Mahsir	2,400				2,400
Beit Naqquba	240				240
Beit Safafa	1,370		40		1,410
Beit Sahur (Urban)	370		2,400		2,770
Beit Sahur (Rural)					
Beit Surik	480				480
Beit Thul	260				260
Beit Umm el Meis	70				70
Bethlehem (Urban)	2,370		6,430	20	8,820
Bethlehem (Rural)					
Biddu	520				520
Bir Nabala	590				590
Bureij	710		10		720
Deiraban	2,090		10		2,100
Deir ‘Amr	10				10
Deir el Hawa	60				60
Deir Rifat	330		100		430
Deir esh Sheikh	210		10		220
Deir Yasin	610				610
Duyuk	730				730
‘Ein Karim	2,510		670		3,180
‘Eizariya (El)	1,040		20		1,060
Har Tuv		80			80
Hizma	750				750
Husan	770				770
‘Isawiya	720		10		730
‘Ishwa‘	620				620
‘Islin	260				260
Jaba‘	350				350
Jarash	190				190
Jericho	2,570	170	260	10	3,010
Jerusalem (Urban)	30,630	97,000	29,350	100	157,080
Jerusalem (Rural)					
Jib (El)	830				830
Judeira	190				190
Jura (El)	420				420
Kafr ‘Aqab	290				290
Kasla	280				280
Khadr (El)	1,130				1,130
Khan el Ahmar					
Khirbat Ismallah	20				20
Khirbat el Lauz	450				450
Khirbat el ‘Umur	270				270
Lifta	2,530		20		2,550
Malha (El)	1,930		10		1,940
Mukhmas	540				540
Nabi Musa (En)					
Palestine Potash Concession (North)	1,330	1,270	30	20	2,650
Nabi Samwil (En)	200				200
Nabhalin	620				620
Nataf	40				40
Neve Ya‘aqov		190			190
Nu‘eima	240				240
Qabu (El)	260				260
Qalandiya	190				190
Qaluniya	900		10		910
Motza		350			350
Qaryat el ‘Inab (Abu Ghosh)	820		40		860
Qastal (El)	90				90
Qatanna	1,150				1,150
Qiryat ‘Anavim		380			380
Ma‘ale		230			230
Qubeiba (El)	340		80		420
Rafat	280				280
Ram (Er)	350				350
Ramat Rahel		370			370
Ras Abu ‘Ammar	620				620
Sar‘a	340				340
Saris	560				560
Sataf	540				540
Sharafat	210				210
Shufat	760				760
Silwan	3,680		140		3,820
Saba	620				620
Sufla	60				60
Sur Bahir and Umm Tuba	2,450				2,450
Tur (Et)	2,380		390		2,770
Wadi Fukin	280				280
Walaja (El)	1,650				1,650
Tribal Units – ‘Arab Ibn ‘Ubeid, ‘Arab er Rashaida, ‘Arab es Sawahira, ‘Arab et Ta‘amira	7,070				7,070
TOTAL	103,830	100,200	43,770	150	247,950

=== Depopulated towns and villages ===
- Allar
- Aqqur
- Artuf
- Bayt 'Itab
- Bayt Mahsir
- Bayt Naqquba
- Bayt Thul
- Bayt Umm al-Mays
- al-Burayj
- Dayr Aban
- Dayr 'Amr
- Dayr al-Hawa
- Dayr Rafat
- Dayr al-Shaykh
- Deir Yassin
- Ayn Karim
- Ishwa
- Islin
- Khirbat Ism Allah
- Jarash
- al-Jura
- Kasla
- Khirbat Al-Lawz
- Lifta
- al-Maliha
- Nitaf
- al-Qabu
- Qalunya
- al-Qastal
- Ras Abu 'Ammar
- Romema
- Sar'a
- Saris
- Sataf
- Suba
- Sheikh Badr
- Sufla
- Khirbat al-Tannur
- Khirbat al-'Umur
- al-Walaja (later reestablished 2km away)

== The city of Jerusalem under British rule ==
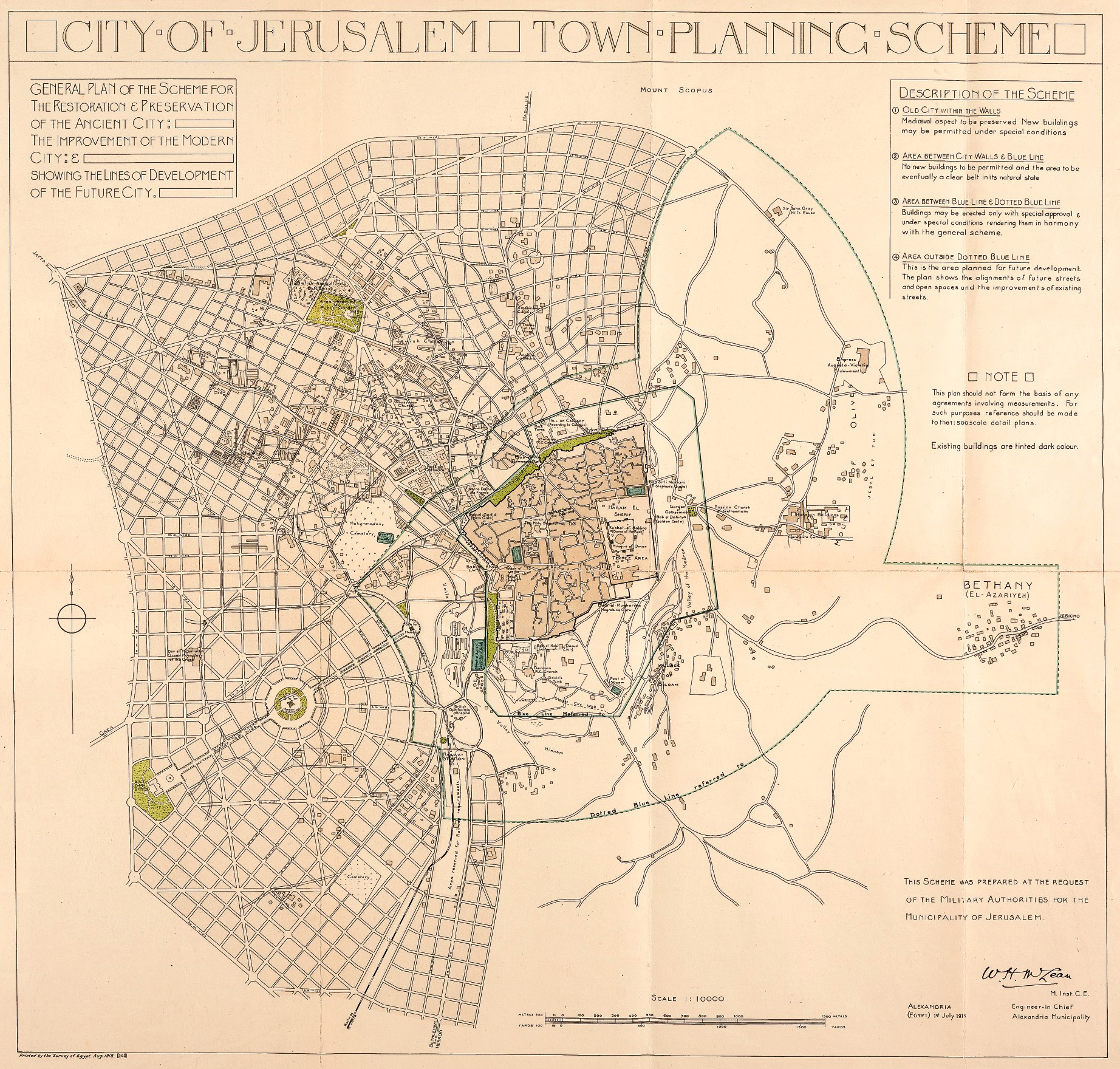
William McLean's 1918 plan was the first urban planning scheme for Jerusalem. It laid the foundations for what became West Jerusalem and East Jerusalem.

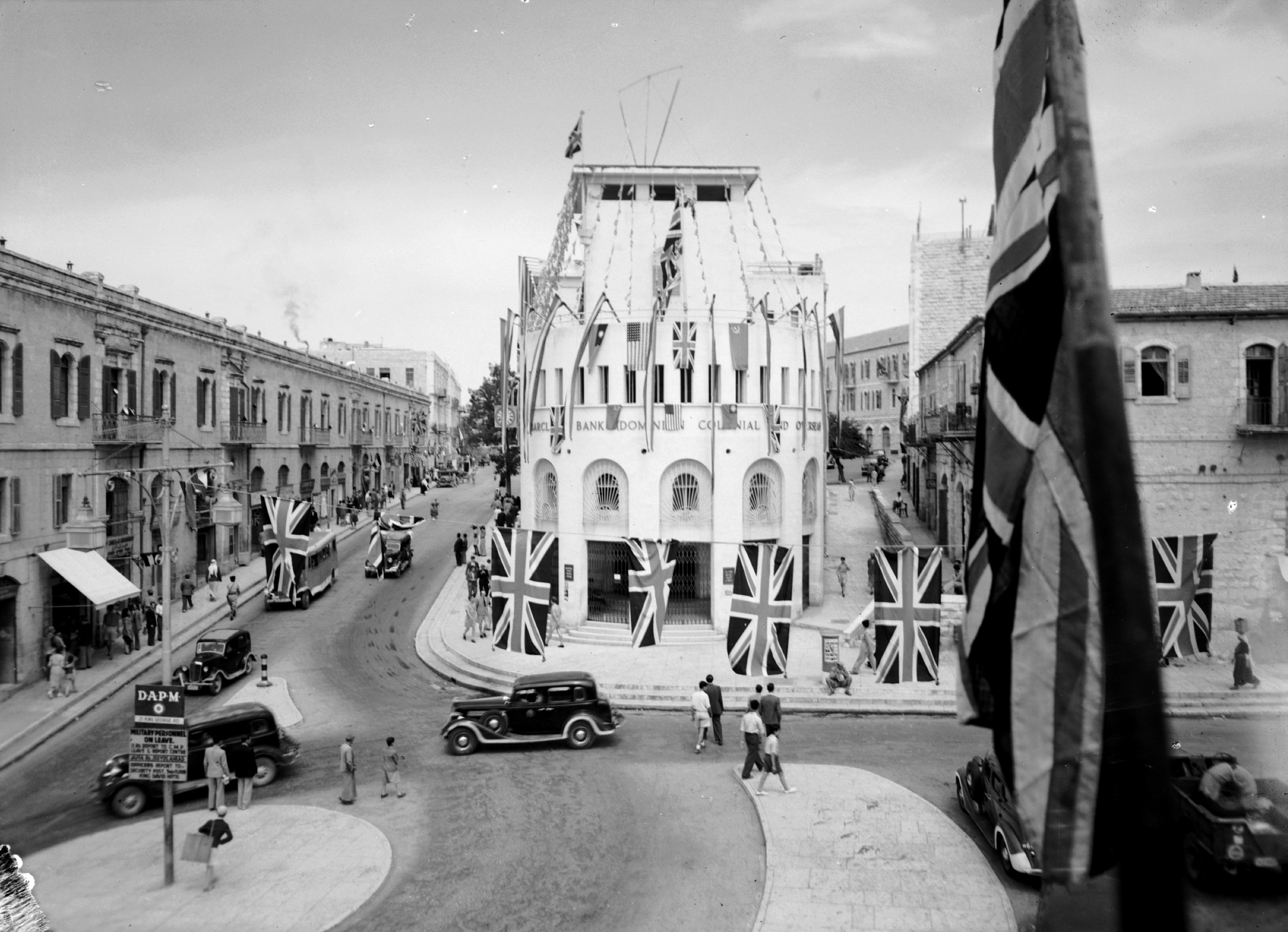
Jerusalem on VE Day, 8 May 1945.

In 1917 after the Battle of Jerusalem, the British Army, led by General Edmund Allenby, captured the city. In 1922, the League of Nations at the Conference of Lausanne entrusted the United Kingdom to administer Palestine, neighbouring Transjordan, and Iraq beyond it.

The British had to deal with a conflicting demand that was rooted in Ottoman rule. Agreements for the supply of water, electricity, and the construction of a tramway system—all under concessions granted by the Ottoman authorities—had been signed by the city of Jerusalem and a Greek citizen, Euripides Mavromatis, on 27 January 1914. Work under these concessions had not begun and, by the end of the war the British occupying forces refused to recognize their validity. Mavromatis claimed that his concessions overlapped with the Auja Concession that the government had awarded to Rutenberg in 1921 and that he had been deprived of his legal rights. The Mavromatis concession, in effect despite earlier British attempts to abolish it, covered Jerusalem and other localities (e.g., Bethlehem) within a radius of 20 km (12 mi) around the Church of the Holy Sepulchre.

From 1922 to 1948 the total population of the city rose from 52,000 to 165,000, comprising two-thirds Jews and one-third Arabs (Muslims and Christians). Relations between Arab Christians and Muslims and the growing Jewish population in Jerusalem deteriorated, resulting in recurring unrest. In Jerusalem, in particular, Arab riots occurred in 1920 and in 1929. Under the British, new garden suburbs were built in the western and northern parts of the city and institutions of higher learning such as the Hebrew University were founded.
