= Bayt Umm al-Mays =

Bayt Umm al-Mays بيت أم الميس
- Etymology: The house of the meis-tree (Cordia myxa)
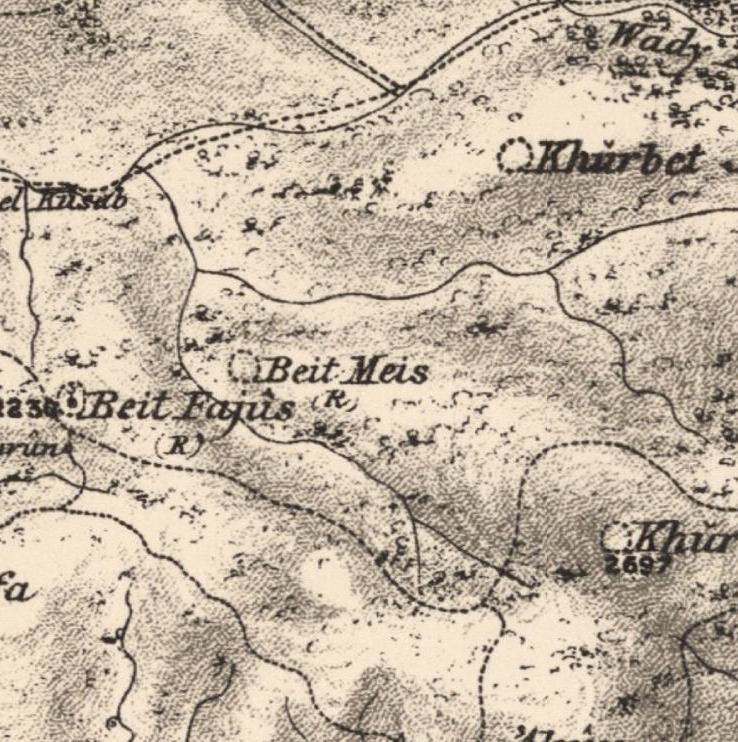
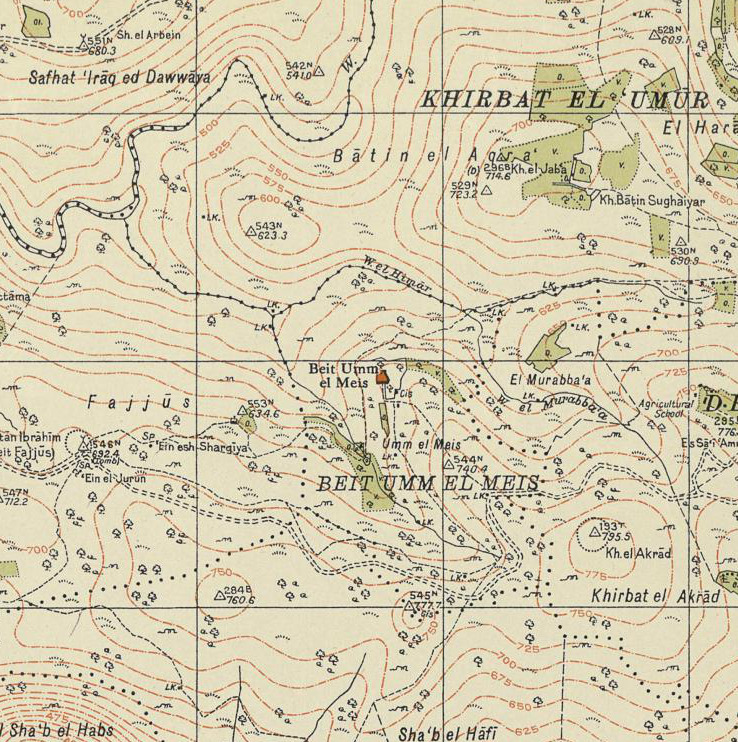
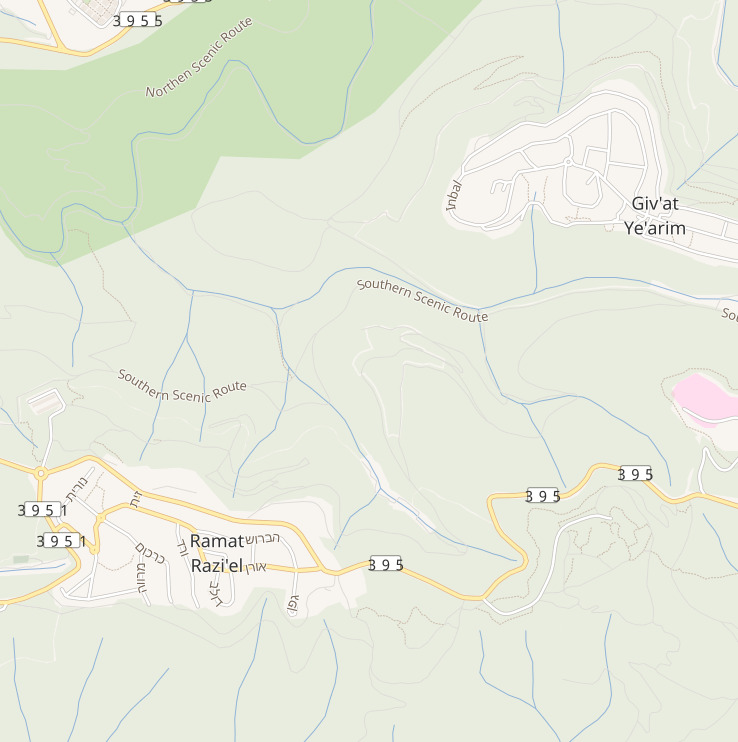
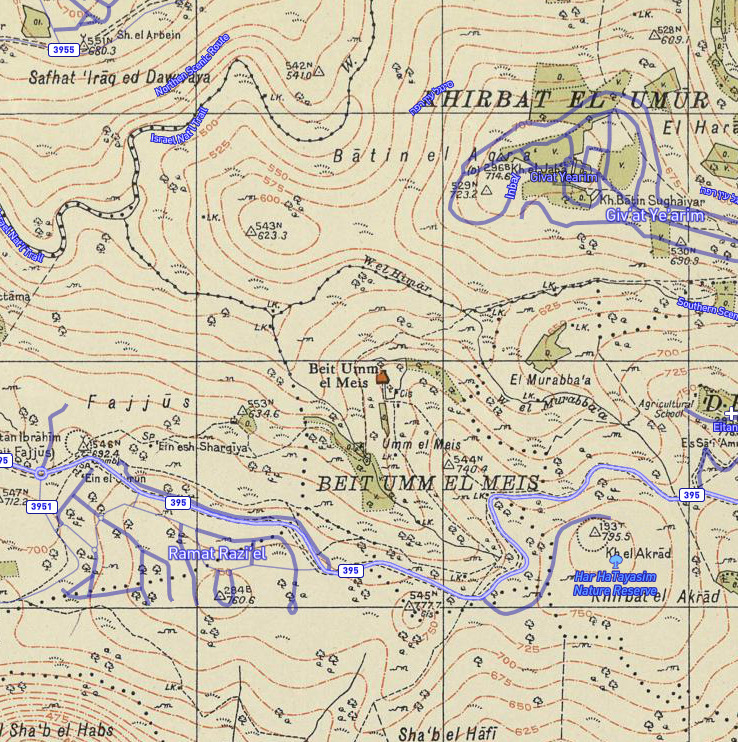
- 1870s map 1940s map modern map 1940s with modern overlay map A series of historical maps of the area around Bayt Umm al-Mays (click the buttons)

- Location within Mandatory Palestine
- Coordinates: 31°46′49″N 35°04′49″E
- Palestine grid: 157/131
- Geopolitical entity: Mandatory Palestine
- Subdistrict: Jerusalem
- Date of depopulation: October 21, 1948

Area
  - Total: 1,013 dunams (1.013 km^{2}; 0.391 sq mi)

Population (1945)
  - Total: 70
- Cause(s) of depopulation: Military assault by Yishuv forces

Bayt Umm al-Mays was a small Palestinian Arab village in the Jerusalem Sub-district, located 14 km west of Jerusalem..

The village was established and settled during the late British Mandatory period, and had 70 inhabitants in 1945. It was depopulated during the 1948 Arab-Israeli War on October 21, 1948, by the Har'el Brigade of Operation ha-Har.

== History ==
In 1863, Victor Guérin found the remains of a small village, in the middle of which was a Muslim sanctuary. He further noted that the villagers had neither wells nor cisterns, but were obliged to fetch water from a rather distant spring.

In 1883, the PEF's Survey of Western Palestine (SWP) noted at Beit Meis: "Ruined walls. No indication of age."

=== British Mandate era ===
In the 1945 statistics, the village had a population of 70 Muslims with 1,013 dunums of land. Of this, 51 dunams were for irrigable land or plantations, 273 for cereals, while 2 dunams were built-up, urban, land.

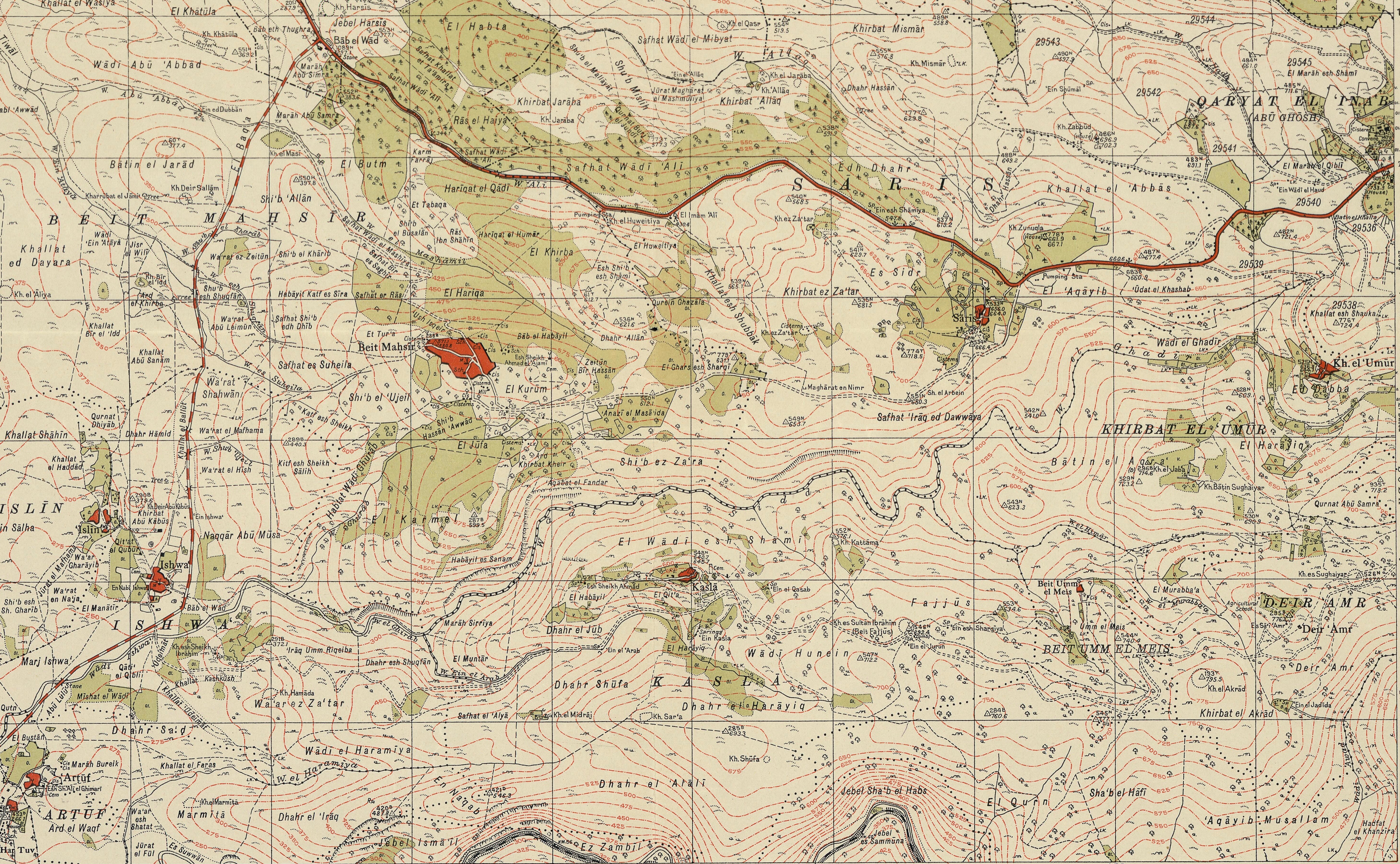
Bayt Umm al-Mays 1943 1:20,000 (lower right quadrant)

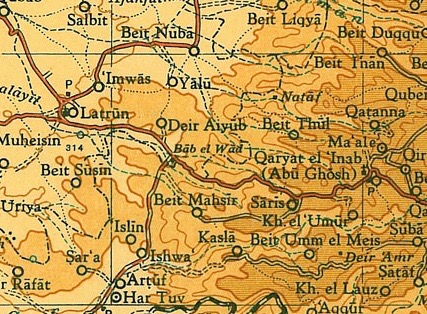
Bayt Umm al-Mays 1945 1:250,000

=== 1948 and aftermath ===
Bayt Umm al-Mays was depopulated October 21, 1948.

Following the war, the area was incorporated into the State of Israel. According to Morris, Ramat Raziel was established near Bayt Umm al-Mays, but according to Khalidi there are no Israeli settlements on village land. In 1992 it was noted that "the site is covered with wild grass that grows around the remains of stone terraces. A few almond, olive and fig trees also grow along the terraces. The remains of the demolished house, which include fragments of an archway, stand at the northern end of the village; the ruins of another house stand at a short distance from the southern end, near a well. Two caves can be seen in the west. There are two very large stone slabs standing at the southern edge of the site, surrounded by bushes."

== Bibliography ==
- Conder, C.R.; Kitchener, H. H. (1883). The Survey of Western Palestine: Memoirs of the Topography, Orography, Hydrography, and Archaeology. Vol. 3. London: Committee of the Palestine Exploration Fund.
- Department of Statistics (1945). Village Statistics, April, 1945. Government of Palestine.
- Guérin, V. (1869). Description Géographique Historique et Archéologique de la Palestine (in French). Vol. 1: Judee, pt. 2. Paris: L'Imprimerie Nationale.
- Hadawi, S. (1970). Village Statistics of 1945: A Classification of Land and Area ownership in Palestine. Palestine Liberation Organization Research Center.
- Khalidi, W. (1992). All That Remains: The Palestinian Villages Occupied and Depopulated by Israel in 1948. Washington D.C.: Institute for Palestine Studies. ISBN 0-88728-224-5.
- Morris, B. (2004). The Birth of the Palestinian Refugee Problem Revisited. Cambridge University Press. ISBN 978-0-521-00967-6.
- Palmer, E. H. (1881). The Survey of Western Palestine: Arabic and English Name Lists Collected During the Survey by Lieutenants Conder and Kitchener, R. E. Transliterated and Explained by E.H. Palmer. Committee of the Palestine Exploration Fund.
