= Dayr al-Hawa =

Dayr al-Hawa دير الهوا
- Etymology: The Monastery of the Wind
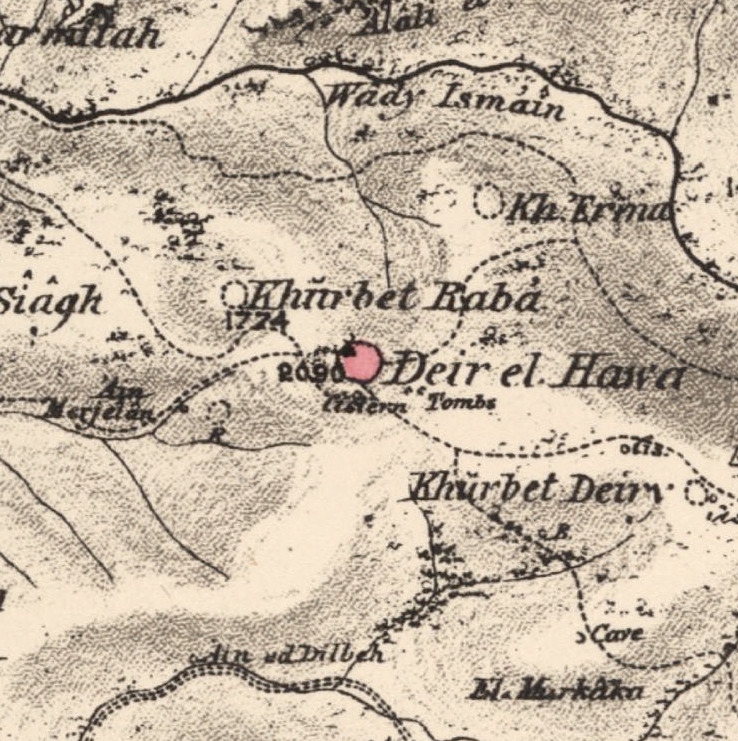
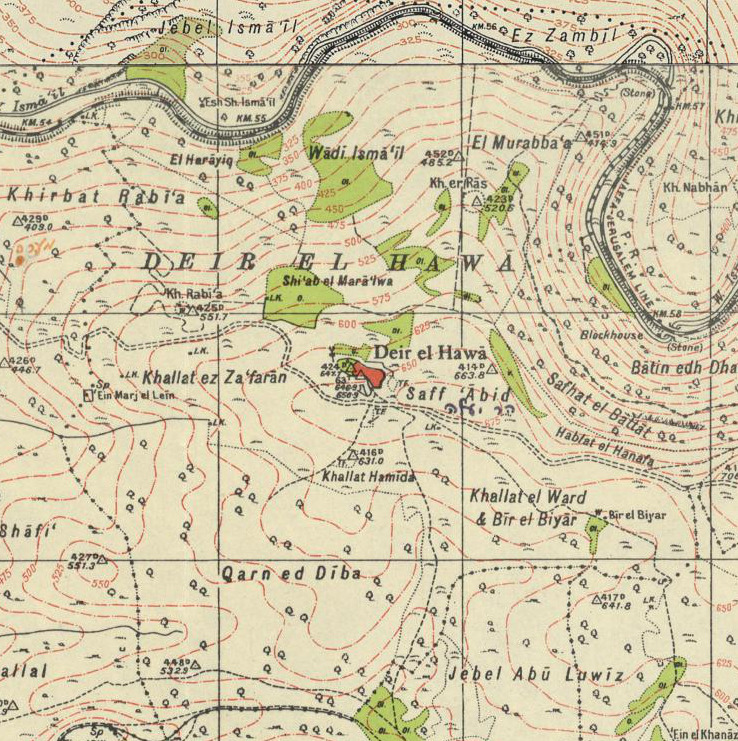
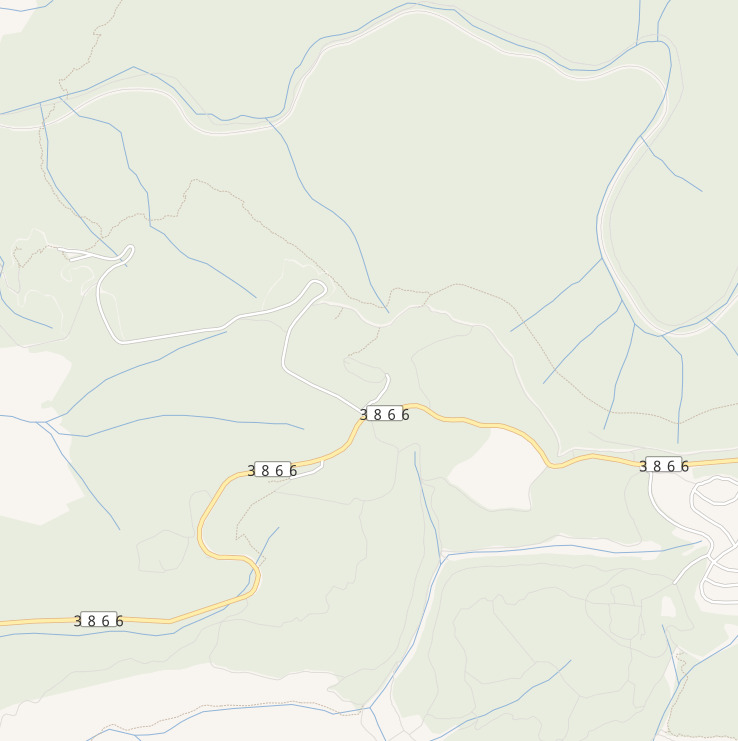
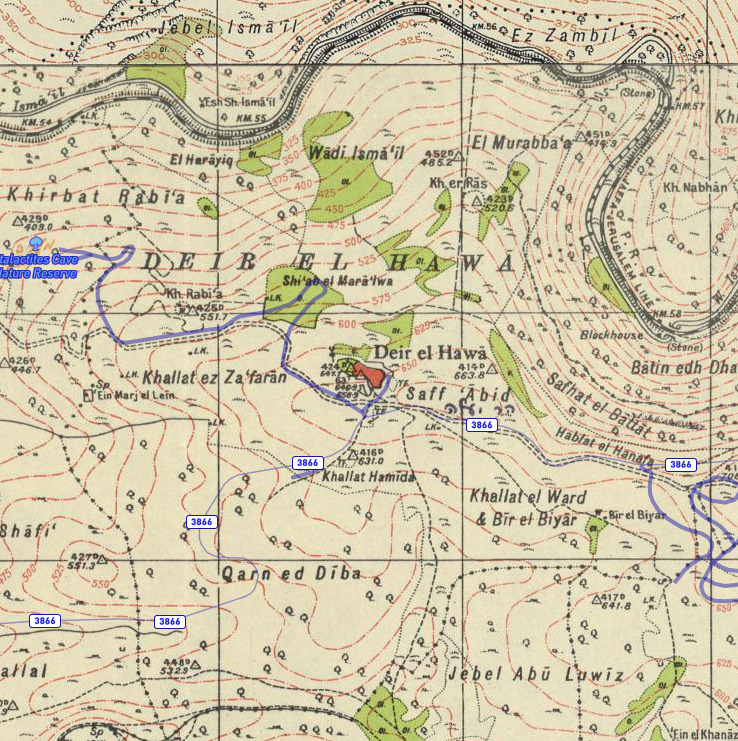
- 1870s map 1940s map modern map 1940s with modern overlay map A series of historical maps of the area around Dayr al-Hawa (click the buttons)

- Location within Mandatory Palestine
- Coordinates: 31°45′05″N 35°02′14″E
- Palestine grid: 153/128
- Geopolitical entity: Mandatory Palestine
- Subdistrict: Jerusalem
- Date of depopulation: October 19–20, 1948

Area
  - Total: 5,907 dunams (5.907 km^{2}; 2.281 sq mi)

Population (1945)
  - Total: 60
- Cause(s) of depopulation: Military assault by Yishuv forces

Dayr al-Hawa (Arabic: دير الهوا) was a Palestinian Arab village in the Jerusalem Subdistrict. The village was depopulated during the 1948 Arab-Israeli War on October 19, 1948, by the Fourth Battalion of the Har'el Brigade of Operation ha-Har. It was located 18.5 km west of Jerusalem.

== History ==
=== Ottoman era ===
Dayr al-Hawa is not mentioned in 16th century records, and was likely first settled in a later period.

In 1838, Edward Robinson called it a "lofty" village, on the brink of a valley. It was further noted as a Muslim village, located in the District of el-Arkub, southwest of Jerusalem. In 1856 the village was named D. el Hawa on Kiepert's map of Palestine published that year.

Victor Guérin, visiting the village in 1863, wrote that Dayr al-Hawa "probably owes its name, monastery of the wind, to its high position".

An Ottoman village list from around 1870 showed that Der el-Hawa had 32 houses and a population of 103, though the population count included men, only.

In 1883, the PEF's Survey of Western Palestine described it as "a village standing high, on a knoll rising from a high ridge, with a deep valley to the north. It has several high houses in it. On the west is a good spring. The ground is covered with brushwood all round the place."

In 1896 the population of Der el-hawa was estimated to be about 162 persons.

=== British Mandate era ===
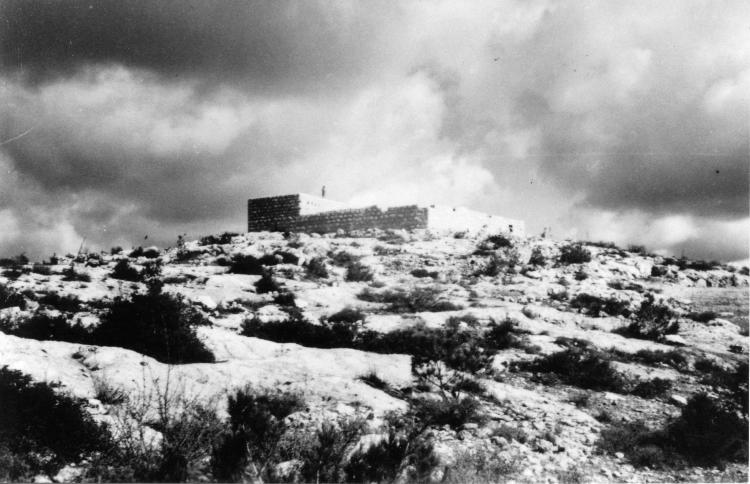
Dayr el-Hawa 1948

In the 1922 census of Palestine conducted i by the British Mandate authorities, Dair al-Hawa had a population of 38 residents; all Muslims, increasing in the 1931 census to 47 inhabitants, in 11 houses.

In the 1945 statistics the village had a population of 60 Muslims, with a total of 5,907 dunums of land. Of this, 58 dunams were for irrigable land or plantations, 1,565 for cereals, while 4 dunams were built-up land.

A mosque was located in the western part of the village and there was a shrine for a local sage known as al-Shaykh Sulayman. Near the ruins of the old village now stands the Israeli moshav, Nes Harim, however, it is not on village land. (It is on the land of Bayt 'Itab.)

During the 1948 it was defended by the local militia and the Egyptian Army/Muslim Brotherhood Battalion.

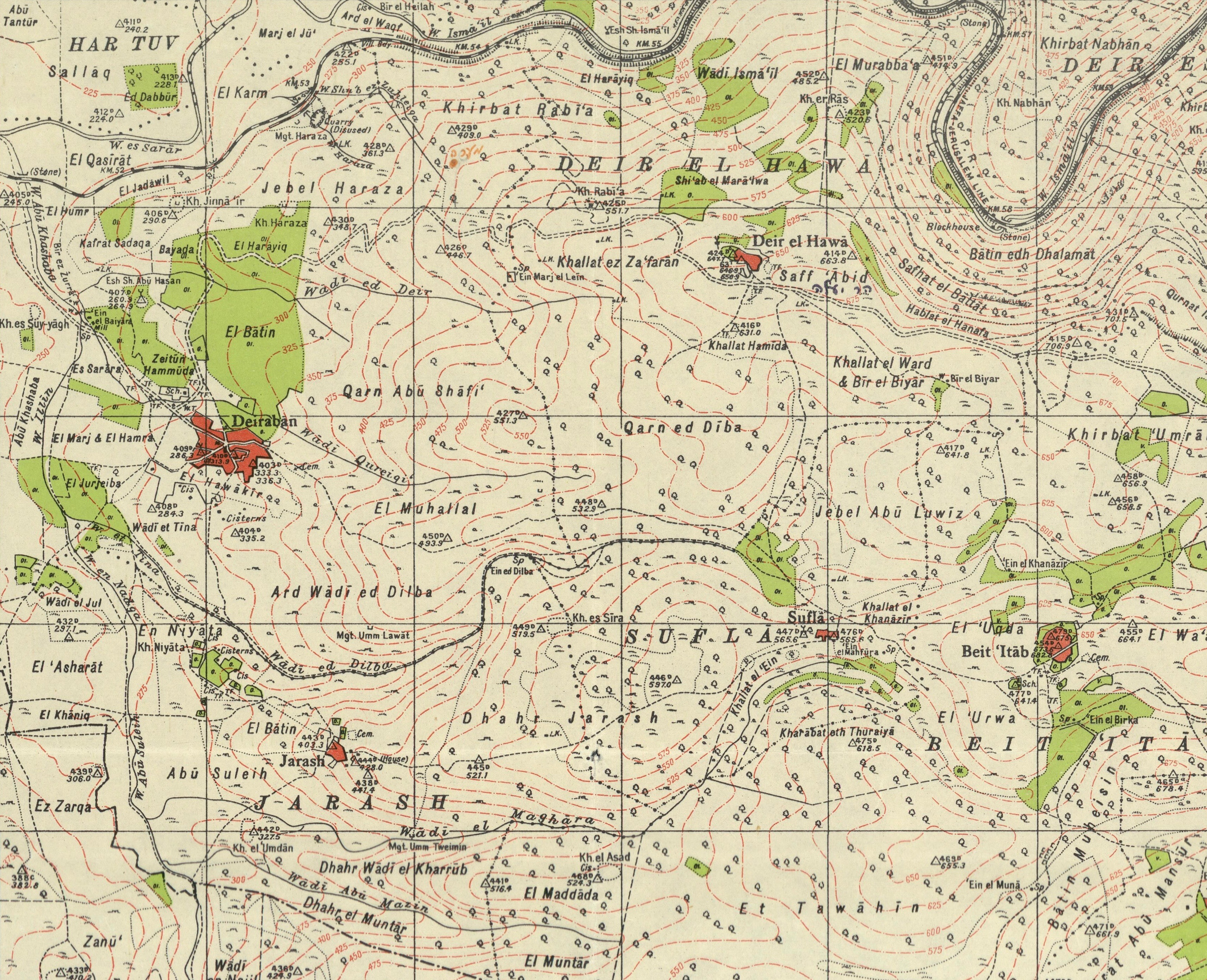
Dayr al-Hawa, Mandate survey, 1:20,000

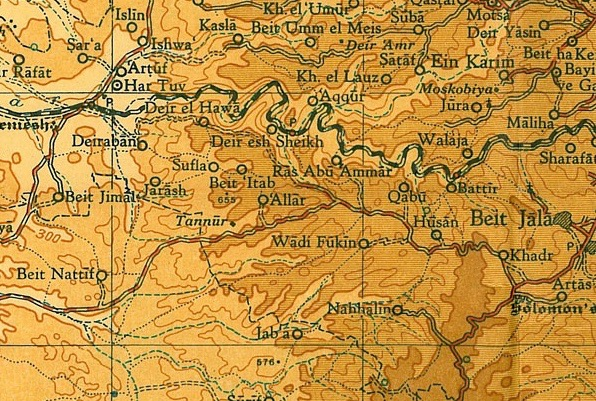
Dayr al-Hawa, 1945, 1:20,000

== Archaeology ==
Coins and ceramics from the Byzantine era have been found here.

== See also ==
- Susan Abulhawa

== Bibliography ==
- Barron, J.B., ed. (1923). Palestine: Report and General Abstracts of the Census of 1922. Government of Palestine.
- Clermont-Ganneau, C.S (1896). [ARP] Archaeological Researches in Palestine 1873-1874, translated from the French by J. McFarlane. Vol. 2. London: Palestine Exploration Fund. (p. 219)
- Conder, C.R.; Kitchener, H.H. (1883). The Survey of Western Palestine: Memoirs of the Topography, Orography, Hydrography, and Archaeology. Vol. 3. London: Committee of the Palestine Exploration Fund.
- Dauphin, C. (1998). La Palestine byzantine, Peuplement et Populations. BAR International Series 726 (in French). Vol. III : Catalogue. Oxford: Archeopress. ISBN 0-860549-05-4.
- Department of Statistics (1945). Village Statistics, April, 1945. Government of Palestine.
- Guérin, V. (1869). Description Géographique Historique et Archéologique de la Palestine (in French). Vol. 1: Judee, pt. 3. Paris: L'Imprimerie Nationale.
- Hadawi, S. (1970). Village Statistics of 1945: A Classification of Land and Area ownership in Palestine. Palestine Liberation Organization Research Center.
- Hartmann, M. (1883). "Die Ortschaftenliste des Liwa Jerusalem in dem türkischen Staatskalender für Syrien auf das Jahr 1288 der Flucht (1871)". Zeitschrift des Deutschen Palästina-Vereins. 6: 102–149.
- Khalidi, W. (1992). All That Remains: The Palestinian Villages Occupied and Depopulated by Israel in 1948. Washington D.C.: Institute for Palestine Studies. ISBN 0-88728-224-5.
- Mills, E., ed. (1932). Census of Palestine 1931. Population of Villages, Towns and Administrative Areas. Jerusalem: Government of Palestine.
- Morris, B. (2004). The Birth of the Palestinian Refugee Problem Revisited. Cambridge University Press. ISBN 978-0-521-00967-6.
- Palmer, E.H. (1881). The Survey of Western Palestine: Arabic and English Name Lists Collected During the Survey by Lieutenants Conder and Kitchener, R. E. Transliterated and Explained by E.H. Palmer. Committee of the Palestine Exploration Fund.
- Robinson, E.; Smith, E. (1841). Biblical Researches in Palestine, Mount Sinai and Arabia Petraea: A Journal of Travels in the year 1838. Vol. 2. Boston: Crocker & Brewster.
- Robinson, E.; Smith, E. (1841). Biblical Researches in Palestine, Mount Sinai and Arabia Petraea: A Journal of Travels in the year 1838. Vol. 3. Boston: Crocker & Brewster.
- Schick, C. (1896). "Zur Einwohnerzahl des Bezirks Jerusalem". Zeitschrift des Deutschen Palästina-Vereins. 19: 120–127.
- Socin, A. (1879). "Alphabetisches Verzeichniss von Ortschaften des Paschalik Jerusalem". Zeitschrift des Deutschen Palästina-Vereins. 2: 135–163.
