= Kfar Uria =

Kfar Uria: כפר אוריה (Hebrew)
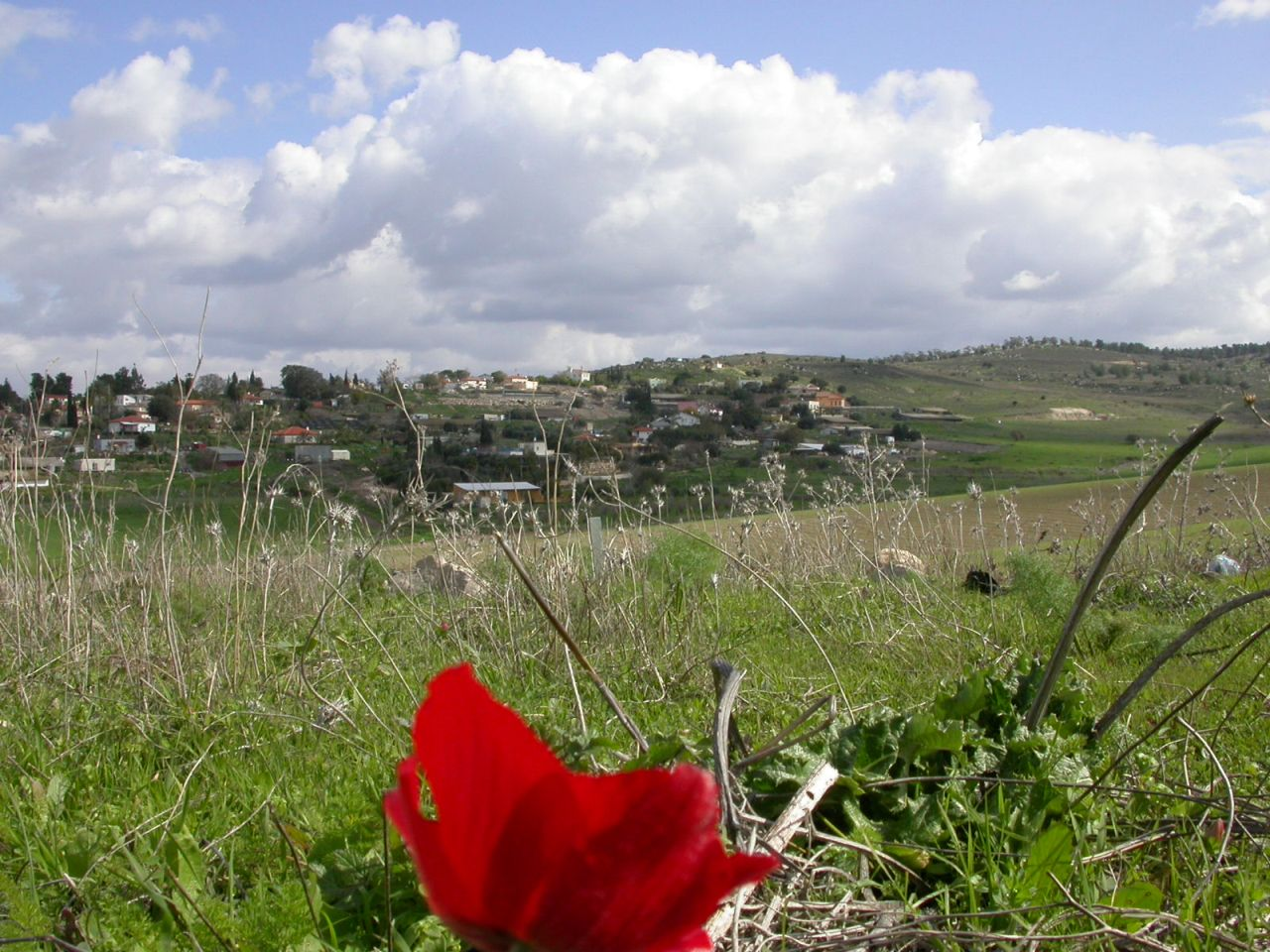
- Kfar Uria, 2006

- Location within Jerusalem District
- Coordinates: 31°47′37″N 34°56′54″E
- Country: Israel
- District: Jerusalem
- Council: Mateh Yehuda
- Affiliation: Moshavim Movement
- Founded: 1912 (original village); 1944 (first re-establishment); 1949 (second re-establishment)
- Population (2024): 817

Kfar Uria (Hebrew: כְּפַר אוּרִיָּה, lit. 'Uriah Village') is a moshav in central Israel, located near Beit Shemesh in the Shephelah. It falls under the jurisdiction of Mateh Yehuda Regional Council, and in 2024, it had a population of 817.

== History ==
The place was originally called "Kiryat Moshe", after Moshe Mordechai Manisewicz, one of the leaders of the Bialystok Association, but the village's name was changed to Kfar Uria due to the similarity of the sounds to the name of the Arab village of Kafrûria, an "abandoned or sparsely populated" estate situated about half a kilometer west of the new settlement. These lands were to serve as an agricultural training place. Among the village's early founders and residents was A. D. Gordon.

In December 1912, Ha-Tsfira published that a deal to purchase the land was approved by the Pasha, despite the ban on Jews purchasing land. But as the purchase was done by people that according to the Pasha are real farmers – Menashe Meirowitz and others from Rishon Lezion, Rehovot and Gedera, who, the ban did not apply on them. The land of an area of about 5000 dunams, was purchased from three Christian brothers and it was described as:

"Half of it is plain land and fertile valleys, between the Judean mountains, which are very capable of sowing grain, and half of it is fertile land capable of olive and almond orchards. This village also has water springs, with whose waters you can irrigate fodder fields and engage in cattle breeding." There are also several buildings surrounded by hundreds of olive and almond trees and other species."

In fact, the place was purchased by the Geula company. As described by Shmuel Dayan, the purchase was made earlier, and for some time the fields were leased to the surrounding Arabs.

In early 1913, Meir Rothberg invited the "Sajra gang", which included mong 13 others, A. D. Gordon, Noah Naftolsky, Yitzhak Tabenkin, Eva Tabenkin, Ben-Zion Israeli, Yosef Salzman and Yitzhak Finerman, to come and settle the place under the public administration of the Israel Ministry. The group lived in Khan Kfar Uria and stayed there close to a year. On November 2, 1913, they left the place due to the transfer of the area to private management.

By mid-1913, the place was sold to thirty families of Bialystok Jews who bought it with the help of the Berlin Society for the Settlement of the Land of Israel (ICA). Following this, Eliezer Krasner was appointed as manager and he brought laborers to establish farms for the owners. The first group of laborers left the place as they claimed that Krasner lacks managerial experience and engages in religious coercion. Religious workers were brought to replace them. In February 1914 the place suffered from an attack by the Arabs of the area. In May 1914, Eliezer Krasner was fired and in his place was brought a family of supervisors. In July of that year, 25 Jewish laborers and 20 Arab laborers worked on the farm.

After World War I a work group of Levi Eshkol arrived to Kfar Urias and stayed there for about two years. At the beginning of 1920, a group of 14 workers stayed there but later that year, they moved to Degania Bet on the occasion of the settlement of the landowners there.

Later that year, representatives of five families from Bialystok Jews came to the place and in 1921 eight families out of 30 people who were land owners. Another 11 of the land owners lived in the Land of Israel but not in the settlement and the rest were abroad. This situation meant that tax debts accumulated on the uncultivated lands. Attempts to find Jewish tenants for the land to pay the tax were unsuccessful and there was an intention to lease the land to Arabs.

According to a census conducted in 1922 by the British Mandate authorities, Kfar Uria had a population of 40 Jews. The census in 1931 recorded 10 Muslim inhabitants living in 2 houses.

In the 1929 Palestine riots 300 Arab rioters from Jerusalem attacked Kfar Uria, with some local help, robbed and burned down the village. The inhabitants of the adjacent Arab villages for the most part were on good terms with the village's residents and many treated the moshav's association director, Baruch Yakimovsky, as their mukhtar (village chief). He was on amicable terms with mukhtars in surrounding villages. The farmers of the area, both Jews and Arabs, cooperated and defended each other against raiding nomadic Bedouin.

Six Jewish families who had stayed behind were later smuggled out by the mukhtar of Beit Far via one of the ancient natural tunnels that crisscrosses the area. Yakimovsky managed, with the cooperation of some local mukhtars to work Kfar Uria's land for a few more years. In 1944, Jewish stonecutters from Kurdistan rebuilt the village on the ruins of the original site, around 1.5 km north-west Khirbat Ism Allah, but not on village land.

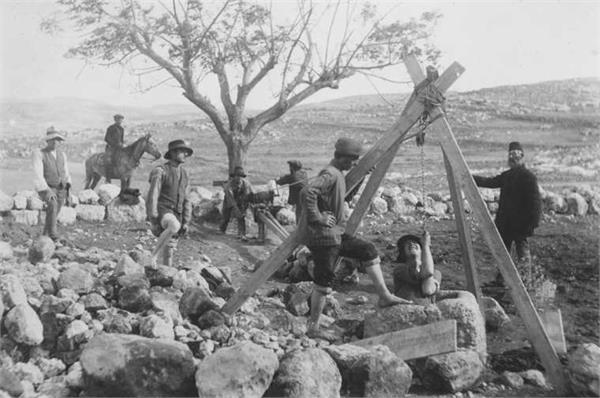
Kfar Uria village well 1912

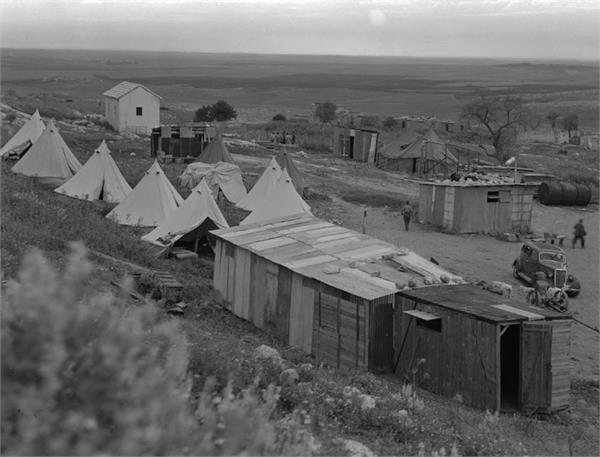
Kfar Uria 1945

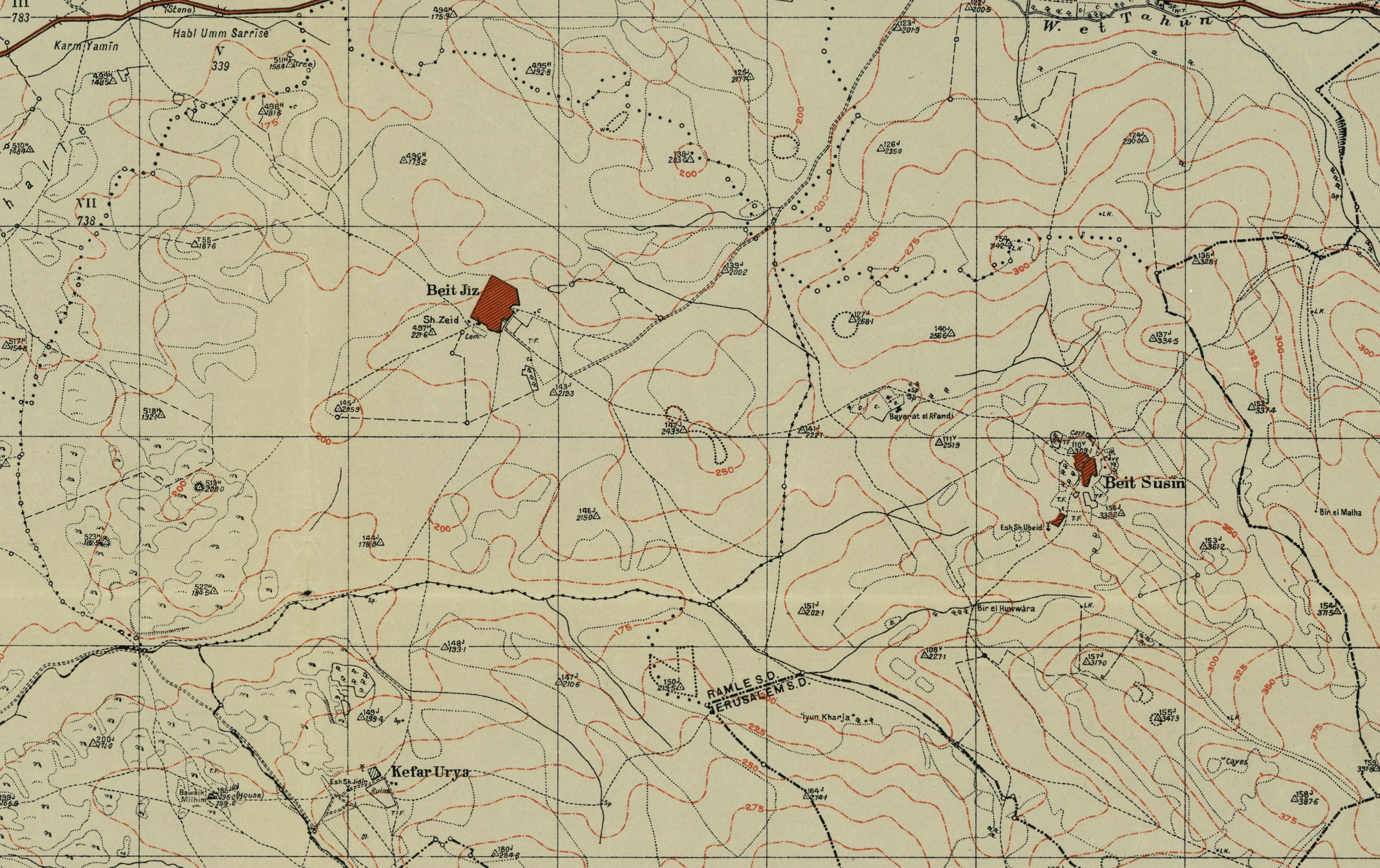
Kfar Uria 1942 1:20,000

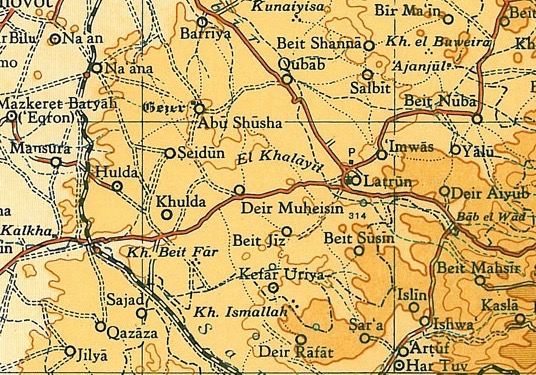
Kfar Uria 1945 1:250,000

In March 1947, an Arab shepherd was killed by gunfire in the moshav's fields after shepherds from Bayt Jiz came onto the fields of the village with their flocks and a crowd threatened the Notrim. On January 10, 1948, a convoy of Hish personnel traveling from the village towards Hulda was attacked by Arabs from Beit Far, two of the defenders in the convoy were killed by gunfire. The next day, on January 11, the village was attacked by a mob of Arabs. The defenders launched a counterattack on the Arabs in Khirbet Beit Far. The estimates say that 25 Arab attackers were killed during the attack, among them members of the Arab Legion and Arab policemen. Haganah guards murdered without provocation an Arab peasant couple near the village soon after, in February of that year.

A third attempt to settle the area was undertaken in 1949, when a moshav was established on the site. The village name is similar to that of Khirbet Cafarorie, a ruin located south – west of the village, which had a rock-hewn winepress, a mosaic and burial caves.

The village center features an old Khan, which once hosted the agricultural training workers, including A. D. Gordon. The Khan structure remains to this day at the heart of the community, but it requires renovations and therefore closed to visitors.

Between 2009 and 2011 a new neighborhood was built and populated with 69 new houses and families.

In 2013, an archaeological survey was conducted at the site by Irina Zilberbod on behalf of the Israel Antiquities Authority (IAA).

== Landmarks ==
In 1970, Israeli artist Avraham Ofek created a mural for the community center at Kfar Uria.

== See also ==
- Israeli art
