= Allah (disambiguation) =

Allah (Arabic: الله) is the word for "God" in Arabic.

It may also refer to:

- the Islamic conception of God: see God in Islam
- Allah as a lunar deity, theory in 20th century scholarship re pre-Islamic Arabia

== Geography ==
- Allah Valley, valley of the Allah River, Mindanao, Philippines
- Allah, a town in Nigeria also known as Illah
- Allah, a village in Arizona.

== See also ==
- Allahu Akbar (disambiguation)
- Ullah ("of God" in Arabic)
- Alla (disambiguation)
- Illah (disambiguation)
- Allar (disambiguation)
- Aella (disambiguation)
- Aello, one of the Harpy sisters in ancient Greek mythology
- Clara "Allah" Knight, nanny of Queen Elizabeth the Queen Mother and Elizabeth II
- Clarence 13X, also known as Allah the Father, founder of the Five Percent Nation
