= Operation HaHar =

1948 Israeli assault on village cluster

- Part of the 1948 Arab–Israeli War
- Bayt Nattif after capture, 1948
| Date | October 19–24, 1948 |
| Location | South and East of Beit Shemesh |
| Result | Israeli victory |
| Territorial changes | IDF succeed in capturing Dayr Aban, Dayr al-Hawa, and surrounding villages |

Belligerents
| Israel (IDF) | (Kingdom of Egypt) Egyptian paramilitary forces and local militias; (Jordan) Transjordan (Arab Legion) |

Commanders and leaders
| (Israel) General Zvi Ayalon (Israel) Joseph Tabenkin | (Kingdom of Egypt) Farouk of Egypt (Jordan) Glubb Pasha |

Strength
| 1,400 | 1,300 |

Casualties and losses
| 1 | Unknown |

Operation HaHar (Hebrew: ההר, The Mountain), or Operation El HaHar, was an Israeli Defence Forces campaign against villages southwest of Jerusalem launched at the end of October 1948. The operation lasted from 19 to 24 October and was carried out by troops from the Harel and Etzioni Brigades. The villages were defended by units from the Egyptian army and local militias. By the end of the campaign over a dozen villages had been captured. It coincided with Operation Yoav which attacked Egyptian positions further south.

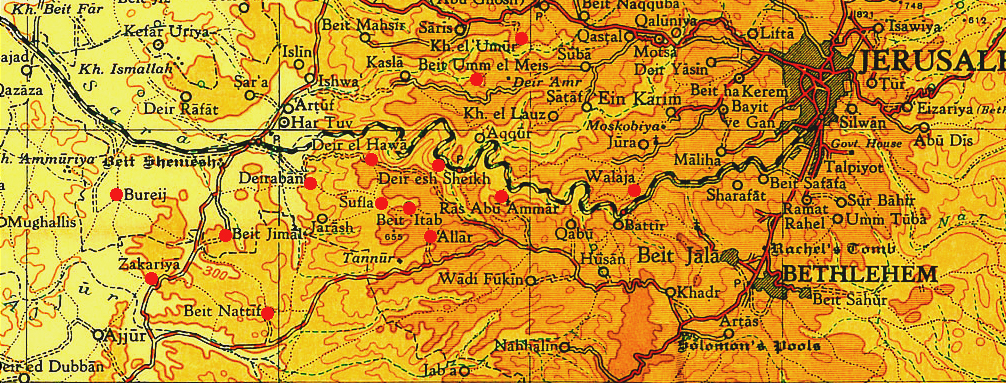
Villages captured during Operation Ha-Har, October 1948.

== Background ==
In mid-October 1948, the Har’el Brigade published a combat ordinance, which read: "The enemy is planning to cut-off the well-springs of immigration and [Jewish] settlement, to build a nest of war conspiracies against us and against all those who love peace in the world, to cut-off from Israel the Negev; to inflict harm to the capital, the center of yearnings of the generations of Israel; to subjugate the Hebrew element of Jerusalem; to dismantle Jewish industry; to block-off the sea; to deny the independence of Haifa and its port. These schemes will be eradicated on the battlefield." Up until that time, the Brigade had been active in capturing infiltrators who sought to carry out attacks against Jews and their property, as also in securing the public transportation to Jerusalem.

The Regimental Operations Department initiated patrols south of the Jerusalem Corridor. They assumed that when fighting resumed, the task of the Brigade would be to expand the corridor southward. Thus, before Operation El Ha-Har (Unto the Mountaintop) was approved, "Raanana" (Eliyahu Sela), the Officer in charge of Regimental Operations, had informed the Fourth and the Fifth battalions about the plan to take military action in the area of Beit Jimal and Dayr al-Hawa, and gave orders unto them to carry out reconnaissance missions with a view of watching enemy movement in that territory and to prepare an operational plan for the conquering of those villages if and when the fighting should be renewed.

In a written dispatch, "Raanana" had informed Palmach-Harel headquarters responsible for the central front: "In all these last few days, the enemy has not ceased from his own operations in this sector [of the country]. There has been an exchange of unrelenting gun-fire. The strategic location itself is not easy to hold-on to, since it is much lower than the other positions. Our suggestion would be, 1) consolidating and expanding the position by occupying other positions, with additional operations conducted by small raiding parties; the addition of 120 mm. mortar for this area; 2) In the event that operations should be halted, a call to the United-Nations for a cease-fire." "Raanana" waited impatiently for a prompt answer, but his request to "occupy other positions" was denied him. Nevertheless, in spite of being denied, these positions were still taken by force when operations began, the Har’el Brigade continuously moving and extending the border of Jewish hegemony as far as Wādi Surar (Nahal Sorek), where it was also deemed necessary to establish a military outpost beyond its south bank.

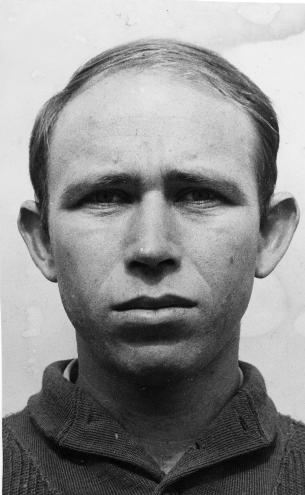
Eliyahu "Raanana" Sela, Officer of Regimental Operations

=== Preparations for war ===
In the meantime, Palmach-Harel headquarters continued to make suggestions to the higher military echelon on ways in which the Jerusalem Corridor could be better secured by extending its control over other vital areas. "Having prevailed upon their officers, the Officer of Special Operations, unto whom was made available a vast quantity of weapons for the prosecution of that war, was given the liberty to make preparations for war and was tasked with drawing-up a series of military plans, which he did in consultation with the brigade commander and the battalion commanders." The plan of military action which they devised called out for an integrated unit consisting of the Fourth, Fifth and Sixth battalions, the 10th Armored Brigade (Hebrew: חטיבה 10), Intelligence unit, logistics officers, transportation, medical services, saboteurs, corps of engineers, artillery officer, quartermaster and personnel administration. "Raanana", at this time, felt confident that he now had everything that he needed to plan and execute military operations that would result in widening Israel's control over the Jerusalem Corridor southward, as far as the Elah Valley, including that road that branched off between the Shaar HaGai - Bayt Jibrin highway, and ascended eastward through the Elah Valley as far as al-Khader (today, regional highway 375). The Brigade was initially supposed to take-up a position on a mountain in the vicinity of the Arab village, Ḥousan, and what was then known as "the Fork" (now, Tzur Hadassa), and to be on stand-by for further movement, if called for, in the direction of Gush-Etzion, Hebron, Bayt Jala and Bethlehem.

=== Renewed fighting ===
Hostilities began on 15 October 1948, when Israeli troops assigned to Operation Yoav took the offensive to the south, opposite Egyptian army positions in the northern Negev. The Har’el Brigade, stationed further north, remained inactive for four days, a decision taken by the IDF's General Staff and which, for political reasons, wanted to see first whether or not the Jordanian Arab Legion would react. On 19 October, when the "junction" in the south was captured and there was once again an unobstructed land-link with settlements in the Negev, the Brigade was given leave to commence military operations in its sector of the country. Among the considerations for permitting the Brigade to start its offensive was that the Arab Legion had not intervened in Israeli military operations in the northern Negev, while there was also some concern that the United Nations Security Council might call for a cease-fire on 19 October. If that were to happen, the Brigade would have lost its opportunity to expand the Jerusalem Corridor by ridding it of hostile elements.

=== Fall of Dayr Aban ===
The Jordanian Arab Legion had decided to concentrate its forces in Bethlehem and in Hebron in order to save that district for its Arab inhabitants, and to prevent territorial gains for Israel. With the war raging in the south between Israeli soldiers assigned to Operation Yoav and Egyptian forces, the Har’el Brigade set out in its mission with two objectives in mind, namely, extension of Jewish control over the Jerusalem Corridor by cutting-off pockets of resistance, viz. Egyptian forces that were operating in the immediate region, while simultaneously making an effort not to inadvertently draw the Arab Legion into armed conflict with Israeli forces. On the moon-lit night of 19 October, the troops of the Har'el Brigade commenced operations which were later coined "El Ha-Har", moving to capture Dayr Aban (to the south of Mahseya) where there was located the 'Joint' military outpost in which, both, Egyptian forces joined by local militias from Dayr Aban lay on the one side, and Israeli troops on the other, had taken-up positions at a distance of sixty metres from each other. Egyptian forces lay to the east, while Israeli forces to the west. The attack was spearheaded by a company of men conscripted from abroad (Hebrew: אנשי גח"ל), accompanied with artillery fire and "Davidka" mortars. They also made use of a stratagem whereby, in the night, they played on a phonograph the sound of rapid machine-gun fire, which blared loudly over the loudspeakers. The sudden onslaught and bombardment, along with the noise, had its desired effect, causing a retreat of all Egyptian forces from the Arab village. During this battle, Israeli forces suffered only one casualty, the deputy battalion commander of operations belonging to the Fifth Battalion, who had stepped momentarily out of his bunker to view the surgical attack.

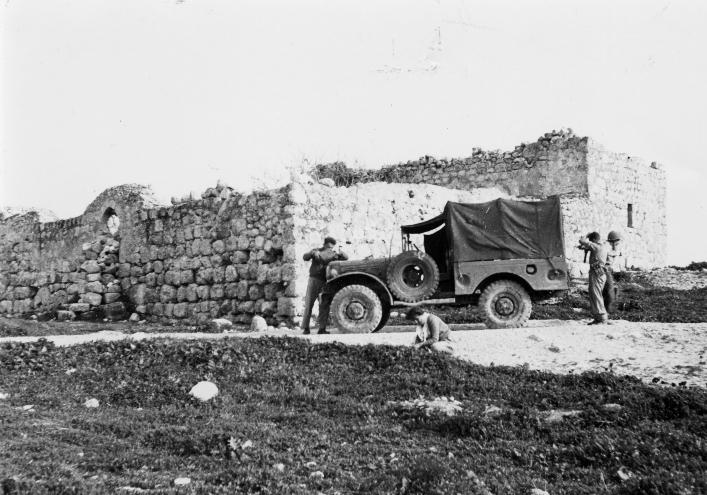
Harel 4th Battalion west of the "Joint" military outpost, at commencement of operation

=== Fall of Dayr al-Hawa ===
From there, the Brigade proceeded to climb higher ground until it reached the crest of the mountain range where it received orders to arrange for the military occupation and capture of Dayr al-Hawa (site of the present-day Nes Harim), a village perched at an elevation of some 637 meters above sea-level. This was done with the intent of making it a springboard for further military operations while advancing toward the mountains overlooking al-Khader, Bethlehem and Hebron. The Brigade began sending out armed patrol-parties of two to three men in order to acquaint themselves with the terrain, and to learn about the feasibility of sending out greater forces to infiltrate enemy lines. The plan was to cross-over the railroad line that connected Jerusalem with Hartuv. Scouts succeeded in crossing over the railway without being detected, and reached a position southwest of Dayr al-Hawa. When a second detail was sent out to ascertain whether or not the route could be traversed, they were ambushed by gunfire, which caused the party to retreat. A third detail sent out was also fired upon, which actions taken together gave the Brigade a correct assessment of the enemy's preparedness for battle. Given these circumstances, plans were drawn-up for the attack on Dayr al-Hawa.

Two companies attacked Dayr al-Hawa. In addition to the massive firepower from their personal weapons, they were also aided by a 120 mm. mortar battery. When they had come within 200 meters of the village, the firing of auxiliary weapons used to assist them in the initial onslaught was brought to a halt. Another force assaulted the village from a different side. The villagers, being attacked from in front and from behind, soon capitulated. By midnight, units of the Fourth Battalion had taken full command of the village Dayr al-Hawa where they found the villagers had fled with their animals. At this success, they began making preparations for further action. In the process of taking the village, three companies with support weapons, accompanied by armored vehicles, had ascended the mountain. In the coordinated attacks, the Har’el Brigade had captured three military outposts: the 'House' outpost, the 'Cannon' outpost and the 'Joint' military outpost. In each of them, the Brigade initially met-up with some resistance. Tabenkin recalls: "When the 'Joint' outpost and Dayr al-Hawa had been captured, there was created for us the preeminence of decisive force, and we then decided to move also by day... When dawn broke [the following morning], it was decided that the soldiers of the Fifth Battalion would proceed unto Bayt Nattif with the intent, that after the capture of the village, it would be possible to proceed onward [unhindered] over the Bayt Ha-Elah road northward (sic)."

=== Fall of Allar ===
The people of the neighboring Arab village, Allar (site of the present-day Moshav Mata), upon hearing the sound of gunfire from the direction of Dayr al-Hawa, were gripped with fear and trepidation. When they were told that some of the residents in Dayr al-Hawa had been killed, out of concern for their own safety, the villagers took flight, taking with them provisions and bedding material for their needs, and the last of that summer's harvest from their fields (wheat and lentils), fleeing by lorry to al-Khader, whence they found temporary shelter in caves around Bayt Jala, before eventually settling in Dheisheh Camp.

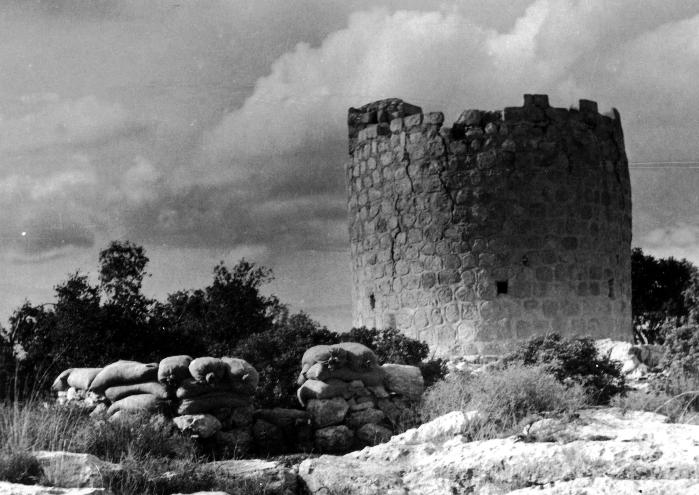
Harel position near ruin, southeast of Beit Jimal

=== Fall of Beit Jimal ===
Afterwards, on 20 October, a much smaller force from the Fifth Battalion broke-away and travelled with a battle corps of the 10th Armored Brigade on the Bayt Jibrin highway and captured Beit Jimal. Having taken that strategic location and having silenced the Egyptian cannon fire that dominated the Bayt Jibrin highway, this enabled troops from the Givati infantry brigade, known as Shu'alei Shimshon , to proceed unhindered unto Bayt Jibrin.

=== Fall of Bayt Nattif and Zakariyya ===
The following day (21 October), Moshe ("Morris") Ben-Dror, the commander of the Fifth Battalion, put together a battle corps consisting of two companies of riflemen, a support company and saboteurs, who were instructed to take Bayt Nattif and to destroy its houses, whose inhabitants had fought against the Convoy of thirty-five fallen soldiers who were sent to aid their beleaguered comrades in Gush Etzion. Many of the town's inhabitants had taken up refuge in nearby Umm al-Ra'us, but were prevented from returning. At night, a unit from the Fifth Battalion raided the village of Zakariyya (site of the present-day Zekharia), which action them opened the Elah Valley road to al-Khader (today, regional highway 375). Many of the villagers in Zakariyya had fled to the hills, but returned to live in their village and were allowed to stay there, until they were eventually resettled in 1950, with compensation, some in Ramlah, while others choosing to move to Jordan.

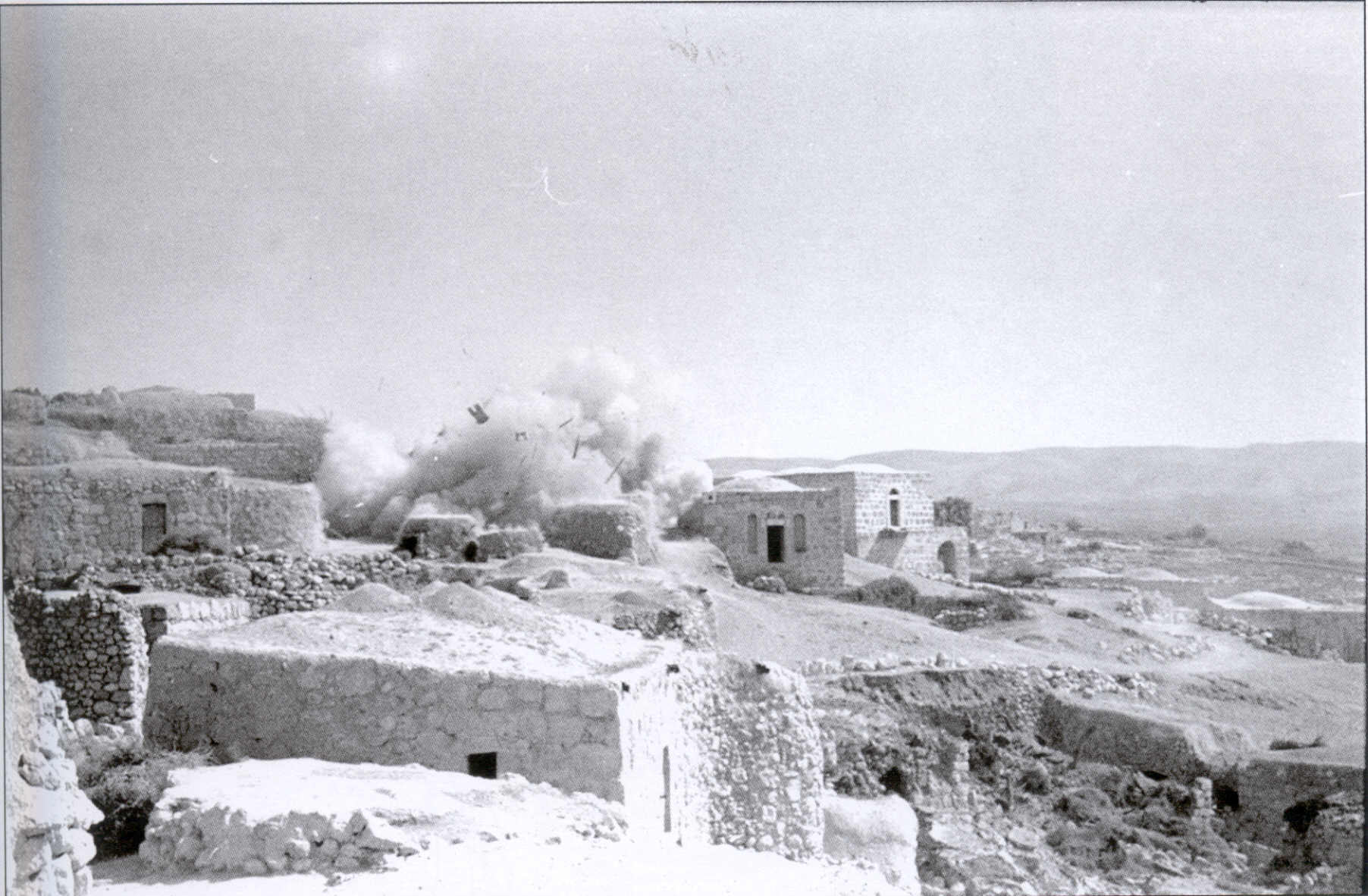
Demolition of houses in Bayt Nattif, the Har'el Brigade, 1948

=== Fall of Jarash and Bayt 'Itab ===
With war approaching, by the 21st of October, the residents of Jarash had fled their hilltop village. An integrated force of armored vehicles and infantry proceeded on the road (now route 386) in the direction of Bayt 'Itab (near the present site of Bar Giora). Before the break of dawn (22nd of October), it became evident to the fighting force that the town's inhabitants had all deserted the village. The houses of the villages were demolished, and when the land mines along the route had been dismantled and cleared for safe passage, the entire force continued to move until it reached the intersection near the Arab village of Ḥousan. There, a firefight broke-out between Jordanian infantry accompanied with armored cars carrying cannons and the advance guard of the Har’el. At length, the Jordanian forces retreated, and by dusk, the Har’el Brigade entered the village Ḥousan.

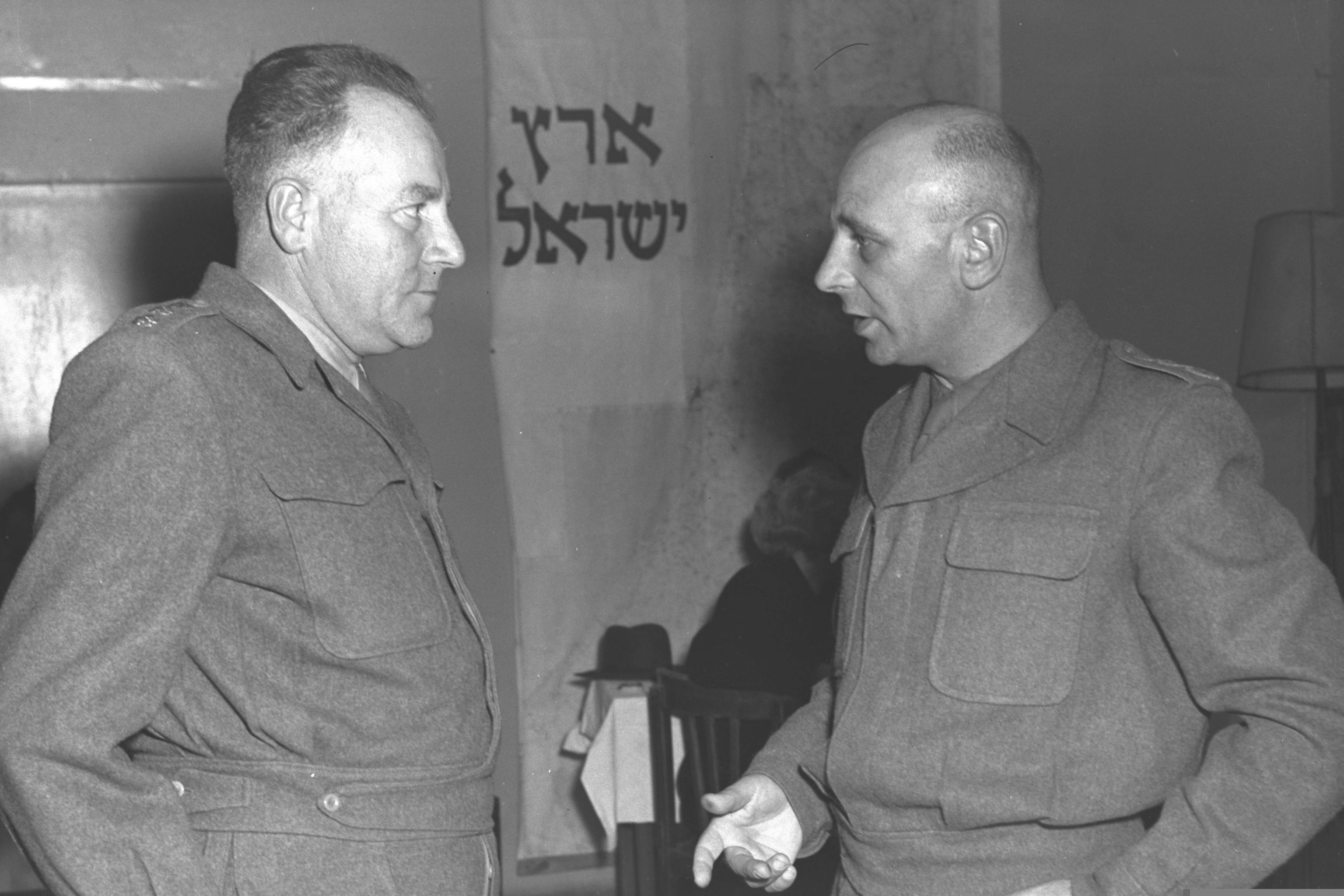
Zvi Ayalon (right) and Joseph Avidar

On 22 October, at 15:30 hours, at the request of the United Nations Security Council, a cease-fire took effect, in which both sides agreed. One hour later, the Har’el Brigade received instructions to withdraw from the village, which news caught them by surprise, and to return to the intersection, and there to wait for further orders. The troops were then withdrawn and were positioned along the valley of Wadi Fukin, in accordance with the cease-fire agreement. Even so, the fighters of the Fifth Battalion made themselves ready for continued action. The general feeling among the troops was that they were fully capable of taking the entire area between Bethlehem and Hebron, based on military intelligence of enemy troops in the region. However, by midnight, Prime-Minister David Ben-Gurion had instructed the Har’el Brigade to withdraw all forces, meaning, Israeli forces were to relinquish their grip on Ḥousan. OC Central Command, General Zvi Ayalon, passed these instructions to Joseph Tabenkin, demanding that all hostilities end immediately, and that they return to the "Forked Junction" (today, Tzur Hadassah), 4-6 kilometers from Bayt Jala and 6.2 miles (10 km) from Bethlehem. Tabenkin, the Brigade commander, being startled by the order, went urgently that night to Har’el HQ in Abu-Ghosh and tried to convince his commanders to reexamine their decision and to continue with the prosecution of the war, but to no avail.

The result of the campaign to expand the Jerusalem Corridor as far as the western foothills of the Judean mountains, freeing it from pockets of resistance, helped, in the final analysis, to determine the border of Israel with Jordan during the 1949 Armistice Agreement.
