= Allar =

Allar may refer to:

- Allar language
- Allar, Jalilabad, Azerbaijan
- Allar, Yardymli, Azerbaijan
- Allar, Jerusalem, a Palestinian village depopulated in 1948

== People with the given name ==
- Allar (given name)

== People with the surname ==
- Erica Allar (born 1985), American cyclist
- Drew Allar (born 2004) American football player
