= Khirbat al-Tannur =

Khirbat al-Tannur خربة التنور
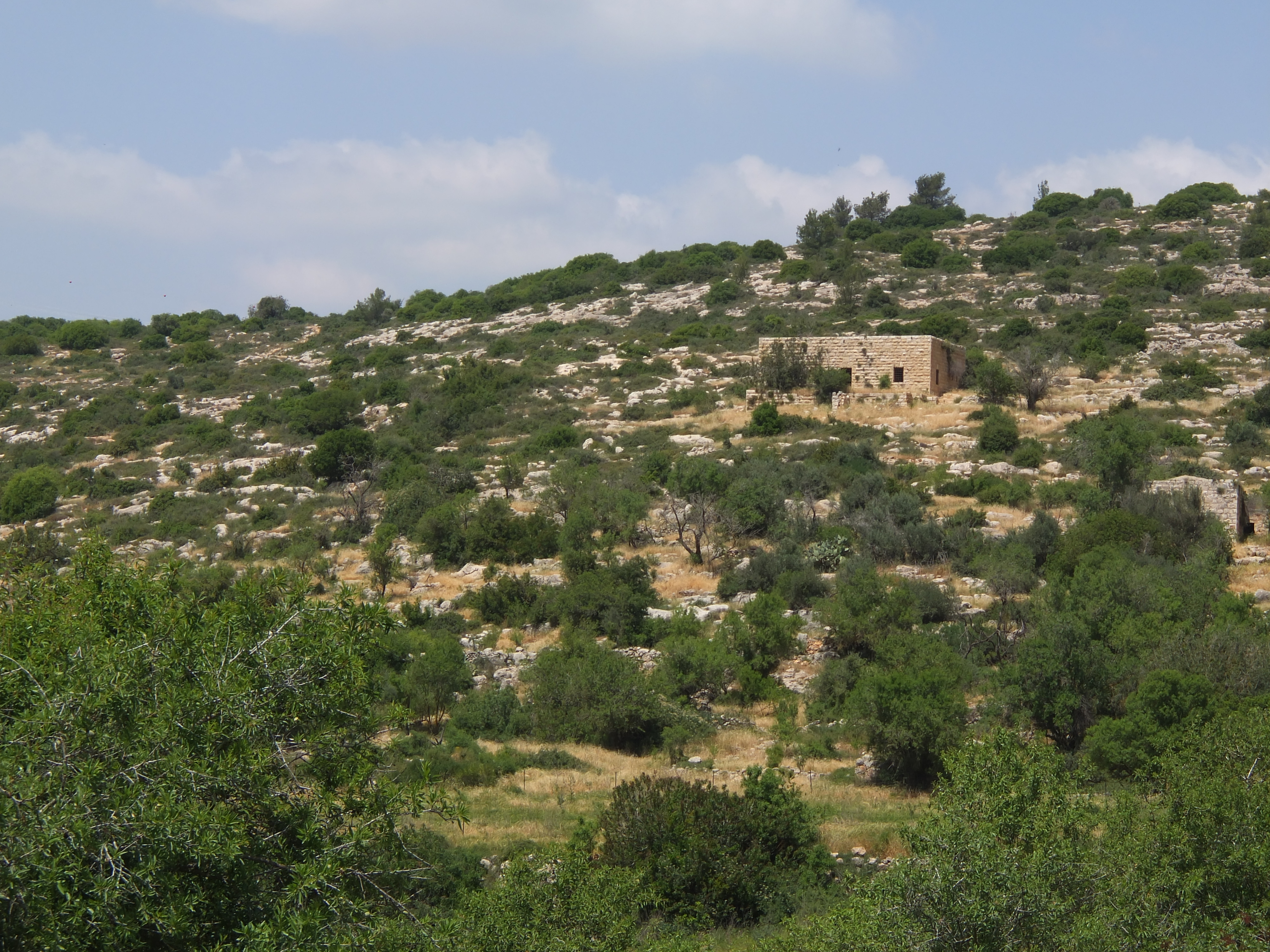
- Etymology: "The lower Allar"
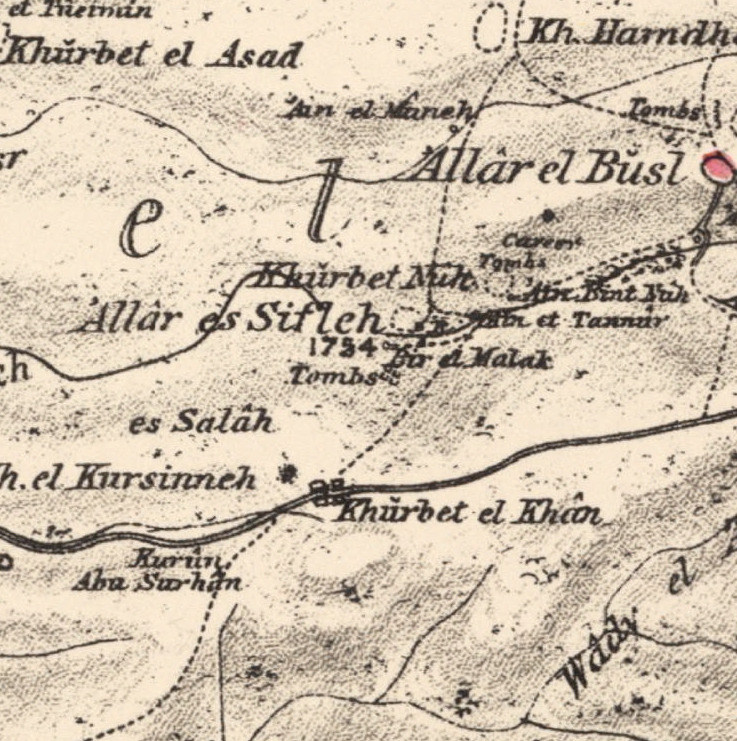
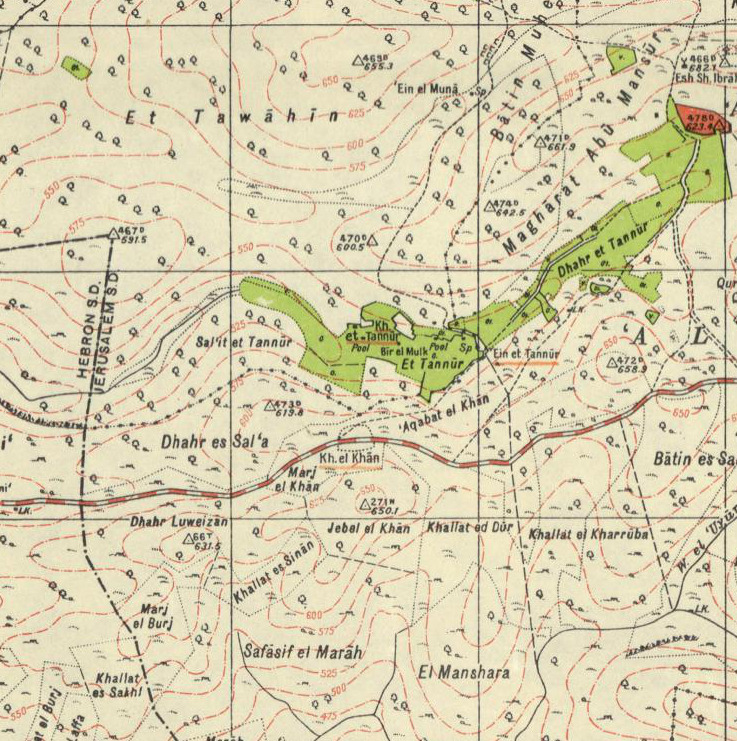
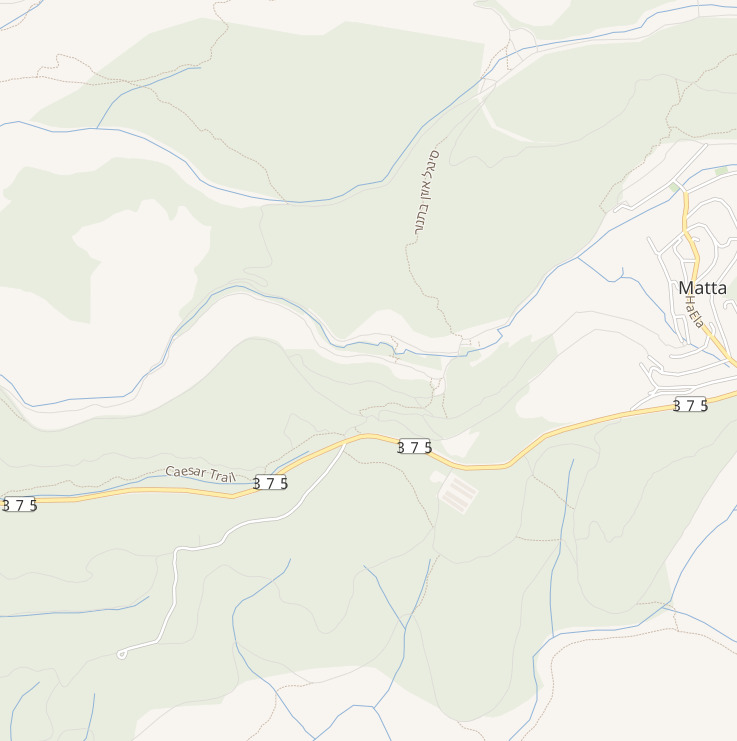
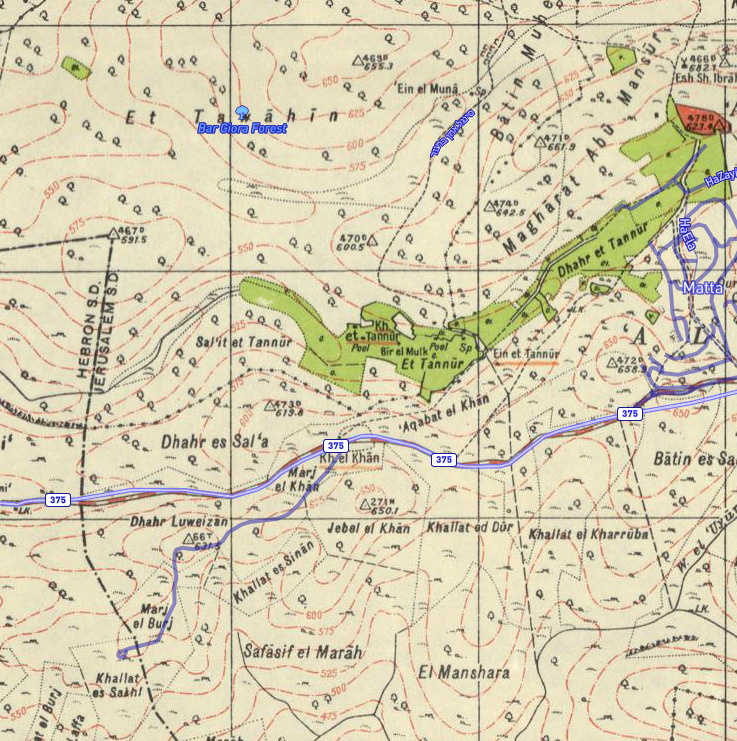
- 1870s map 1940s map modern map 1940s with modern overlay map A series of historical maps of the area around Khirbat al-Tannur (click the buttons)

- Location within Mandatory Palestine
- Coordinates: 31°42′54″N 35°02′55″E
- Palestine grid: 154/124
- Geopolitical entity: Mandatory Palestine
- Subdistrict: Jerusalem
- Date of depopulation: October 21, 1948

Population (19th century)
  - Total: 400
- Current Localities: Mata

Khirbat al-Tannur (Arabic: خربة التنور), also known as Allar al-Sifla ("Lower Allar"), was a Palestinian Arab hamlet in the Jerusalem Subdistrict, near Allar. It was depopulated during the 1948 Arab–Israeli War on October 21, 1948, under Operation Ha-Har. It was located 18.5 km west of Jerusalem.

== History ==
Ein Tanur ("Oven Spring") is a spring north east of the village site, enhanced by an ancient tunnel dug deeply to catch the water at the source and increase its flow. The name was in the 19th century Ain Bint Nûh, or the spring of Noah’s daughter.

In the 12th century, during the Crusader era, a rural monastery was established consisting of several barrel-vaulted buildings, an enclosure wall and a chapel. British archaeologist Denys Pringle proposed that the complex was a known Cistercian house called "Saluatio" established in 1169.

In the 13th century it was recorded in two documents that income from the village supported the school al-Mu'azzamiyya (com.) ("مدارس"), north of the Haram Ash-Sharif in Jerusalem.

=== Ottoman era ===
Khirbat al-Tannur was incorporated into the Ottoman Empire in 1517 with all of Palestine, and in 1596 it appeared in the tax registers under the name of 'Allar as-Sufla in the Nahiya of Quds in the Liwa of Quds ("القدس"), with a population of 7 Muslim households. They paid a fixed tax-rate of 33,3 % on wheat, barley, summer crops and olives, a total of 3,150 Akçe. All of the revenue went to a Waqf.

In 1838, Edward Robinson noted that: "we came to a village called Allar es-Sifla (the lower), to distinguish it from a village called Allar el-Foka (the upper), on a higher ground a little further to the left. Here was a ruined church, large and solidly built, and apparently very ancient. A few rods on the left, higher up the valley, is a fine fountain, which waters a tract of gardens and fruit trees along the bottom. Here are also many olive trees; which indeed are very abundant throughout all this region. "

Victor Guérin, who visited in 1863, noted the presence of a large, ancient, ruined church.

In 1873, the PEF's Survey of Western Palestine visited and described the ruins at 'Allar es Sifleh: "Apparently an ancient site with rock- cut tombs. Khurbet Nuh forms part of the site with its two springs and gardens of orange trees. There is a ruined building here, which appears to have been an ancient church. The building has a bearing 107° east along its length, with a window to the east and two to the north. On the south was the door. The measurements outside were 88 feet east and west by 46 feet north and south. The walls are 10 feet thick, and standing in parts 20 feet high. A cornice runs round the interior two brackets remain on the north wall between the windows, which probably once supported the arches of the roof. The windows are very narrow, with round arches above. The masonry is of small stones, rudely squared, but the faces not dressed smooth. The mortar is hard and mixed with charcoal. The core of the walls is of rubble. The interior of the church is cemented. All these details point to the building being of 12th century date.

Among the ruins are vaults cemented inside, with small masonry and pointed arches. One corner of a building had drafted stones, the face rustic, and projecting 2 1/2 inches, the draft 4 inches wide. Near this is an old ruined tank. The ruins are probably to be attributed to Crusading times."

French orientalist and archaeologist, Charles Clermont-Ganneau, who visited the site in 1874 described in great detail the ancient church (El K'nîseh) which he saw in Allar al-Sifla, and which partially stands to this very day.

A visitor in 1875 wrote that it had a population of 400, but soon afterwards it was apparently abandoned until the 20th century.

=== British Mandate era ===
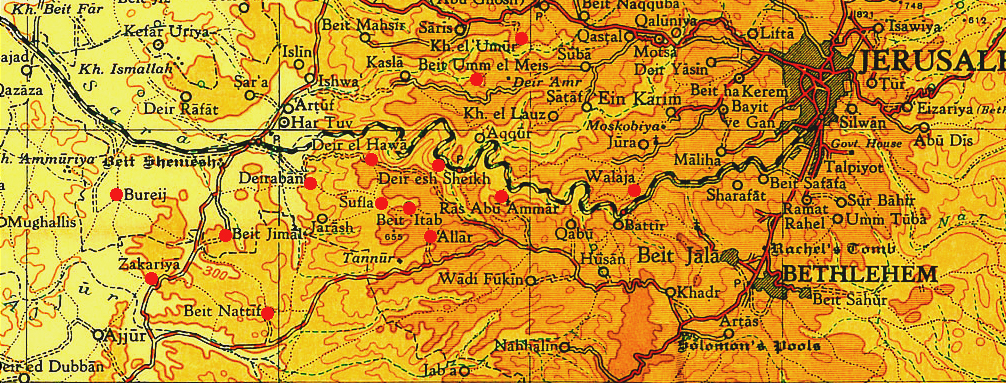

In the late Mandate period it was classified as a hamlet.

Six Arab families from Bayt 'Itab who settled amid the Crusader ruins were involved in a long-standing feud with Allar villagers over water use, land ownership and grazing routes, which only ended in 1948 when both places were depopulated.

=== 1948 and aftermath ===
When the site was inspected in 1992, there were ten houses of which six had been destroyed. The village land was amalgamated with that of Allar, and the settlement closest to Khirbat al-Tannur was MataAccording to the legend as recounted by the mukhtar of Alar, Noah’s oven stood here before the flood: "When God despaired of His creations and destroyed the world, the righteous Noah’s oven began spouting water, thus proving Noah’s great commitment to God. By the time the deluge was over...the oven had forgotten its original purpose. Thus, today, water continues to flow at this site, as if the flood had never ended." The mukhtar explained that Noah passed by this spot in his ark but saw only a spring rather than his oven, which is why he chose to continue his journey and land on Mount Ararat.

== Gallery ==
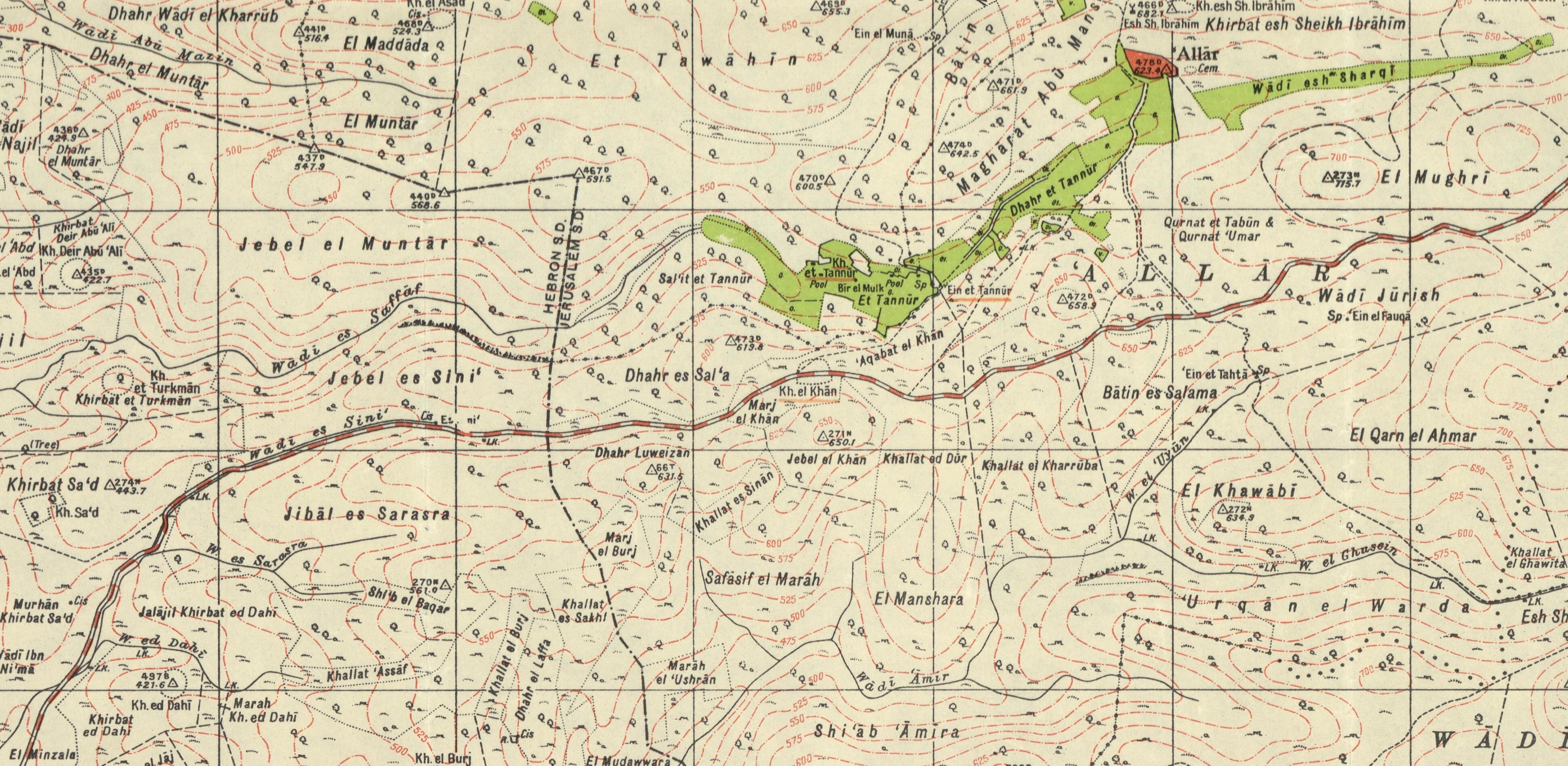
Khirbet et-Tannur, Mandate survey, 1:20,000

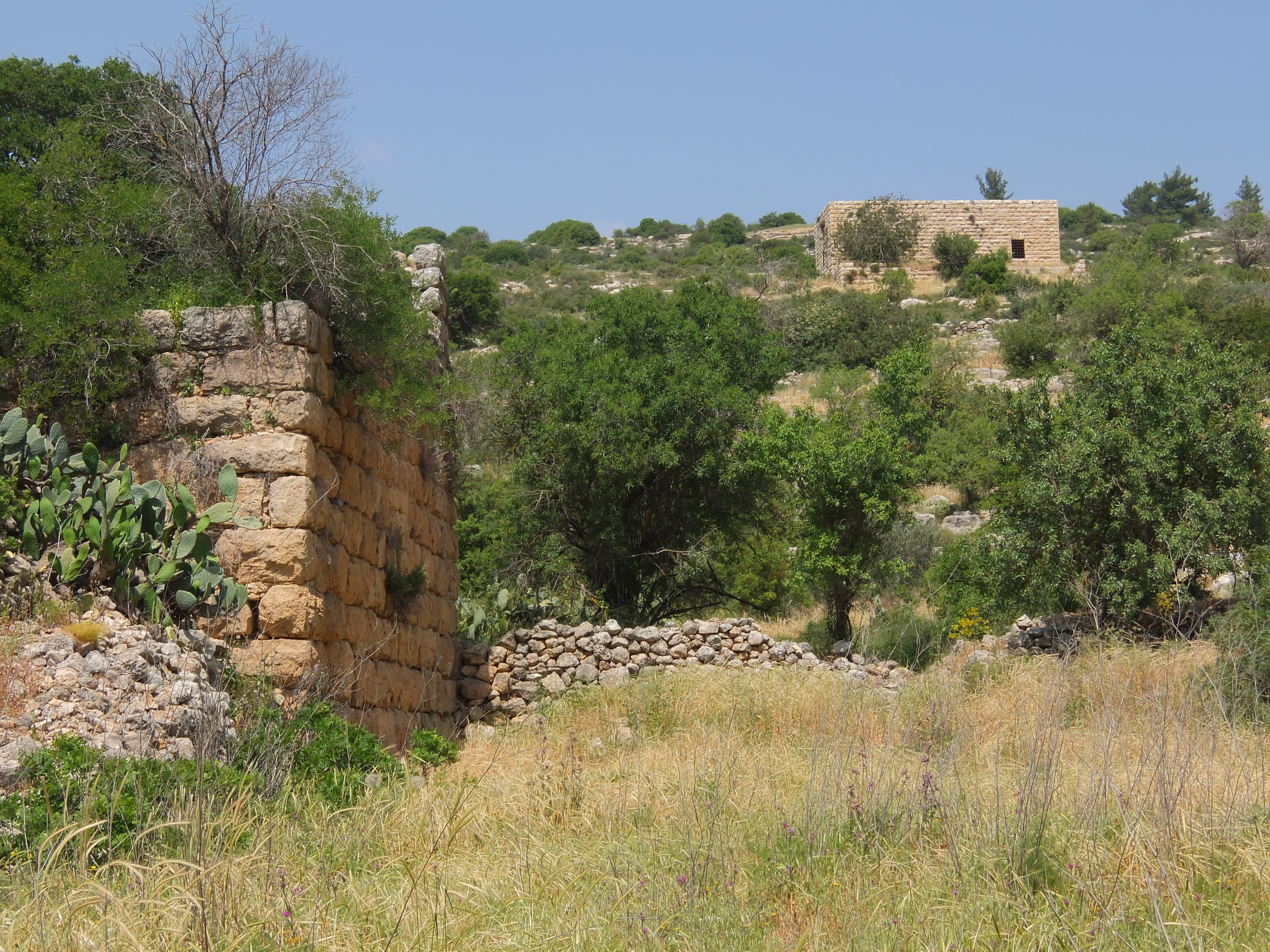
Old structures in Allar es-Sifleh

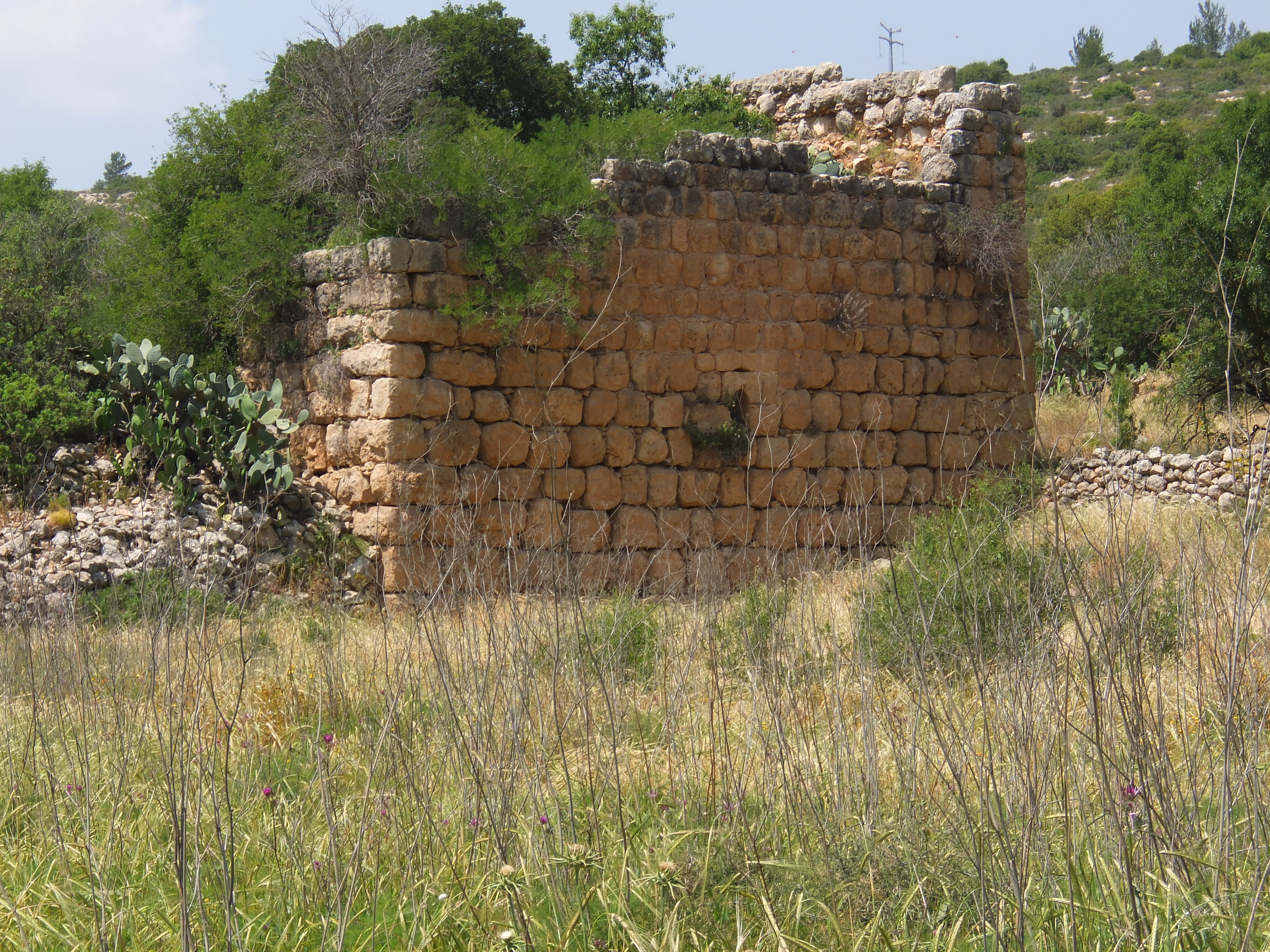
Ruins of a church in Allar es-Sifleh

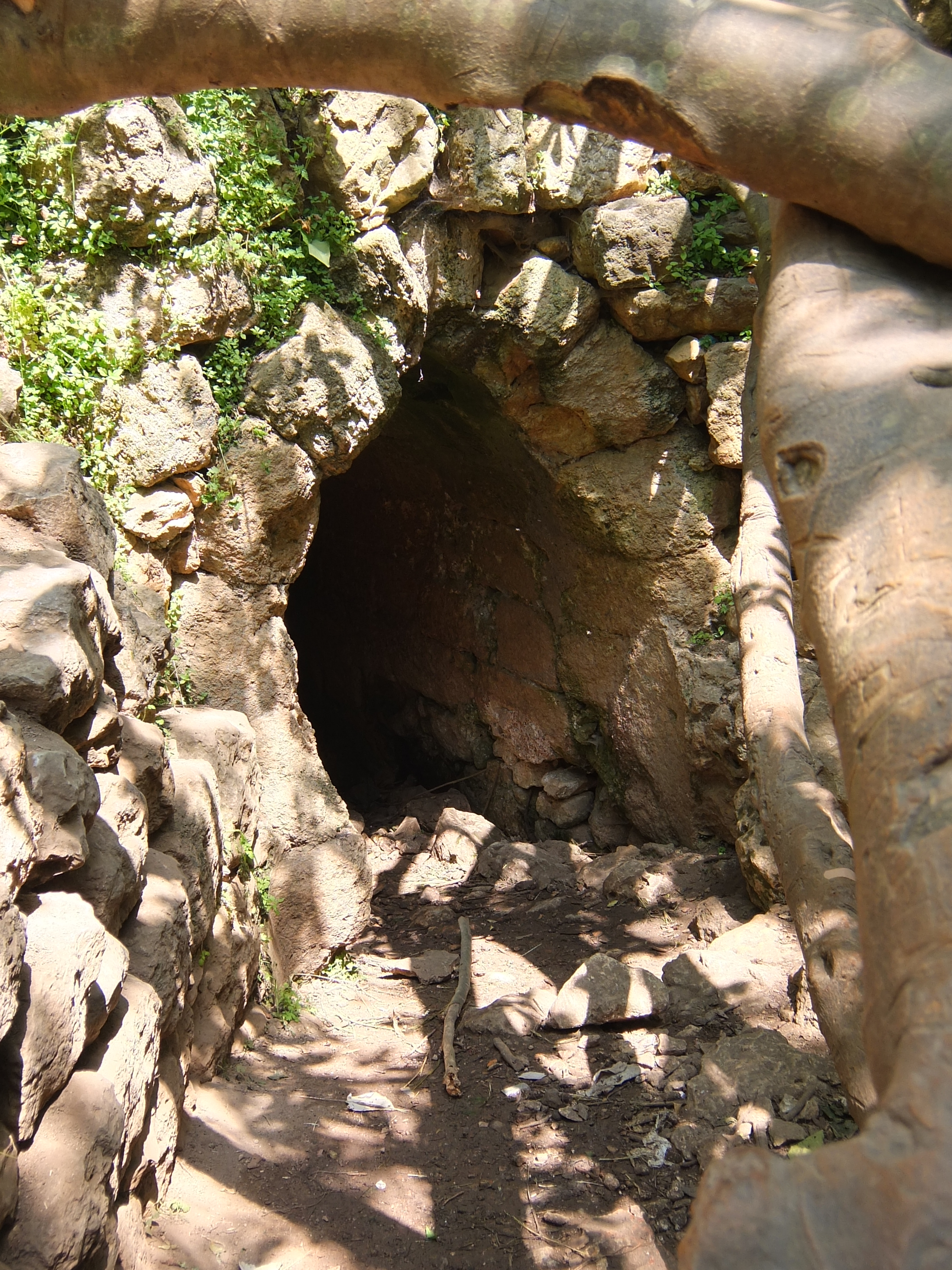
Entrance to ancient water conduit known as ʻAin Bint Nuh

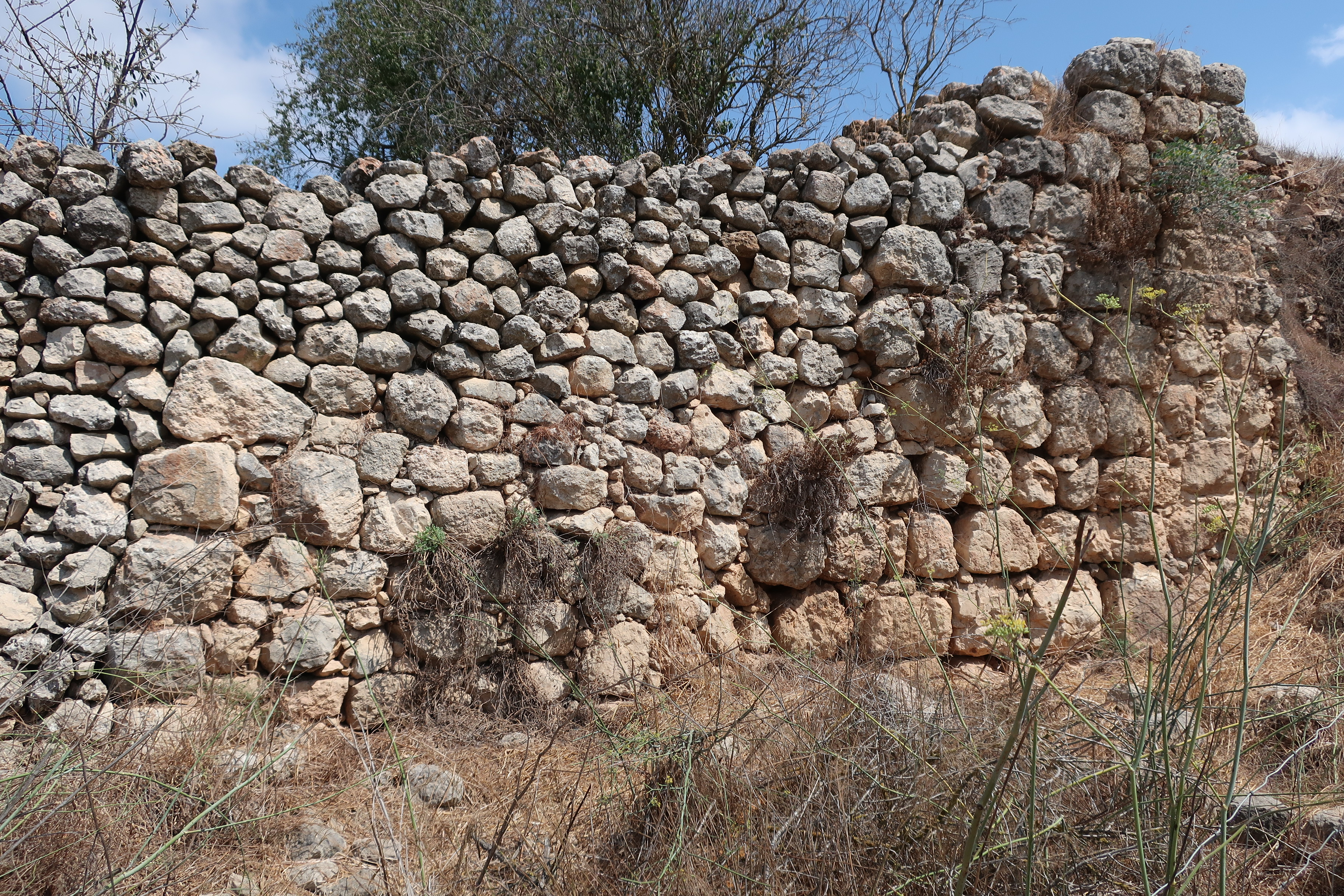
Stone wall in Khirbat al-Tannur

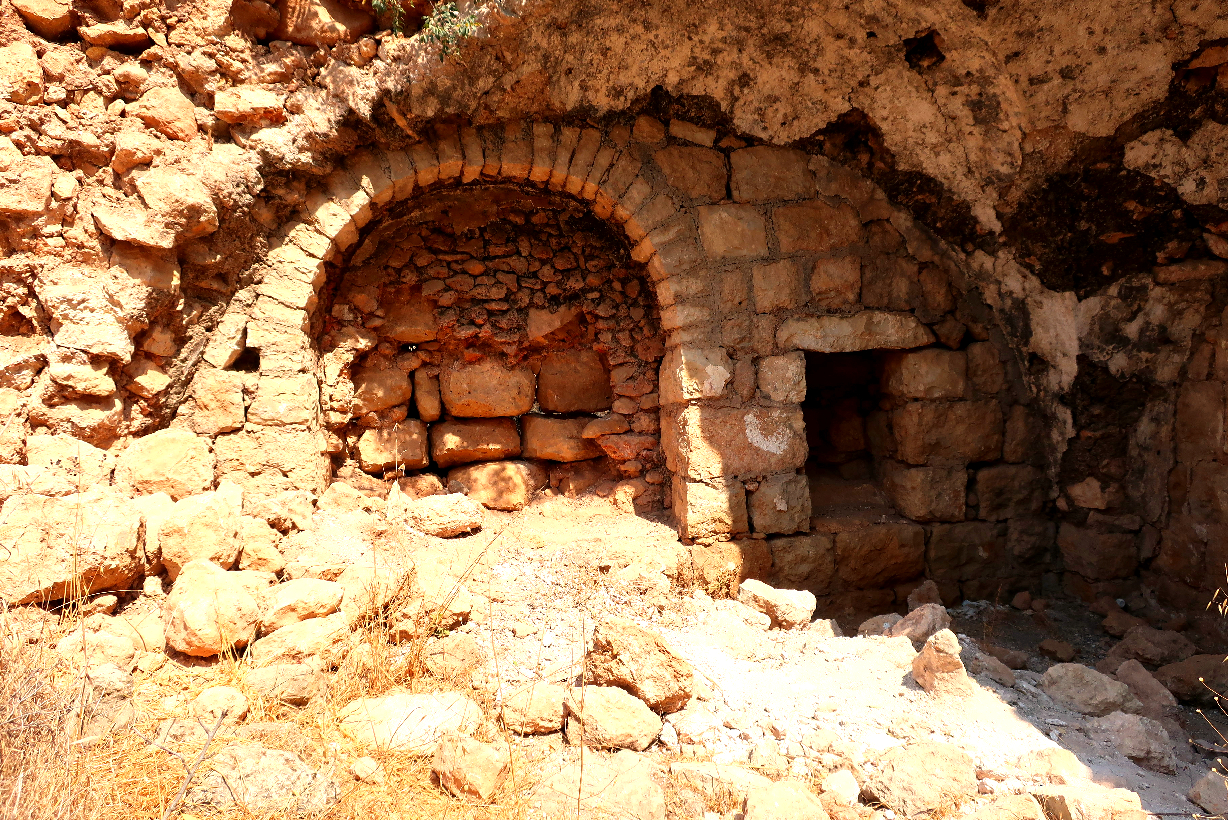
Ruins at Khirbat al-Tannur

== Bibliography ==
- Clermont-Ganneau, C.S. (1896). [ARP] Archaeological Researches in Palestine 1873-1874, translated from the French by J. McFarlane. Vol. 2. London: Palestine Exploration Fund.
- Conder, C.R.; Kitchener, H.H. (1883). The Survey of Western Palestine: Memoirs of the Topography, Orography, Hydrography, and Archaeology. Vol. 3. London: Committee of the Palestine Exploration Fund.
- Guérin, V. (1869). Description Géographique Historique et Archéologique de la Palestine (in French). Vol. 1: Judee, pt. 2. Paris: L'Imprimerie Nationale.
- Hawari, M. (2007). Ayyubid Jerusalem (1187-1250): an architectural and archaeological study (Illustrated ed.). Archaeopress. ISBN 9781407300429.
- Hütteroth, W.-D.; Abdulfattah, K. (1977). Historical Geography of Palestine, Transjordan and Southern Syria in the Late 16th Century. Erlanger Geographische Arbeiten, Sonderband 5. Erlangen, Germany: Vorstand der Fränkischen Geographischen Gesellschaft. ISBN 3-920405-41-2.
- Khalidi, W. (1992). All That Remains: The Palestinian Villages Occupied and Depopulated by Israel in 1948. Washington D.C.: Institute for Palestine Studies. ISBN 0-88728-224-5.
- Morris, B. (2004). The Birth of the Palestinian Refugee Problem Revisited. Cambridge University Press. ISBN 978-0-521-00967-6.
- Palmer, E.H. (1881). The Survey of Western Palestine: Arabic and English Name Lists Collected During the Survey by Lieutenants Conder and Kitchener, R. E. Transliterated and Explained by E.H. Palmer. Committee of the Palestine Exploration Fund.
- Petersen, Andrew (2001). A Gazetteer of Buildings in Muslim Palestine (British Academy Monographs in Archaeology). Vol. 1. Oxford University Press. ISBN 978-0-19-727011-0. Archived from the original on 2021-05-29.
- Pringle, D. (1993). The Churches of the Crusader Kingdom of Jerusalem: A-K (excluding Acre and Jerusalem). Cambridge University Press. ISBN 9780521390361.
- Robinson, E.; Smith, E. (1841). Biblical Researches in Palestine, Mount Sinai and Arabia Petraea: A Journal of Travels in the year 1838. Vol. 2. Boston: Crocker & Brewster.
