= Alla =

Alla may refer to:

- Ara Gaya, also called Alla (안라), a city-state kingdom in the part of Gaya confederacy, in modern-day Haman County of Korea

== Music ==
- "Alla" (song) a song by Swedish singer Sofia
- Allá, a rock band from Chicago
- At.Long.Last.A$AP, an album by American rapper A$AP Rocky

== People ==
- Alla (female name), a Slavic female given name
- Alla (surname), a surname

== Places ==
- Alla, Bhutan
- Alla, California, a.k.a. Alla Station or Alla Junction
- Alla, Iran, a village in Semnan Province, Iran

== See also ==
- Alla, the Maltese term for "God"
- Allah (الله), the Arabic term for "God"
