= Allas =

Allas is a surname. Notable people with the surname include:

- Anti Allas (born 1977), Estonian politician
- Jovna Allas (born 1950), Swedish politician
- Teet Allas (born 1977), Estonian footballer
- Yasmine Allas (born 1967), Somali-Dutch actress and writer

== See also ==
- Alla (surname)
- Allas Sea Pool
- Hallas
