= God is great =

God is Great may refer to:

- The Takbir, the Arabic phrase "Allāhu Akbar", often translated as "God is Great"
- God Is Great and I'm Not (Dieu est grand, je suis toute petite), a 2001 French film
- God is Great (no. 2), a 1991 sculpture by John Latham

== See also ==
- God Is Not Great, a 2007 book by Christopher Hitchens
- Allahu Akbar (disambiguation)
- God Is Good (disambiguation)
