= Allahu Akbar (disambiguation) =

Allahu Akbar (Arabic: الله أكبر) is an Arabic phrase, called Takbir, meaning "God is greater" or "God is [the] greatest".

Allahu Akbar or Allahu Ekber and similar variants may also refer to:

- Allahu Akbar (anthem), the national anthem of Libya from 1969 to 2011
- Allahu Akbar (1959 film), an Egyptian love story film set in the dawn of Islam
- Allahu Akbar (1977 film), an Indian Malayalam film
- "Allahu Akbar" (Lounès Matoub song), a song written by Lounès Matoub
- Allahüekber Dağları, a range of mountains in northeast Turkey, formerly on the border between Turkey and Russia
- Allah-o Akbar Rural District, an administrative subdivision of Iran
- "Allah U Akbar", a song by Brand Nubian from their 1993 album In God We Trust

== See also ==
- God is great (disambiguation)
- Allah (disambiguation)
- Akbar (disambiguation)
