= Alla (surname) =

Alla is an Arab and Telugu surname. Notable people with the surname include:

- Albi Alla (born 1993), Albanian footballer
- Hassane Alla (born 1980), Moroccan footballer
- Alla Kali Krishna Das, Indian politician
- Myslym Alla (1919–1999), Albanian footballer and manager
- Alla Ramakrishna Reddy, Indian politician

== See also ==
- Allas
