= Allah, Arizona =

- Populated place
- Location of Allah in Arizona
- Coordinates: 33°55′41″N 112°41′27″W
- Country: United States
- State: Arizona
- County: Maricopa
- Elevation: 1,955 ft (596 m)
- Time zone: UTC-7 (Mountain (MST))
  - Summer (DST): UTC-7 (MST)
- Area code: 928
- FIPS code: 04-01720
- GNIS feature ID: 24301

Allah is a populated place located in Maricopa County, Arizona.

== Geography ==
Allah has an estimated elevation of 1,955 feet (596 m) above sea level.

== History ==
It was originally called "Brill's Ranch", but the name was changed due to its resemblance to a fictional desert in a novel, The Garden of Allah. That name has since been shortened to its current form. Garden of Allah was founded as a resort in 1913 by John Sanger, who bought the Brill Ranch. The resort has been called "likely the first dude ranch in Arizona".

The YMCA opened a summer camp at the site in 1918. A post office operated briefly, from 1917 to 1919. Frances Sanger served as postmaster.

Allah's population was 100 in the 1960 census.

A rail stop was built to accommodate the area. The ruins of the Allah Railroad Station are still visible.
