= Mata, Israel =

Moshav in central Israel

Mata: מטע (Hebrew)
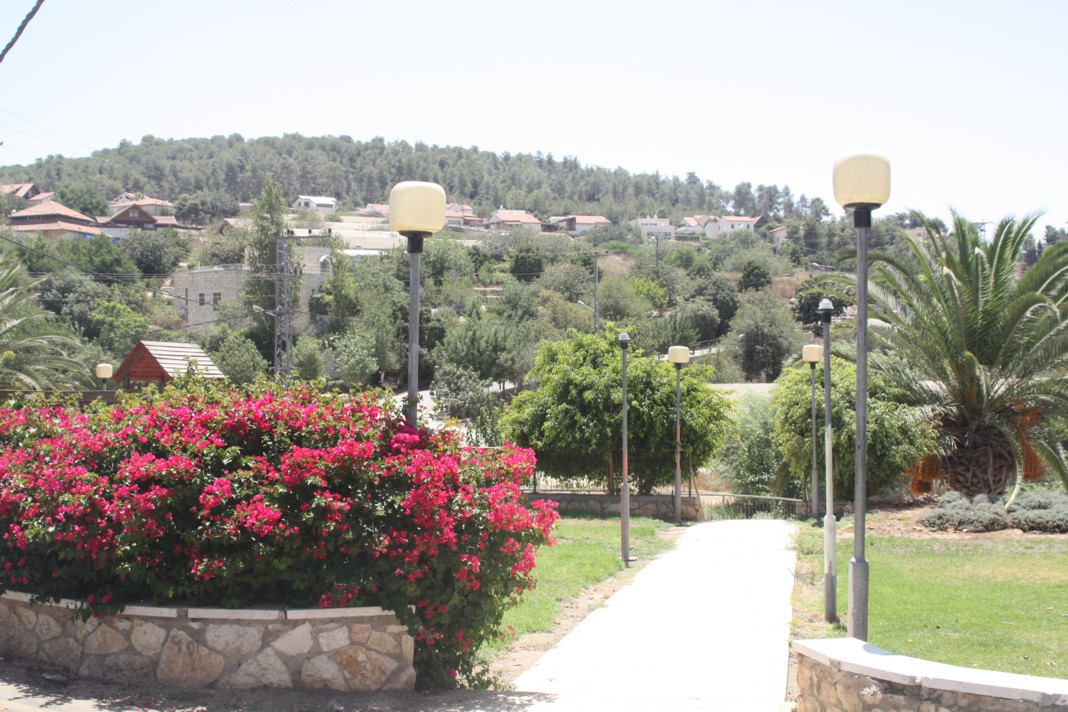

- Location within Jerusalem District
- Coordinates: 31°43′4″N 35°3′44″E
- Country: Israel
- District: Jerusalem
- Council: Mateh Yehuda
- Affiliation: Moshavim Movement
- Founded: 1950
- Founder: Yemenite Jews
- Population (2024): 878

Mata (Hebrew: מַטָּע, lit. 'Grove') is a moshav in central Israel. Located in the Jerusalem corridor about eight kilometers southeast of Beit Shemesh, it falls under the jurisdiction of Mateh Yehuda Regional Council. In 2024 it had a population of 878.

== Etymology ==
"The name mata is also hinted at in Ezekiel (XXXIV, 29)": I will provide for them a grove.

== History ==
The village was established in 1950 by immigrants from Yemen on land that had previously belonged to the depopulated Arab villages of Allar and Khirbat al-Tannur before the 1948 Arab-Israeli War. Initially the moshav fell under the jurisdiction of Elah Regional Council until the council was merged into Mateh Yehuda Regional Council in 1964. The moshav belongs to the Hapoel HaMizrachi stream, but today the majority of its population is secular.

== Archaeology ==
Along the old Roman road (now regional highway 375) are the ruins of a travelers' inn and livery stable, now called "khanut" (formerly, Khirbet el-Khan). A mosaic floor with Greek writing of a Byzantine type can still be seen in the remains of the structure, believed to have been used as a church in the 6th century.

In the 12th century a rural monastery was established there by the Crusaders consisting of several barrel-vaulted buildings, an enclosure wall and a chapel.

Charles Clermont-Ganneau describes the ruins of a church (el-K'niseh), partially standing, in the valley below (Wadi et Tannur), and which he thought to be of medieval origin.

In the valley are various types of trees: Sweet and bitter almonds, olives, grapes, pomegranates, lemons, figs, walnuts, Syrian pears, carobs and hawthorns. To the south-east of the moshav is a natural spring called `Ain Jurish named after a nearby small Arab village (now abandoned) and which was built on the spur of a hill near the town of Tzur Hadassah (Har Kitron). Rock-carved niches used as tombs can still be seen in the abandoned village.

== Landmarks ==
To the west of the moshav is Wadi Tannur, a riverine gulch with two natural springs - Ein Mata (Spring of the Orchard) and Ein Tannur.

At the foot of Ein Tannur ("Oven Spring") is an ancient tunnel dug deeply to catch the water at the source and increase its flow - a spring-flow tunnel. According to a local legend, Noah's oven was located nearby before the flood. When God destroyed the world, Noah's oven began spouting water, proving Noah's great commitment to God. When the flood was over and the water subsided, the oven forgot its original purpose and water continued to flow from it. When Noah passed by in his ark, he only saw the spring rather than his oven, so he continued his journey and finally landed on Mount Ararat.

== Gallery ==
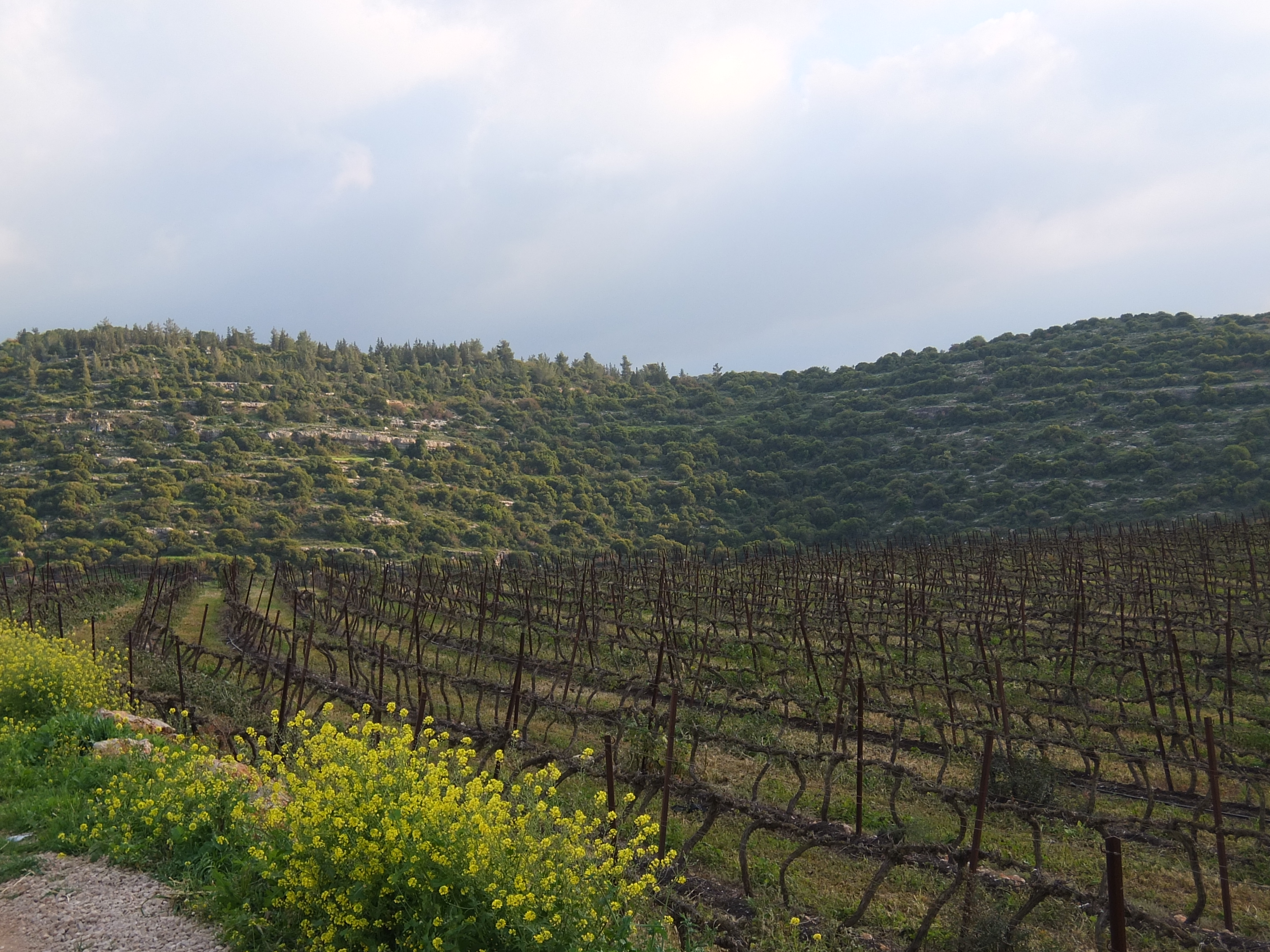
Vineyard in early Spring, southeast of Moshav Mata

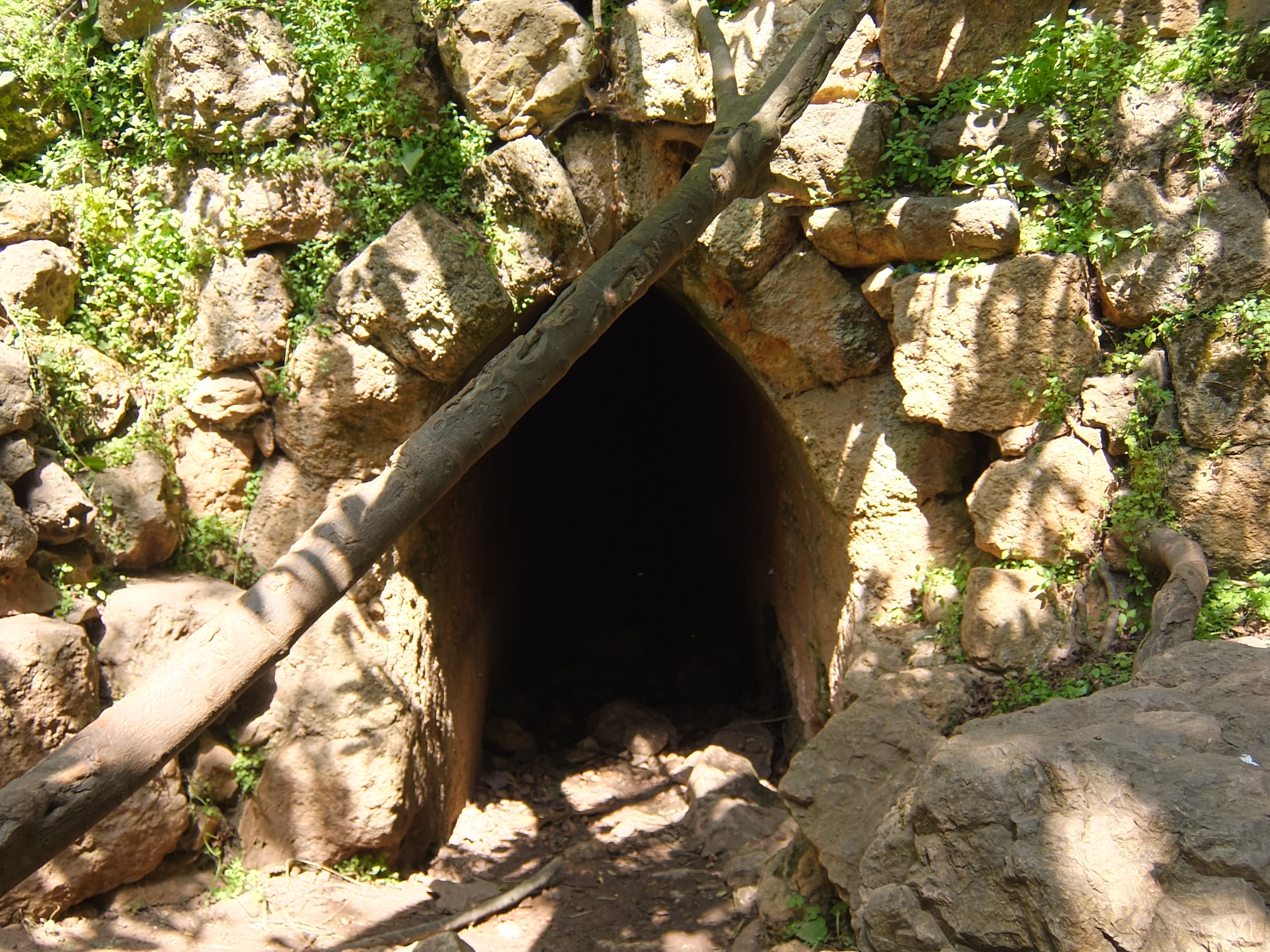
Entrance to natural spring (now dry), Ain et-Tannur, in valley below Mata

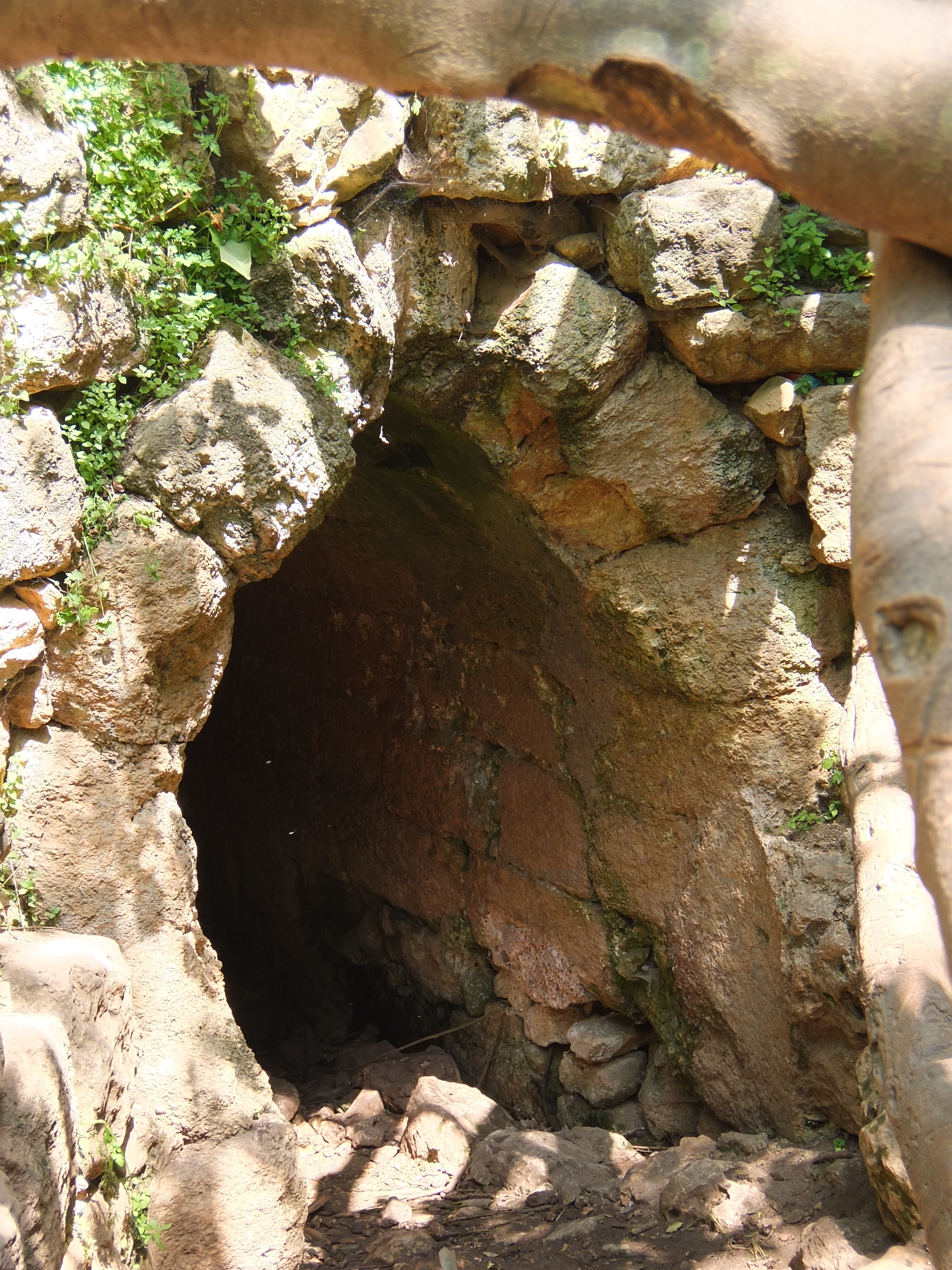
Entrance to tunnel whence flowed a natural spring, now run-dry

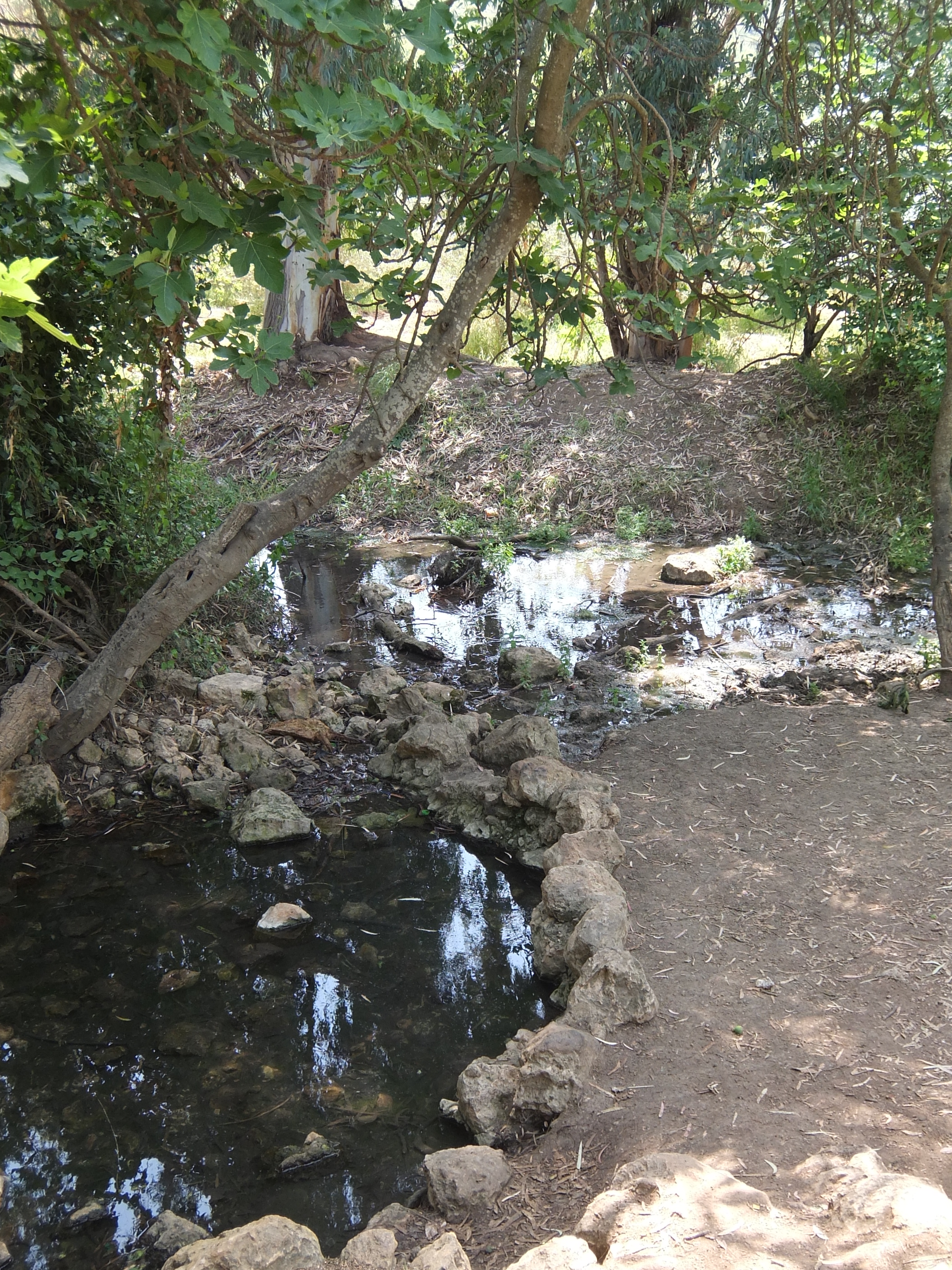
A natural spring near Moshav Mata

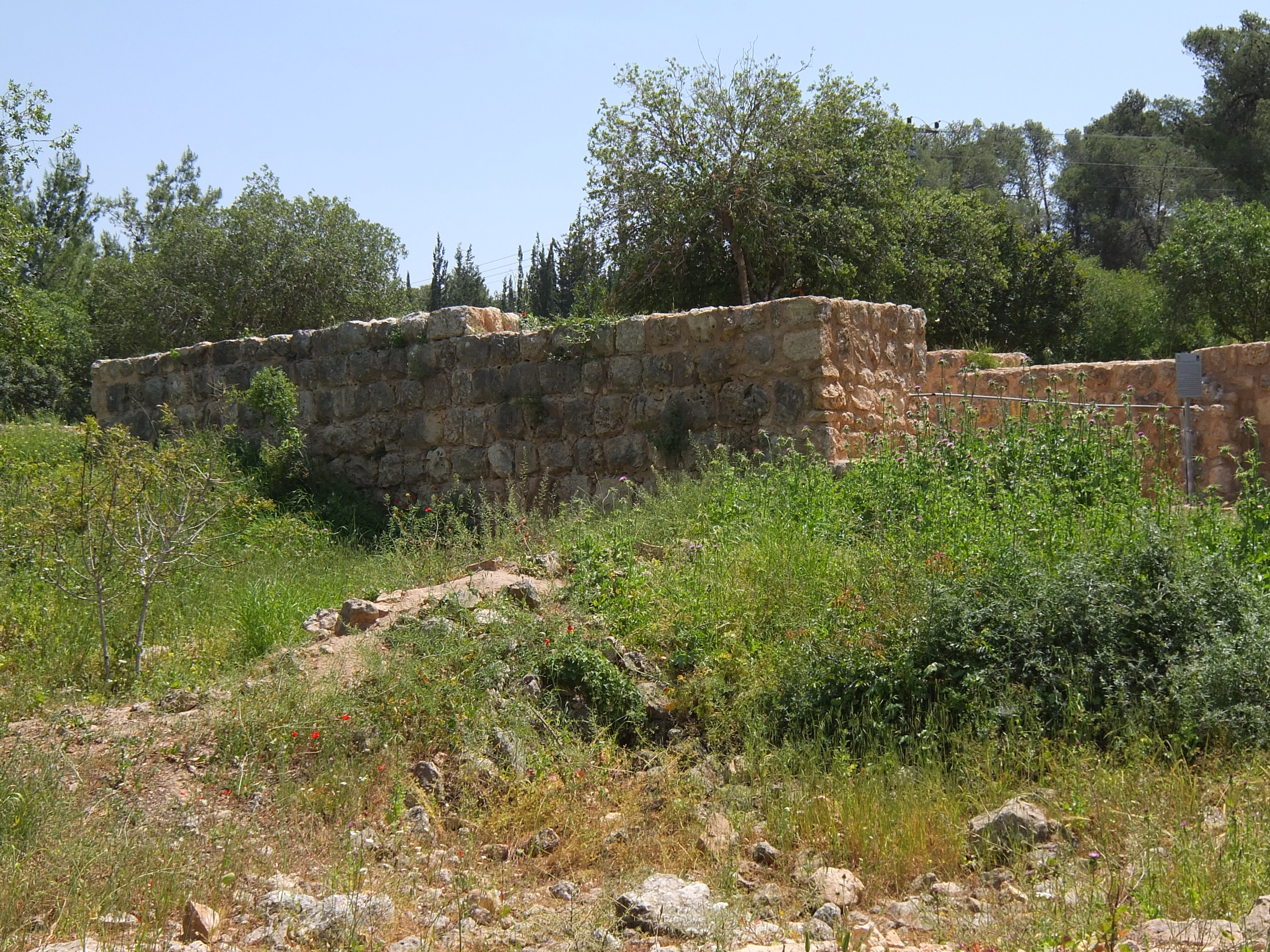
Remains of caravanserai (Khan), formerly used also as a Byzantine church, near Moshav Mata

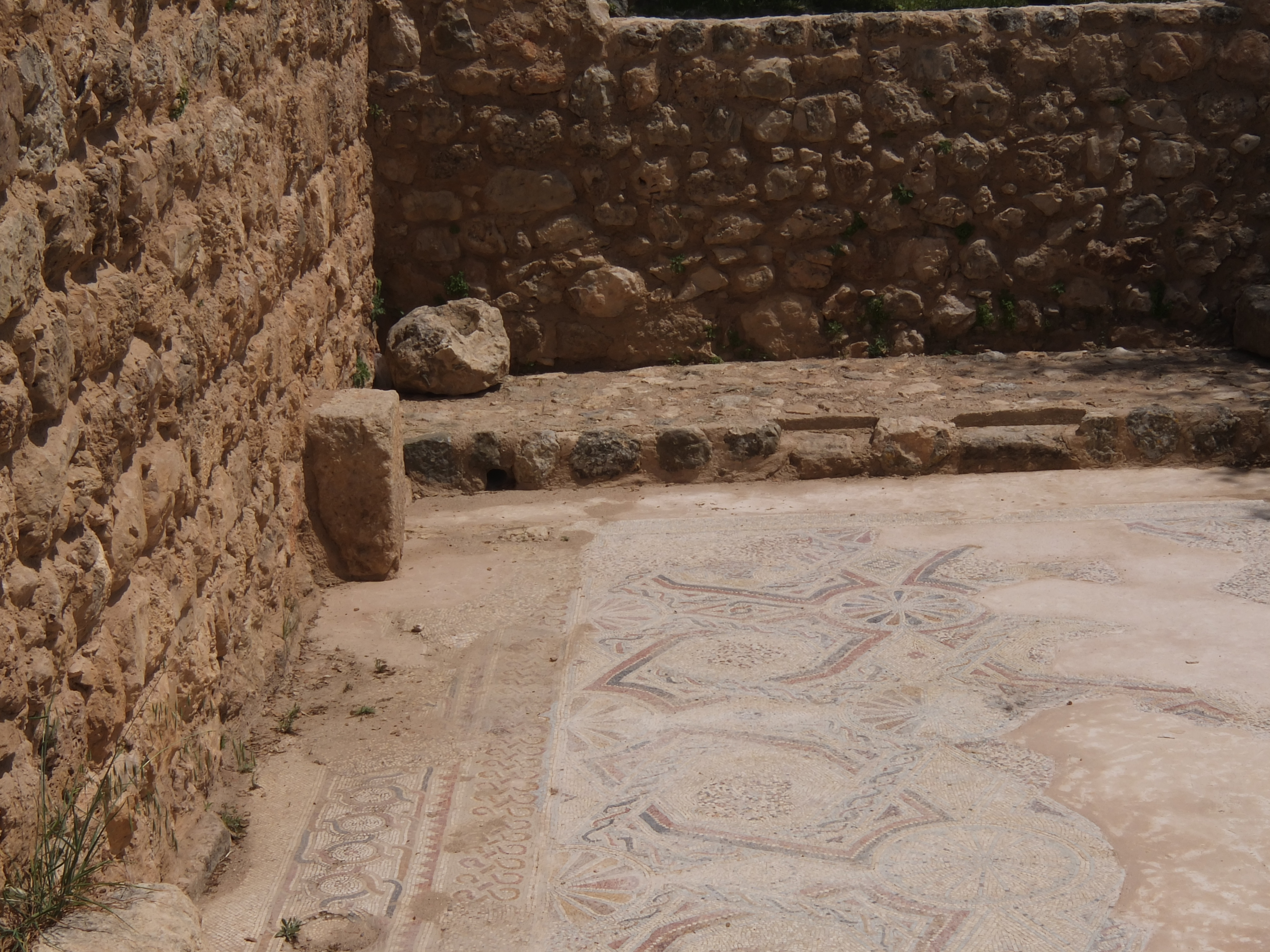
Caravanserai (Khan), used also as a 6th-century Byzantine church, near Mata

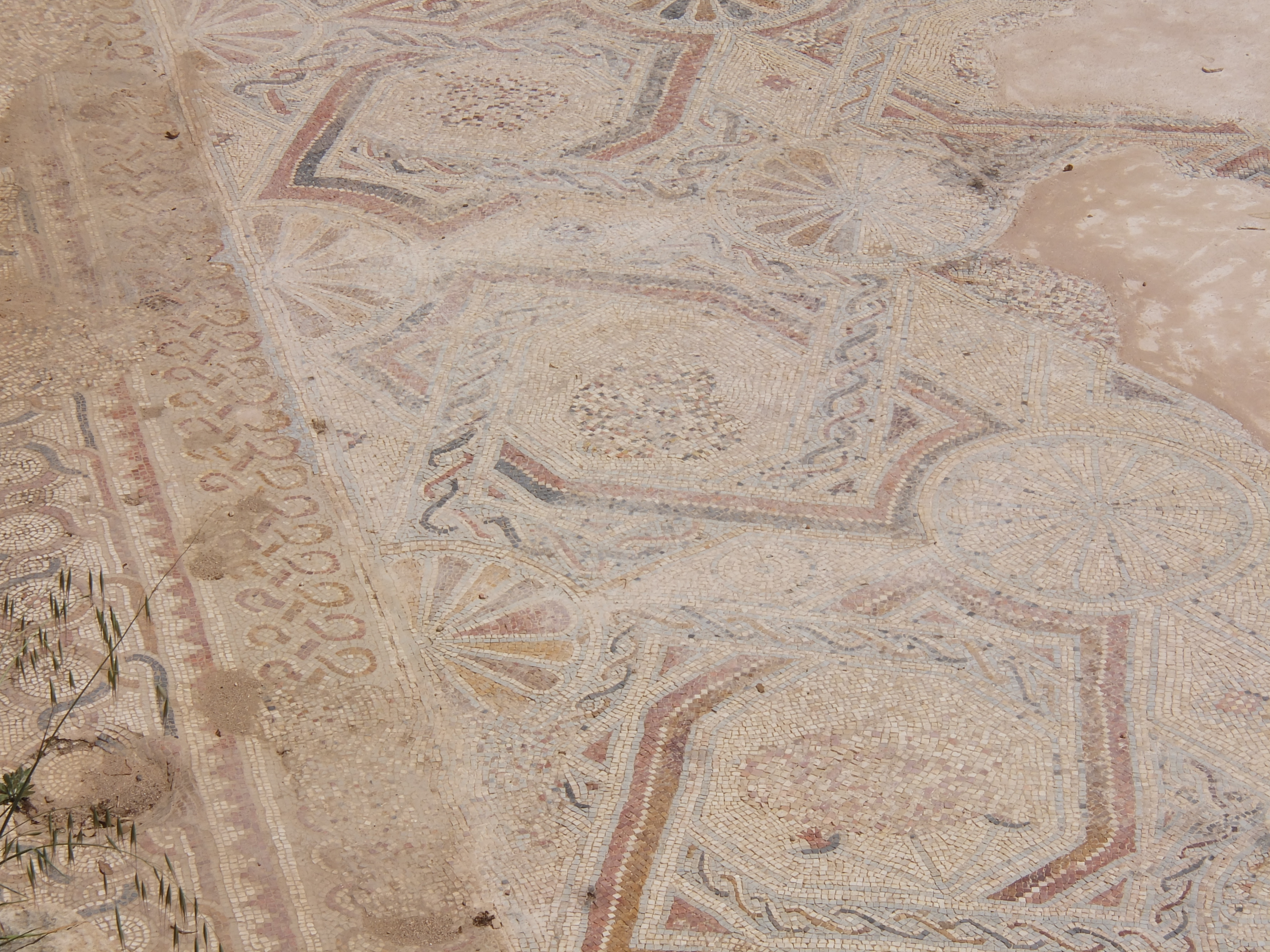
Byzantine mosaic, circa 6th-century CE

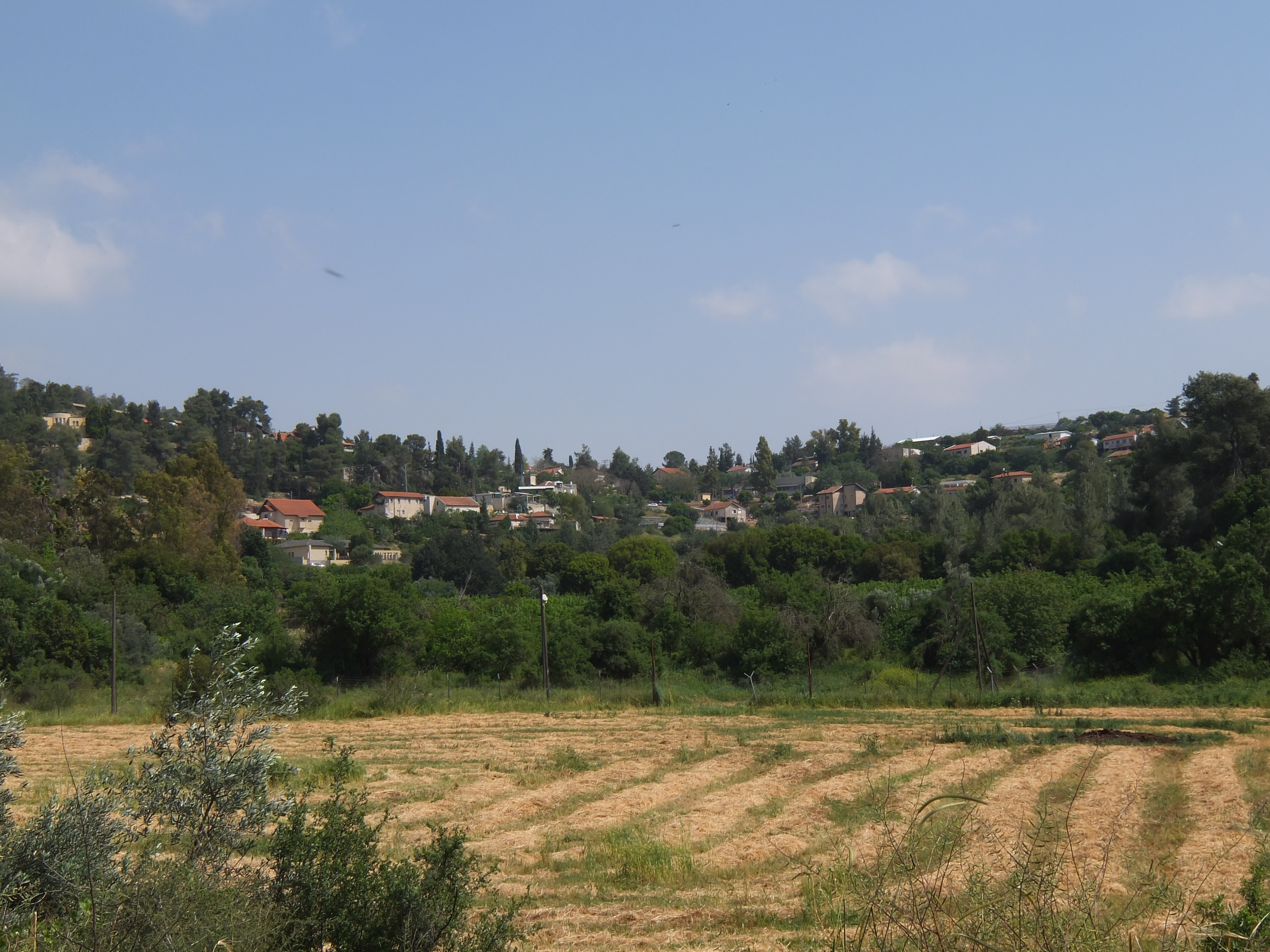
View of Moshav from Wadi Tannur

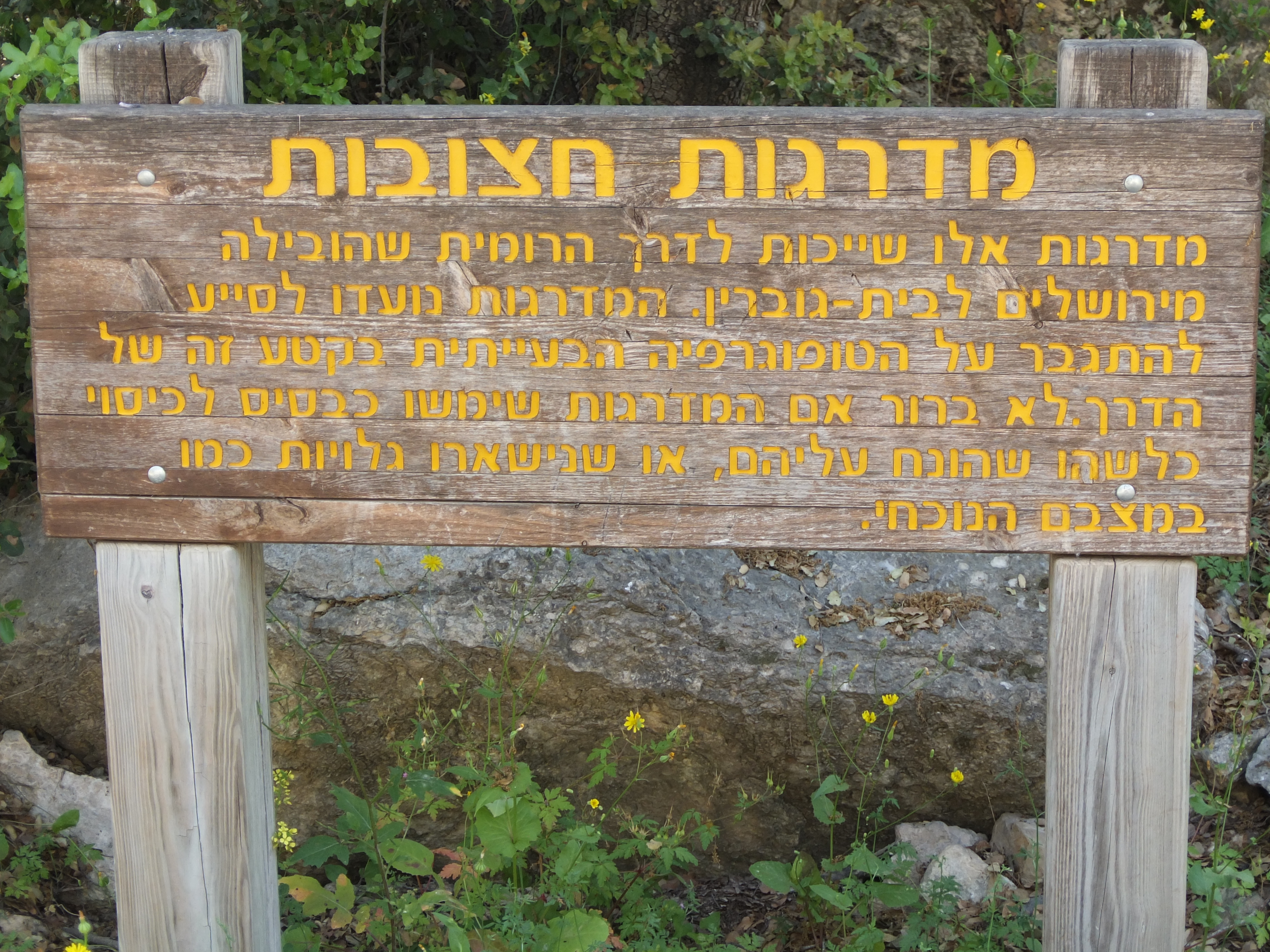
Signpost describing Roman road, near Mata

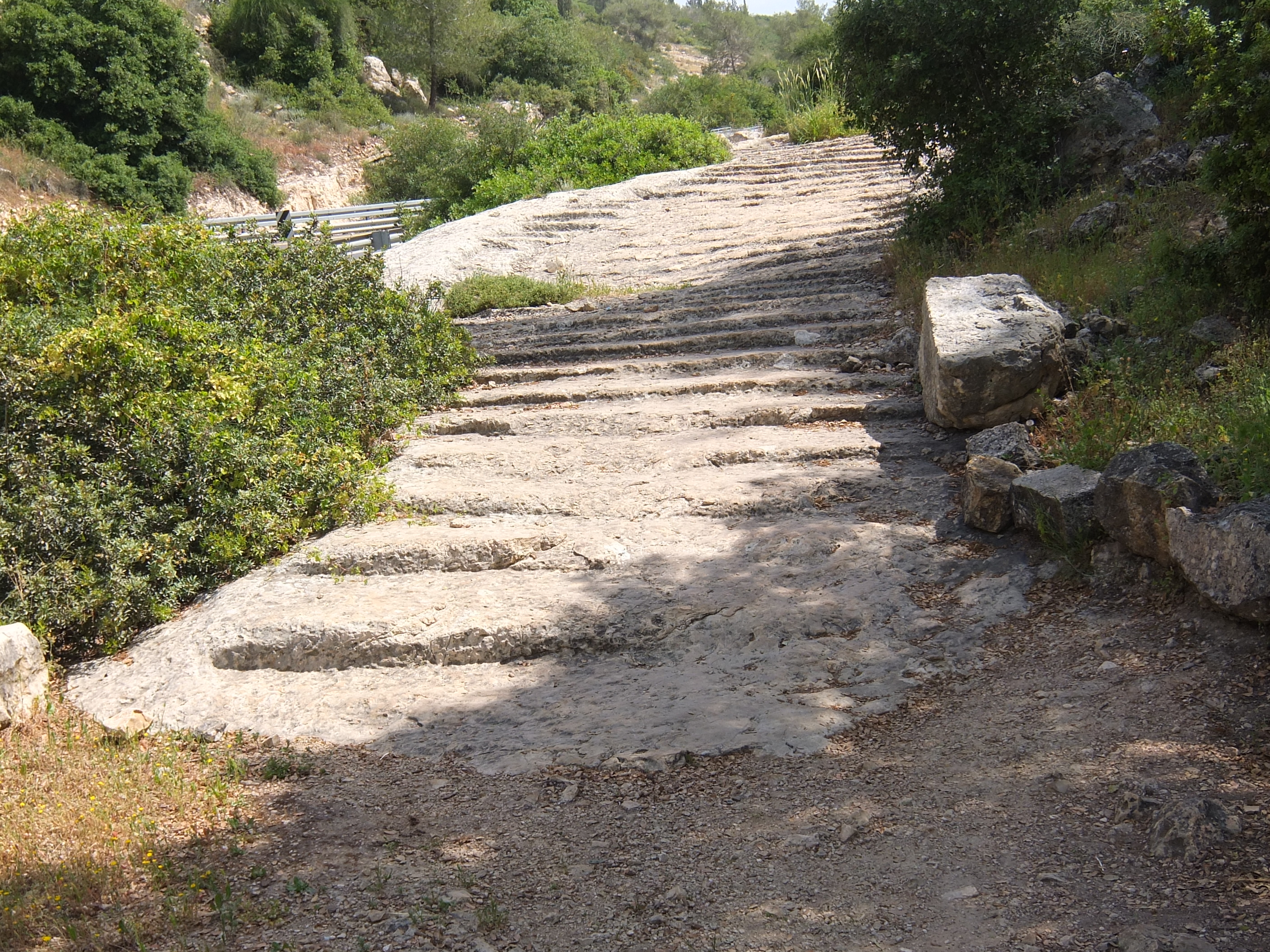
Old Roman road, adjacent to regional hwy 375 in Israel

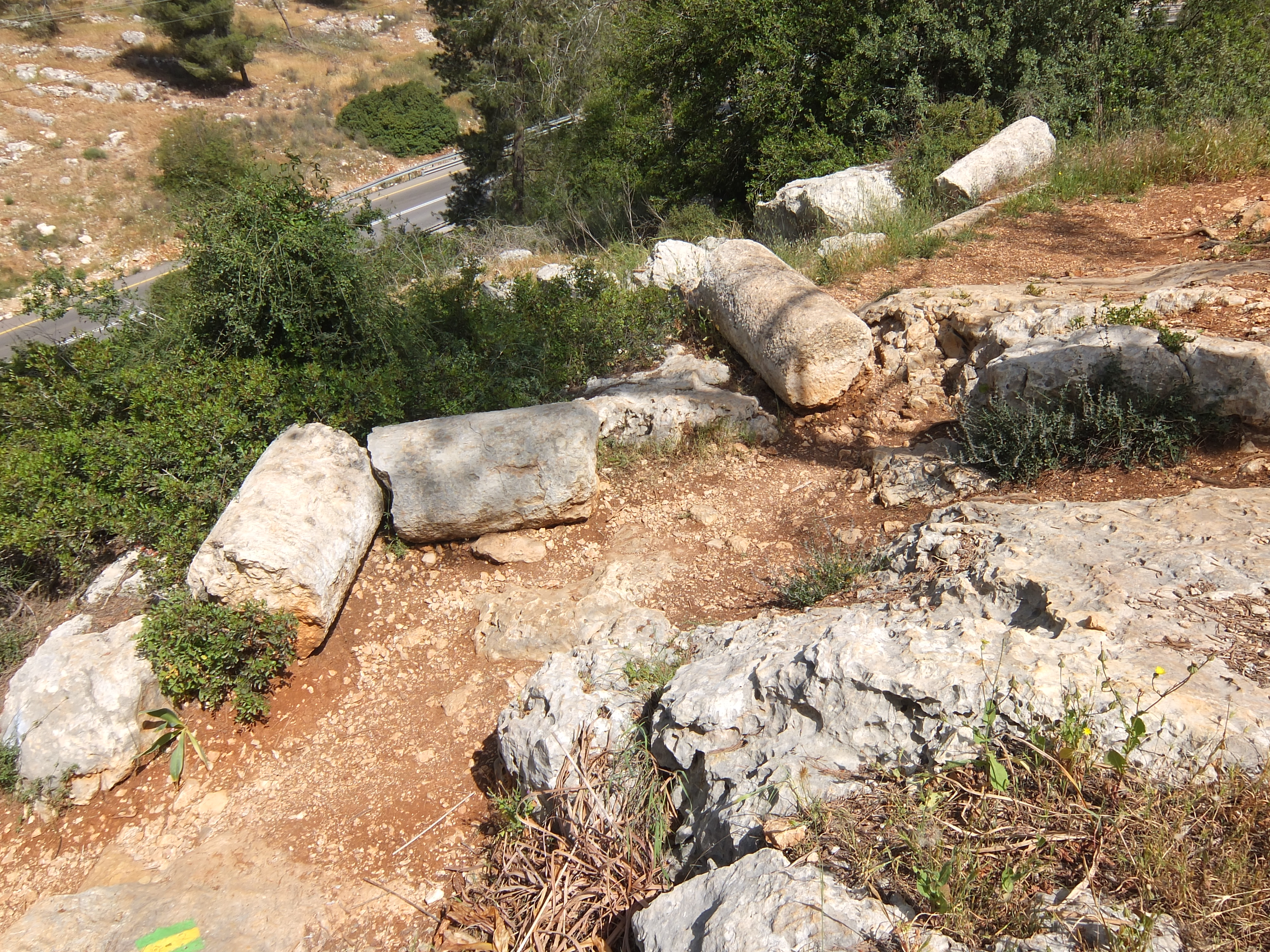
Roman period columns, fallen along old Roman road
