= Allar (given name) =

Estonian male given name

- Gender: Male
- Language: Estonian

Origin
- Region of origin: Estonia

Allar is an Estonian-language male given name.

People named Allar include:

- Allar Jõks (born 1965), Estonian lawyer and the former Chancellor of Justice
- Allar Levandi (born 1965), Estonian Nordic combined skier
- Allar Raja (born 1983), Estonian rower
