= Bar Giora =

Bar Giora: בר גיורא (Hebrew); بار جيورا (Arabic)
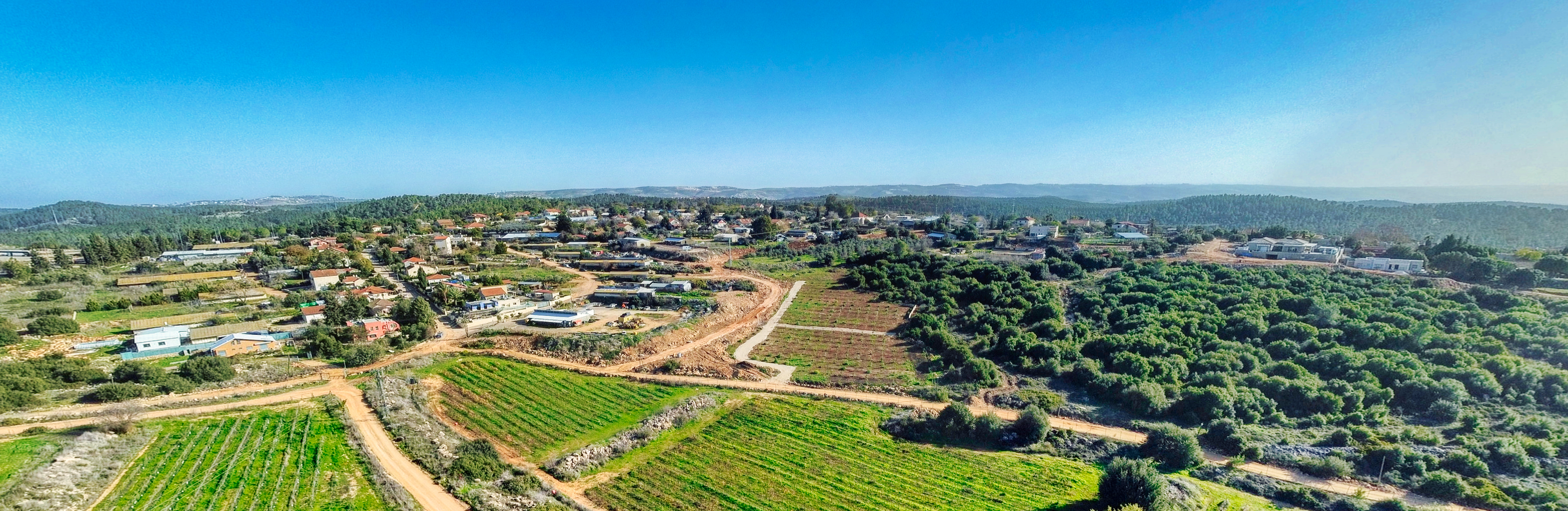

- Location within Jerusalem District
- Coordinates: 31°43′46″N 35°4′20″E
- Country: Israel
- District: Jerusalem
- Council: Mateh Yehuda
- Affiliation: Mishkei Herut Beitar
- Founded: 18 October 1950
- Founder: Yemenite Jews
- Population (2024): 757

Bar Giora (Hebrew: בַּר גִּיּוֹרָא) is a moshav in the Judean Mountains in Israel. Located between Beit Shemesh and Jerusalem, it falls under the jurisdiction of Mateh Yehuda Regional Council. In 2024 it had a population of 757.

== History ==
The village was initially founded by the Herut movement on 18 October 1950 by immigrants from Yemen, and was first named Allar-Bet, later to be called Ramat Shimon. It was established on land that had previously belonged to the Palestinian village of Allar, which became depopulated during the 1948 Arab–Israeli War. It is situated northeast of the Allar village site.

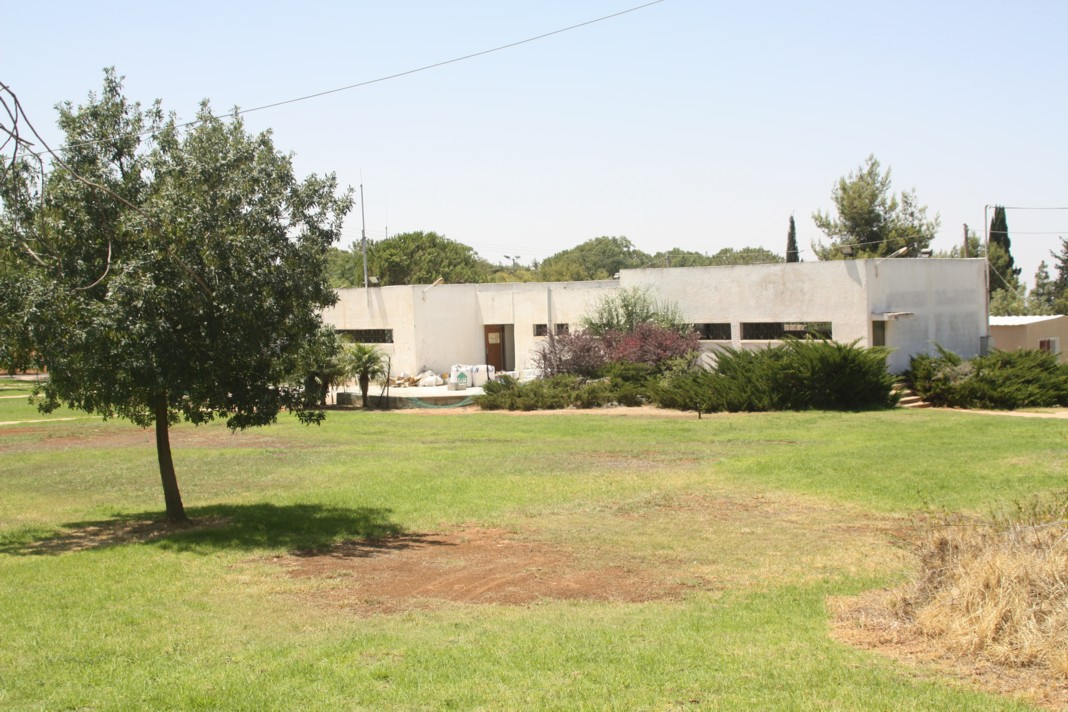
Bar Giora "Beit Haam"

The village was also called Eitanim, until residents eventually settled on the name Bar-Giora, after Simon Bar Giora. The Yemenite immigrants, dissatisfied with conditions in their new village, abandoned the village after a short stint of 2–3 years, and in 1954 the village was resettled by immigrants from Morocco.

== Attractions ==
The village is home to the Sea Horse and Bar Giora wineries.
