= Jarash =

There are at least two places called Jarash (Arabic: جرش):

- Jerash, a city in Jordan where there are ancient ruins
- Jarash, Jerusalem, a former Palestinian village
