= Gerasa (Judaea) =

Town destroyed by Romans during First Jewish Revolt

Gerasa (Greek: Γέρασα, romanized: Gérasa) was an ancient Jewish town mentioned by the historian Josephus (The Jewish War, 4.9.1) as being sacked by the Imperial Roman army under Lucius Annius during the First Jewish-Roman War.

== Background and early history ==
In the beginning of the First Jewish-Roman War, around 66 CE, a place called Gerasa (Hebrew: גרש) (Ǧeraš) was overrun by the troops of Vespasian, under the command of Lucius Annius, who after taking the town, slew of its able-bodied men and took captive their wives and children. Afterwards, the Roman soldiers with their auxiliaries proceeded to set fire to their houses and to the houses in the adjoining villages, until war had engulfed the entire hill country. Josephus does not specify its location, but later authors, like Jacob N. Simchoni (1884-1926) (q.v. in Hebrew), has specified that it was in Judaea.

== Identification ==
Several attempts have been made to identify the Gerasa of Judea, the vast majority of scholars concurring that the ancient site is not to be confused with Gerasa (Jarash) of Transjordan, but with a site in Judea proper.

=== Khirbet Jurish (Judea) ===
(31.715549°N 35.083730°E)

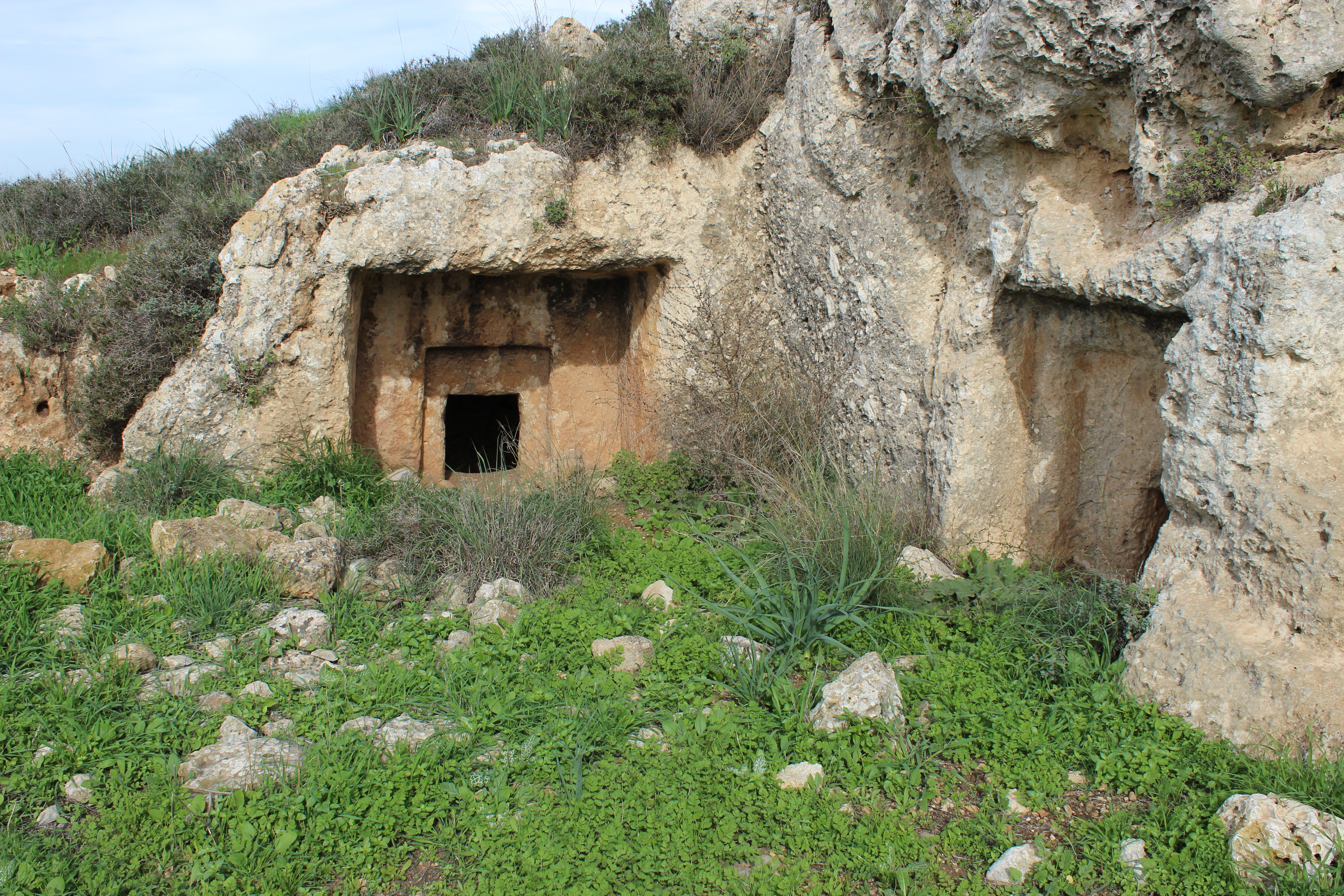
Khirbet Jurish

Khirbet Jurish is the most recent contender for the 1st-century town of Gerasa mentioned by Josephus. Archaeologists Boaz Zissu and Ze'ev Safrai who have studied the various options have both concluded that the site is to be identified with Khirbet Jurish which once stood along the ancient Roman road from Jerusalem to Beit Gubrin, and which is now protected by the Israel Nature and Parks Authority. The ruins of the site presently stand on a hill to the west of Tzur Hadassa, on Har Kitron.

The site, surveyed by archaeologist Boaz Zissu on behalf of the Israel Antiquities Authority, covers an area of about 40 dunams (9.8 acres) and sits at an elevation of 751 metres (2,464 ft) above sea-level. The ruin lay adjacent to the old Jerusalem-Beit Gubrin Roman road, and was visited by PEF explorers, Conder and Kitchener. Three or four ritual immersion baths (miqva'ot) have been discovered on the site, attesting to it being an ancient Jewish settlement. The site also contains a large bottle-shaped cistern, with a depth of about 6 meters, and a bottom measuring 4.3 x 4.7 meters. Potsherds found on the site have been dated back to the Hellenistic, early Roman, and Byzantine periods. On the western slope of the ruin are five rock-carved sepulchres, attesting to the site's antiquity.

=== Jarash Judea ===
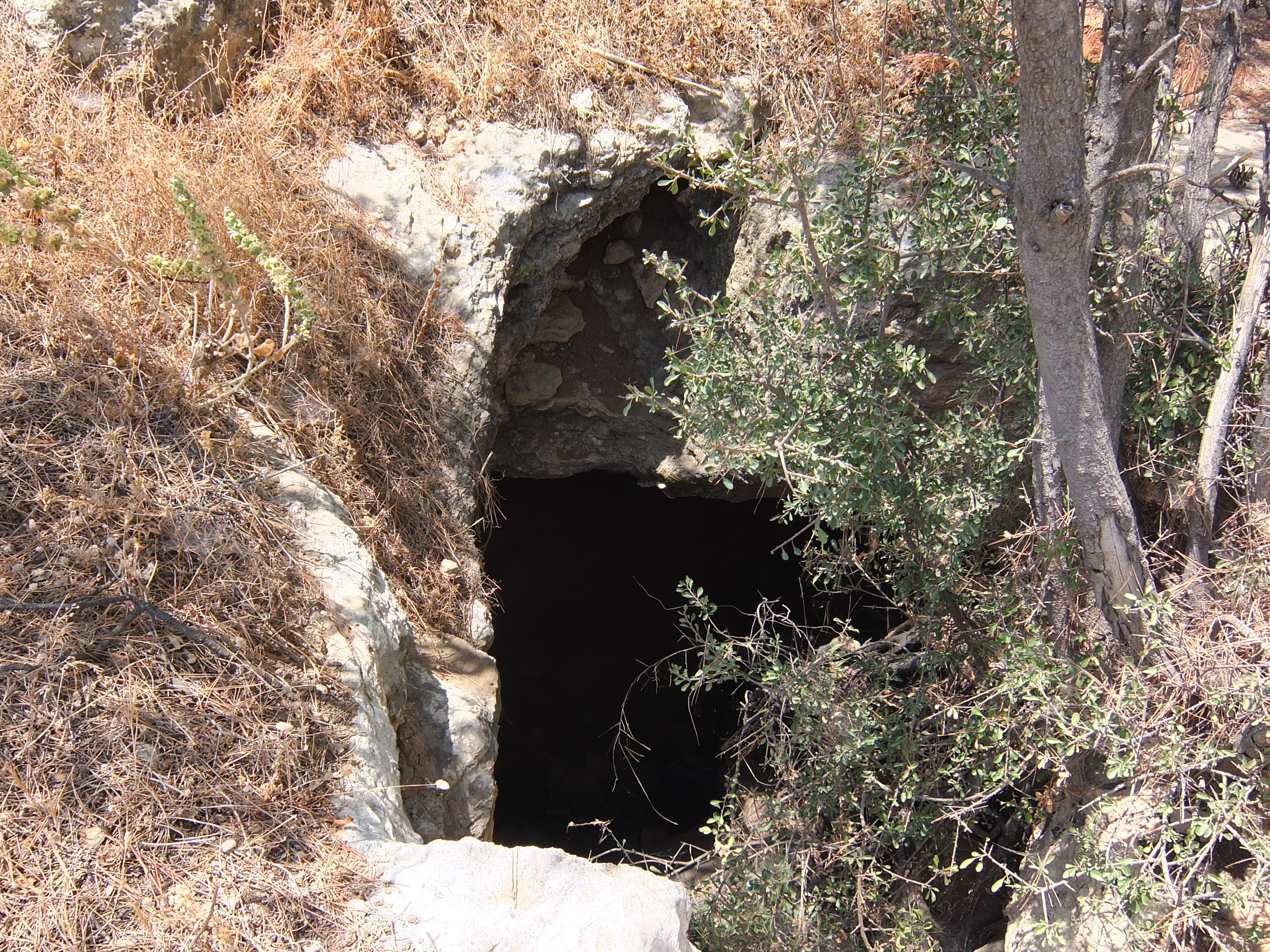
Cave in Jarash, Jerusalem

(31.729722°N 35.016111°E)

Jarash, a former Palestinian village situated 3.5 km. south of Hartuv, was suggested by Isaiah Press as meeting the description of Josephus' Gerasa in Judea. It appears to have been a farmstead during the Second Temple period. Even so, the area is notably smaller than the previously mentioned site.

=== Gezer ===
(31.859°N 34.919°E)

Adriaan Reland suggested that Gerasa should be read as Gezer. Others (Schlatter, 1913: 39; Nestle, 90; M.L. Fischer) also adopted this opinion. Safrai and Klein, however, reject this opinion, saying that this was highly unlikely, since Gezer had already been subdued prior to the capture of Gerasa (ibid. 4.9.1), and that a Roman camp was stationed in Emmaus (near Gezer).

== Places outside of Judaea proper ==
=== Jurish (Samaria) ===
(32.1025°N 35.322222°E)

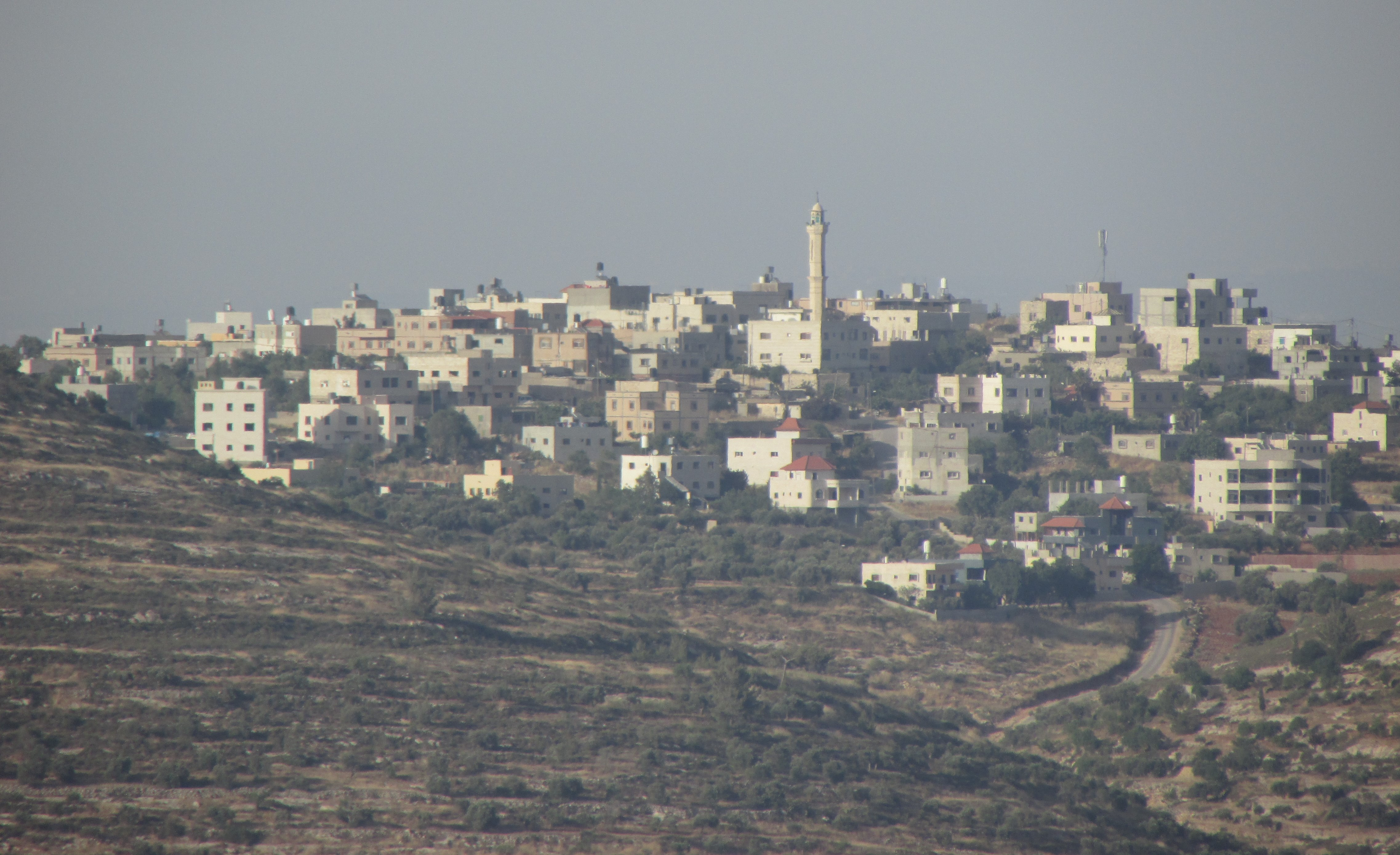
Jurish (Samaria)

Jurish was long thought to be the birthplace of Simon Bar-Giora, and the Jewish stronghold taken by the Romans under Lucius Annius, during Vespasian's military campaign to encircle Jerusalem and to make the people's escape into other regions more difficult. Those who supported this view were Shalem (1940), Avi-Yonah (1976), Yoram Tsafrir and co-editors (1994), and Israel Finkelstein (1997), among others. Safrai (1980/81) and Zissu (2007) have argued, from the sequence of events, that the toparchy of Akrabat (Acrabatenne) and the region adjoining thereto (i.e. Jurish of Samaria) were subdued by the Romans about one year after Vespasian's forces completed the encirclement of Jerusalem and had erected citadels in Jericho and in Adida, and had destroyed Gerasa in Judea, based on the timeline of these events in Josephus, The Jewish War 4:487 and 4:550–551.

=== Jerash (Decapolis) ===
(32.272281°N 35.891397°E)

The site Jerash in Transjordan (Gerasa) is often mentioned in the writings of Josephus. The recent debate by scholars, however, does not concern those references, but rather one reference in Josephus (The Jewish War 4.9.1) and where this Gerasa was thought to be of strategic importance, and that its capture deemed necessary by the Romans to quell the revolt in Jerusalem. Josephus' reference to this Gerasa has intrigued many scholars. H. St. J. Thackeray, translator and editor of Josephus' The Jewish War (4.9.1), and John Kitto, have both thought that this Gerasa is none other than the site Jerash in Transjordan.

Colonnades in Jerash of Transjordan

Historical geographers have argued against Thackeray's view, claiming that Jerash in Transjordan was a Greek city on the side of the Romans, and even if the Jews had taken possession of Gerasa and expelled the Greeks, it leaves unexplained why Annius destroyed the city and also devastated the surrounding area - in the area of the Decapolis which was hardly Jewish; in fact, the excavations there have revealed no destruction at the time of the Jewish uprising. Samuel Klein takes the argument further, writing "Gerasa. The Jewish War 4.9.1. They have already made it known, quite consummately, that it is impossible to say that his intention here is to the city Gerasa which is in Transjordan. For this reason, some have sought to make different emendations [to the original text]: such as by changing the word to read 'Gazara', that is to say, 'Gezer,' etc. However, these same people who assay to 'correct' the text do not ask themselves what need was there for them (i.e. the Roman army) to capture Gezer in the Shefelah in order to shut-off Jerusalem from all sides? Hadn't they already captured the mountain passes, with Emmaus in the West!?"

== Bibliography ==
- Avi-Yonah, M. (1976). Gazetteer of Roman Palestine, Qedem - Monographs of the Institute of Archaeology [5]. Vol. 2. Jerusalem. (JSTOR 43587090)
- Conder, C.R.; Kitchener, H. H. (1883). The Survey of Western Palestine: Memoirs of the Topography, Orography, Hydrography, and Archaeology. Vol. 3. London: Committee of the Palestine Exploration Fund.
- Finkelstein, I. (1997). Highlands of Many Cultures. Tel-Aviv: Tel-Aviv University. ISBN 965-440-007-3.
- Fischer, M.L.; Isaac, B.H.; Roll, B.H. (1996). Roman Roads in Judaea II: The Jaffa - Jerusalem Roads. Oxford: BAR International Series 628. doi:10.30861/9780860548096. ISBN 978-0-86054-809-6., OCLC 924307777
- Josephus (1957). The Jewish War. Vol. 3. Translated by Henry St. John Thackeray. Cambridge, Mass. / London: Harvard University Press / William Heinemann Ltd. p. 145 (note c). OCLC 715796270., s.v. War 4.9.1 (4.487) (Loeb Classical Library)
- Kitto, J., ed. (1845). A cyclopedia of Biblical literature, edited by John Kitto. Vol. 1. Edinburgh: Adam and Charles Black.
- Klein, S. (1939). Sefer Ha-Yishuv (in Hebrew). Tel-Aviv: Devir. p. 106.
- Möller, Christa; Schmitt, Götz (1976). Siedlungen Palästinas nach Flavius Josephus" (Settlements of Palestine after Flavius Josephus). Wiesbaden: Dr. Ludwig Reichert Publishers.
- Press, I., ed. (1951), "גרש (b)", Topographical-Historical Encyclopedia of Palestine, vol. 1, Jerusalem: Rubin Mass, p. 174
- Safrai, Z. (1980). Boundaries and Government in the Land of Israel (in Hebrew). Tel-Aviv.
- Safrai, Z. (1980–81). A. Oppenheimer; U. Rappaport; M. Stern (eds.). Jerusalem in the Second Temple Period - Abraham Schalit Memorial Volume (in Hebrew). Jerusalem: Ben-Zvi Institute. p. 327. ISBN 965-217-000-3.OCLC 4640562610
- Schlatter, A. (1913). Die hebräischen Namen bei Josephus (in German). Gütersloh: C. Bertelsmann.
- Shalem (1940). "Bibliography - Patterns of Eretz Yisrael". Kiryat Sefer. 17: 172.
- Simchoni, Jacob N. (1968). The History of the War of the Jews with the Romans (in Hebrew). Ramat-Gan: Masada.
- Tsafrir, Y. (1994). Tabula Imperii Romanii: Iudaea, Palaestina [Maps and Gazetteer]. Jerusalem: The Israel Academy of Sciences and Humanities. ISBN 9789652081070.
- Zissu, Boaz (2007). Ya'acov Eshel (ed.). "Excavations and Surveys - Identification of Gerasa in Judea". Judea and Samaria Research Studies (in Hebrew). 16. Ariel: 219–231.
