= Wadi Fukin =

- Municipality type D (Village council)

Arabic transcription(s)
  - Arabic: وادي فوكين
  - Latin: Wadi Fukin (official); Wadi Foukin (unofficial)
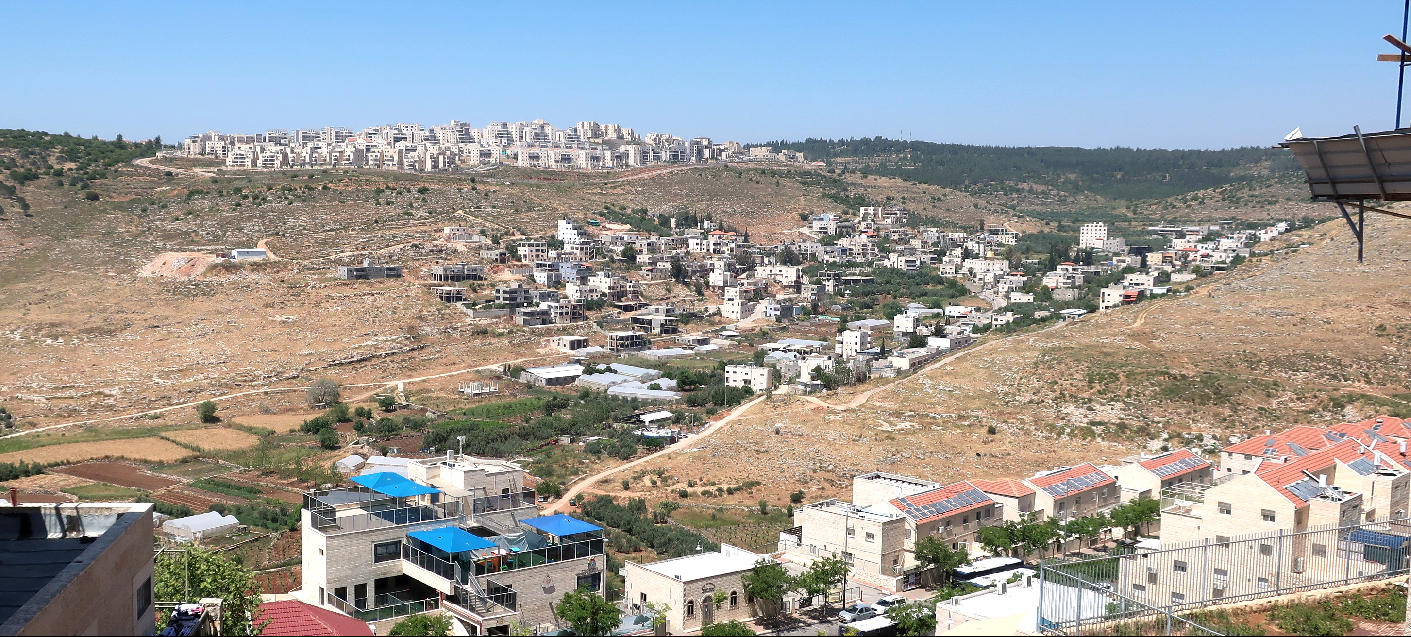
- Wadi Fukin as seen from Beitar Illit

- Location of Wadi Fukin within Palestine
- Coordinates: 31°42′24″N 35°06′14″E
- Palestine grid: 159/123
- State: State of Palestine
- Governorate: Bethlehem

Government
  - Type: Village council
  - Head of Municipality: Bassam Manasra

Area
  - Total: 4.3 km^{2} (1.7 sq mi)

Population (2017)
  - Total: 1,342
  - Density: 310/km^{2} (810/sq mi)
- Name meaning: "Valley of thorns" or "Valley of Fukin"

Wadi Fukin (Arabic: وادي فوقين) is a Palestinian village in the West Bank, eight kilometers southwest of Bethlehem in the Bethlehem Governorate. The village is located on 700 acres of land, between the Green Line and the Israeli West Bank barrier, with the Israeli settlement of Beitar Illit on one side and the Israeli town of Tzur Hadasa on the other. According to the Palestinian Central Bureau of Statistics, Wadi Fukin had a population of over 1,342 in 2017. The village relies on agriculture as its primary source of income. Israel served eviction orders on the village in September 2014.

Ahmad Sukkar is the head of the village council.

== History ==
Ancient remains have been found in the area, including remains of a chapel, cisterns, burial caves in rock, columbarium, and Byzantine ceramics.

At Kh. Ain Al-Kanisah, just east of Wadi Fukin, there are the remains of a church. The church had two construction phases; the first in the 5th-7th century C.E., the second construction phase was probably between the 8th and the 11th century.

=== Ottoman period ===
Wadi Fukin, like the rest of Palestine, was incorporated into the Ottoman Empire in 1517, and in the Ottoman census of 1596, the village, called Fuqin, was in the Nahiya of Quds of the Liwa of Al Quds. It had an entirely Muslim population of 20 households. A fixed tax rate of 33.3% was paid on agricultural products, including wheat, barley, olives, grape syrup/molasses, goats and/or beehives; a total of 2,280 akçe.

In 1838, it was noted as a Muslim village, Wady Fukin, in the el-Arkub District, southwest of Jerusalem.

Victor Guérin visited the village in the 1863, which he described as "half ruined", with a small number of people. He noted that the village was the successor to an ancient town, as he found several ancient tombs carved into rock. An official Ottoman village list from about 1870 showed that Wad Fukin had a total of 22 houses and a population of 62, though the population count included only men.

In 1883, the PEF's Survey of Western Palestine described Wad Fukin as "A small stone village on the side of a hill, with a good spring in the valley below on the south-west. There are gardens of oranges and lemons near the spring. To the west of the village there are rock-cut tombs. To the east is a second spring, Ain el Keniseh."

In 1896 the population of Wadi Fukin was estimated to be about 123 persons.

=== British Mandate period ===
In the 1922 census of Palestine, conducted by the British Mandate authorities, Wadi Fukin had a population of 149, all Muslims. In the 1931 census the population of Wadi Fukin was 205, still all Muslim, in 45 inhabited houses.

In the 1945 statistics the population of Wady Fukin was 280, all Muslim, who owned 9,928 dunams of land according to an official land and population survey. Of this, 226 dunams were plantations and irrigable land, 863 for cereals, while 6 dunams were built-up (urban) land.

=== 1948−1967 ===
Prior to the 1948 Arab–Israeli War, Wadi Fukin was raided by the Haganah a number of times and several inhabitants fled to the Dheisheh camp established just south of Bethlehem. They returned during the Jordanian rule.

The expulsion at Wadi Fukin led to a change in the Green line with an exchange of fertile land in the Bethlehem area transferred to Israeli control and the village of Wadi Fukin being given to Jordanian control. On 15 July 1949 the Israeli Army expelled the population of Wadi Fukin after the village had been transferred to the Israeli-occupied area under the terms of the Armistice Agreement concluded between Israel and Jordan. The Mixed Armistice Commission decided on 31 August 1949, by a majority vote, that Israel had violated the Armistice Agreement by expelling villagers of Wadi Fukin across the demarcation line and decided that the villagers should be allowed to return to their homes. However, when the villagers returned to Wadi Fukin under the supervision of the United Nations observers on September 6, 1949, they found most of their houses destroyed and were again compelled by the Israeli Army to return to Jordanian controlled territory. The United Nations Chairman of the Mixed Commission, Colonel Garrison B. Coverdale (US), pressed for a solution of this issue to be found in the Mixed Armistice Commission, in an amicable and UN spirit. After some hesitation, an adjustment in the Green Line was accepted and finally an agreement was reached whereby the Armistice line was changed to give back Wadi Fukin to the Jordanian authority who, in turn, agreed to transfer some uninhabited, but fertile territory south of Bethlehem to the Israeli authority in November 1949.

== Post−1967 ==
Since the Six-Day War in 1967, the whole of Wadi Fukin has been under Israeli occupation. The villagers fled once more after the occupation in 1967. In 1972, the inhabitants were permitted to return to Wadi Fukin on the basis that they construct their homes within a month. The residents built a school and an access road, in addition to bringing electricity to the village. The World Lutheran Federation was one of the groups that helped fund these projects. The Mennonite Centre in East Jerusalem and the Agricultural Relief Committee helped introduce drip irrigation systems and other farming improvements.

After the 1995 accords, most of the village's land, roughly 667 acres, was classified as Area C under complete Israeli control and military administration. Obtaining building permits from that authority is, according to residents, all but impossible.

In late August 2014, Israel declared 1,000 acres near Wadi Fukin was state land. Many of Wadi Fukin's villagers with plots on that land have, according to their attorney, a kushan testifying to their legal ownership around two-thirds of areas within this confiscated land.

== Geography ==
Wadi Fukin has a total land area of 434.7 hectares (4,347 dunams), 20.1 hectares of which are built-up. Much of the remaining land is planted with orchards and vineyards. Israel allotted 5.1 hectares to Israeli settlements near the town and an additional 88.5 hectares were confiscated in 2005. The Israeli West Bank barrier separates 103.9 hectares from the majority of the town's area. As a result of the Interim Agreement on the West Bank and the Gaza Strip in 1995, 93.6% of Wadi Fukin's land is located in Area C (complete Israeli control), while 6.4% is located in Area B, which is under the administration of the Palestinian National Authority and Israeli security. Wadi Fukin is connected to Bethlehem by the village's main road.

The village is watered by 11 springs used to irrigate hundreds of small farm plots using a system of canals and dams. Armed Israeli settlers have made these areas unsafe for their local Palestinian owners.

== Infrastructure ==
There are two elementary schools, a mosque, a pharmacy and health clinic in Wadi Fukin. The area around Wadi Fukin is known for its stone masonry, and a stone-cutting factory is located in the village.

== Organic farming ==
Wadi Fukin has long been known for the high quality of its agricultural produce. Friends of the Earth Middle East, a joint Israeli-Palestinian-Jordanian organization, taught the villagers ecological and organic farming techniques, but the presence of military checkpoints has prevented them from marketing their produce in Israel where prices are higher. Residents of Tzur Hadassah, an Israeli bedroom community bounding the village to the west, were the first to buy from the villagers, paying a fixed weekly price for fresh seasonal produce. Another project in October 2007 involved direct marketing of the produce to households in Jerusalem.

== Bibliography ==
- Barron, J.B., ed. (1923). Palestine: Report and General Abstracts of the Census of 1922. Government of Palestine.
- Conder, C.R.; Kitchener, H.H. (1883). The Survey of Western Palestine: Memoirs of the Topography, Orography, Hydrography, and Archaeology. Vol. 3. London: Committee of the Palestine Exploration Fund.
- Dauphin, C. (1998). La Palestine byzantine, Peuplement et Populations. BAR International Series 726 (in French). Vol. III : Catalogue. Oxford: Archeopress. ISBN 0-860549-05-4.
- Department of Statistics (1945). Village Statistics, April, 1945. Government of Palestine.
- Guérin, V. (1869). Description Géographique Historique et Archéologique de la Palestine (in French). Vol. 1: Judee, pt. 3. Paris: L'Imprimerie Nationale.
- Hadawi, S. (1970). Village Statistics of 1945: A Classification of Land and Area ownership in Palestine. Palestine Liberation Organization Research Center.
- Hartmann, M. (1883). "Die Ortschaftenliste des Liwa Jerusalem in dem türkischen Staatskalender für Syrien auf das Jahr 1288 der Flucht (1871)". Zeitschrift des Deutschen Palästina-Vereins. 6: 102–149.
- Hütteroth, W.-D.; Abdulfattah, K. (1977). Historical Geography of Palestine, Transjordan and Southern Syria in the Late 16th Century. Erlanger Geographische Arbeiten, Sonderband 5. Erlangen, Germany: Vorstand der Fränkischen Geographischen Gesellschaft. ISBN 3-920405-41-2.
- Mills, E., ed. (1932). Census of Palestine 1931. Population of Villages, Towns and Administrative Areas. Jerusalem: Government of Palestine.
- Palmer, E.H. (1881). The Survey of Western Palestine: Arabic and English Name Lists Collected During the Survey by Lieutenants Conder and Kitchener, R. E. Transliterated and Explained by E.H. Palmer. Committee of the Palestine Exploration Fund.
- Pringle, D. (1993). The Churches of the Crusader Kingdom of Jerusalem: A-K (excluding Acre and Jerusalem). Vol. I. Cambridge University Press. ISBN 0-521-39036-2.
- Robinson, E.; Smith, E. (1841). Biblical Researches in Palestine, Mount Sinai and Arabia Petraea: A Journal of Travels in the year 1838. Vol. 3. Boston: Crocker & Brewster.
- Schick, C. (1896). "Zur Einwohnerzahl des Bezirks Jerusalem". Zeitschrift des Deutschen Palästina-Vereins. 19: 120–127.
- Socin, A. (1879). "Alphabetisches Verzeichniss von Ortschaften des Paschalik Jerusalem". Zeitschrift des Deutschen Palästina-Vereins. 2: 135–163.
