= Jarash, Jerusalem =

Jarash جرش
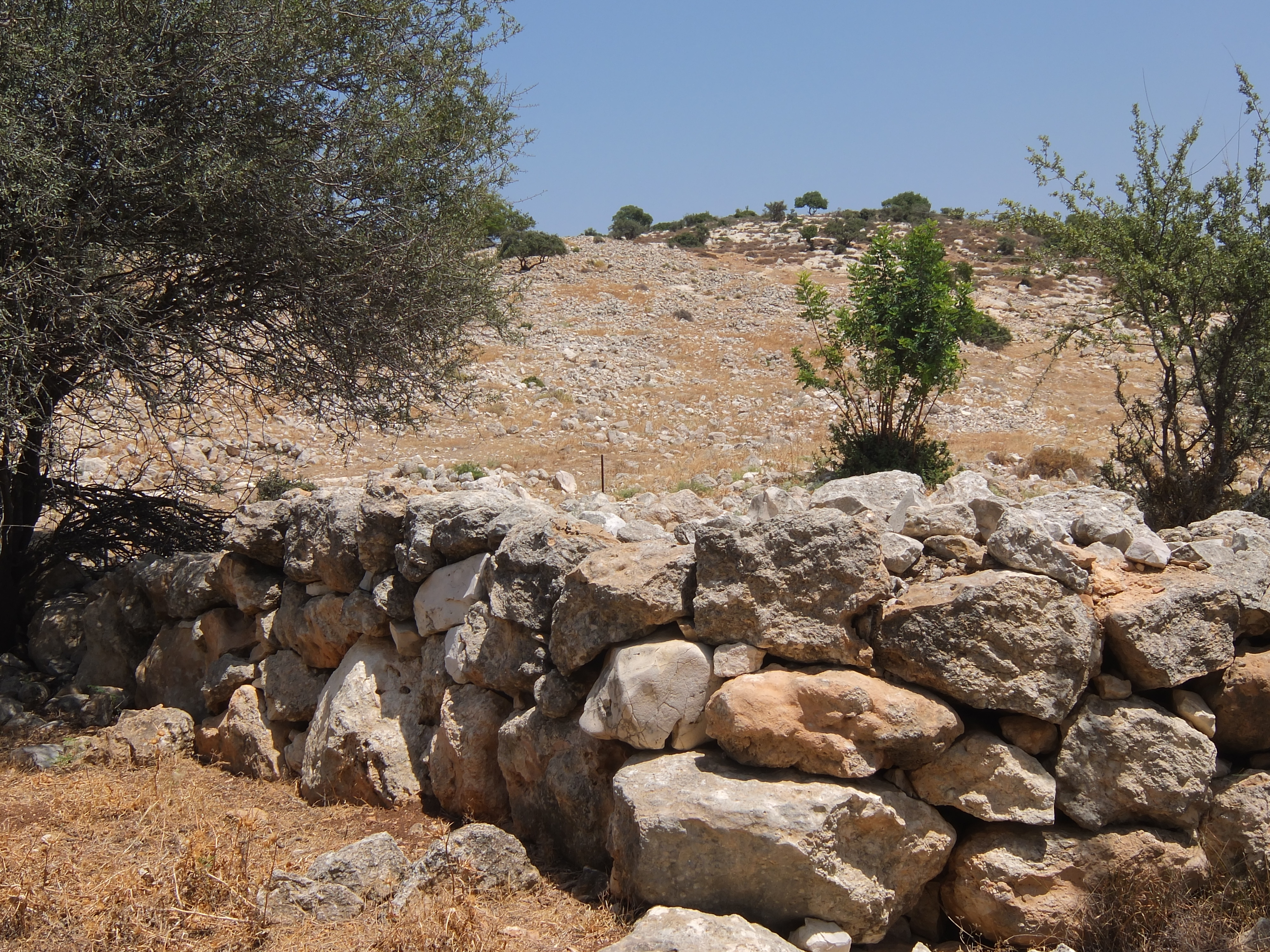
- Ruins of Jarash
- Etymology: Jerash; personal name
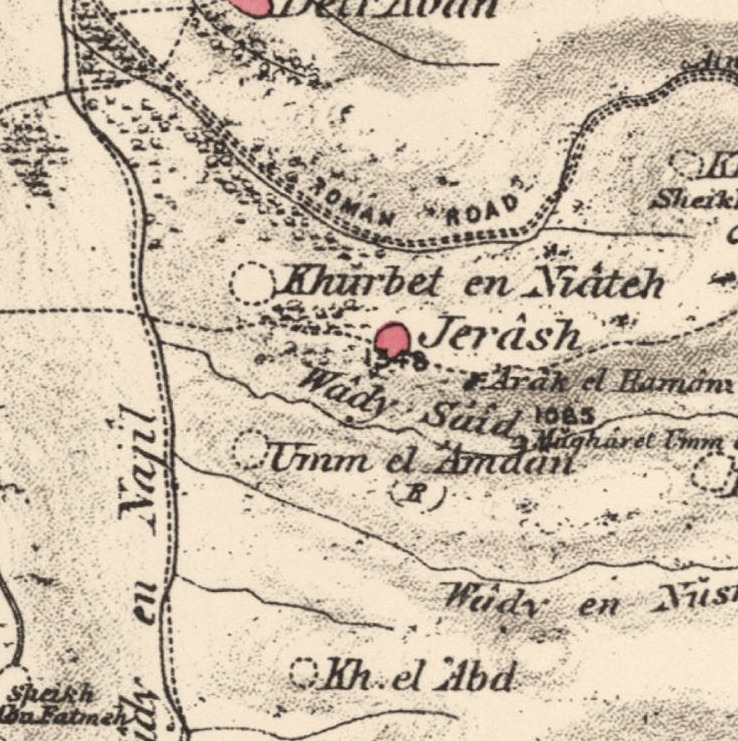
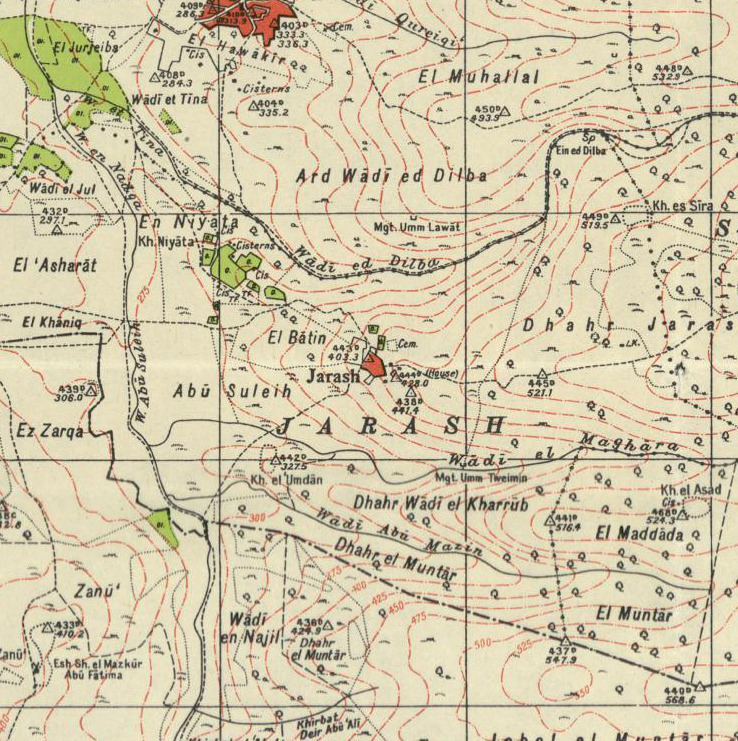
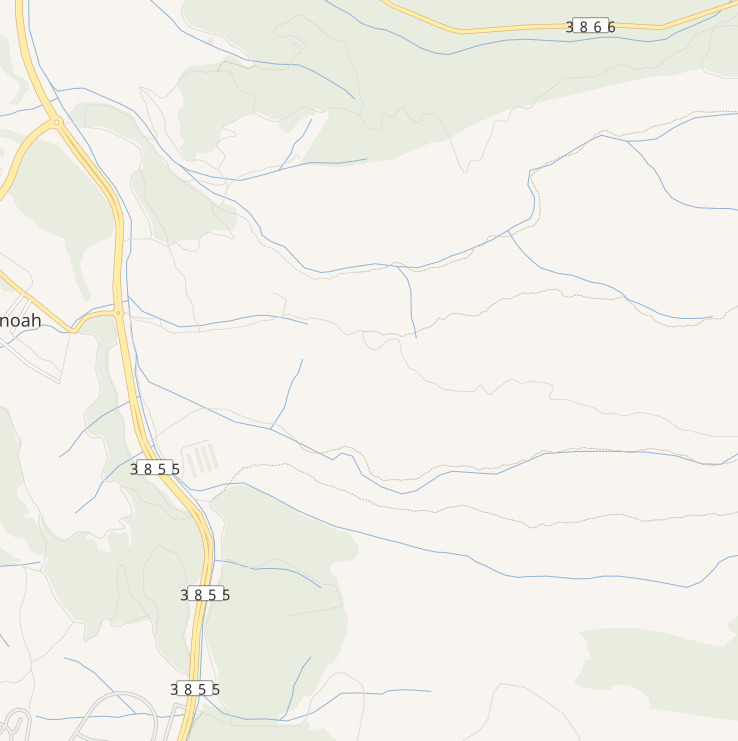
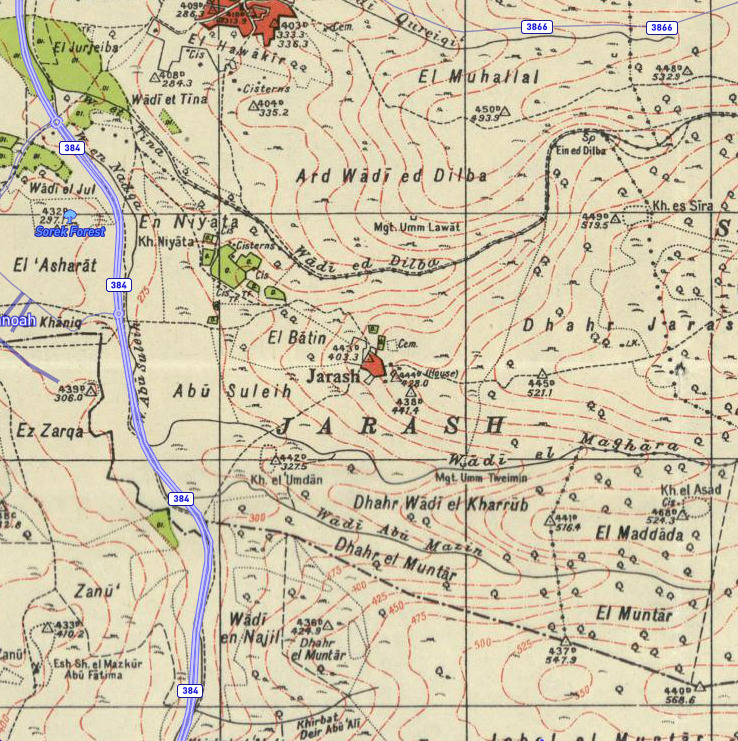
- 1870s map 1940s map modern map 1940s with modern overlay map A series of historical maps of the area around Jarash, Jerusalem (click the buttons)

- Location within Mandatory Palestine
- Coordinates: 31°43′47″N 35°00′58″E
- Palestine grid: 151/126
- Geopolitical entity: Mandatory Palestine
- Subdistrict: Jerusalem
- Date of depopulation: 21 October 1948

Area
  - Total: 3,518 dunams (3.518 km^{2}; 1.358 sq mi)

Population (1945)
  - Total: 190
- Cause(s) of depopulation: Military assault by Yishuv forces

Jarash (Arabic: جرش) was a Palestinian village that was depopulated over the course of 1948 Arab-Israeli war. Located 25 kilometers west of Jerusalem, Jarash was a wholly Arab village of 220 inhabitants in 1948. The village was built of stone houses on the spur of a hill, 411 metres (1,348 ft) above sea-level, and lay about 1 km. eastward of the traffic circle opposite Moshav Zanoah, on regional road 3855 that bypasses Beit Shemesh to its east, and which road runs in a northerly-southerly direction along Wadi en Najil (now called Naḥal Zanoah). The immediate region to the west of the site of Jarash, upon two hills separated by a valley, grew orchards belonging to the village inhabitants consisting of carobs, figs, almonds and olives. Cave dwellings dot the landscape of this region.

== History ==
The area immediately to the west of Jarash, as one descends into the valley below, is marked by several very old agricultural terraces, built of large stones. Their use was to retain the top soil and to prevent the soil run-off from heavy rains. The nearby grounds are strewn with potsherds; evidence of an early settlement. To the east of the village lay Khirbat Sira, which is identified as a Mamluk/Ottoman village.

=== Ottoman era ===
In 1838, Jerash was noted as a Muslim village, located in district of el-Arkub, southwest of Jerusalem.

In 1863 Victor Guérin found Jarash to have 25 inhabitants, living at that time in "miserable huts." An Ottoman village list from about 1870 found that the village had a population of 53, in a total of 13 houses, though the population count included men, only.

In 1883, the PEF's Survey of Western Palestine described Jarash as a village built on the spur of a hill with olive trees growing below it.

In 1896 the population of Dscherasch was estimated to be about 105 persons.

=== British Mandate era ===
In the 1922 census of Palestine, conducted by the British Mandate authorities, Jarash had a population 115, all Muslims, increasing in the 1931 census to 164, still all Muslim, in a total of 33 houses.

In the 1945 statistics the population was 190, all Muslims, while the total land area was 3,518 dunams, according to an official land and population survey. Of this, 5 were allocated for plantations and irrigable land, 1,335 for cereals, while 5 dunams were classified as built-up areas.

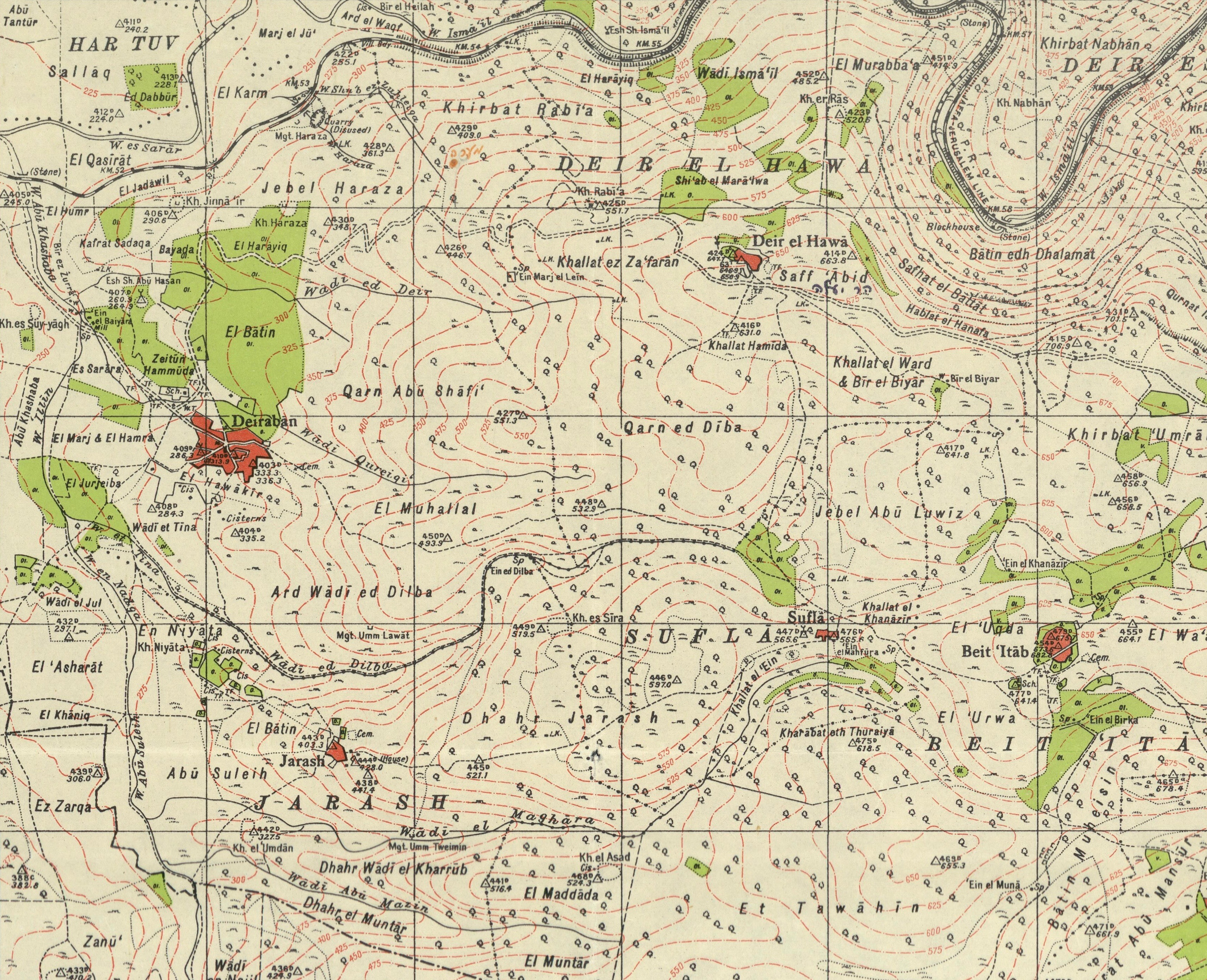
Jarash, Mandate survey, 1:20,000

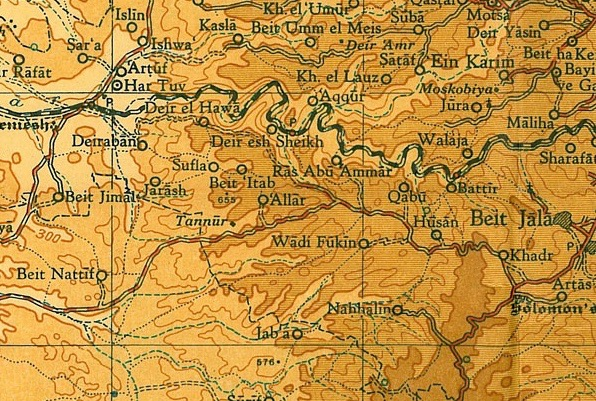
Jarash, 1945, 1:20,000

=== State of Israel ===
Following the war, the area was incorporated into the State of Israel. The town's land was left undeveloped, though Zanoah was founded in 1950, about 2 km west of the village site.

Walid Khalidi writes of Jarash in 1992:

"The site is overgrown with grass, interspersed with the debris of destroyed houses and stones from the terraces. The ruins of a cemetery lie northwest of the site. Groves of trees cover two hills to the west of the site that are separated by a valley. Carob, fig, almond, and olive trees grow on these hills."

=== Archaeology ===
Boaz Zissu of the Israel Antiquities Authority conducted an archaeological survey of Jarash in the year 2000. The old ruins of Jarash lay at the center of a spur, at some 200 meters west of the now ruined Arab village, spread over an area of only about 5 dunams (1.2 acres) and built upon two levels. According to Zissu, the site may have served as a farmstead for share-croppers who worked the adjacent fields. Most of the pottery samples collected in situ date back to the early Roman period, and a few from the Iron Age III era, as well as from the Mameluk era. Structures made of hewn stone were still visible from the Roman era. Two plastered cisterns in an enclosed area are also noticeable on the site. In one corner of the ruin are seen three monolithic, rectangular-shaped pillars ca. 1.7 metres (5.6 ft) high, aligned in a row, still standing upon their original foundation. In the lower level, structures made of field stones are still to be seen there, spread over an area 20 x 30 meters. On the rocky precipice to the east of the site are caves partially filled-in by erosion, with exposed square-like entrances, and wine-presses carved into the rock. Zissu has noted the presence of two ritual ablutions or baths (miqva'ot) in the site, evidence that the site was formerly inhabited by Jews, and raises the suggestion that it may have once been the Gerasa mentioned by Josephus in The Jewish War (4.9.1), although with some reservations, citing a more probable locale in the nearby ruin of Kh. Jurish.

== Gallery ==
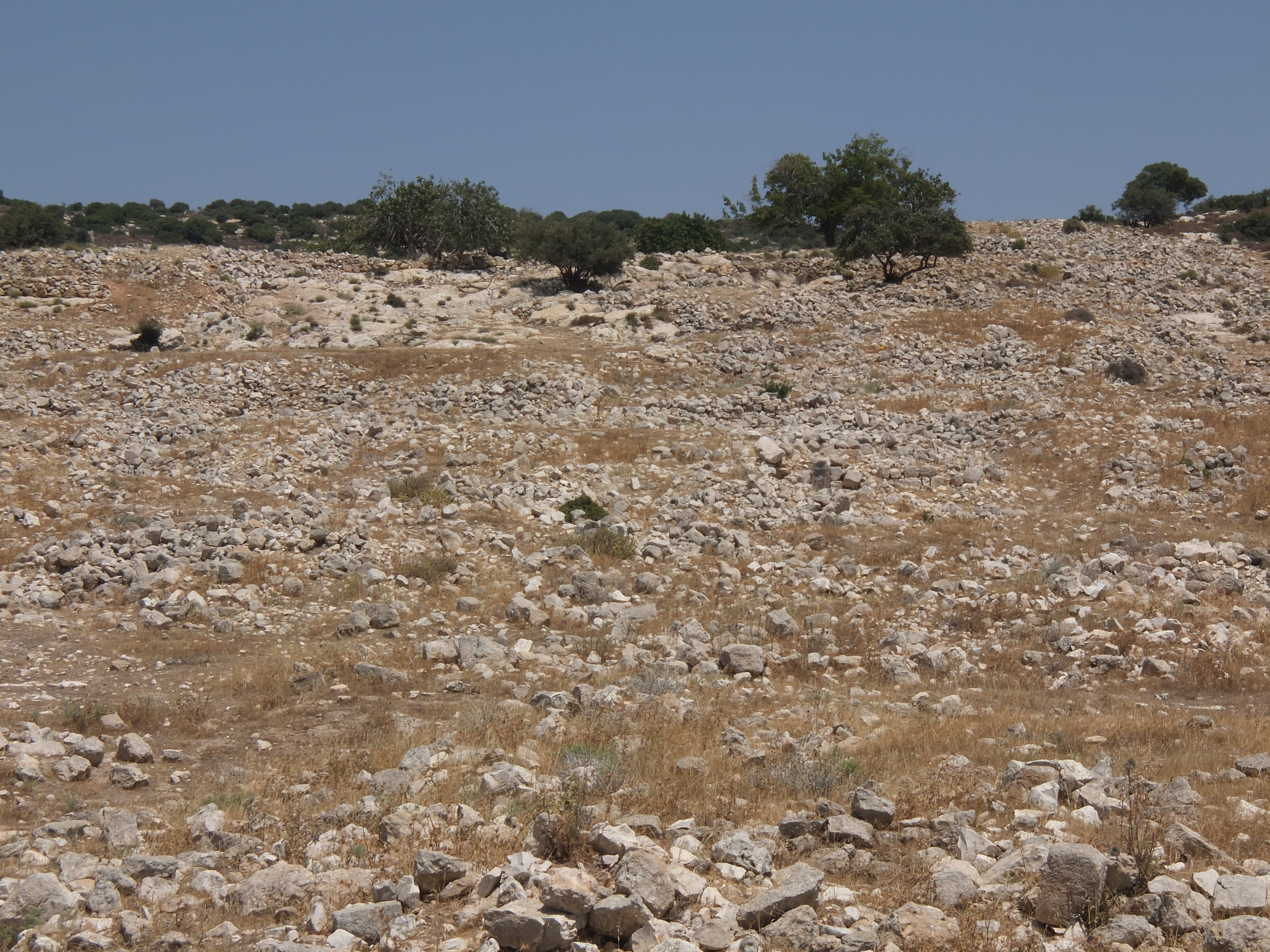
General view of ruins of Jarash

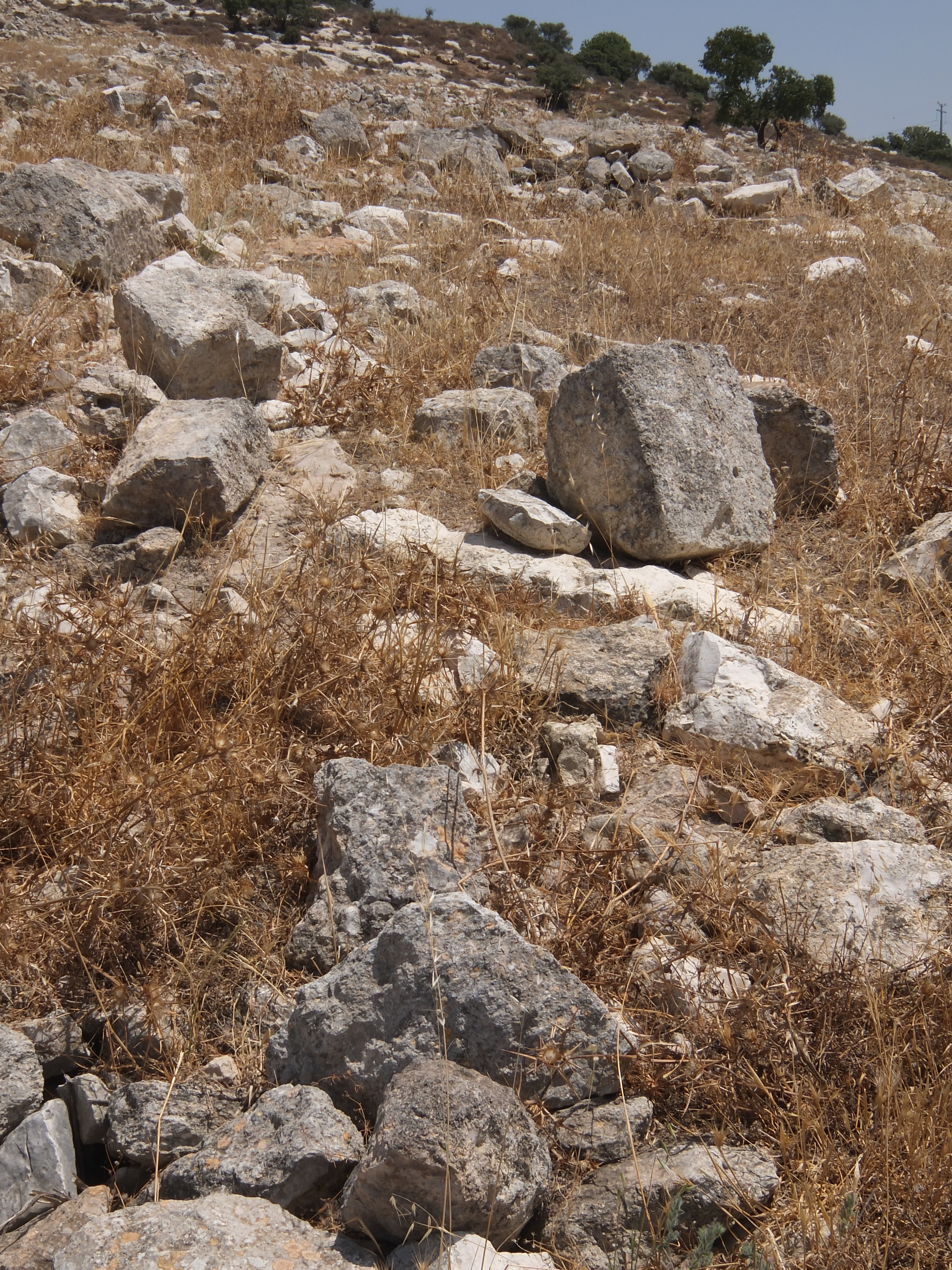
Razed structures in Jarash

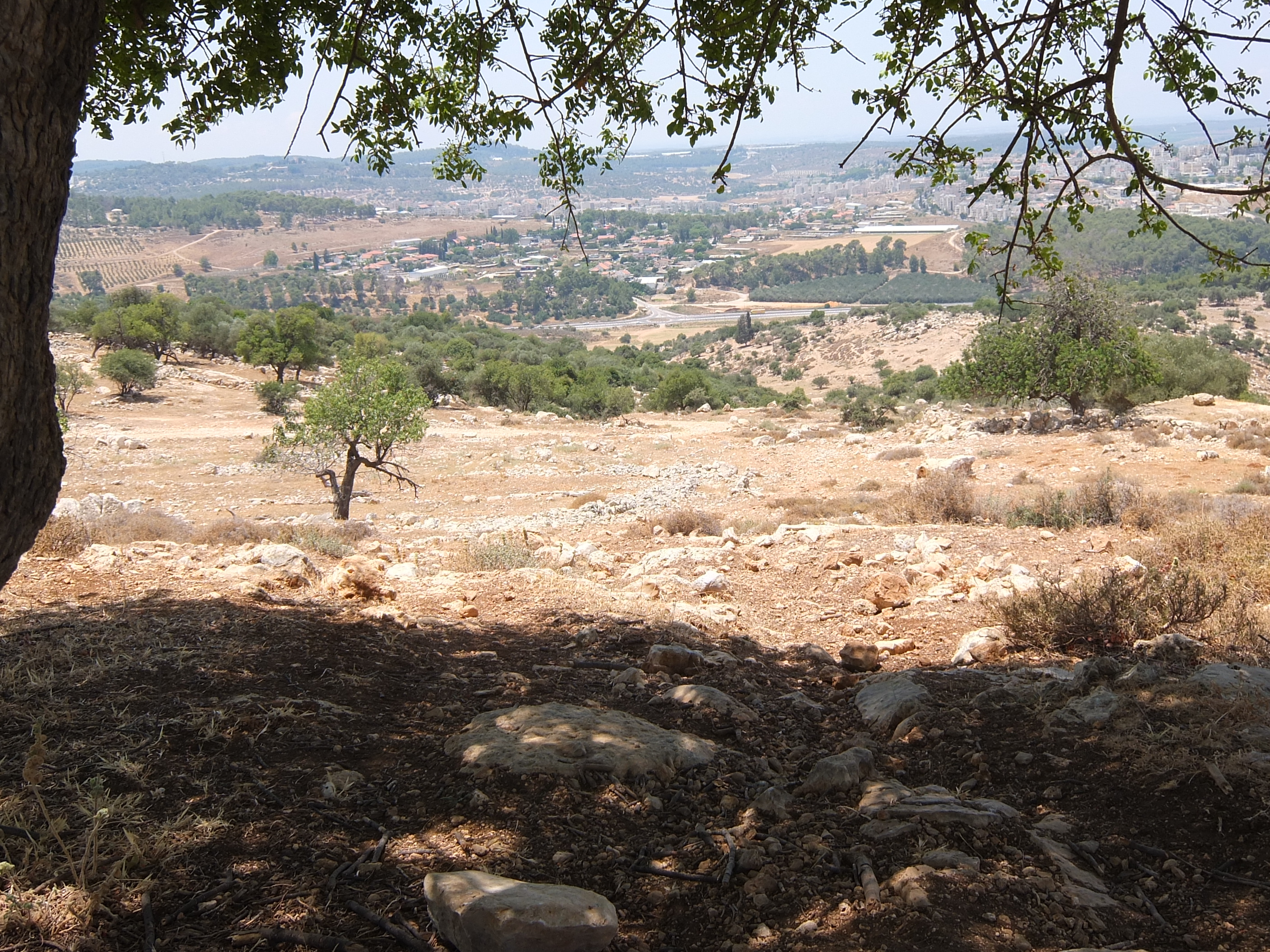
View as seen from Jarash, looking toward Moshav Zanoah

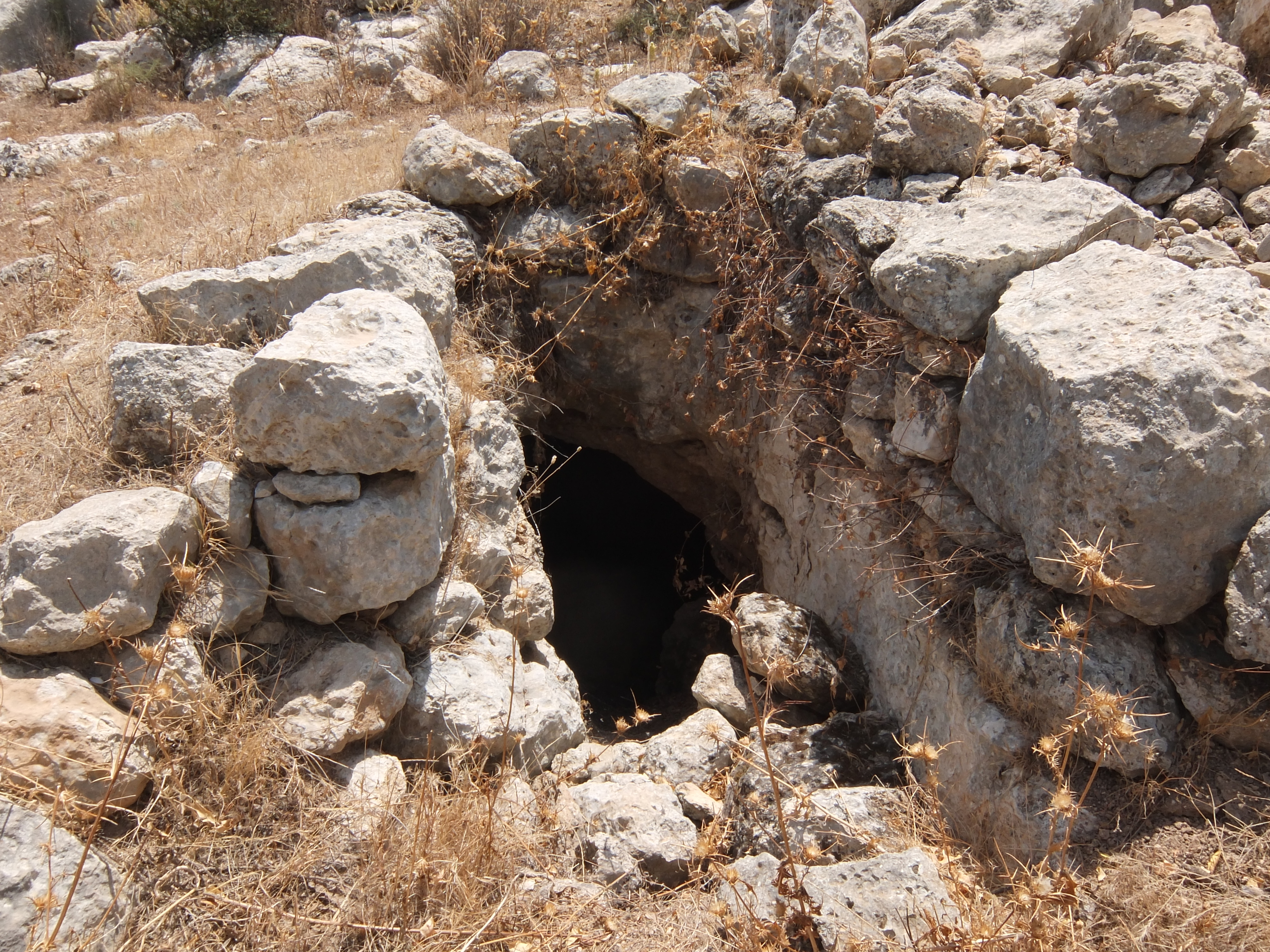
Cave entrance in the vicinity of Jarash

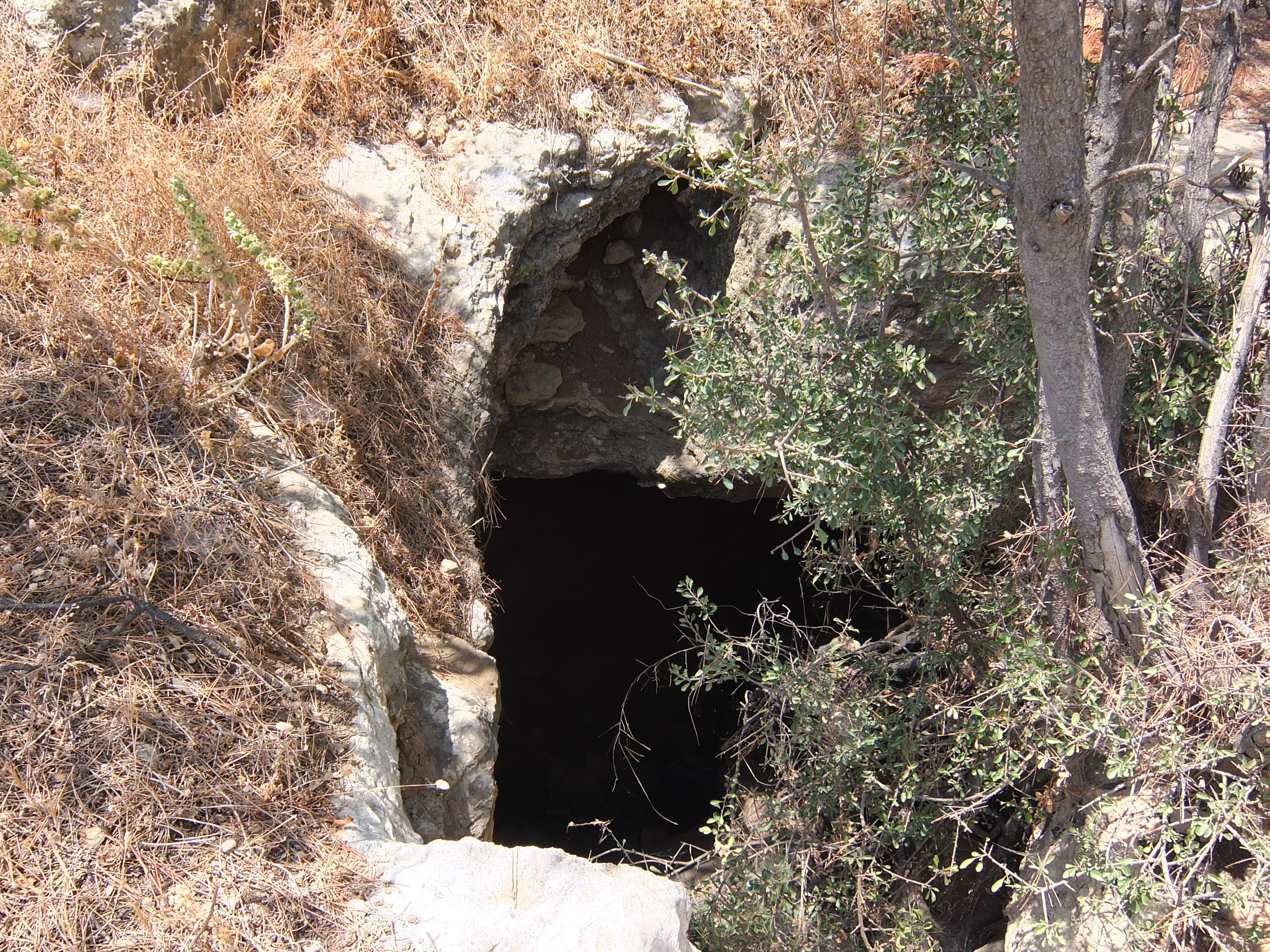
Cave in the vicinity of Jarash

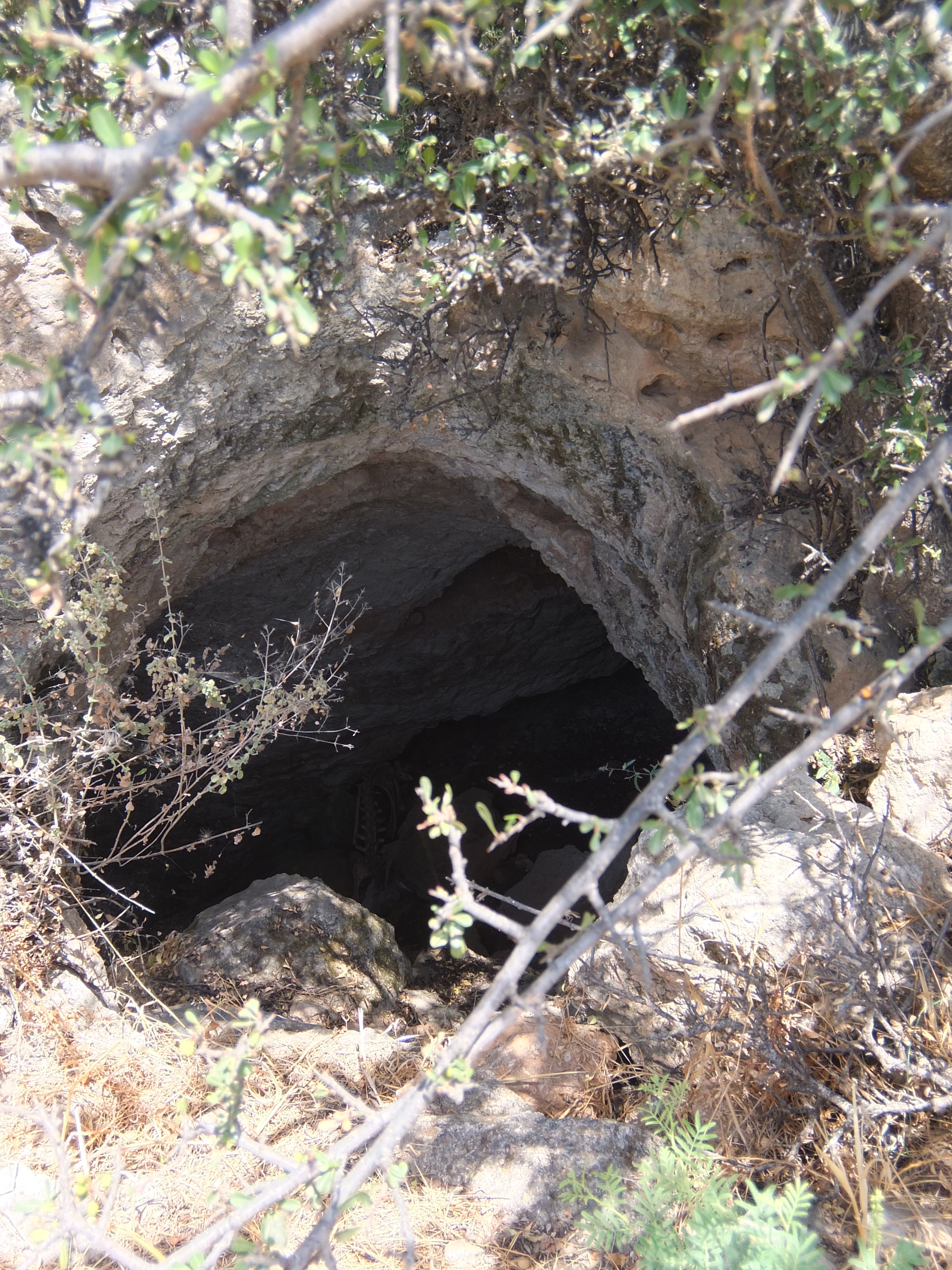
Near Jarash, a cave bearing a human skeleton

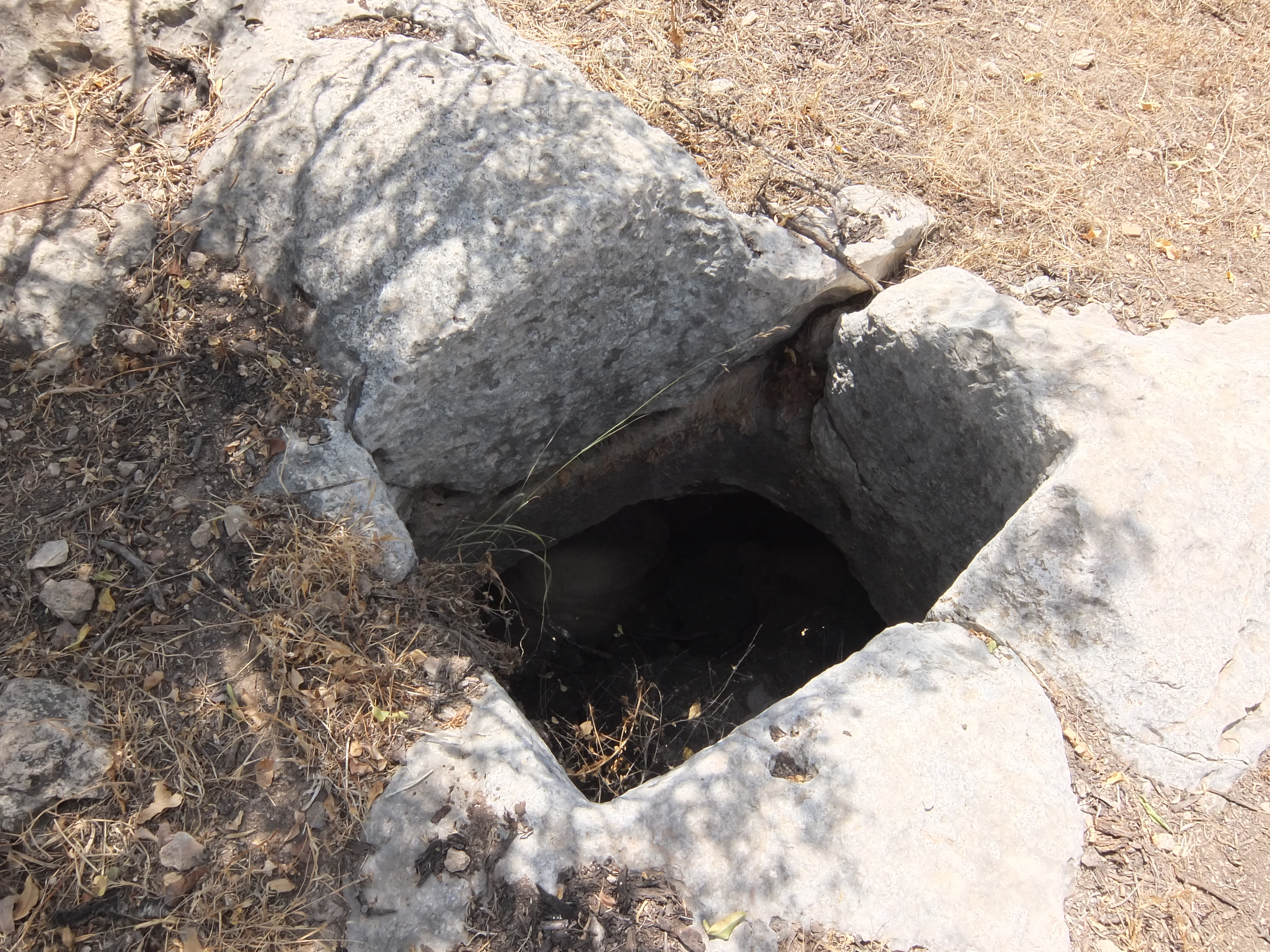
Rock-cut cistern near Jarash

== See also ==
- Depopulated Palestinian locations in Israel
- List of villages depopulated during the Arab-Israeli conflict

== Bibliography ==
- Barron, J. B., ed. (1923). Palestine: Report and General Abstracts of the Census of 1922. Government of Palestine.
- Conder, C.R.; Kitchener, H. H. (1883). The Survey of Western Palestine: Memoirs of the Topography, Orography, Hydrography, and Archaeology. Vol. 3. London: Committee of the Palestine Exploration Fund.
- Department of Statistics (1945). Village Statistics, April, 1945. Government of Palestine.
- Guérin, V. (1869). Description Géographique Historique et Archéologique de la Palestine (in French). Vol. 1: Judee, pt. 3. Paris: L'Imprimerie Nationale.
- Hadawi, S. (1970). Village Statistics of 1945: A Classification of Land and Area ownership in Palestine. Palestine Liberation Organization Research Center.
- Hartmann, M. (1883). "Die Ortschaftenliste des Liwa Jerusalem in dem türkischen Staatskalender für Syrien auf das Jahr 1288 der Flucht (1871)". Zeitschrift des Deutschen Palästina-Vereins. 6: 102–149.
- Hütteroth, W.-D.; Abdulfattah, K. (1977). Historical Geography of Palestine, Transjordan and Southern Syria in the Late 16th Century. Erlanger Geographische Arbeiten, Sonderband 5. Erlangen, Germany: Vorstand der Fränkischen Geographischen Gesellschaft. ISBN 3-920405-41-2.
- Khalidi, W. (1992). All That Remains: The Palestinian Villages Occupied and Depopulated by Israel in 1948. Washington D.C.: Institute for Palestine Studies. ISBN 0-88728-224-5.
- Mills, E., ed. (1932). Census of Palestine 1931. Population of Villages, Towns and Administrative Areas. Jerusalem: Government of Palestine.
- Morris, B. (2004). The Birth of the Palestinian Refugee Problem Revisited. Cambridge University Press. ISBN 978-0-521-00967-6.
- Palmer, E. H. (1881). The Survey of Western Palestine: Arabic and English Name Lists Collected During the Survey by Lieutenants Conder and Kitchener, R. E. Transliterated and Explained by E.H. Palmer. Committee of the Palestine Exploration Fund.
- Robinson, E.; Smith, E. (1841). Biblical Researches in Palestine, Mount Sinai and Arabia Petraea: A Journal of Travels in the year 1838. Vol. 2. Boston: Crocker & Brewster.
- Robinson, E.; Smith, E. (1841). Biblical Researches in Palestine, Mount Sinai and Arabia Petraea: A Journal of Travels in the year 1838. Vol. 3. Boston: Crocker & Brewster.
- Schick, C. (1896). "Zur Einwohnerzahl des Bezirks Jerusalem". Zeitschrift des Deutschen Palästina-Vereins. 19: 120–127.
- Socin, A. (1879). "Alphabetisches Verzeichniss von Ortschaften des Paschalik Jerusalem". Zeitschrift des Deutschen Palästina-Vereins. 2: 135–163.
- Zissu, Boaz (2007). "The Identification of the Settlement 'Gerasa' in Judea". Judea and Samaria Research Studies. 16. Ariel: 219–230.
