= Tzur Hadassah =

Tzur Hadassah צור הדסה
- Local council
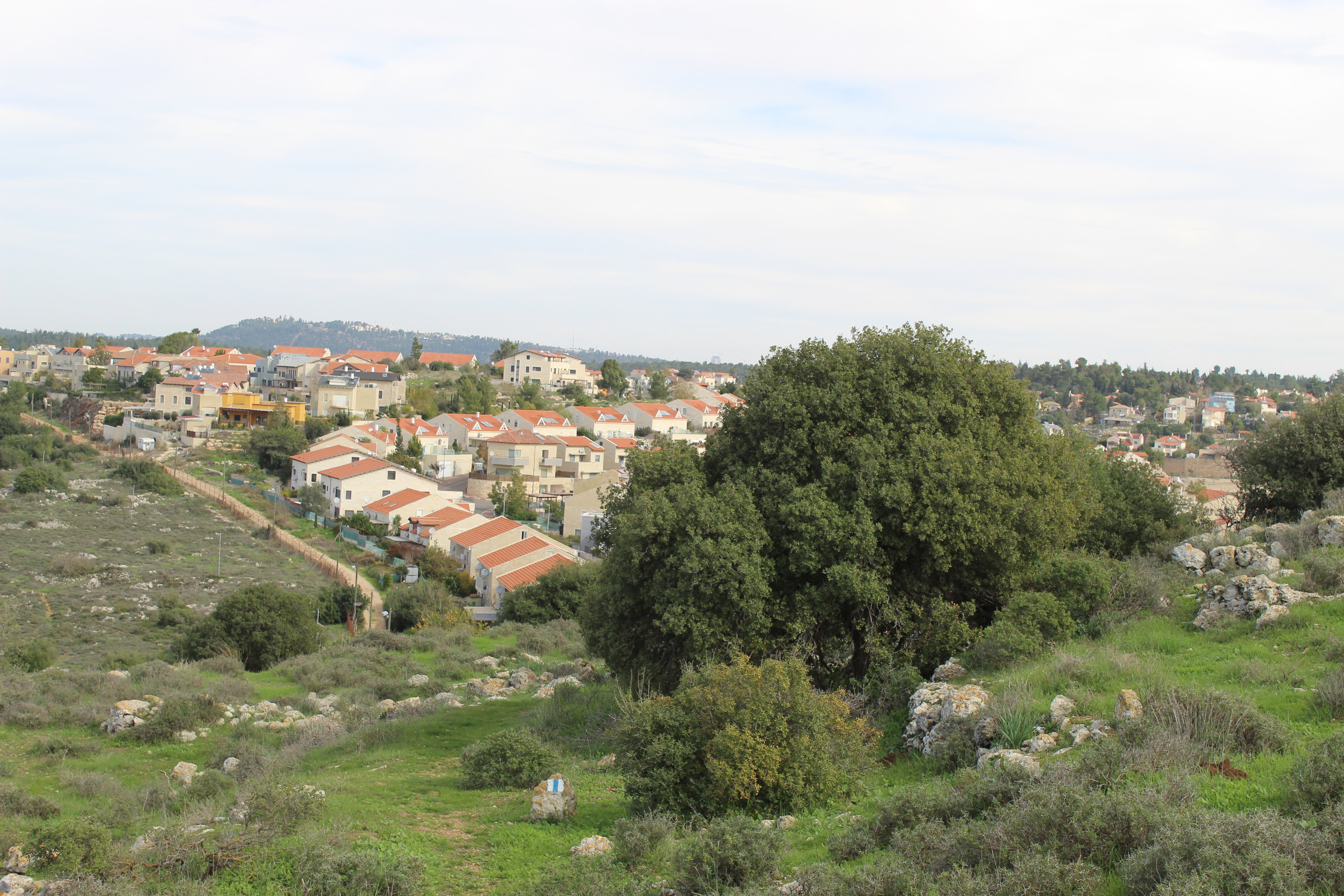
- View of Tzur Hadassah

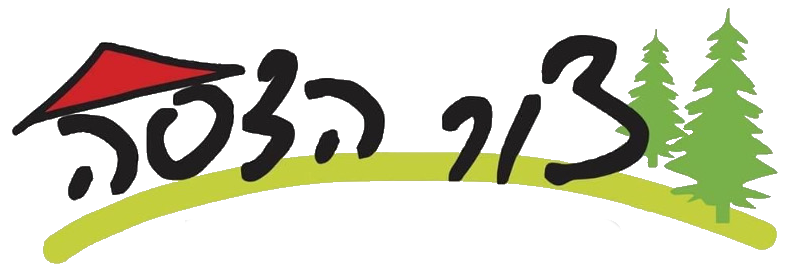
- Coat of arms

- Location within Jerusalem District Location within Israel
- Coordinates: 31°43′3″N 35°5′38″E
- Country: Israel
- District: Jerusalem
- Natural Region: Judean Mountains
- Founded: 1960

Government
  - Head of Municipality: Tomer Moskowitz

Population (2024)
  - Total: 10,459
- Name meaning: Rock of Hadassah
- Website: www.tzur-hadassa.org.il

Tzur Hadassah (Hebrew: צור הדסה, lit. 'Rock of Hadassah') is a town located in the Jerusalem Corridor, located 12 kilometres (7.5 mi) southwest of Jerusalem, at an altitude of 755 meters above sea level, located on Route 375 west of Beitar Illit, adjacent to the West Bank village of Wadi Fukin across the Green Line. In 2024 it had a population of 10,459.

== History ==
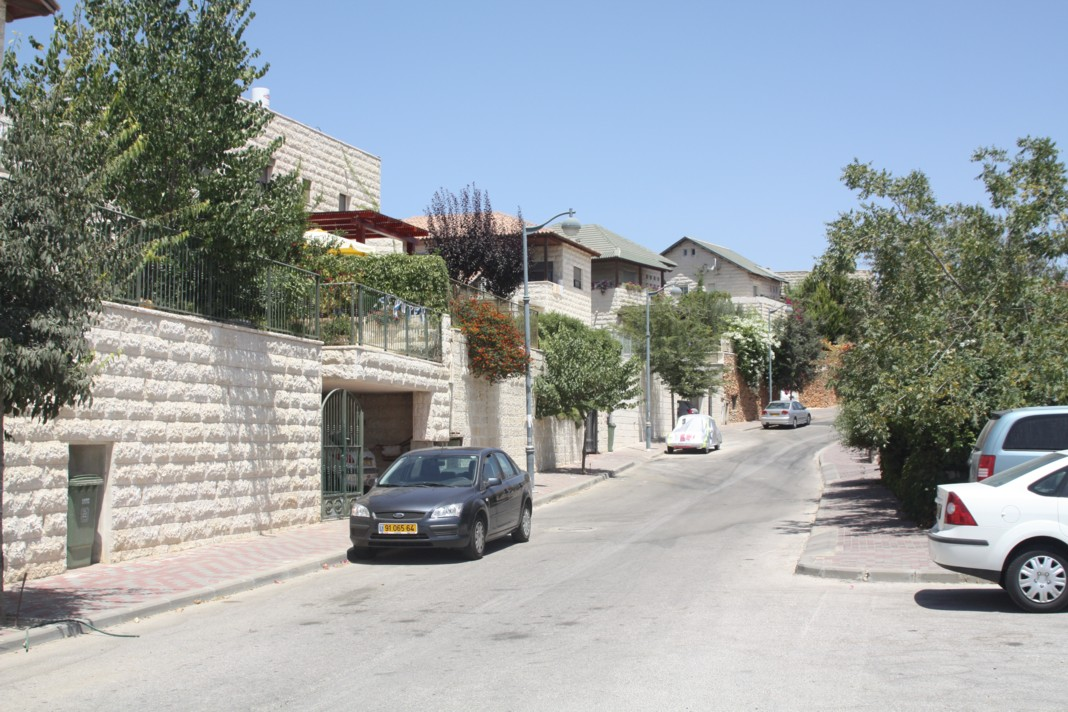
Street in Tzur Hadassah

Tzur Hadassah was established in 1956 as a regional centre for nearby moshavim such as Bar Giora, Mata, Mevo Beitar and Nes Harim. It is located on the land of the depopulated Palestinian village of Ras Abu 'Ammar. It was named for the Hadassah organization.

The town has four neighborhoods: The "Vatika" (Old Tzur Hadassah and Shehunat HaMeah); New Tzur Hadassah (Shehunat HaEmek); Sansan (Sansan Mt.); and Har Kitron (Kitron Mt.) which forms the second half of the horseshoe topography of Tzur Hadassah. In 2016, plans for expansion were approved to add 15,000 new residents within 5 years.

In 2023, Tzur Hadassah became a local council and Tomer Moskowitz was appointed mayor.

== Education ==
Tzur Hadassah is home to 4 primary schools, 1 religious, 1 mixed, and 2 secular. The religious school is called Lavi, the mixed (both religious and secular) is Maayanot, and the secular primary schools are Hadassim and Tzurim. Hadassa is home to Kehilat Shir Chadash (formally Kehilat Tzur Hadassah).

The Kehila has an active chapter of the Israeli Reform Youth Movement Noar Telem. The congregation plays a leading role in the town's social and cultural life. Between 2006-2014 rabbi Ofer Beit-Halachmi got the congregation into a new building and created a moving voice in the community, leading in projects such as environmental programs, teen programs, and civic engagement such as volunteering in immigrant communities.

== Landmarks ==
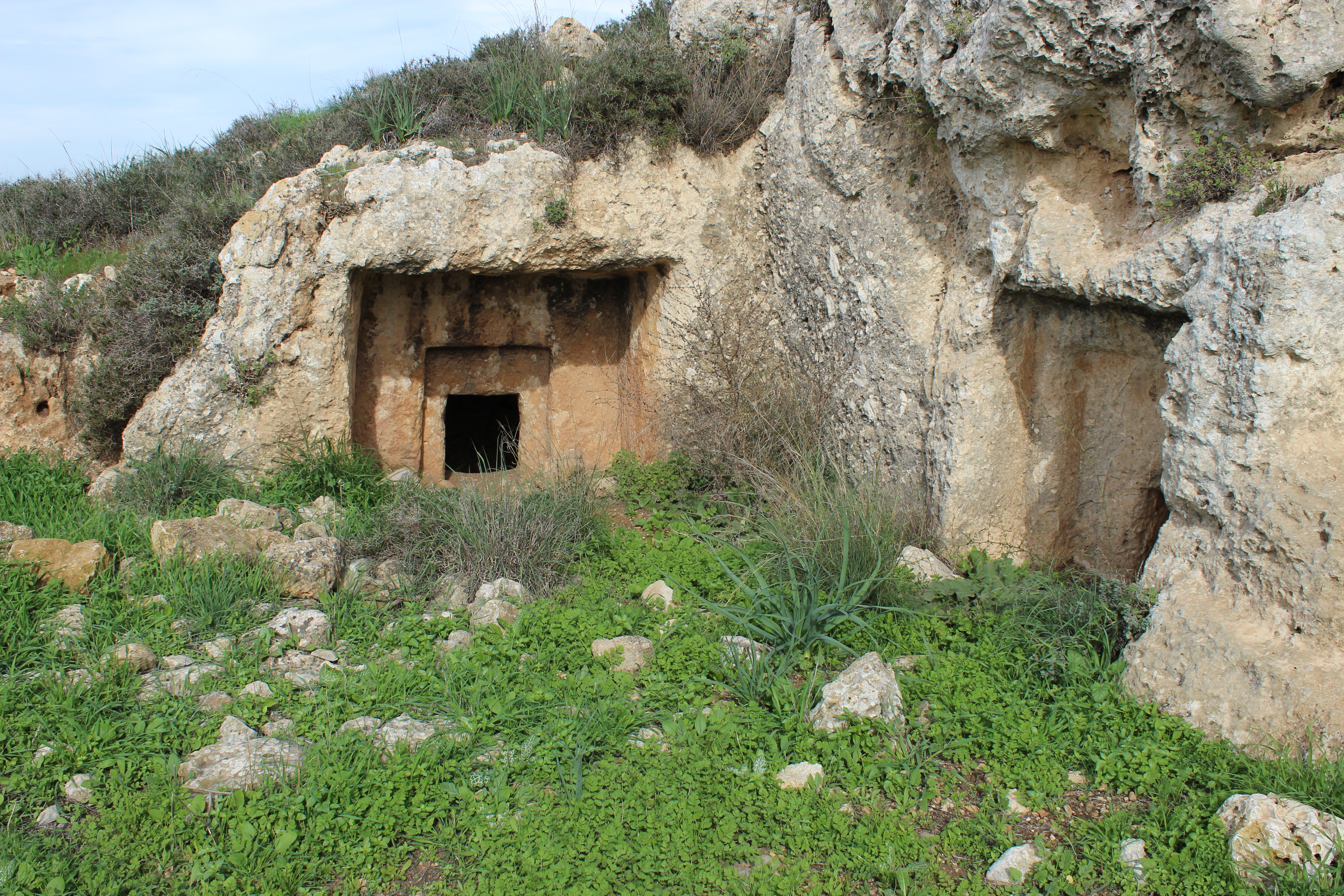
Khirbet Jurish

The Harei Yehuda riding stable is located in Tzur Hadassah, at the edge of the Sansan nature reserve. It was established in 1991 in the old part of Tzur Hadassah and moved to new facilities in 2004. The Israel National Trail, marked with orange, blue, and white stripes, reaches Tzur Hadassah on its way westward. In 2014, construction workers discovered a large stalactite cave located beneath parts of Tzur Hadassah, the Parks Service sealed off entrance to the cave system.

== Voting Patterns ==
In the 2022 election, 53 percent of voters in Tzur Hadassah voted for the parties of the center-left coalition led by Yair Lapid, while 41 percent voted for the parties of the right-wing coalition led by Benjamin Netanyahu and 0.5 percent voted for the Arab parties.

In the 2026 election, 53 percent of voters in Tzur Hadassah voted for the parties of the center-left coalition led by Gadi Eisenkot, while 36 percent voted for the parties of the right-wing coalition led by Benjamin Netanyahu and 0.5 percent voted for the Arab parties. An additional 6.2 percent voted for the Reservists, and 3.8 percent voted for Amcha Yisrael. Voter turnout increased 10 percent from the 2022 election.
