= Khirbet Jurish =

Archaeological ruin southeast of Jerusalem

- Hurvat Geres
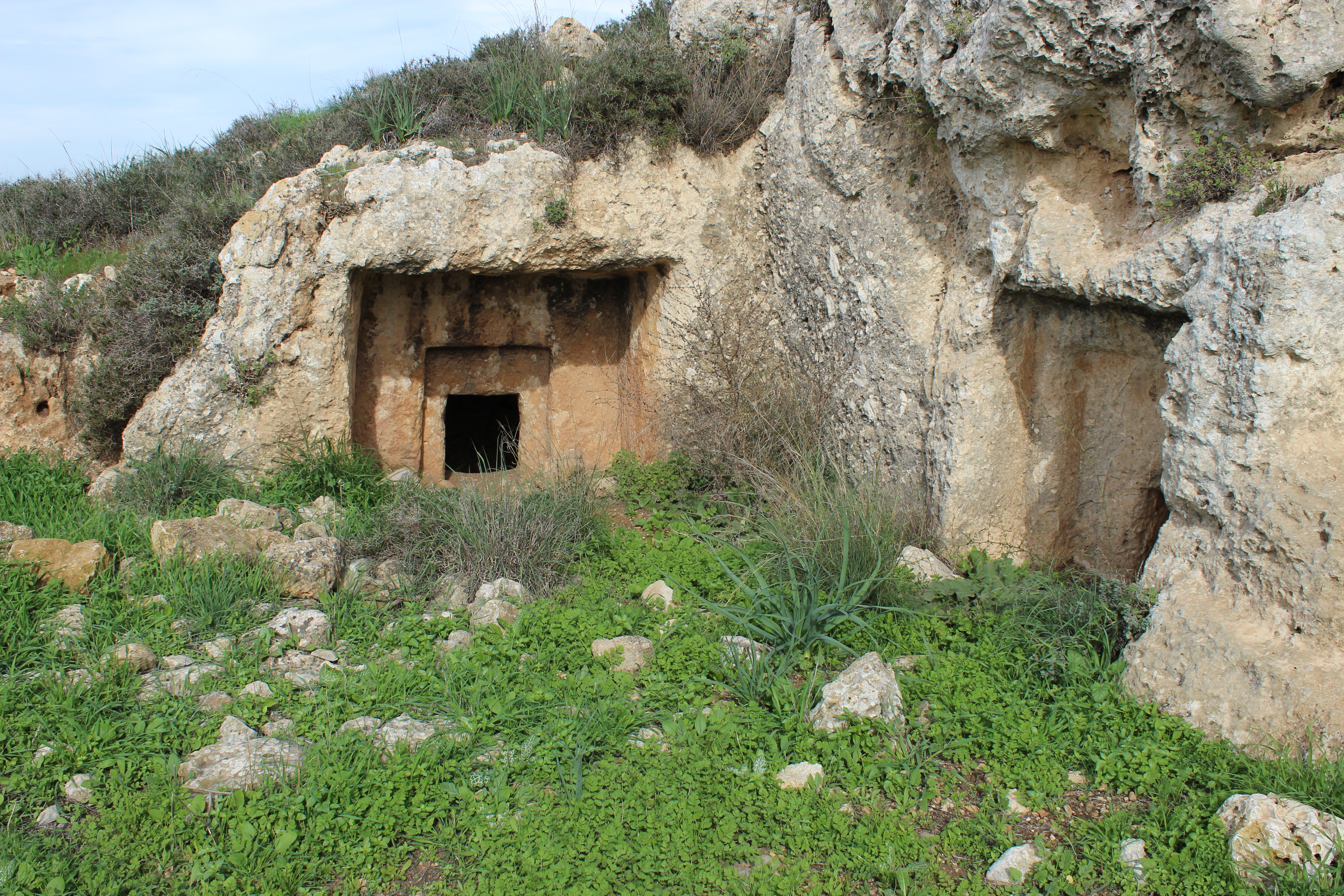
- Tombs at Khirbet Jurish
- Interactive map of Khirbet Jurish
- Nearest city: Tzur Hadassa
- Coordinates: 31°42′55″N 35°05′1″E
- Established: Hellenistic period

Khirbet Jurish (Heb. Hurvat Geres) is an archaeological site 30 kilometres (19 mi) southwest of Jerusalem. At the site that is protected by the Israel Nature and Parks Authority remains of a Jewish village were found, dating to the Second Temple period, specifically from 100 BCE till 70 CE.. The ruins of the site stand on a hill to the west of Tzur Hadassa, on a mountain now called Har Kitron, along regional highway 375.

== Description ==
The site, surveyed by archaeologist Boaz Zissu on behalf of the Israel Antiquities Authority, covers an area of about 40 dunams (9.8 acres) and sits at an elevation of 751 metres (2,464 ft) above sea-level. The ruin lay adjacent to the old Jerusalem-Beit Gubrin Roman road, and was visited by PEF explorers, Conder and Kitchener. Three or four miqva'ot have been discovered on the site, attesting to it being an ancient Jewish settlement. The site also contains a large bottle-shaped cistern, with a depth of about 6 meters, and a bottom measuring 4.3 x 4.7 meters. Potsherds found on the site have been dated back to the Hellenistic, early Roman, and Byzantine periods. On the western slope of the ruin are five rock-carved sepulchres, attesting to the site's antiquity.

== See also ==
- Gerasa (Judaea)
- Khirbet Kurkush
- Kidron Valley
- Mokata 'Abud

== Gallery ==
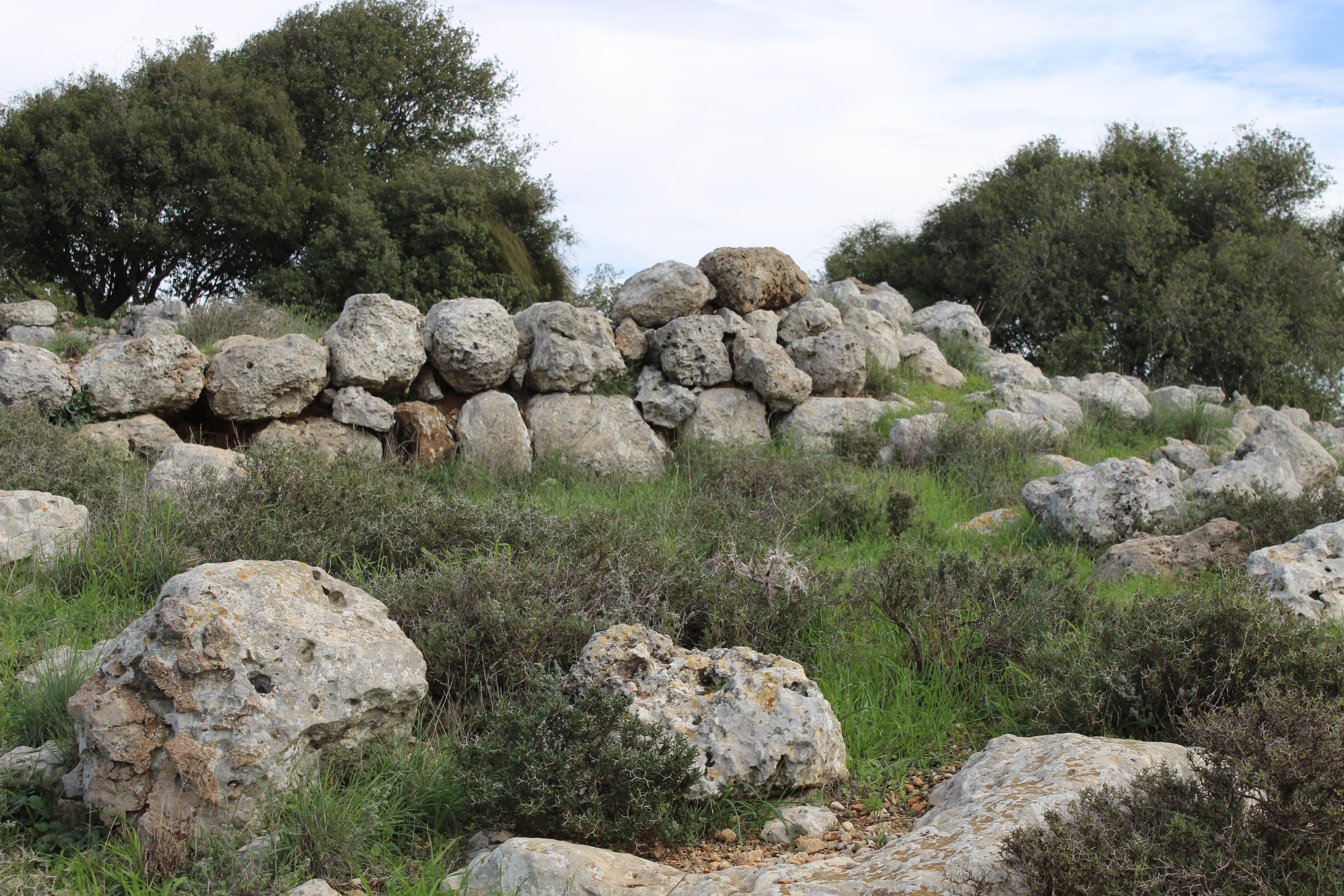
Stone wall at Khirbet Jurish

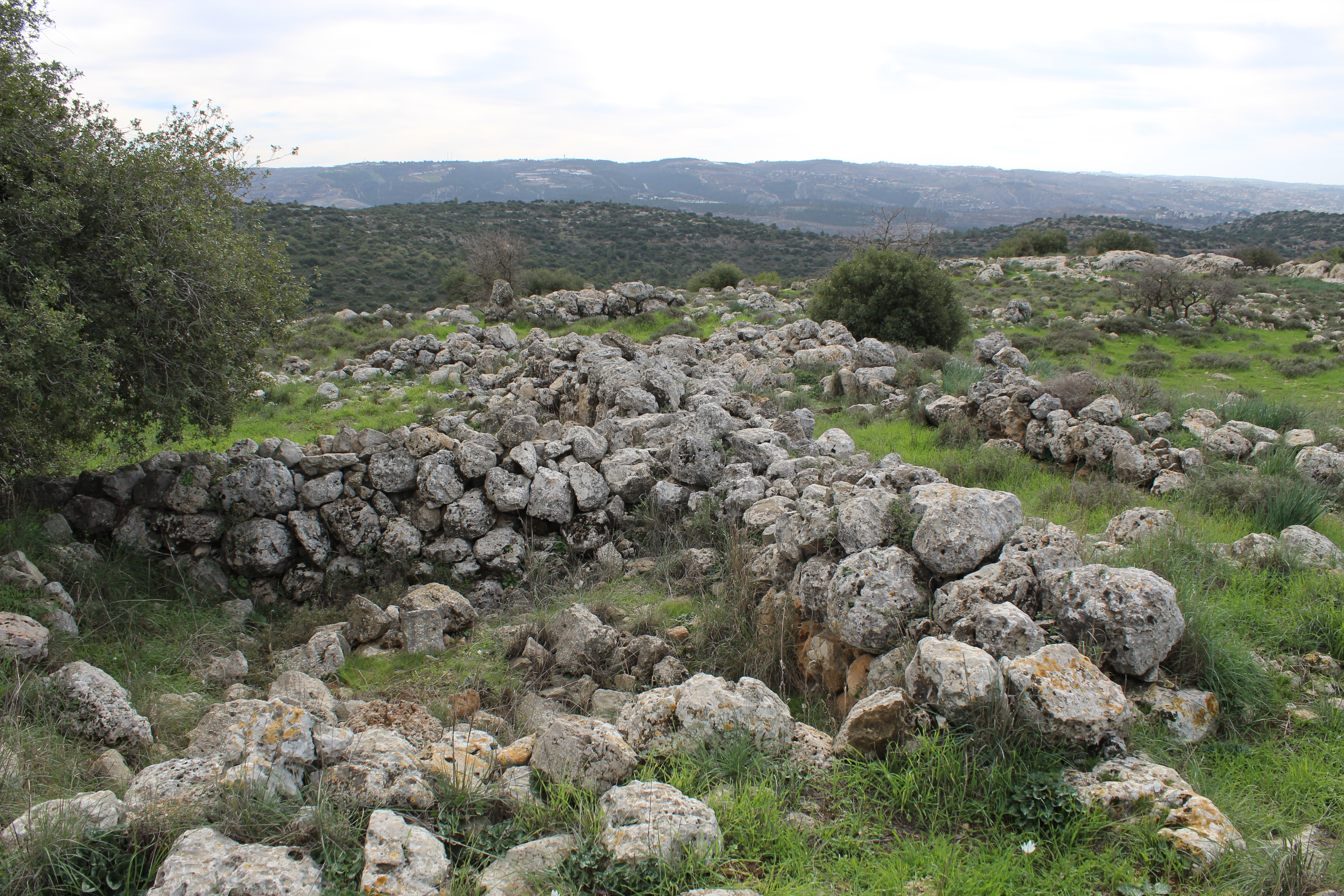
General view of ruins at Kh. Jurish

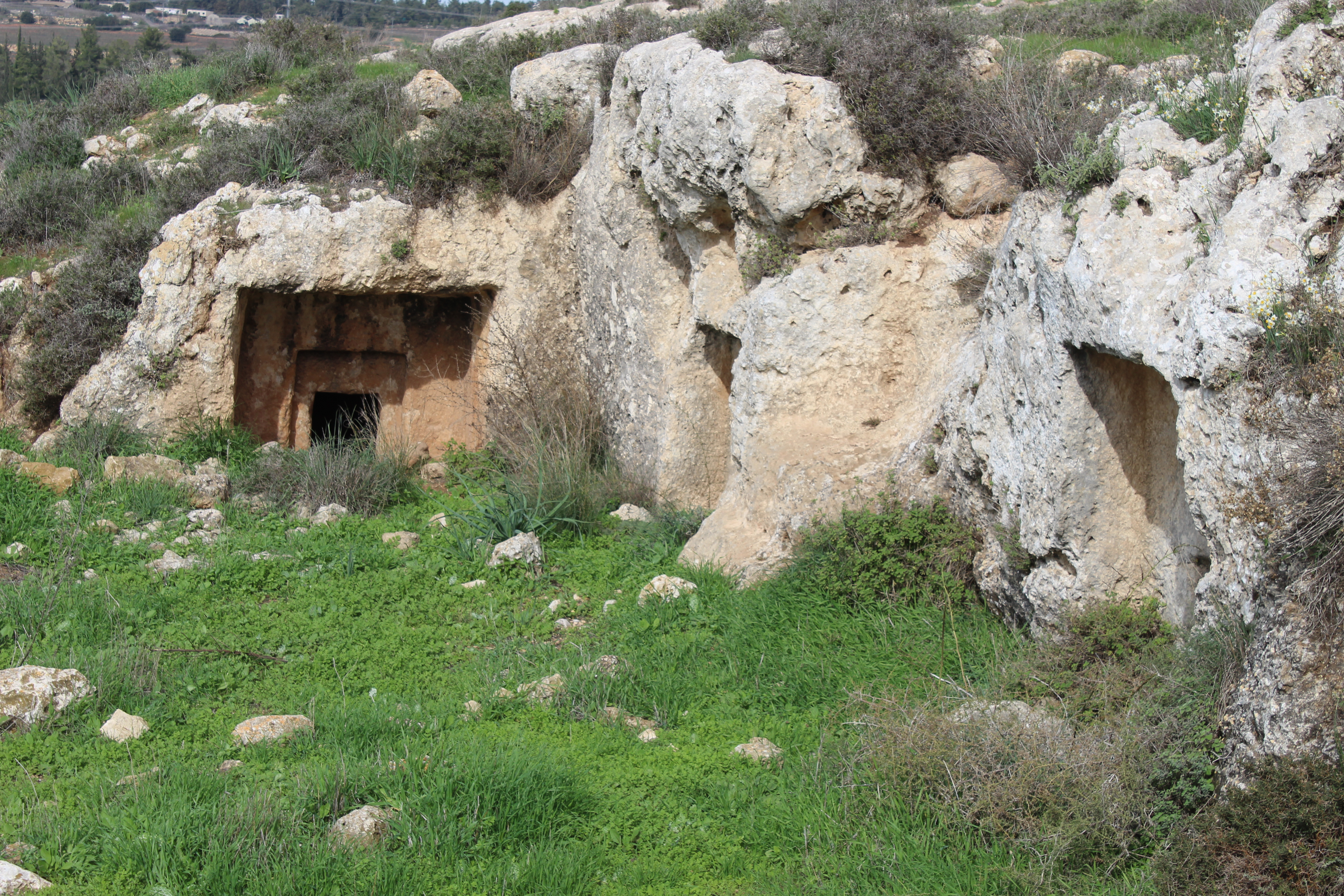
Burial chambers, cut in rock at Kh. Jurish

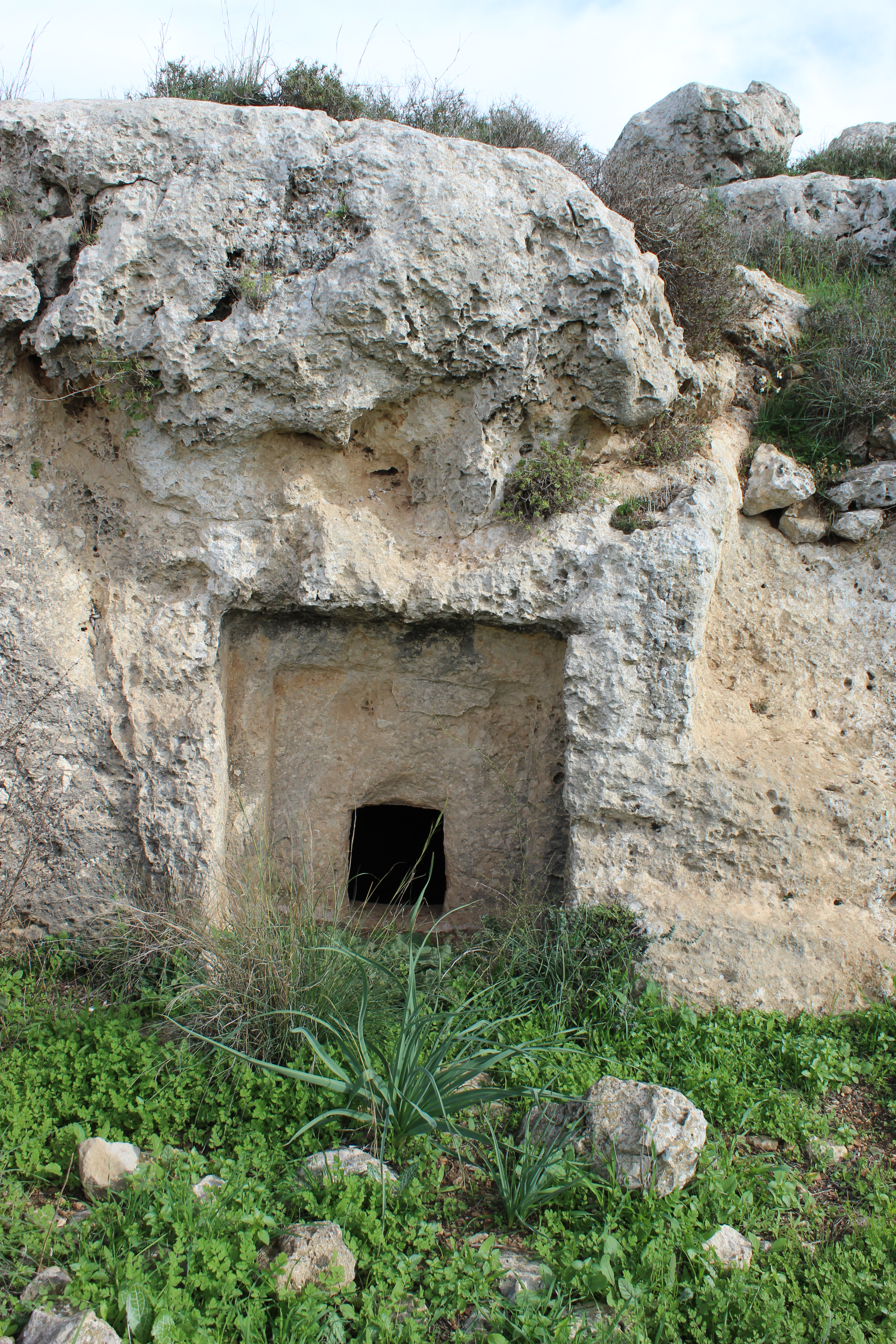
Tomb at Ruin Jurish

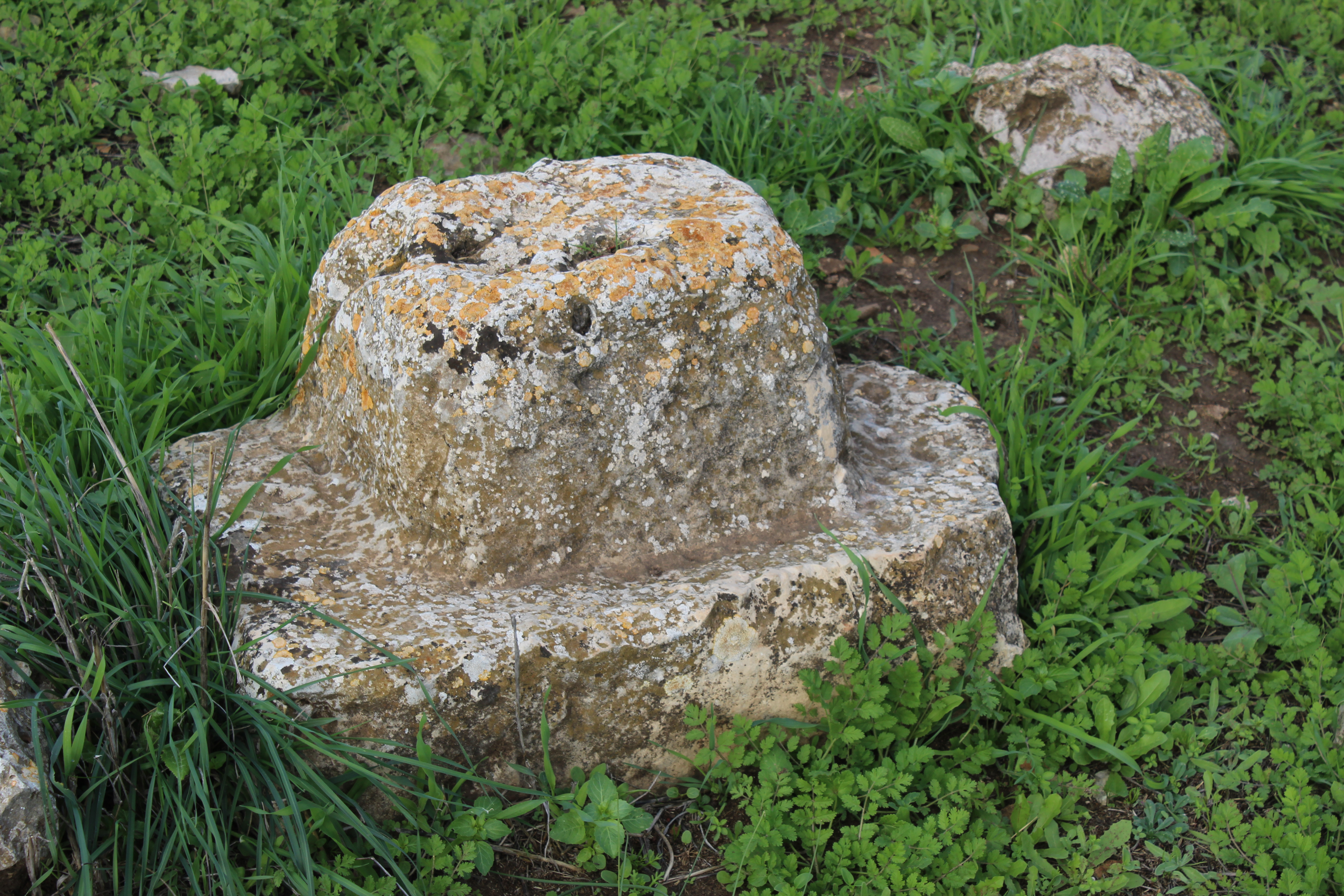
Burial stone used to cover entrance to burial cave

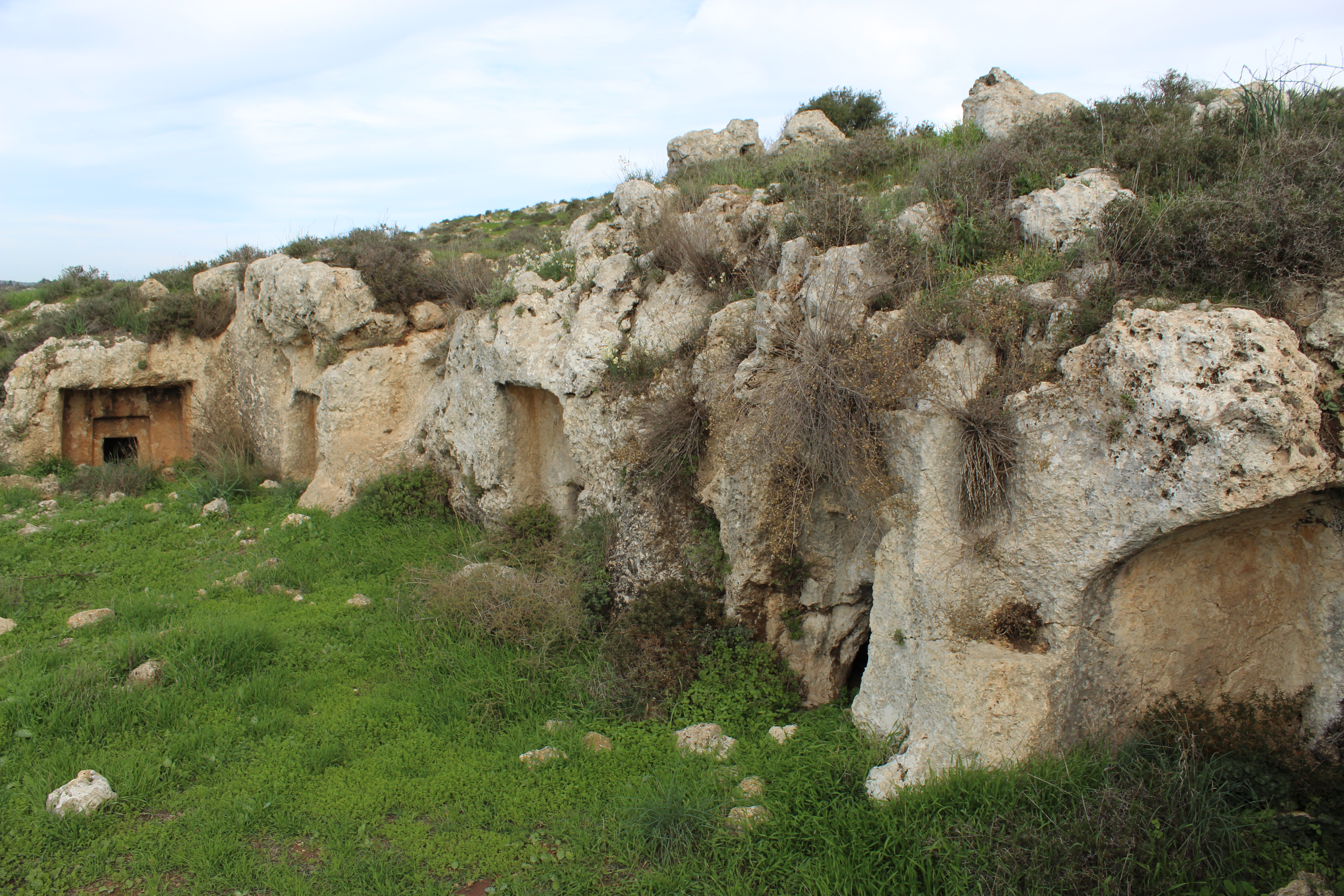
Burial chambers in Kh. Jurish

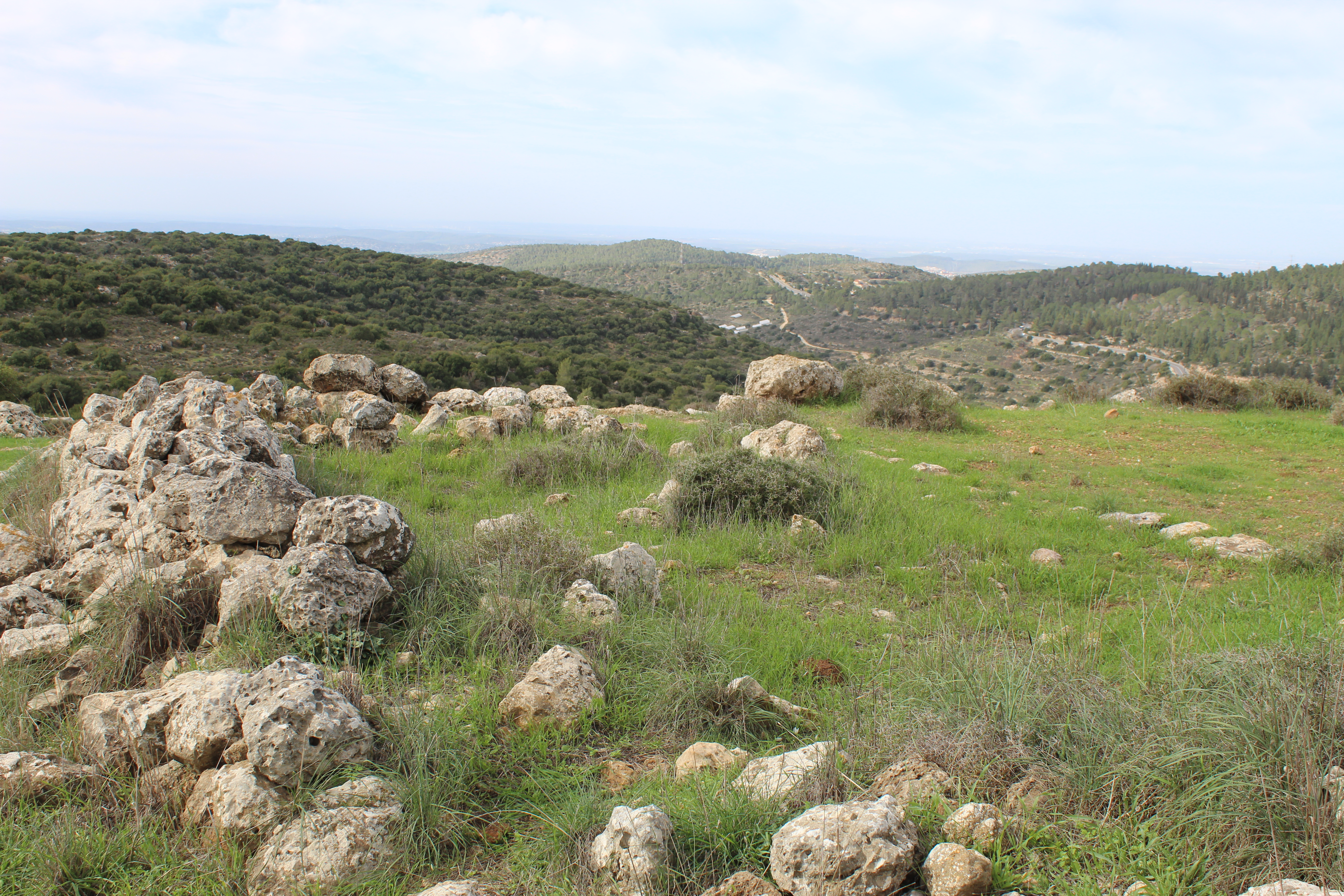
Ruin of Jurish

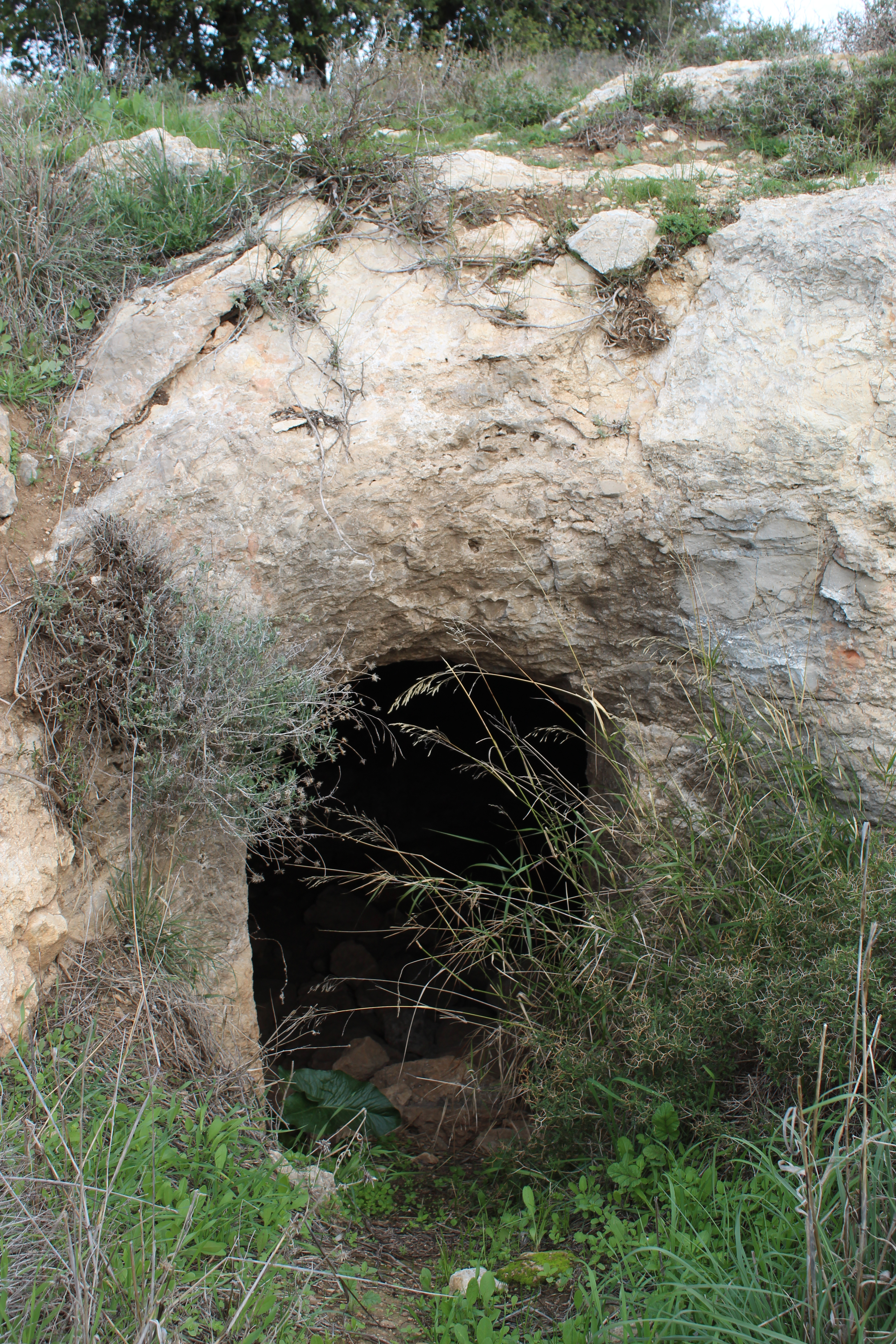
Cave dwelling

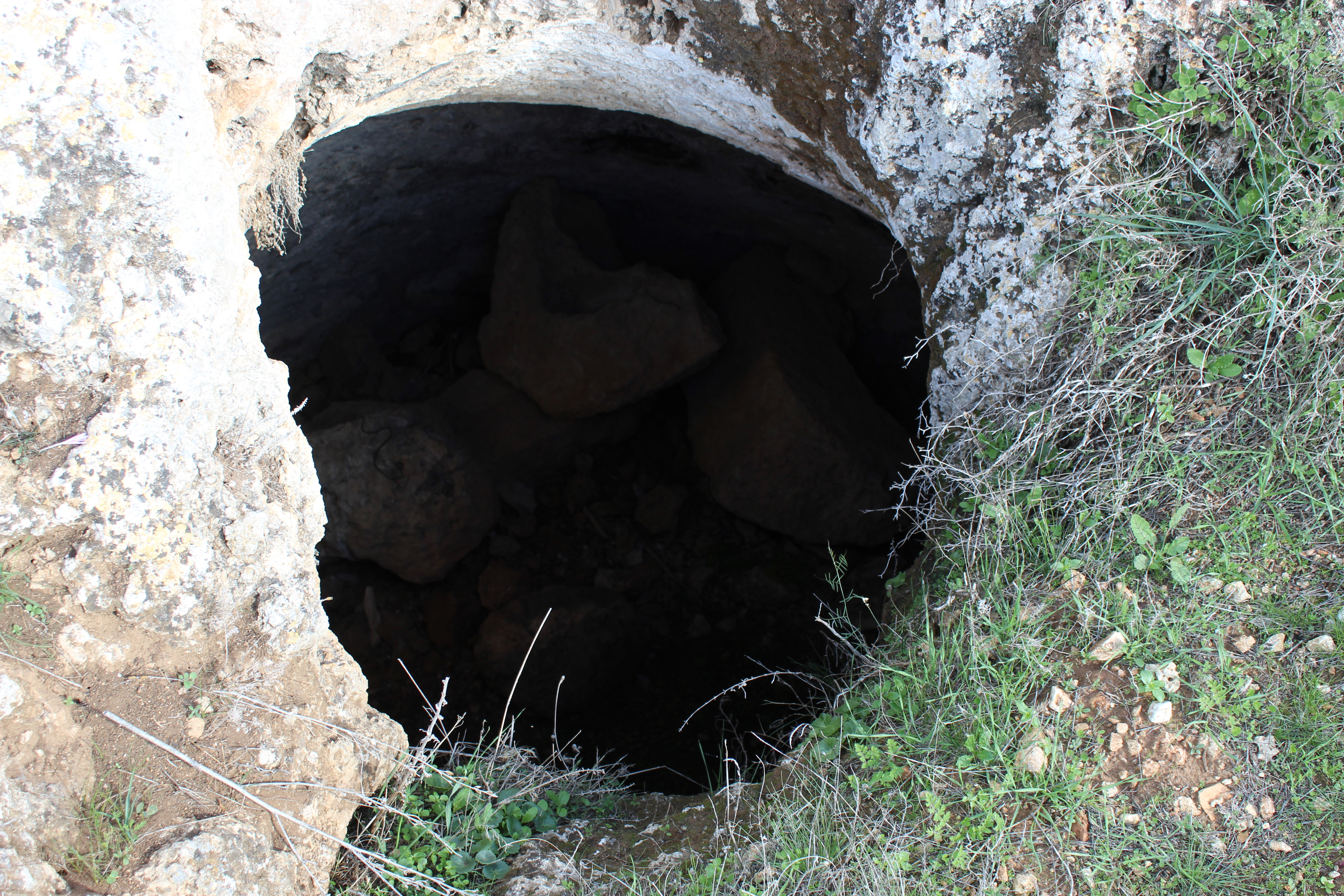
Cistern at Khirbet Jurish

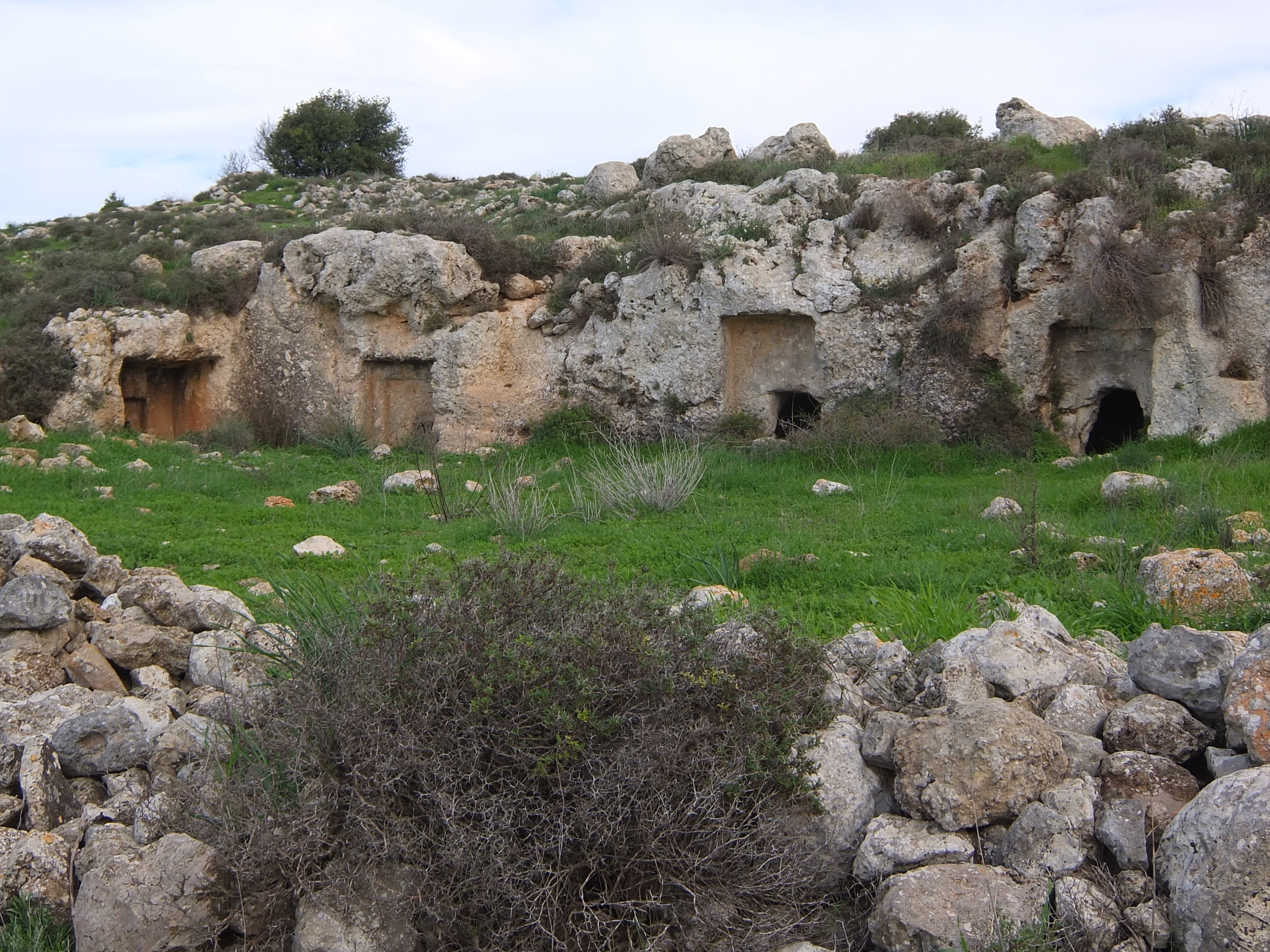
Rock-cut tombs

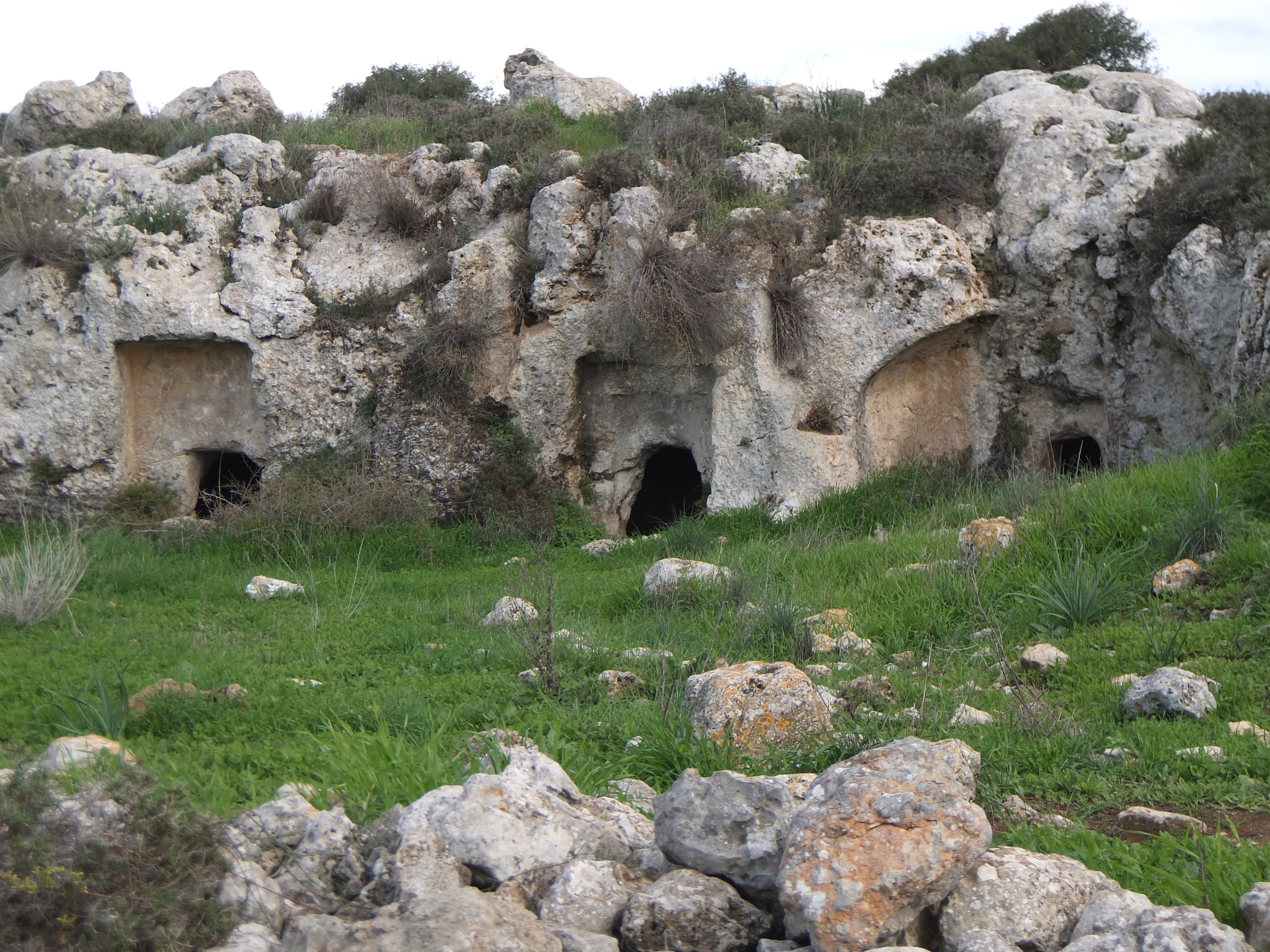
Burial tombs

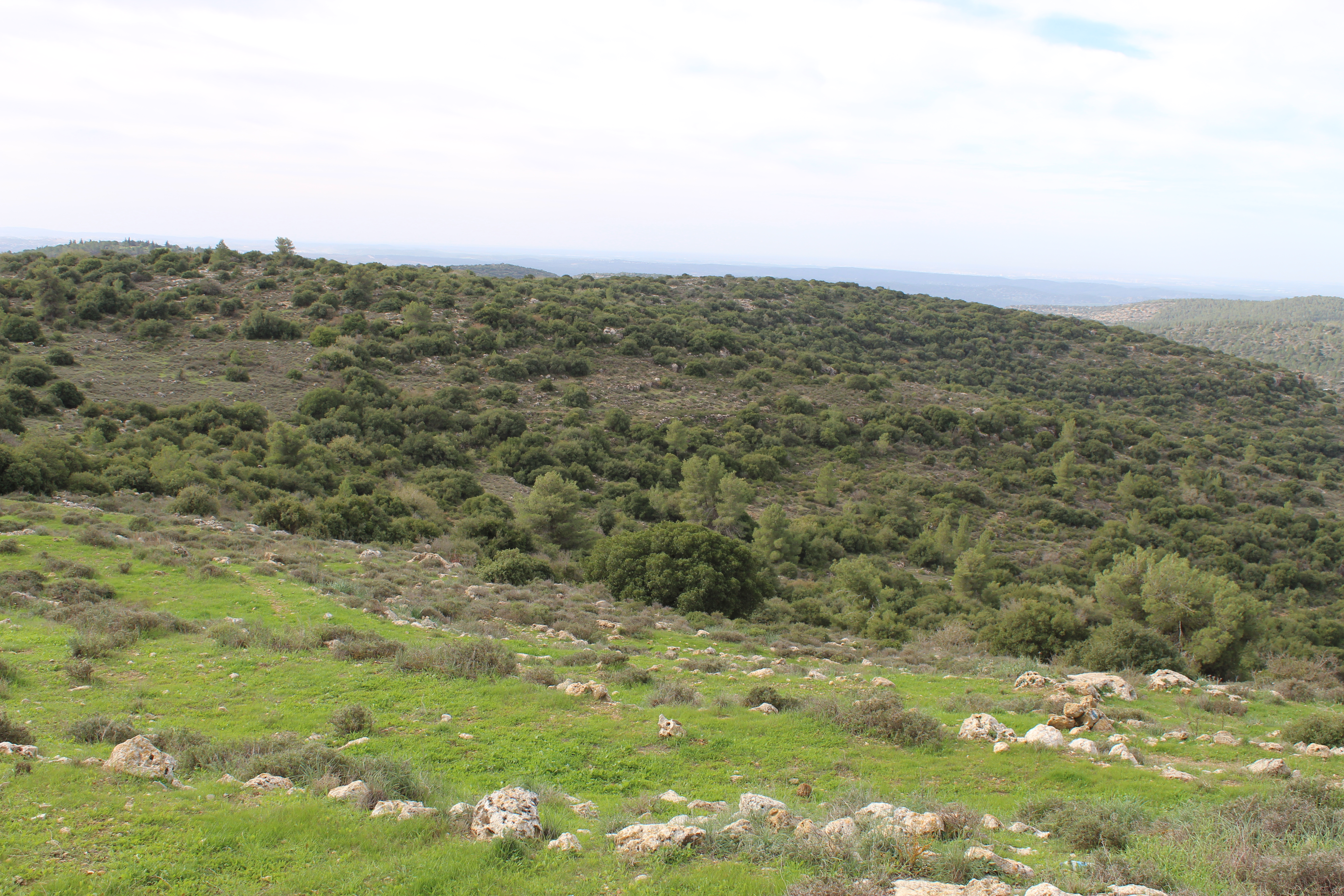
View looking west from Khirbet Jurish

== Bibliography ==
- Conder, C.R.; Kitchener, H.H. (1883). The Survey of Western Palestine: Memoirs of the Topography, Orography, Hydrography, and Archaeology. Vol. 3. London: Committee of the Palestine Exploration Fund.
- Palmer, E.H. (1881). The Survey of Western Palestine: Arabic and English Name Lists Collected During the Survey by Lieutenants Conder and Kitchener, R. E. Transliterated and Explained by E.H. Palmer. Committee of the Palestine Exploration Fund.
- Zissu, Boaz (2007). Ya'acov Eshel (ed.). "Excavations and Surveys - Identification of Gerasa in Judea". Judea and Samaria Research Studies (in Hebrew). 16. Ariel: 219–231.
