= Disused train stations from Mandatory Palestine =

Abandoned Palestinian Train Stations

The railway network in what is now Israel and Palestine started in 1890 with the construction of the Jaffa–Jerusalem railway in the Mutasarrifate of Jerusalem, part of the Ottoman Empire. It was expanded, connected with the Hejaz railway, and then the British Sinai Military Railway when the British Empire took over the region during the First World War. Over the course of the 20th century, many tracks and stations ceased to be operational. In some cases this was due to the Partition of Palestine, severing stations from their communities and tracks from stations. In other cases, Arab or Jewish nationalists sabotaged stations for political goals.

While Palestine Railways had the greatest ratio of tracks per capita in the middle east at the start of the First World War, use of the railway system declined in Israel between the 1960s and 1990s due to a lack of investment, and was practically non-existent in Jordanian and Egyptian controlled Palestinian territories, with Jordan actively destroying tracks, and some sources saying that Palestinian leadership did as well.

Today, Israel Railways runs rail services inside the green line, and there are no rail services in the West Bank or Gaza. Plans to build transit in Palestinian territories have been proposed (between Israeli settlements, and also between Palestinian towns like Jenin, Nablus, and Ramallah, with future service to Gaza), but have been condemned by Palestinian human rights activists and governments. Separate plans have been proposed by the Palestinian authority.

Many stations have been abandoned, disused, or reassigned to other purposes. Rebuilding ruined stations and opening historic has been a goal of both Israelis and Palestinians.

Map of Israeli-Palestinian railways

== Jerusalem District ==
=== Battir Station ===
Battir Station
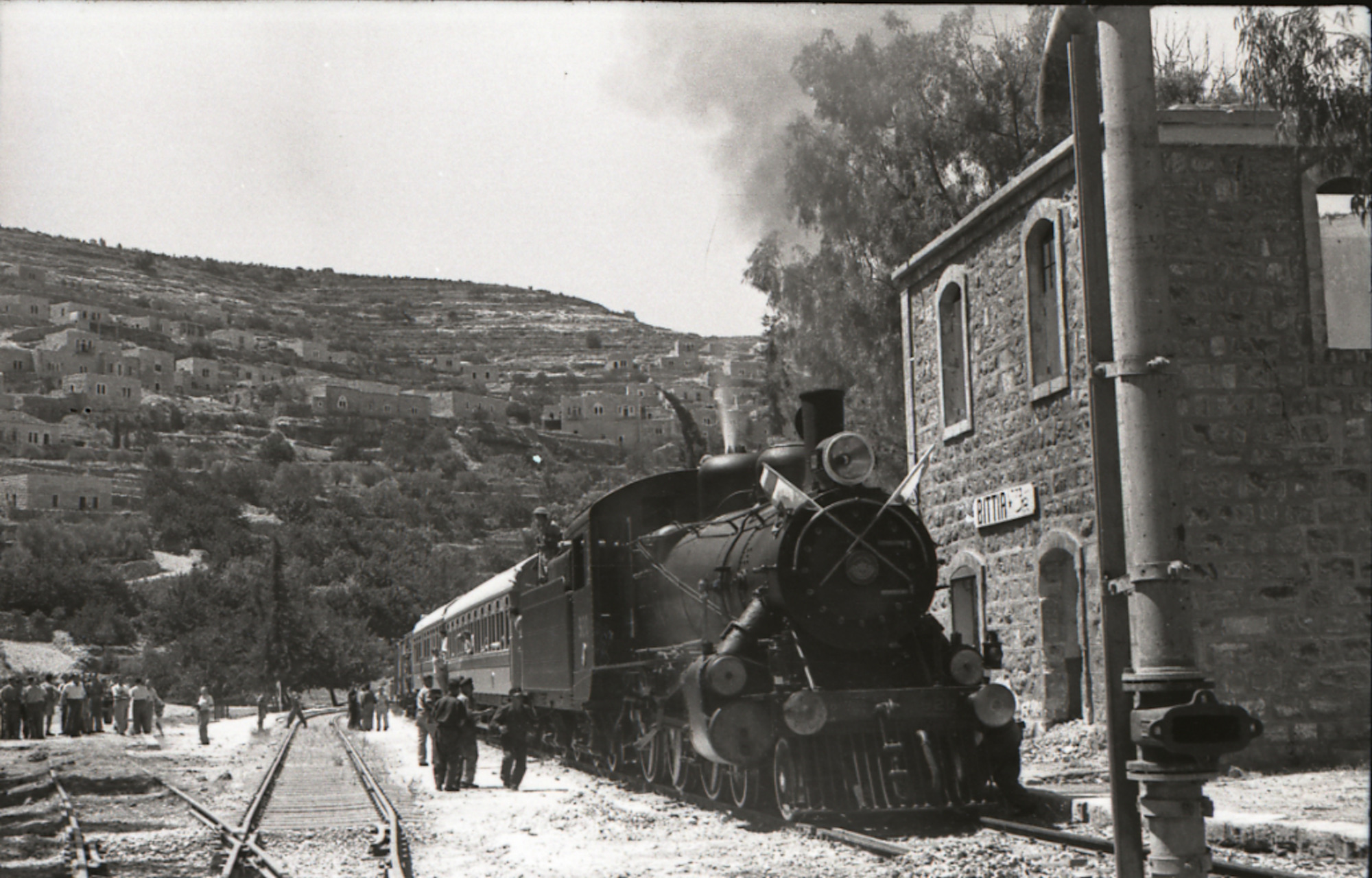
- Train leaving Battir station to Jerusalem after War of Independence

بتير תחנת בתיר

Details
- In operation: 1892–1998
- Location: Near Battir; 31°43′58″N 35°08′32″E
- Line: Jaffa–Jerusalem railway
- Communities served: Battir
- Operated By: Hejaz railway Palestine Railways; Israel Railways

The station was on the edge of the village of Battir, in the Jerusalem district, and nicknamed "el Bakhri" ("the ship").

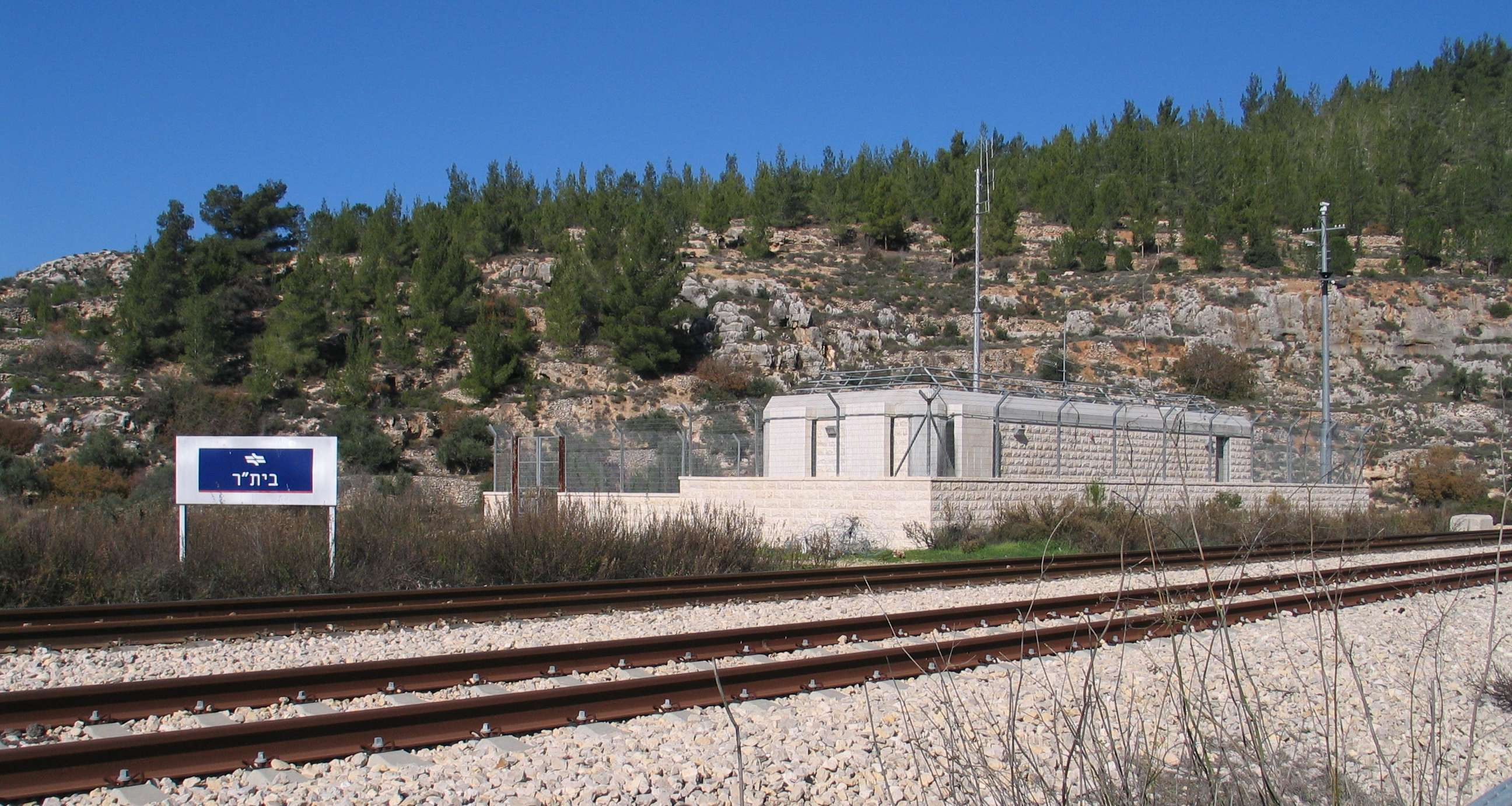
Beitar station (2014)

The station brought an economic boom to the village to the point that Battir was known as the "vegetable basket of Jerusalem", and was the primary way of getting goods in and out of the settlement. It also hosted an unofficial farmers market for passengers while the train was refueling. It had a water and coal filling station, and supplied water to the Jerusalem station. It was captured by British troops on 27 November 1917, and the site of negotiations between villagers and Israeli military leadership after on 2 May 1949.

=== Jerusalem Station ===
The Jerusalem railway station was built by the Ottoman Empire in 1892, and was operated by the Ottomans, the British Mandate, and the Israeli Rail systems. It was closed in 1998, and transformed into an entertainment space in 2013. A new subterranean station at the same site, Jerusalem-Khan, is expected to be operational by 2030.

=== Deir es Sheik (Bar Giora) Station ===
Deir es Sheik Station
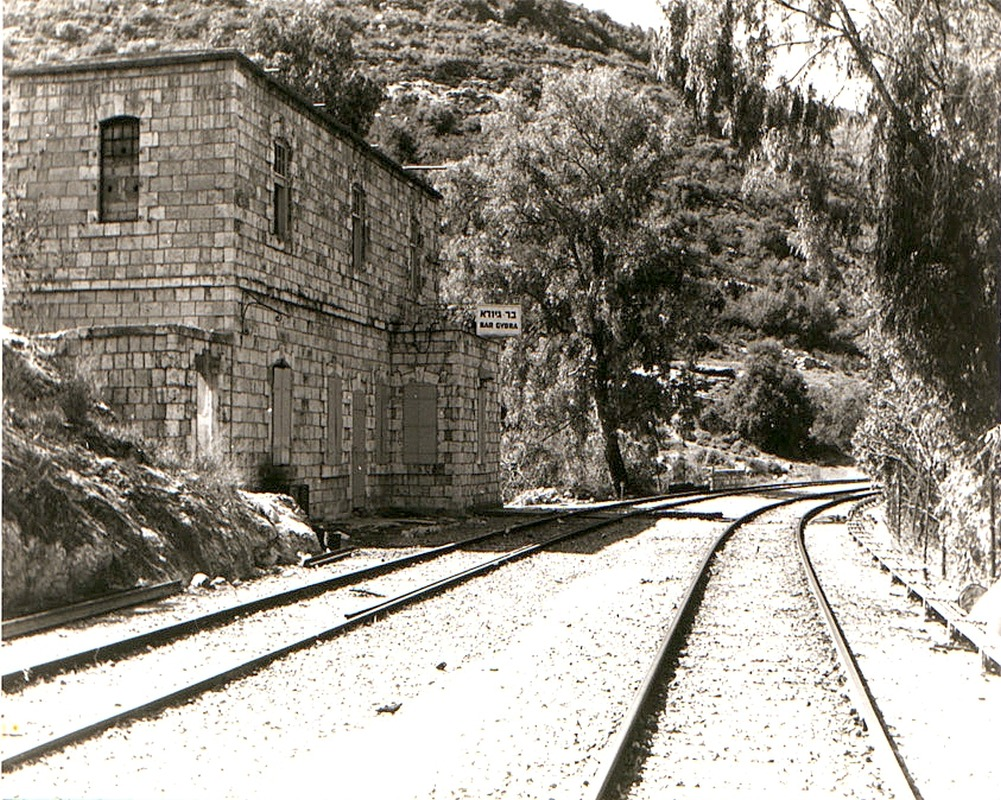
- Deir es Sheik train station in the 1940s

دير الشيخ תחנת הרכבת בר גיורא

Details
- In operation: 1892–1998
- Location: Near Hartuv; 31°44′52″N 35°04′26″E
- Line: Jaffa–Jerusalem railway
- Communities served: Dayr al-Shaykh, Hartuv
- Operated By: Hejaz railway Palestine Railways; Israel Railways

Deir es Sheik Station, also known as Bar Giora station (he: תחנת הרכבת בר גיורא). The stop serviced the nearby village of Dayr al-Shaykh and also provided steam locomotives with water from the nearby spring. The line was shut down in 1998, and then refurbished in 2003, with Bar Giora station becoming a control and operations center that was closed to passengers.

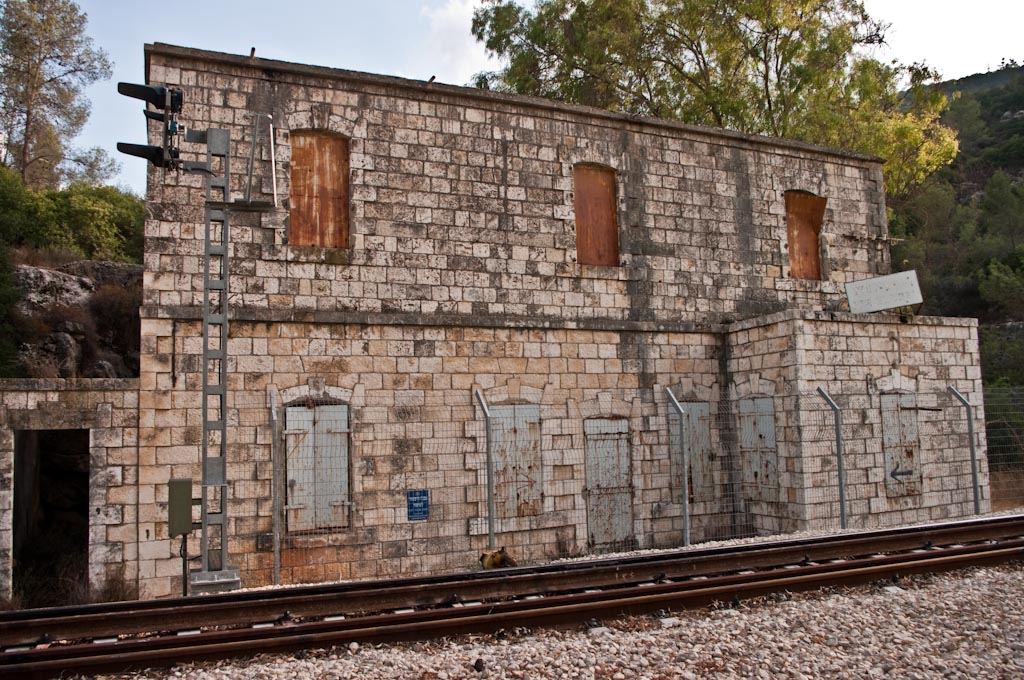
Bar Giora Station today (2009)

The line was closed again in 2020 due to the COVID-19 pandemic, and never reopened. Israel Railways maintains the line and the disused station, but has no plans to bring it back into operational use.

In 2023, funds were reserved to convert the line into a mixed use trail, and the stations would turn into tourist information centers.

== Galilee District ==
=== Afula ===
Afula Railway Station was the fourth station on the Jezreel Valley railway between Haifa and the Jordan River, and was one of the termini of the Afula–Nablus railway line. It opened around 1905, was destroyed in 1945 Night of the Trains sabotage operation, and stopped operating in 1946. A new station was built at a different site by Israel Railways, which opened in 2016.

== Haifa District ==
=== Balad al-Sheikh Station ===
Balad al-Sheik Station
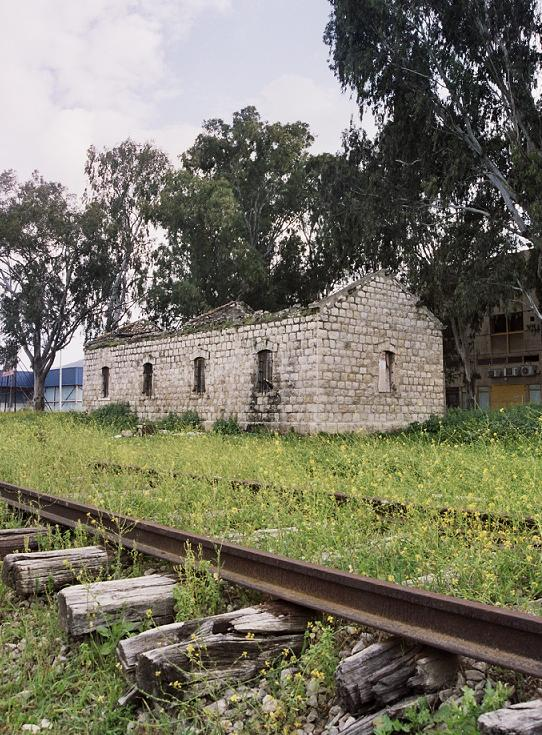
- Balad al-Sheikh Station ruins, 2010

محطة بلد الشيخ

Details
- In operation: 1904–1949
- Location: Near Nesher; 32°46′54″N 35°02′15″E
- Line: Jezreel Valley railway
- Communities served: Balad al-Sheikh; Nesher
- Operated By: Hejaz railway Palestine Railways

Balad al-Sheikh station was on the Haifa line, and was named for a nearby community. It was also known as Shumariyyah, and was renamed Tel Hanan in 1948 when the village was renamed.

The station was built in 1904 by Meissner, and then demolished during WW1 so that the rails could be used to build a line in the Sinai. It was entirely rebuilt by the British forces in 1935. There was also a line built from this station to Acre in 1913. The station was also known as Station 4.5, being near mile marker 4.5 from Haifa Bay.

== Samaria District ==
=== Jenin ===
Jenin Station
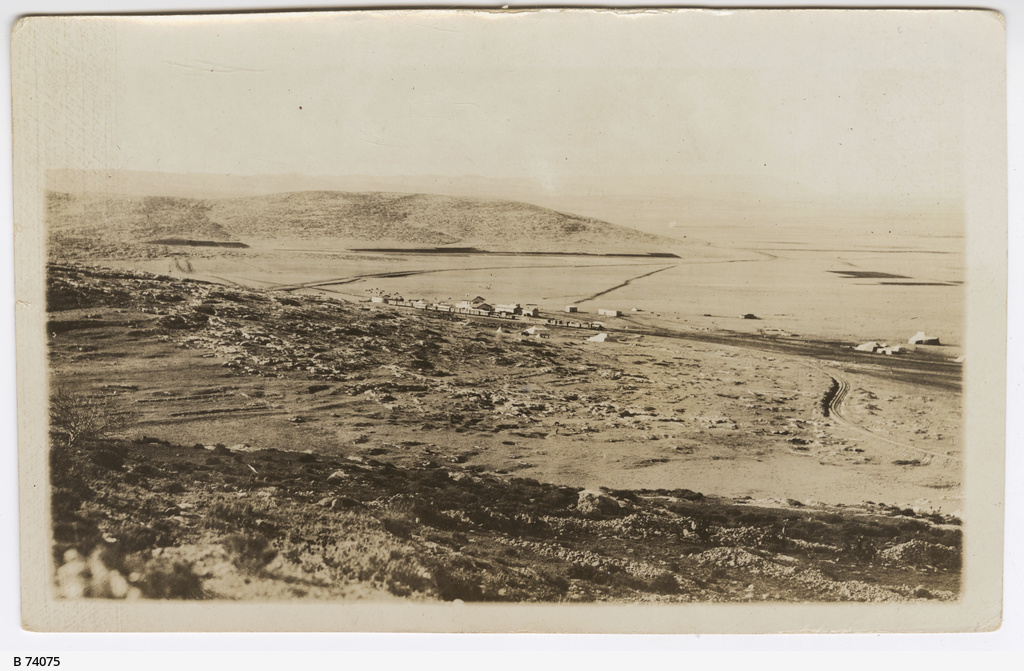
- A train leaving Jenin in 1917

جنين

Details
- In operation: 1915–1948
- Location: Jenin; 32°27′47″N 35°17′09″E
- Line: Afula-Nablus railway line
- Communities served: Jenin
- Operated By: Hejaz railway Palestine Railways

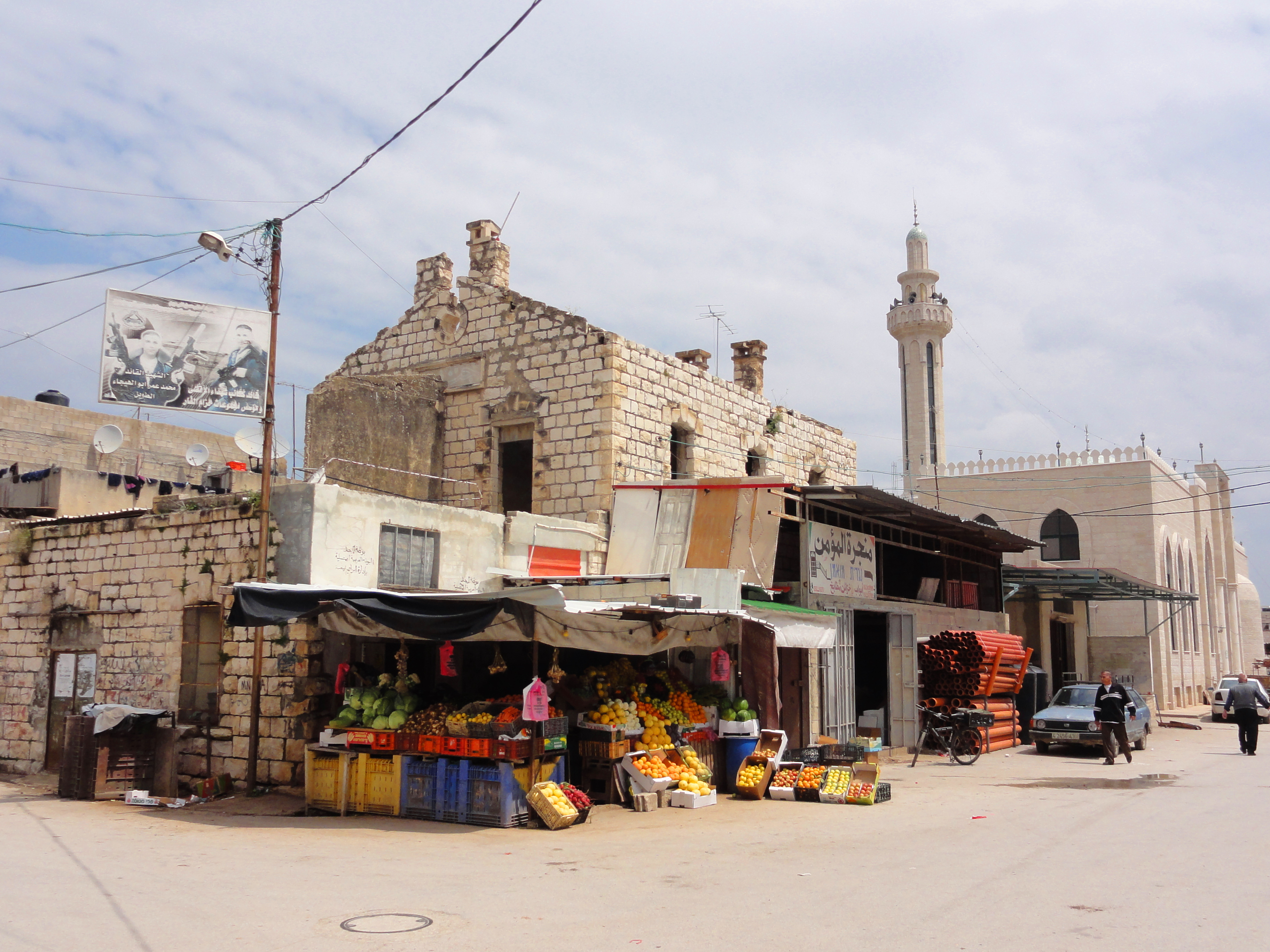
Jenin Station today (2011)

Jenin's train station was built in 1915 along with the spur line from Afula station. When the British forces captured Jenin in September 1917 they found "a number of engines and a quantity of rolling stock in the station". It had five buildings, and was made from local stone and wood. The station contained housing for employees, and water was pumped from the village to tanks at the station. By 1937, the water supply was considered "unreliable". It was a center of trade, and had a detachment of the Palestine Police Force. After the 1948 Arab–Israeli War Jenin was under Jordanian control, and the station stopped operating. It organically became the site of a refugee camp, with the station forming the main square, and the tracks were destroyed by the Jordanian authorities in the mid-1960s. Currently, the station has been turned into storage, and is surrounded by small shops.

=== Nablus ===
Nablus Station
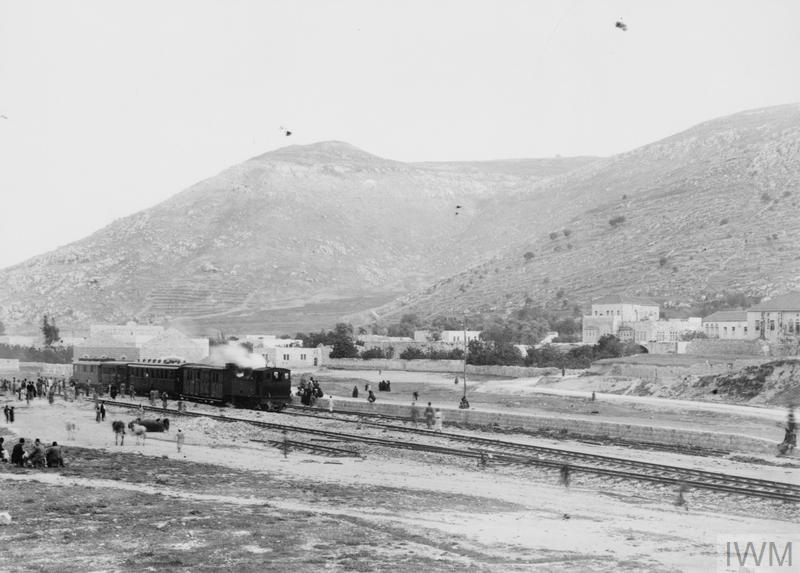
- Train at a station in Nablus, 1917

نابلس תחנת הרכבת שכם

Details
- In operation: 1915–1948
- Location: Nablus; 32°13′10″N 35°15′59″E
- Line: Afula-Nablus railway line
- Communities served: Nablus
- Operated By: Hejaz railway Palestine Railways

The line from Masudiyya to Nablus was built in 1915, and then destroyed by British bombing in the Battle of Nablus.

It was planned to be a stop on the way to Jerusalem, but the continuation of the line was never completed. Some sources say that the Ottomans were influenced by the French, who owned the Jaffa-Jerusalem line and were worried about competition. Following the British takeover of Palestine, it was rebuilt and the line was returned to service.

The station was used for travelers from Jerusalem to access the broader Hejaz rail system. The position of the railway station determined the new city center after the 1927 Jericho Earthquake. The tracks were destroyed by the Jordanian occupation in the mid-1960s. The station is currently broken down with no obvious signage, and is used as a pickle factory.
