= Mevo Beitar =

Mevo Beitar: מְבוֹא בֵּיתָר (Hebrew); مبو بيتار (Arabic)
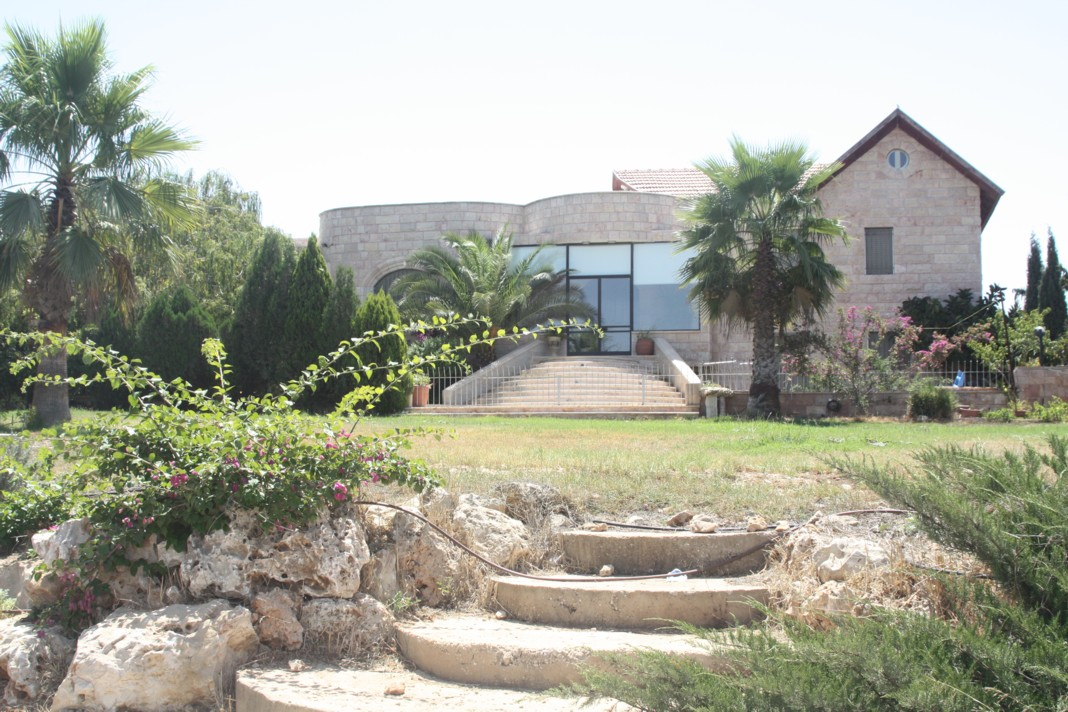
- Etymology: Beitar Gateway
- Location within Jerusalem District Location within Israel
- Coordinates: 31°43′21″N 35°6′24″E
- Country: Israel
- District: Jerusalem
- Council: Mateh Yehuda
- Affiliation: Mishkei Herut Beitar
- Founded: 24 April 1950
- Founder: Beitar members
- Population (2024): 1,153

Mevo Beitar (Hebrew: מְבוֹא בֵּיתָר, lit. Beitar Gateway) is a moshav shitufi in central Israel. Located ten kilometres south-west of Jerusalem in the Jerusalem corridor, it falls under the jurisdiction of Mateh Yehuda Regional Council. In 2024 it had a population of 1,153.

== History ==
The village was established near the Betar fortress on 24 April 1950 by native Israelis and immigrants from Argentina who were members of the Beitar movement, including Matityahu Drobles, later a member of the Knesset. It was founded on the land of the depopulated Arab village of al-Qabu. Located around a kilometre from the Green Line, it was a "Sefer settlement" (which meant it was entitled to financial compensation) until the Six-Day War.
