= Betar (ancient city) =

Ancient Jewish fortress near Battir, West Bank, Israel

- בֵּיתַּר (Hebrew)
- Bether, Bethar, Betthar, Bettar, Beitar, Beth-ar, Beth-er
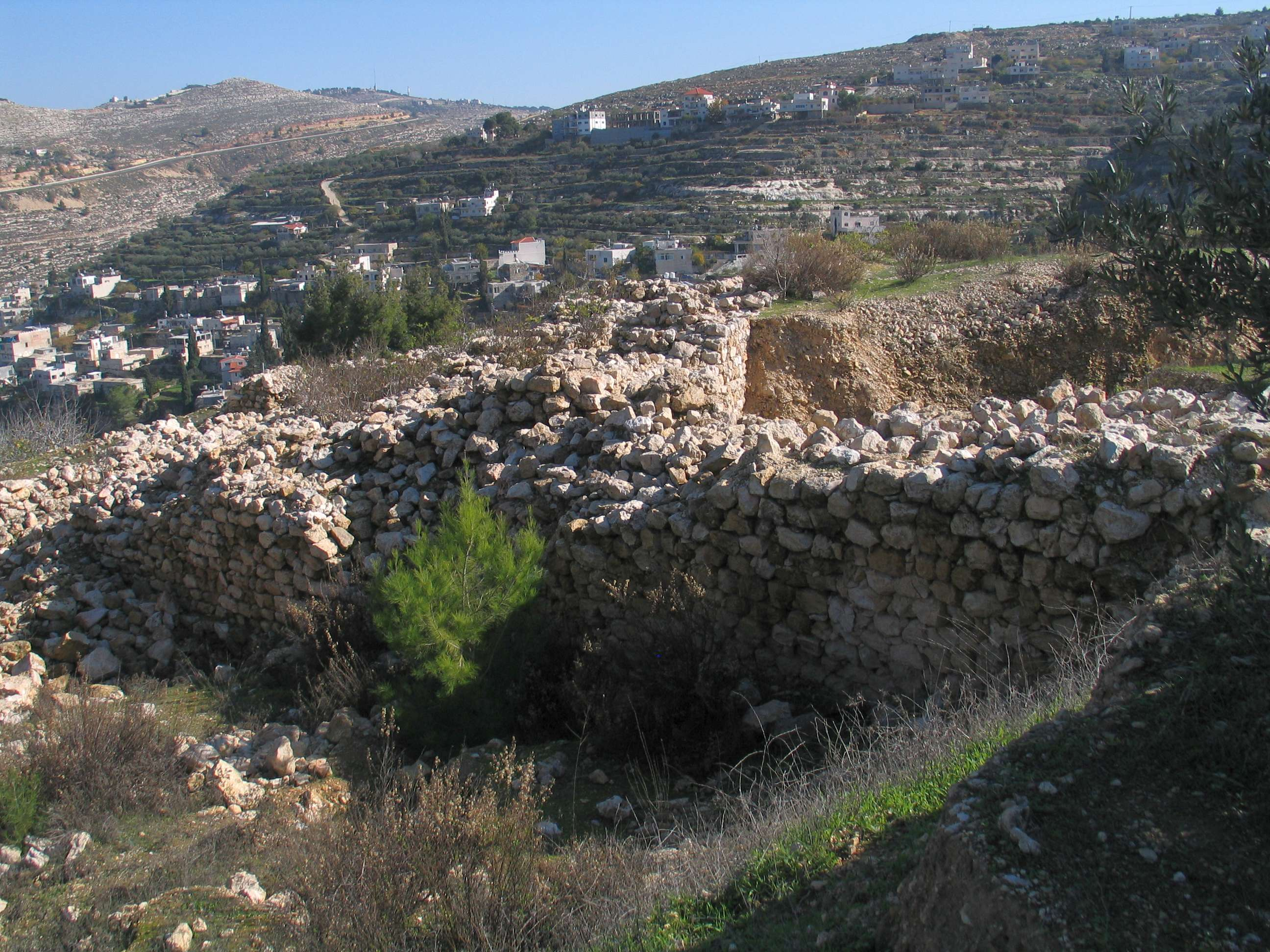
- Ancient fortifications at the site

- Location within the West Bank
- 31°43′48.0″N 35°08′08.0″E
- Type: settlement
- Periods: Iron Age II to Roman period
- Associated with: Jews
- Location: Battir, West Bank
- Region: Judaean Mountains
- Part of: Kingdom of Judah (first); Judaea (Roman province) (last)
- ITM grid ref: 163/126

History
- Abandoned: 135 CE
- Event: Bar Kokhba Revolt

Site notes
- Height: 680 m (2,230 ft)
- Condition: In ruins

Betar (Hebrew: בֵּיתַּר, romanized: Bēttar) was an ancient Jewish town in the Judaean Mountains, continuously inhabited since the Iron Age and up until the 2nd century CE. It is most famously known as the final stronghold of the Bar Kokhba Revolt. It was besieged and destroyed by the Romans in 135 CE.

Betar appears in various ancient sources, including the Jerusalem and Babylonian Talmuds, as well as in midrashic literature and Patristic writings. These accounts depict the siege as a prolonged and devastating campaign, culminating in the large-scale massacre of its inhabitants. According to Jewish tradition, tens of thousands were killed, and their bodies were left unburied until the reign of Emperor Antoninus Pius, when burial was finally permitted. The fall of Betar is observed on the fast day of Tisha B'Av, alongside other national calamities such as the destruction of the First and Second Temples in Jerusalem.

The archaeological site of ancient Betar, also known as Tel Betar (Hebrew: תל ביתר, lit. 'Tell of Betar') or Khirbet al-Yahud (Arabic: خربة اليهود, lit. 'Ruin of the Jews'), is located near the modern Palestinian village of Battir, which preserves the ancient name. Although it has never been systematically excavated, limited archaeological work has revealed remains associated with the Roman siege and destruction, such as hurriedly-built defensive walls, slingstones and arrowheads. Additional information about the siege comes from a nearby Latin inscription that names detached troops from Legio V Macedonica and Legio XI Claudia, while the remains of surrounding Roman camps suggest a siege force numbering up to 10,000–12,000 soldiers.

Betar's legacy endures into the modern era. In 1923, the name Betar was adopted by the Revisionist Zionist youth movement, invoking the town's fall as a symbol of Jewish heroism and national resilience. In 1950, the moshav Mevo Beitar was founded near the site of the ancient city by members of the Betar movement. Four decades later, in 1990, the settlement of Beitar Illit was established just one kilometer from the ruins, likewise named in memory of ancient Betar.

== Name and etymology ==
The name appears in the Talmud most frequently as ביתר (Betar), and has been rendered in various forms, including Bether, Bethar, Beitar, Betthar, Beth-tar, and Beth-ter. Bēttar might mean the "place of the blade", based on the variant spelling found in the Jerusalem Talmud (Codex Leiden), where the place name is written בֵּיתתֹּר Bēṯ-Tor, the name may have simply been a contraction of two words, meaning "house of a dove." Alternatively, the name may have meant “house of Jether," a Judahite clan living in this area of the Judaean Mountains during the First Temple period according to 1 Chronicles 2:53.

The ruins of ancient Betar are located at the archeological site of Tel Betar, whose Arabic name, Khirbet el-Yehûd (خربة اليهود, 'Ruin of the Jews') may preserve a historical memory of Betar's fall and destruction during the Bar Kokhba revolt. Battir (also spelled Bittir), the contemporary Palestinian Arab village where the ruin is located, preserves the ancient name of Betar.

== Location and geography ==
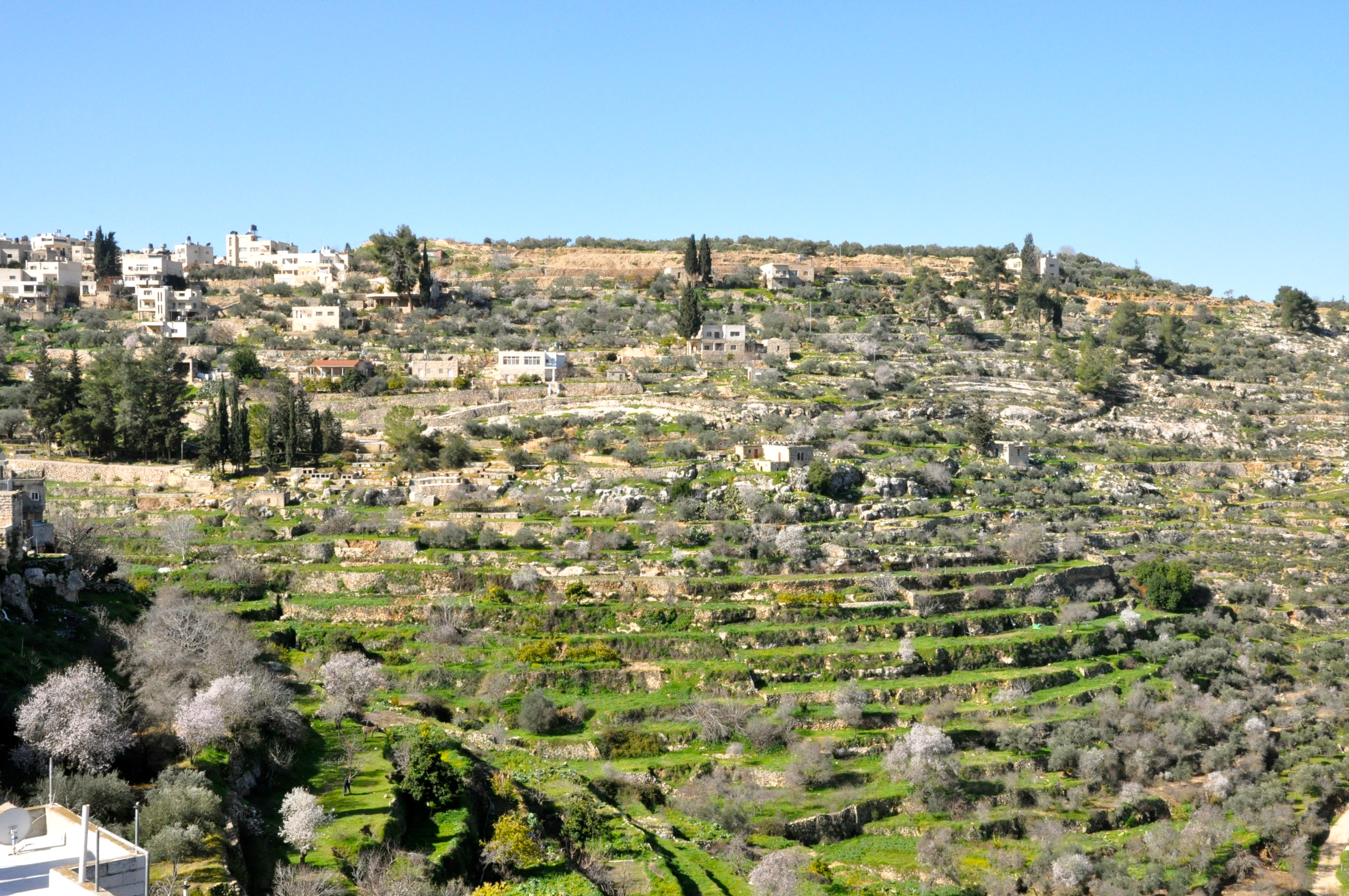
View of modern Bittir; ancient Betar was located on the hill shown, today the archaeological site also known as Khirbet el-Yehud

Betar was perched on a prominent hill about 11 kilometres (6.8 mi) southwest of Jerusalem. Deep valleys to the west, north, and east of the hill surround it. It was situated on a declivity that rises to an elevation of about 680 metres (2,230 ft) above sea-level. The Roman road that connected Jerusalem with Beit Guvrin before going on to Gaza passed through the Valley of Rephaim, which is to the north. It connects by a saddle to another hill to the south, where the remains of the ancient Roman camps can still be seen from the air.

== History ==
=== Iron Age ===
The origins of Betar are likely in the Iron Age Kingdom of Judah, as evidenced by pottery findings dating to Iron Age II, the 8th century BCE until the fall of the kingdom. It is not mentioned in the Masoretic Text of the Hebrew Bible, but is added in the Septuagint (in Codex Sinaiticus) as one of the cities of the Tribe of Judah after Joshua 15:59, using the Greek spelling (Ancient Greek: Βαιθηρ). It also appears with the variant spelling Βαιθθηρ in Codex Alexandrinus' version of the Septuagint at 1 Chronicles 6:44. The discovery of a LMLK-stamped jar handle with a two-winged symbol, characteristic of the late 8th century BCE, supports the presence of a Judahite settlement at Betar during the Iron Age II.

=== Classical Age ===
==== Hellenistic period ====
Several coins dating to the Second Temple period have been recovered from the site, including a dilepton of Antiochus III (r. 222–187 BCE), an illegible coin from the Hellenistic period, and a prutot issued under Hasmonean king Alexander Jannaeus (r. 103–76 BCE).

==== Roman period ====
Coins also include a coin of Herod the Great (r. 37–4 BCE) minted in Samaria.

Following the destruction of Jerusalem during the First Jewish–Roman War, in 70 CE, Betar's importance grew. It is believed that early in Hadrian's rule, Jewish institutions relocated there, probably due to the city's proximity to the destroyed Jerusalem. The fortified summit of Betar enclosed an area of approximately 40 dunams. Based on archaeological estimates of population density, David Ussishkin believes the site housed 1,000 to 2,000 people prior to the Bar Kokhba Revolt.

==== Bar Kokhba Revolt ====
Siege of Betar
- Part of Bar Kokhba revolt
Date	August 135 CE
Location	Judaea, Roman Empire
Result	Roman victory

Belligerents
Jews	Roman Empire

Commanders and leaders
Simon Bar Kokhba	

Units involved
	Legio V Macedonica; Legio XI Claudia

During the Bar Kokhba Revolt, Betar served as the final stronghold of Simon bar Kokhba, the leader of the uprising. Multiple ancient Jewish sources, including the Talmuds (works of religious law) and midrashim (rabbinical exegeses of the Bible), mention the city, the siege, and the fate of its inhabitants. The 4th-century Christian historian Eusebius of Caesarea also refers to the siege, writing: "The war reached its height in the eighteenth year of the reign of Hadrian in Beththera, which was a strong citadel not very far from Jerusalem; the siege lasted a long time before the rebels were driven to final destruction by famine and thirst and the instigator of their madness paid the penalty he deserved." His contemporary, Jerome, also referenced the event: "In this month was the temple in Jerusalem set on fire and destroyed by Nabuchodonosor and, many years afterwards, by Titus and Vespasian, and (in this month) the town of Bether was taken, where many thousands of Jews had fled; and the temple was plowed by Turannius Rufus to the disgrace of the subjugated people."

Archaeological surveys and limited excavations have helped reconstruct aspects of Betar during the revolt and siege. A defensive wall uncovered at the site was found to be hastily and unevenly constructed, leading archaeologists to conclude that it was likely built under pressure during the Roman advance. The construction involved filling sloped bedrock with earth and stones, building retaining walls as fortifications, and incorporating elements of earlier structures. Today, modern houses have been built in the depression, along with the planting of fruit trees. Although the general ruin is now used by the villagers of Battir for growing olive trees, along the purlieu of the site can still be seen the partial, extant remains of a Herodian wall and a Herodian tower.

Dozens of slingstones have been discovered at the site. One particularly large example, documented in 1894, weighed 41 kg and measured 30 cm in diameter. In 1984, a total of 38 slingstones were found, including a concentration of 22 found in situ on the roof of a rectangular tower. The stones varied in size, shape, and material: most were made of limestone, while a smaller number were composed of flint. Their inconsistent dimensions and roughly worked surfaces suggest that they were produced hastily, likely during the siege. Iron arrowheads were also recovered; Although poorly preserved, they correspond to a type commonly associated with Bar Kokhba-era contexts, featuring three ridges and a tang. Similar arrowheads have been found in the Judaean Desert refuge caves linked to the revolt.

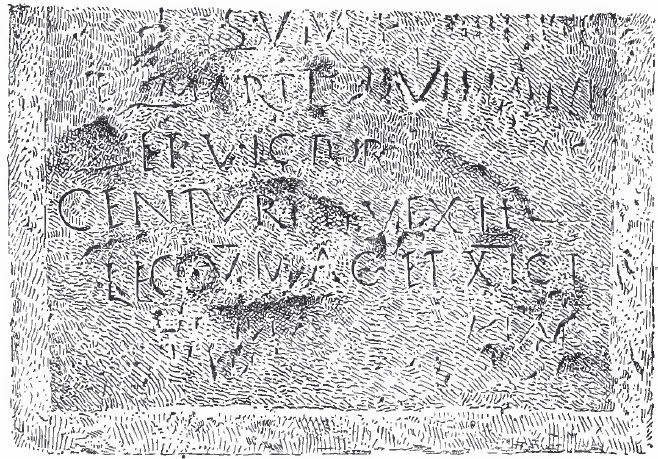
Latin inscription near Battir's spring naming detachments of Legio V Macedonica and Legio XI Claudia

According to Kennedy and Riley, the size of the two largest camps discovered nearby (A and B) would indicate that there was enough for 6000 and 1800 soldiers during the siege of the city, respectively. It is not definite that Camps C, E, and F were actually temporary Roman camps, but if they are contemporaneous with the addition of more troops in Camps C, D, E, and F, the overall siege force may have been around 10–12,000 soldiers.

A rock-cut Latin inscription found near the spring in Battir, carved into a framed stone slab at the entrance to a water channel, identifies vexillarii—detached troops—from the Fifth Macedonian Legion (Legio V Macedonica) and the Eleventh Claudian Legion (Legio XI Claudia)—both normally stationed in Moesia Inferior, a Roman province in the Balkans. The inscription suggests that these units took part in the siege of Betar, possibly constructing or maintaining the water infrastructure used during the campaign.

The number of people that concentrated in Betar during the siege is uncertain. According to Menahem Mor, some refugees from Betar likely fled to nearby including the Te'omim Cave and others in the adjacent Nahal Sorek region.

==== Aftermath ====
The destruction of Betar in 135 put an end to the Jewish–Roman wars against Rome, and effectively quashed any Jewish hopes for self-governance in that period. Following the Fall of Betar, the Romans went on a systematic campaign of wiping out the remaining Judean villages, and hunting down refugees and the remaining rebels, with the last pockets of resistance being eliminated by the spring of 136, as mentioned in the chronicle of Cassius Dio.

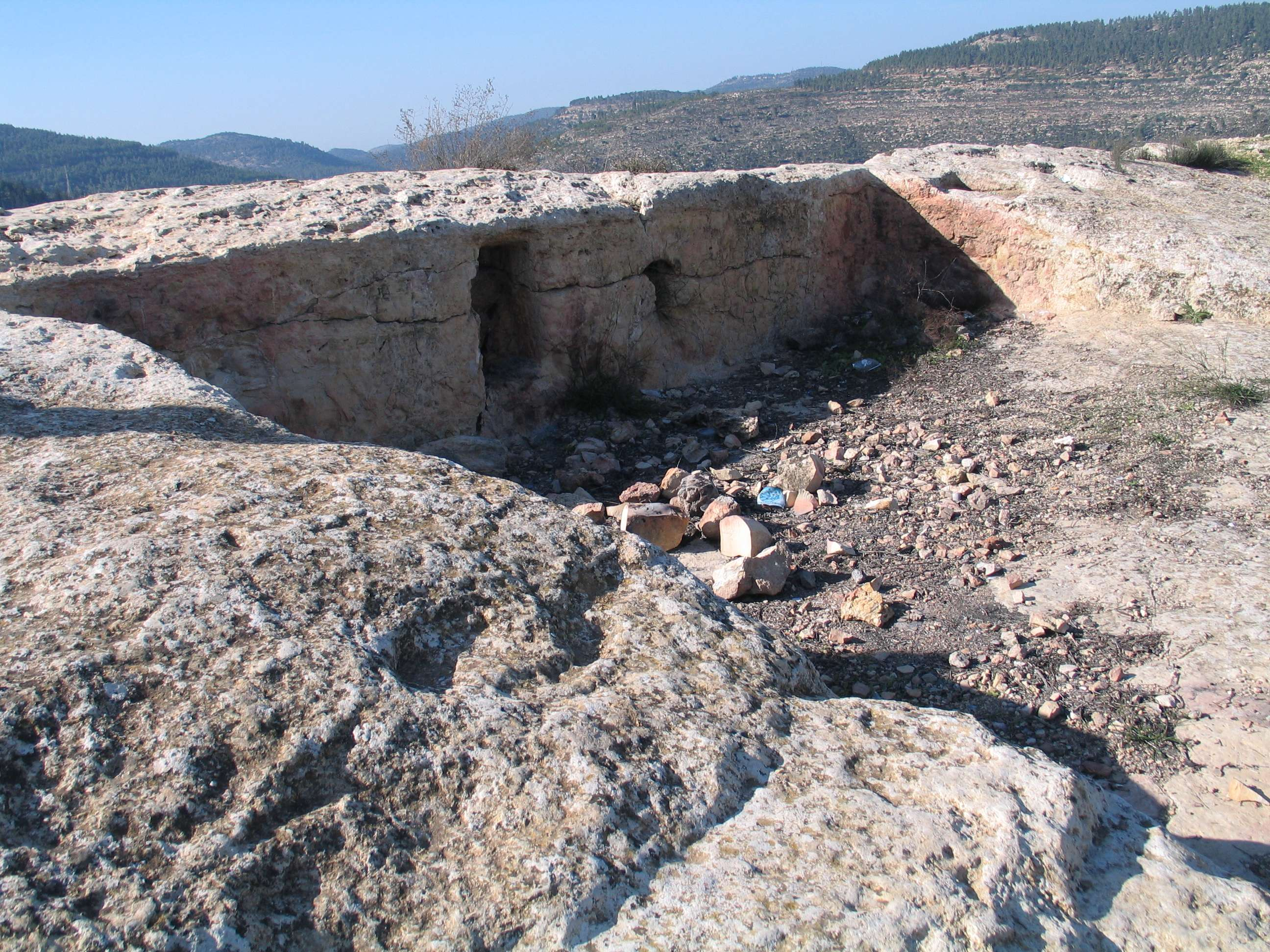
Carved foundations at Khirbet al-Yahud

The destruction of Betar by Roman troops, accompanied by the widespread killing of its residents, marked the end of habitation at the site. Clermont-Ganneau interpreted the Latin inscription mentioning the legions as evidence of a Roman garrison stationed at the site in the aftermath of the revolt. However, this interpretation has been challenged by David Ussishkin, who argues that the inscription was carved during the siege, not afterward. Sometime later Bittir, the new gentile settlement and now a Palestinian village in the present, was established in the subsequent centuries.

== Betar in rabbinic literature ==
According to the Jerusalem Talmud, Betar remained a thriving town fifty-two years after the destruction of the Second Temple, until it came to its demise. Modern chroniclers push back the destruction of Betar some years later, making the time-frame brought down in the Jerusalem Talmud hard to reconcile, even if, according to Jewish tradition, the destruction of the Second Temple occurred in 68 CE. Either the time-frame carried in the Talmud is a gross error, or else some of the dates used by modern-day chroniclers are purely anachronistic.

=== Siege ===
According to the Jerusalem Talmud, the city was besieged for three and a half years before it finally fell (Ta'anit 4:5 [13]). According to Jewish tradition, the fortress was breached and destroyed on the fast of Tisha B'Av, in the year 135, on the ninth day of the lunar month Av, a day of mourning for the destruction of the First and the Second Jewish Temple. The Mishnah, Ta'anit 4:6 states: "On the ninth of Av, it was decreed that our fathers should not enter the Land, the Temple was destroyed the first and second time, Beitar was captured and the city [of Jerusalem] was plowed under."

Earlier, when the Roman army had circumvallated the city (from Latin, circum- + vallum, round-about + rampart), some sixty men of Israel went down and tried to make a breach in the Roman rampart, but to no avail. When they had not returned and were presumed to be dead, the Chazal permitted their wives to remarry, even though their husbands' bodies had not been retrieved.

According to Lamentations Rabbah, when Bar Kokhba's body was shown to Hadrian, the emperor ordered that the rest of the body be brought forward. It was discovered with a snake coiled around his neck, leading Hadrian to state: "If his God had not slain him, who could have overcome him?"

=== Massacre ===
The fall of Betar is described in rabbinic literature as a catastrophic event marked by large-scale loss of life. In Ta'anit 4:5, the Jerusalem Talmud states that the number of dead was so great that "the Roman "went about slaughtering them until a horse sunk in blood up to its nostrils, and the blood carried away boulders that weighted forty sela until it went four miles into the sea"—despite Betar being "forty miles distant from the sea." The account also reports that only one youth survived the massacre: Simeon ben Gamaliel II.

Another account appears in the Babylonian Talmud, Gittin 57a–58a, where Rabbi Yohanan relates that "the brains of three hundred children were found upon one stone," along with "three hundred baskets of what remained of phylacteries (tefillin)"—each of which, it says, "had the capacity to hold three seahs" (approximately 28 liters). The text adds: "If you should come to take [all of them] into account, you would find that they amounted to three hundred measures."

In Lamentations Rabbah, Rabban Shimon ben Gamliel is quoted as saying: "Five hundred schools were in Betar, while the smallest of them wasn't less than three hundred children." The children would say: "If the enemy should ever come upon us, with these styli [used in pointing at the letters of sacred writ] we'll go forth and stab them." The narrative concludes: "But since iniquities had caused [their fall], the enemy came in and wrapped up each and every child in his own book and burnt them together, and no one remained except me." (Note: This has been interpreted as evidence that members of the Patriarchal family, and possibly other sages, were present in Betar and supported the revolt. Historian David Goodblatt, however, questioned the historical reliability of this account, citing the implausibility of the numbers and preferring a parallel version from the Babylonian Talmud that refers instead to a thousand pupils studying in the house of Gamliel II in Yavne prior to the revolt, thus disconnecting the Patriarch from Betar. In response, Noah Hacham argued that numerical exaggeration is typical of ancient texts and should not disqualify the Jerusalem Talmud as a historical source; he further contended that the Babylonian Talmud sought to distance Rabban Shimon ben Gamliel from the revolt because it was shaped by the principle of dina de-malkhuta dina—an obligation for obedience to ruling authorities—which led its editors to suppress traditions that might appear sympathetic to uprisings against imperial power, unlike the Jerusalem Talmud, which preserved a tradition linking him with Betar and the rebel cause.)

According to the Babylonian Talmud, Berakhot 48b, Hadrian had prohibited the burial of the dead, and so all the bodies remained above ground; however, they miraculously did not decompose. Years later, Hadrian's successor, Antoninus Pius, allowed the dead a decent burial. During that time, the Sages of Yavne made it a rule to acknowledge God's goodness by adding "He that is good and who does good" (Hebrew: הטוב והמטיב) in the grace said over meals.

== Research history ==
Early documentation of the site began in the mid-19th century. The first to suggest the site's identification with Betar was Victor Guérin, who visited the site in 1863. Subsequent investigations were carried out by Charles Simon Clermont-Ganneau, who examined the Latin inscription near the spring and supported Guérin's identification. Around the same period, Joseph Germer-Durand examined the same inscription, documented a milestone along the Roman road near the site, and recorded the discovery of a slingstone in the wadi below. Clermont-Ganneau also documented an ossuary that was reportedly found in Betar.

Systematic archaeological attention began in the early 20th century. In 1906, Eduard Zickermann conducted the first formal survey. Among the items he documented was a columbarium cave. Also in 1906, the Warren Cup, a silver vessel decorated with homoerotic scenes, was reportedly found at Betar; it may have been brought there originally by the Jewish rebels as a Roman war booty. Today it is on display in the British Museum in London.

Research at Betar continued under Mandatory British rule. In 1923–1924, a detailed topographic and architectural survey was led by W.D. Carroll, who published a comprehensive site plan and catalog of the ancient remains. In addition, Caroll surveyed a burial cave that was later incorporated into a sheikh tomb shrine. He also reported discovering two underground complexes on the eastern side of the ruin, which he identified as burial installations. Archaeologists Boaz Zissu and Hanan Eshel, however, consider them to be oil-press caves, similar to examples known elsewhere in ancient Judea. In 1927, Albrecht Alt was the first to highlight the Roman siege system surrounding the site, which was further examined by Adolf Schulten in 1933. Between 1944 and 1946, Shemuel Yeivin conducted a ground survey with documentation and photography by J. Schweig. S.A.S Husseini, of the Mandatory Antiquities Department, documented a rock-cut ritual bath (mikveh) on the slopes of the tell.

In 1950, Adolf Reifenberg used aerial photography to identify two Roman military camps located south of the site. In 1968, Moshe Kochavi conducted a wider regional survey of the Judean Mountains, identifying nearby settlements and military outposts associated with the Bar Kokhba Revolt. Additional aerial imagery and analysis of the site were later published by Kennedy and Riley in 1990. They also measured the Roman siege camps. In the 1970s, Z. Yeivin, then serving as the Archaeological Staff Officer for the Judea and Samaria Area, conducted a limited excavation (sounding) at the site, although the results were never formally published.

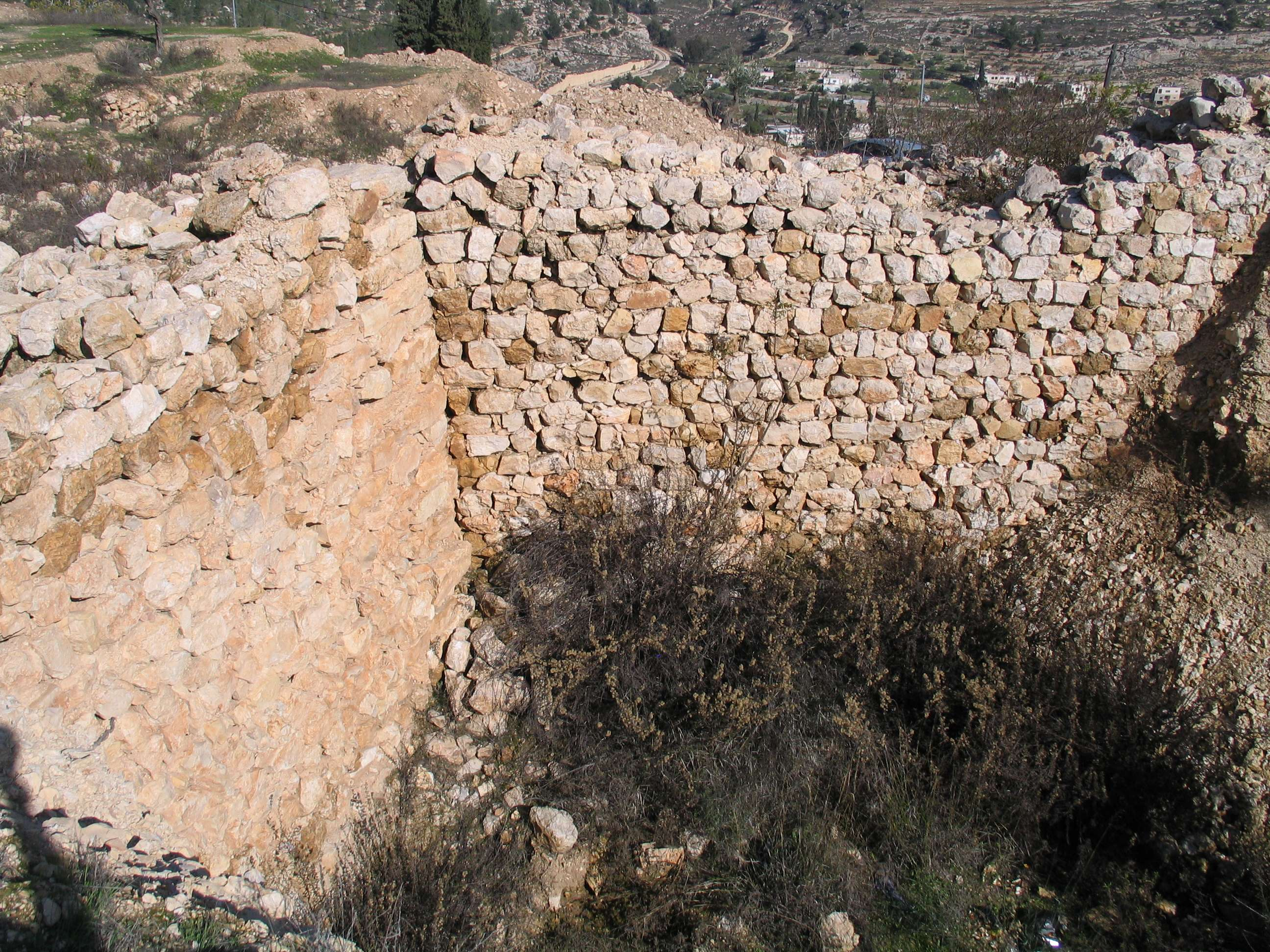
MB/Iron Age fortifications in the southern area of the ruin

In 1984, a trial excavation directed by David Ussishkin was conducted at Betar under the auspices of the Archaeological Staff Officer of Judea and Samaria, with assistance from the Institute of Archaeology at Tel Aviv University and the Israel Exploration Society. The excavation was carried out in response to illegal digging and damage caused by construction activity in the area. Excavations on the southern summit revealed a semi-circular fortification buttress and extensive fills of limestone chips and brown soil, interpreted as artificial embankments used in construction a defensive wall. On the southern slope, additional fortifications were exposed, including a rectangular tower and two more semi-circular buttresses. Walls constructed with ashlar stones were determined to be earlier than the Bar Kokhba fortifications, and possibly part of a public structure. In 2005–2006, another excavation was conducted under the auspices of the Archaeological Staff Officer of Judea and Samaria, this time led by Shahar Batz. His excavations showed that the fortifications were based both on earlier construction and on sections of a wall from the Middle Bronze and Iron Age periods, as is also known from Shiloh, Azekah, and Gezer.

== Legacy ==
=== Judaism ===
The fourth blessing in the Grace over meals is said to have been enacted by the Ḥazal in recognition of the dead at Betar who, although not afforded proper burial, their bodies did not putrefy and were, at last, brought to burial.

Rabbinic literature offers several accounts regarding the reasons for Betar's destruction. According to a story in the Jerusalem Talmud, it was because its residents lit lamps after the Temple's destruction—a response to earlier events in Jerusalem where councilors accused pilgrims of seeking office or selling property. An associate would suggest forging a deed, which the councilor wrote and the associate signed. The forged deed was sent to the pilgrim's steward with orders to bar him from his property because it was sold, causing the victim to regret ever coming to Jerusalem.

Talmudic tradition attributes the fall of Betar to a Samaritan who acted as a fifth column and sowed discord between Bar Kokhba and his maternal uncle, Rabbi Eleazar of Modi'im. Bar Kokhba suspected Eleazar of collaborating with the enemy and killed him with a single kick. This act forfeited divine protection, and shortly thereafter, Betar was captured and Bar Kokhba was killed. According to another rabbinic legend found in the Babylonian Talmud, the people of Betar had a custom of planting a cedar tree for a newborn boy and a pine for a girl, using the trees to build their wedding canopy. One day, attendants of the emperor's daughter cut down one of these trees to fix a broken part of her litter. The local residents, angered by the act, attacked the attendants. When the emperor was told of the incident, it was reported as a rebellion, prompting him to launch a military assault on the city.

=== In modern Battir ===
A tradition recalling a siege involving Jews was documented among Arab residents of Battir in the 19th century, though it may have originated in modern times. The tradition was recorded in 1874 by Charles Clermont-Ganneau, who reported being told by local fellahin (villagers) about a stone known as Hajr el Manjalik, or “the stone of the mangonel,” located on a plateau near Khirbet el-Yehud. It was said to mark the spot where a ruler named el-Melek edh-Dhaher had positioned cannon batteries to breach Khirbet el-Yehud. A similar account was cited by J. E. Hanauer in 1894, although the villager who pointed out the stone said it was a "Neby" (prophet) who had "cannonaded" the Jews. W.D. Carroll, who visited in the 1920s, also mentions this tradition.

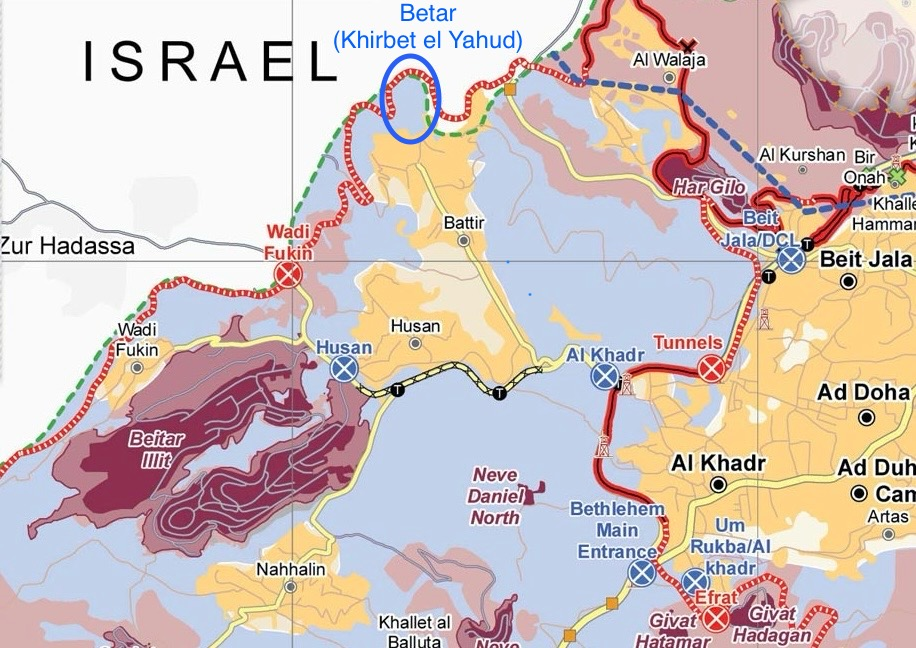
Today the Betar archeological site (Khirbet el Yahud) is in Area C of the West Bank, immediately to the north of the built up area of the Palestinian town of Battir

=== Revisionist and Religious Zionism ===
The name of the Revisionist Zionist youth movement, Betar, (בית״ר) refers to both the last Jewish fort to fall in the Bar Kokhba revolt, and to the slightly altered Hebrew abbreviation of the phrase "Berit Trumpeldor" or "Brit Yosef Trumpeldor" (ברית יוסף תרומפלדור), lit. 'Joseph Trumpeldor Alliance'.

The village of Mevo Beitar was established on 24 April 1950 by local-born Jews and Jewish immigrants from Argentina who were members of the Beitar movement, including Matityahu Drobles, later a member of the Knesset. It was founded in the vicinity of the Betar fortress location, around a kilometre from the Green Line, which gave it the character of an exposed border settlement until the Six-Day War.

Beitar Illit, lit. Upper Beitar, is named after the ancient Jewish city of Betar, whose ruins lie 1 kilometre (0.62 mi) away. It was established by a small group of young families from the religious Zionist yeshiva of Machon Meir. The first residents settled in 1990.

== Bibliography ==
- Alt, Albrecht (1927). "Das Institut im Jahre 1926". Palästinajahrbuch. 23: 5–51.
- Ameling, Walter; Cotton, Hannah M.; Eck, Werner; Ecker, Avner, eds. (2018-06-25). "LXXIII. Bethar (Bethther, Bettir, mod. Kh. el-Yahud) nos. 3197-3200". Iudaea / Idumaea, Part 1: 2649-3324. Corpus Inscriptionum Iudaeae/Palaestinae. De Gruyter. pp. 597–604. doi:10.1515/9783110544213-078. ISBN 978-3-11-054421-3.
- Berenbaum, Michael; Skolnik, Fred, eds. (2007). "Bethar (Betar)". Encyclopaedia Judaica. Vol. 3 (2nd ed.). Thomson Gale. pp. 527–528. ISBN 978-0-02-865931-2. "Quoting from Gibson, Shimon. Encyclopaedia Hebraica (2nd ed.)"
- Carroll, W. D. (1924). "Bittir and its Archaeological Remains" (PDF). Annual of the American Schools of Oriental Research. 5: 77–103.
- Clermont-Ganneau, Charles (1899). Archaeological Researches in Palestine 1873–1874. Vol. 1. London: Committee of the Palestine Exploration Fund.
- Conder, C. R.; Kitchener, H. H. (1883). The Survey of Western Palestine: Memoirs of the Topography, Orography, Hydrography, and Archaeology. Vol. 3. London: Committee of the Palestine Exploration Fund. p. 128.
- Eshel, Hanan; Zissu, Boaz (2019). "Betar, Bar Kokhba's Last Stronghold". The Bar Kokhba Revolt: The Archaeological Evidence. Treasures of the Past: The David and Jemima Jeselsohn Library. Jerusalem: Yad Izhak Ben Zvi. pp. 118–121. ISBN 978-965-217-429-1.
- Germer-Durand, Joseph (1894). "Épigraphie palestinienne". Revue Biblique. 3: 613–614.
- Guérin, V. (1869). Description Géographique, Historique et Archéologique de la Palestine. Judee, Vol 1, pt 2, part 1. Paris, Imprimé par autorisation de l'empereur à l'Impr. impériale.
- Hanauer, J. E. (1894-04-01). "Notes on the Winged Figure at Jaffa, on Bether, &c". Palestine Exploration Quarterly. 26 (2): 148–150. doi:10.1179/peq.1894.26.2.148. ISSN 0031-0328.
- Kochavi, Moshe (1972). "The Land of Judah". In Kochavi, Moshe (ed.). Judaea, Samaria and the Golan: Archaeological Survey 1967–1968 (in Hebrew). Jerusalem. pp. 19–89.
- Kennedy, David; Riley, Derrick (1990). Rome's Desert Frontier from the Air. London.
- Mor, Menahem (2016). The Second Jewish Revolt: The Bar Kokhba War, 132–136 CE. Brill. ISBN 978-90-04-31463-4.
- Palmer, E. H. (1881). The Survey of Western Palestine: Arabic and English Name Lists Collected During the Survey by Lieutenants Conder and Kitchener, R. E. Transliterated and Explained by E.H. Palmer. Committee of the Palestine Exploration Fund.
- Reifenberg, Adolf (1950). "Archaeological Discoveries by Air Photography in Israel". Archaeology. 3: 40–46.
- Schulten, Adolf (1933). "Anhang: Beth-Ter". Zeitschrift des Deutschen Palästina-Vereins. 56: 180–185.
- Smallwood, E. Mary (1976). The Jews under Roman Rule from Pompey to Diocletian. SBL Press. ISBN 978-90-04-50204-8. Archived from the original on 22 April 2024.
- Ussishkin, David (1993). "Archaeological Soundings at Betar, Bar-Kochba's Last Stronghold". Tel Aviv: Journal of the Institute of Archaeology of Tel Aviv University. 20: 66–97.
- Yassif, Eli (2006). "Jewish Folk Literature in Late Antiquity". In Katz, Steven T. (ed.). The Late Roman-Rabbinic Period. The Cambridge History of Judaism. Vol. 4th. Cambridge University Press. pp. 721–748. ISBN 978-0-521-77248-8.
- Yeivin, Shemuel (1952). The War of Bar-Kochba (in Hebrew) (2nd revised ed.). Jerusalem.
- Zickermann, Eduard (1906). "Chirbet el-Jehûd (Bettîr)". Zeitschrift des Deutschen Palästina-Vereins. 29: 51–72.
