= Afula–Nablus railway line =

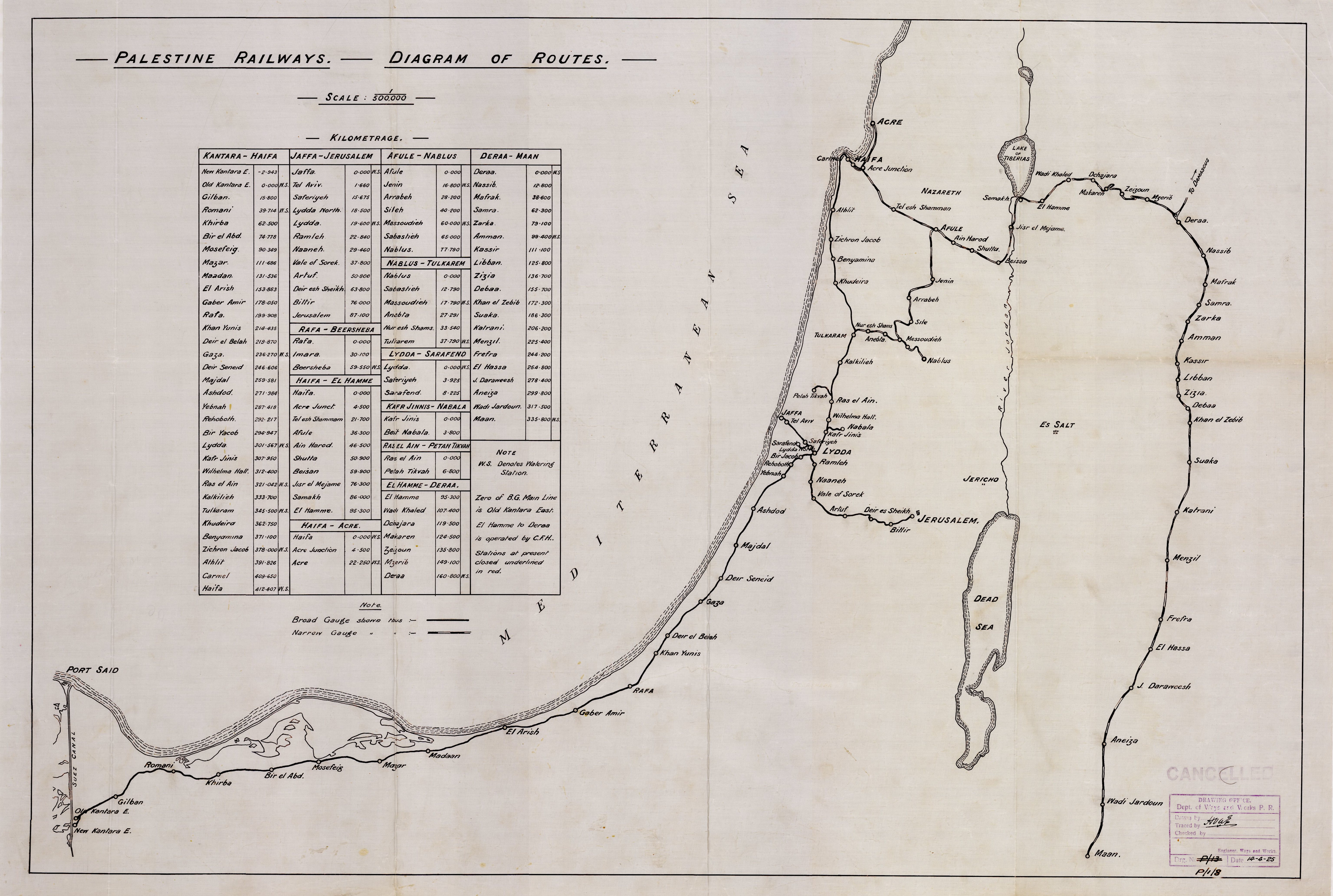
Map of the Palestine and Hejaz Railways from 1925

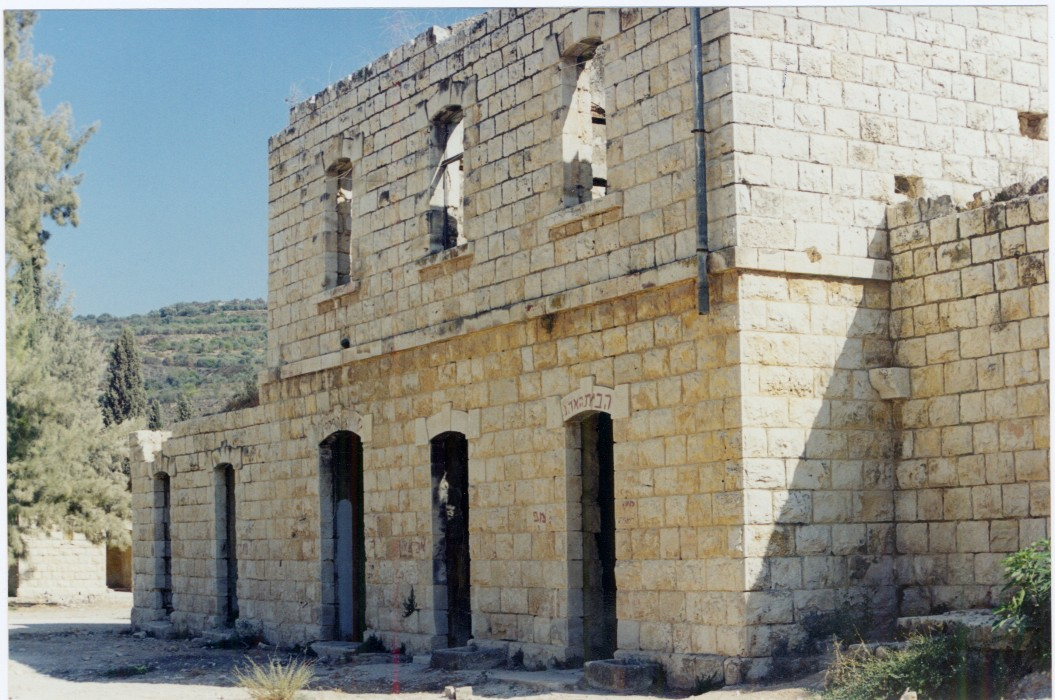
Remains of the railway station at Mas'udiya

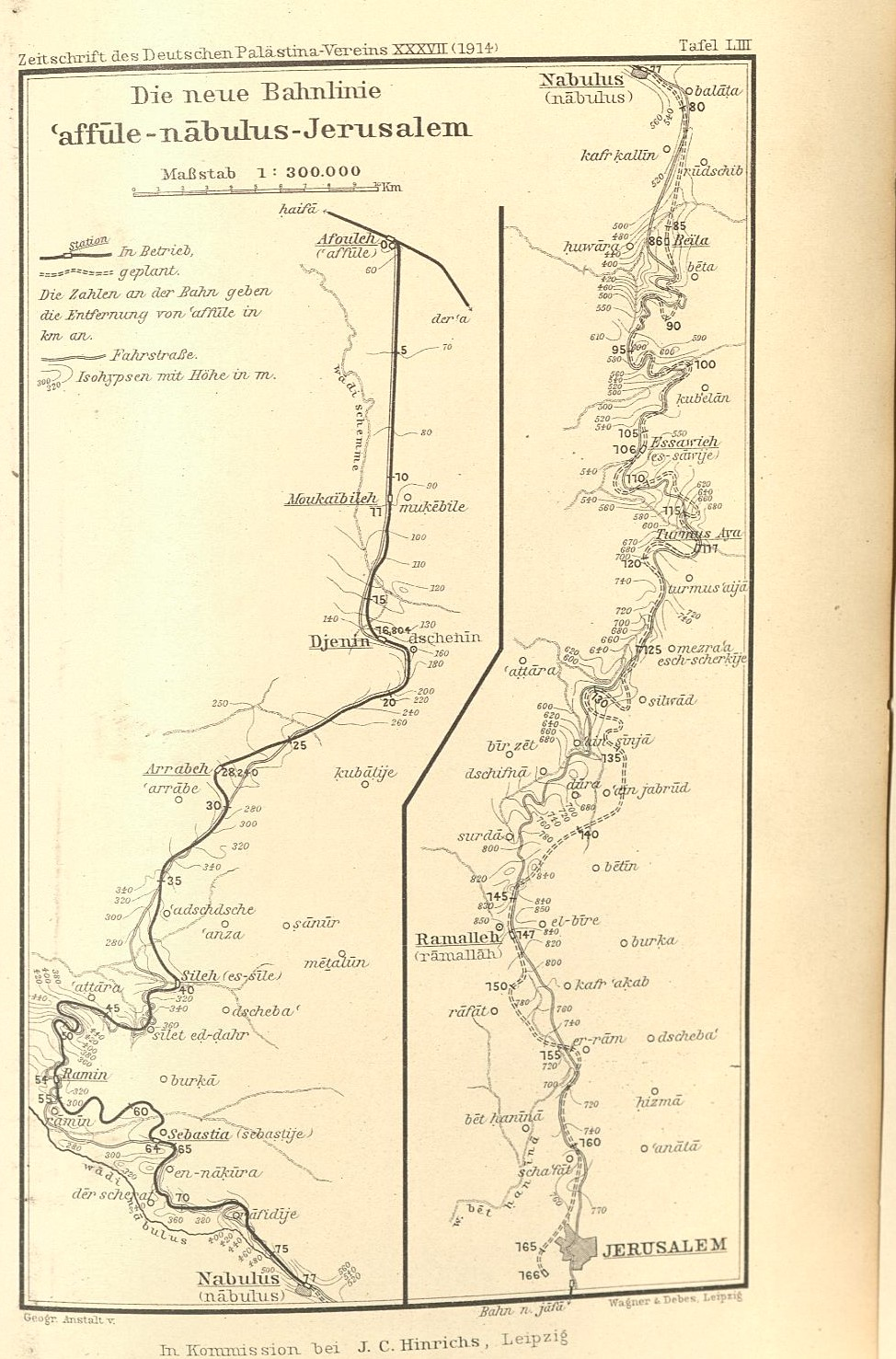
Afula–Nablus 1914 mit der geplanten Strecke nach Jerusalem. Karte von Wagner & Debes

The Afula-Nablus Railway, also known as the Samaria Railway (Hebrew: מסילת השומרון), was a branch of the Jezreel Valley railway with a track gauge of 1050 mm, that was originally intended to connect Jerusalem to the main branch of the Hejaz railway via the Haifa–Dera'a Line. These plans were never completed, and the line terminated at Nablus. The line stopped running in 1932 due to lack of traffic.

A new line linking Afula with Jenin was proposed by Israel and Turkey in the mid-2010s, but was cancelled in 2024.

== Route ==
- Afule (0 km)
- Jenin (16.8 km)
- Arrabeh (28.2 km)
- Sileh (40.2 km)
- Massoudieh (60 km)
  - Connection to Tulkarm
- Sabastieh (65 km)
- Nablus (77.8 km)
