= Battir =

Village in Bethlehem, Palestine

- Municipality type C

Arabic transcription(s)
  - Arabic: بتير
  - Latin: Bateer (official)
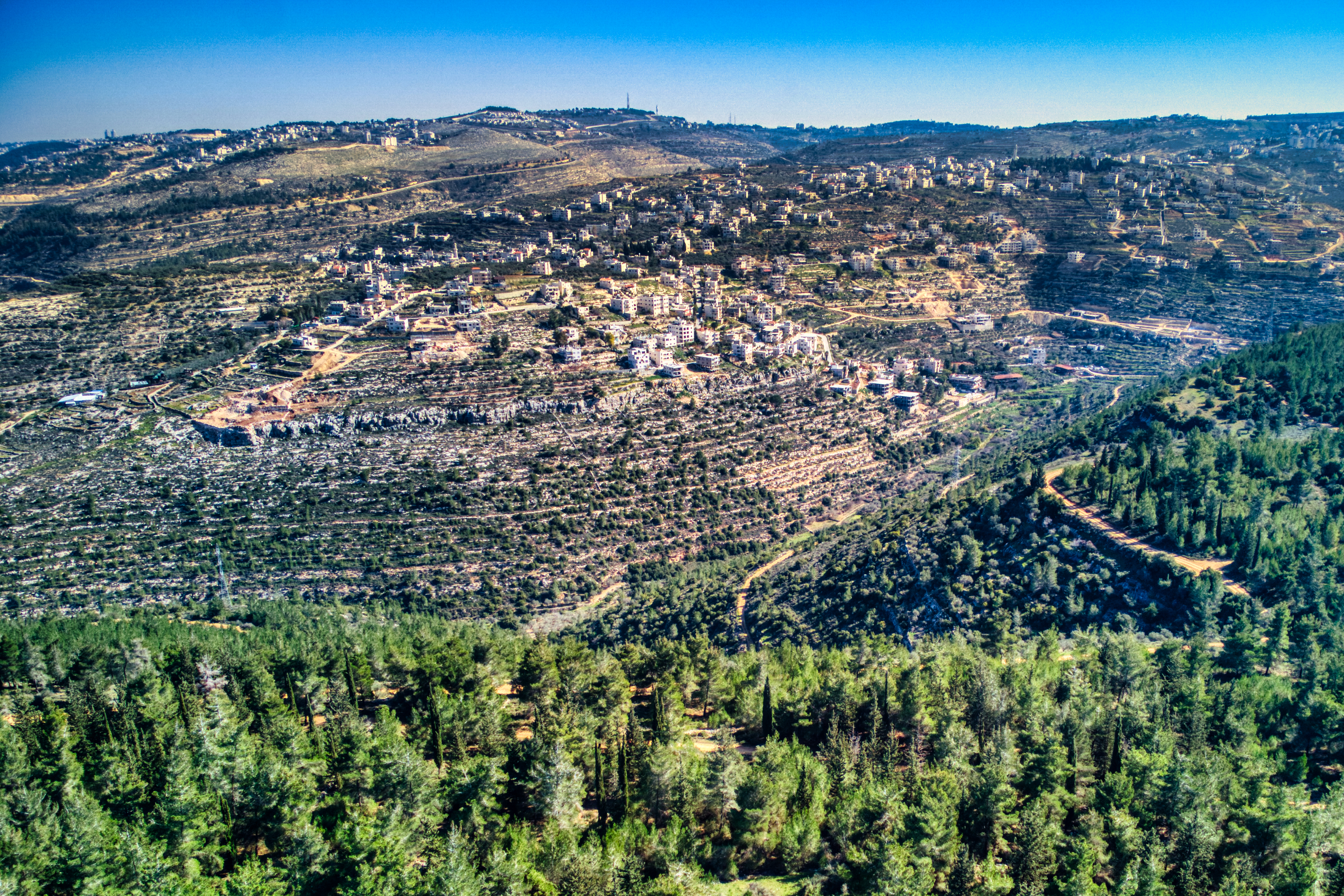
- Battir

- Location of Battir within Palestine Battir (the West Bank)
- Coordinates: 31°43′29″N 35°08′12″E
- Palestine grid: 163/126
- Country: Palestine
- Governorate: Bethlehem
- Israeli District: Jerusalem (nominally)
- Israeli Regional Council: Mateh Yehuda (nominally)

Government
  - Type: Municipality
  - Head of Municipality: Akram Bader

Area
  - Total: 7.4 km^{2} (2.9 sq mi)

Population (2017)
  - Total: 4,696
  - Density: 630/km^{2} (1,600/sq mi)
- Name meaning: After ancient Betar

UNESCO World Heritage Site
- Official name: Palestine: Land of Olives and Vines — Cultural Landscape of Southern Jerusalem, Battir
- Type: Cultural
- Criteria: iv, v
- Designated: 2014 (38th session)
- Reference no.: 1492
- Region: Arab States
- Endangered: Since 2014

Battir (Arabic: بتير, Hebrew: ביתר) is a Palestinian village in the Bethlehem Governorate of the State of Palestine, in the West Bank, 6.4 km west of Bethlehem, and southwest of Jerusalem. In 2017, the village had a population of 4,696.

Battir has long history that dates back to ancient times. Within its area is an archaeological site containing the remains of Beitar, an ancient Jewish village and the last stronghold of the Bar Kokhba revolt against the Roman Empire. The village is particularly known for its ancient terraces and an irrigation system that dates back to the Roman period. Due to this, In 2014, Battir was inscribed in the List of World Heritage Sites as a World Heritage Site in the State of Palestine, under the name Battir – Land of Olives and Vines — Cultural Landscape of Southern Jerusalem.

Battir was inhabited during the Byzantine and Islamic periods, and in the Ottoman and British Mandate censuses its population was recorded as primarily Muslim. In former times, the city lay along the route from Jerusalem to Bayt Jibrin. Battir is situated just above the modern route of the Jaffa–Jerusalem railway, which served as the armistice line between Israel and Jordan from 1949 until the Six-Day War, when it was occupied by Israel. In 2007, Battir had a population of about 4,000.

== Etymology ==
The Arabic name Battīr preserves the name Betar, an ancient Jewish town destroyed in the Bar Kokhba revolt, whose ruins can be found within the present-day village.

== History ==
=== Ancient period ===
Battir is built just north east of Khirbet el-Yahud (Arabic: خربة اليهود, lit. 'Ruin of the Jews'), also known as Tel Beitar, an archeological site that comprises the ruins of ancient ancient Betar.

The Warren Cup is also said to have been found near Battir.

=== Byzantine period ===
A mosaic from the late Byzantine or early Islamic period was found in Battir.

=== Ottoman period ===
In 1596, Battir appeared in Ottoman tax registers as a village in the Nahiya of Quds in the Liwa of Quds. It had a population of 24 households and two bachelors, all Muslims, and paid taxes on wheat, summer crops or fruit trees, and goats or beehives; a total of 4,800 Akçe. All of the revenue went to a Waqf.

In 1838 it was noted as Bittir, a Muslim village in the Beni Hasan district, west of Jerusalem.

French explorer Victor Guérin visited the place in 1863 and described it: "Bettir is, indeed, about seven miles southwest of Jerusalem, and it's located on a steep mountain. You can only get there by following a narrow path, carved in some places into the solid rock. The village itself is overlooked, as I mentioned, by a sort of rocky peninsula, very easy to fortify and defend, which still holds the remains of the old walls that once surrounded it." An Ottoman village list from about 1870 showed that Battir had a population of 239, in a total of 62 houses, though that population count only included men. It was further noted that it had "a beautiful spring flowing through the courtyard of the mosque".

In 1883, the PEF's Survey of Western Palestine described Battir as a moderate sized village, on the precipitous slope of a deep valley.

In 1896 the population of Bettir was estimated to be about 750 persons.

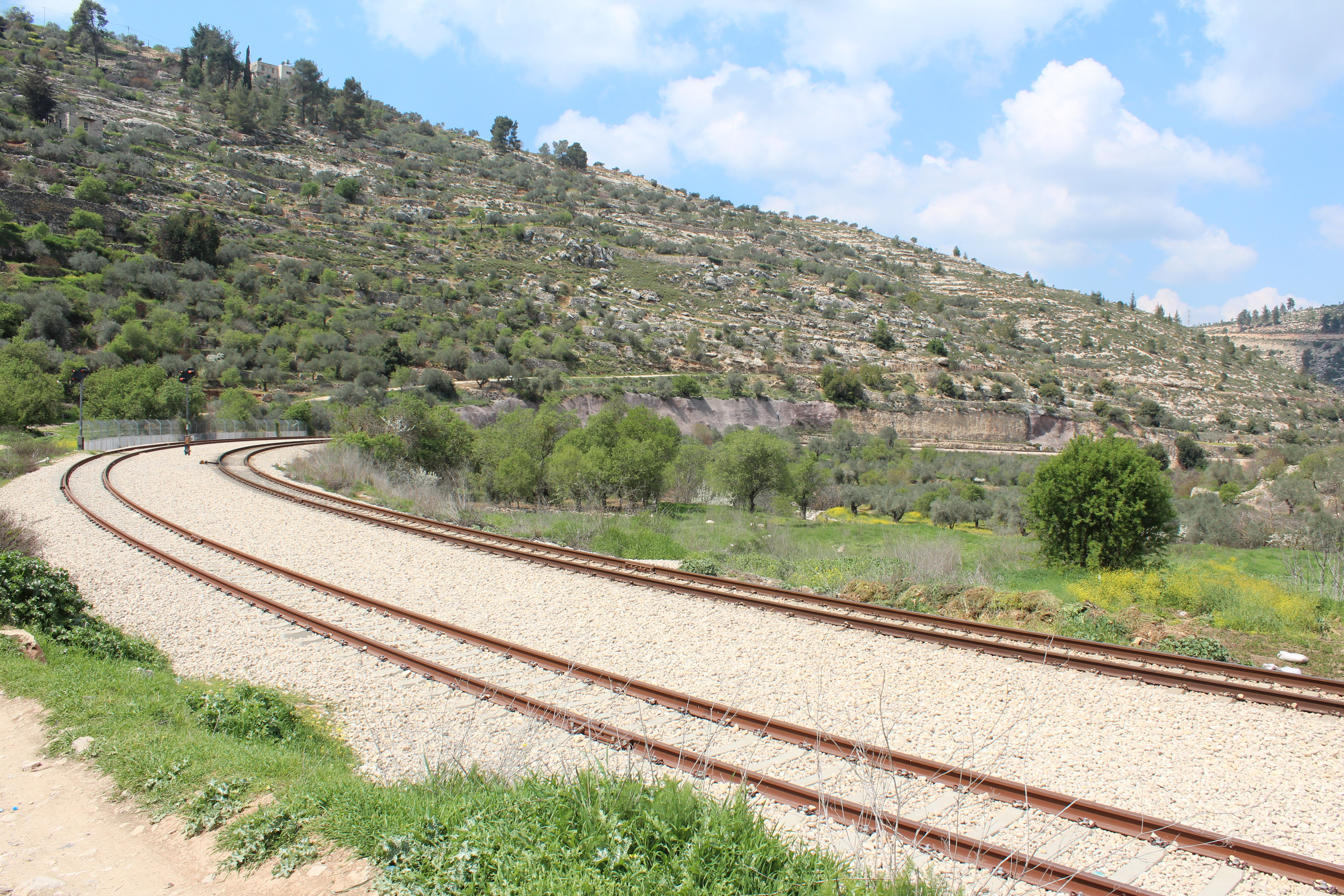
Jaffa-Jerusalem railway passing through Battir. The 1949 armistice line passes just south of the railway, placing it on the Israeli side.

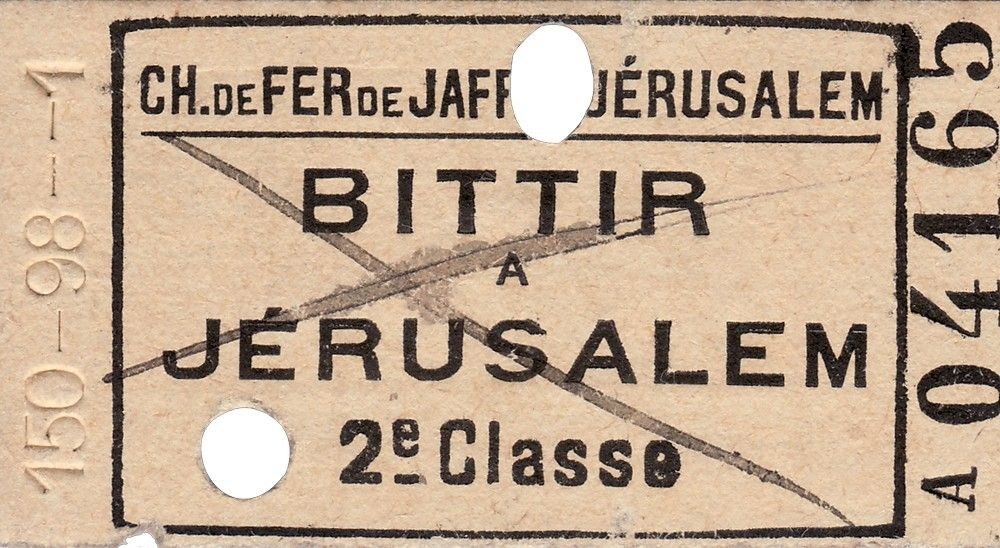
Used ticket, Bittir to Jerusalem (recto, in French)

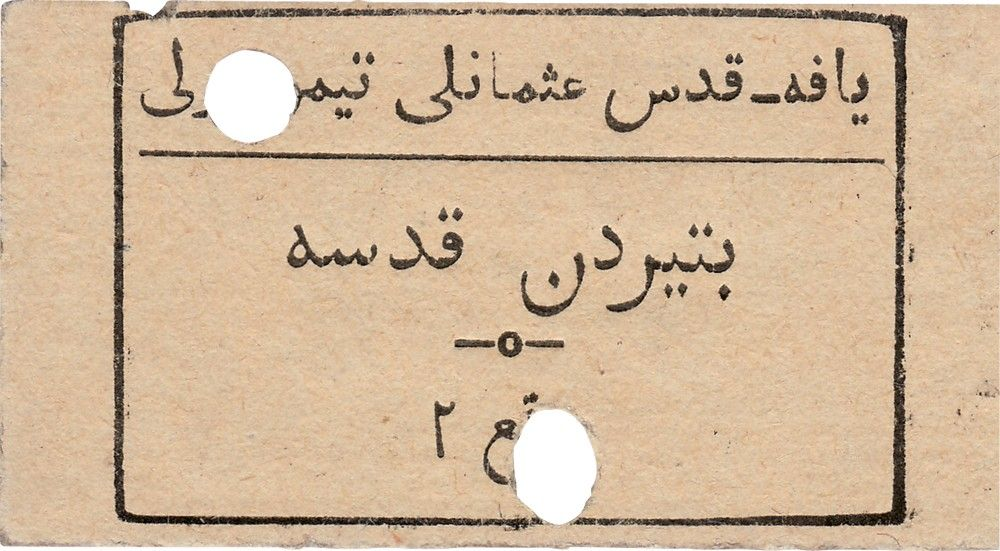
Used ticket (verso, in Ottoman Turkish)

In the 20th century, Battir's development was linked to its location alongside the railroad to Jerusalem, which provided access to the marketplace as well as income from passengers who disembarked to refresh themselves en route.

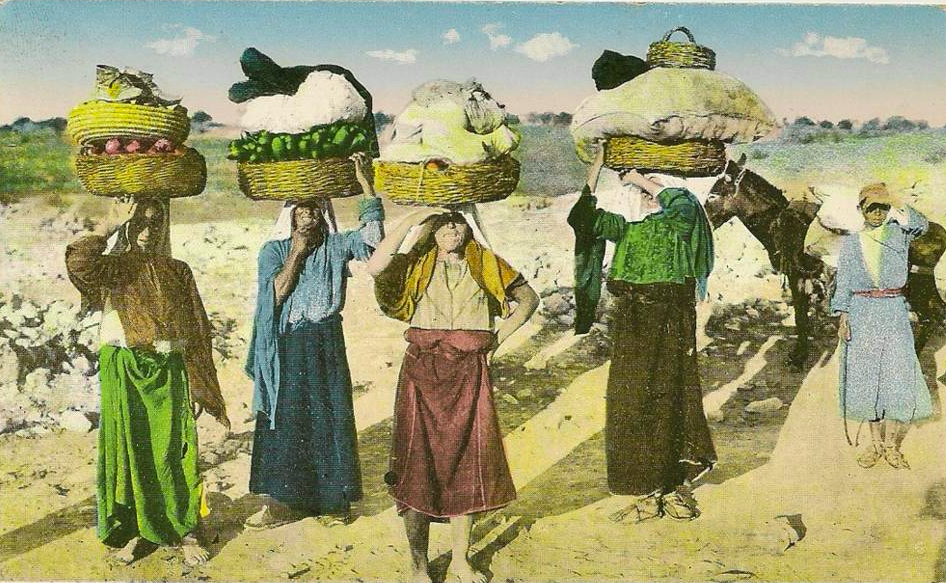
Village women going to market, 1913

=== British Mandate period ===
In the 1922 census of Palestine, conducted by the British Mandate authorities, Batir had an all Muslim population of 542 persons, increasing in the 1931 census to 758; 755 Muslims, two Christians and one Jew, in 172 houses.

In the 1945 statistics the population of Battir was 1,050, all Muslims, with a total of 8,028 dunams of land according to an official land and population survey. Of this, 1,805 dunams were plantations and irrigable land, 2,287 for cereals, while 73 dunams were built-up (urban) land.

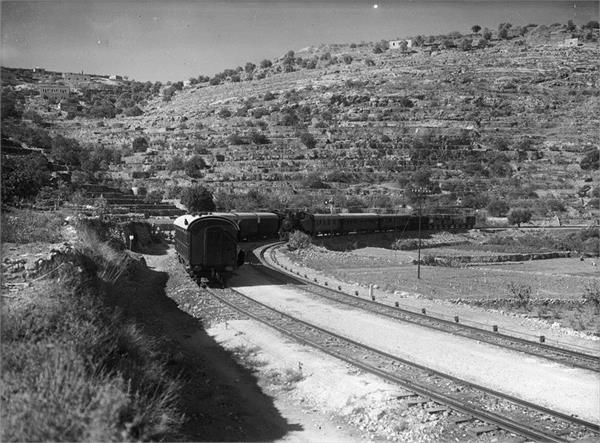
Battir train station 1934

=== Jordanian period ===
During the 1948 war, most of the villagers had fled, but Mustafa Hassan and a few others stayed. At night they would light candles in the houses, and in the morning they would take out the cattle. When nearing the village, the Israelis thought Battir was still inhabited and gave up attacking. The Green line armistice line was drawn between the railroad and the main part of the village, with Battir ending up just meters from Jordan's border with Israel on the Jordanian side. At least 30% of Battir's land lies on the Israeli side of the Green Line, as well as a few of its buildings, but the villagers were allowed to keep it in return for preventing damage to the railway, thus being the only Palestinians officially allowed to cross into Israel and work their lands before the Six-Day War. The parts of Battir falling on the Israeli side of the Green Line are officially within the territorial jurisdiction of the Mateh Yehuda Regional Council but do not have a local committee of their own and the council's authority is not exercised there.

Battir came under Jordanian administration following the 1948 Arab–Israeli War and was annexed by Jordan in 1950.

The Jordanian census of 1961 found 1,321 inhabitants in Battir.

=== Post-1967 ===
Since the Six-Day War in 1967, the status of Battir changed from Jordanian rule on to Israeli occupation. The population in the 1967 census was 1445.

Since the signing of the Oslo II Accord in 1995, Battir has been administered by the Palestinian National Authority (PNA). It is governed by a village council currently administrated by nine members appointed by the PNA. 23.7% of the village's lands were classified as Area B, while the remaining 76.3% were classified as Area C.

In 2007, Battir had a population of 3,967, in 2012 the population was estimated at 4,500. In 2024, Israel approved a new settlement on the UNESCO World Heritage Site, which Peace Now denounced as a threat to Battir's "ancient terraces and sophisticated irrigation systems, evidence of thousands of years of human activity".

== Geography ==
Battir is located 6.4 kilometres (4.0 mi) north-west of Bethlehem on a hill above Wadi el-Jundi (lit. "Valley of the Soldier"), which runs southwest through the Judean hills to the coastal plain.

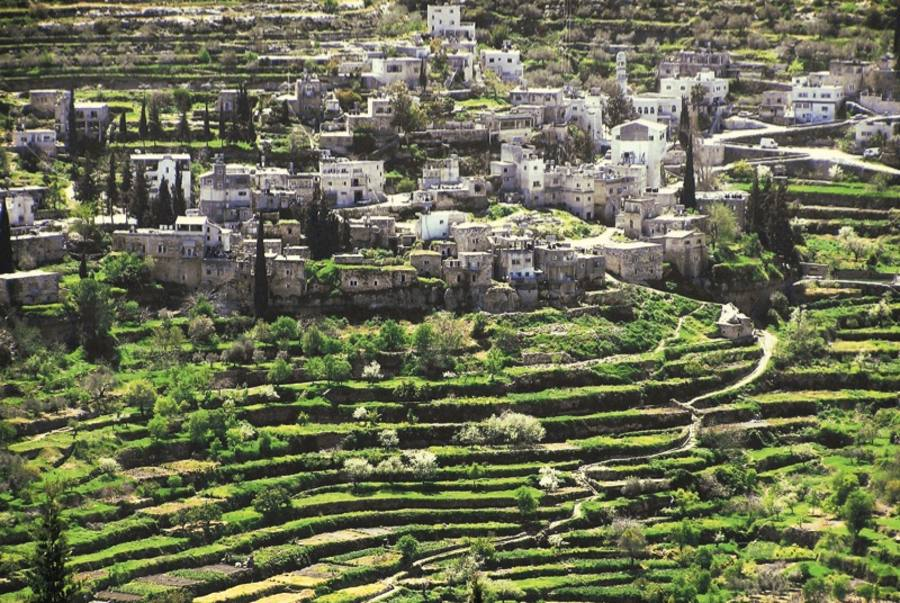
Battir's historical core, surrounded by the ancient terraces

The village's historical core is characterized by its dense structure, surrounded by agricultural terraces. A newer section of Battir extends along the main way to Bethlehem. Ein al-Balad, the village's spring, is encased in a spring house.

The PEF's Survey of Western Palestine in 1883 described the city's natural defenses, saying its houses stand upon rock terraces, having a rocky scarp below; thus from the north the place is very strong, whilst on the south a narrow neck between two ravine heads connects the hill with the main ridge. At an elevation of around 760 metres (2,490 ft) above sea level, Battir's summers are temperate, and its winters mild with occasional snowfall. The average annual temperature is 16^{o} C.

=== Ancient irrigation system and terraces ===
Battir has a unique irrigation system that utilizes man-made terraces (habbai'l) and a system of manually diverting water via sluice gates. The Roman-era network is still in use, fed by seven springs which have provided fresh water for 2,000 years. The irrigation system runs through a steep valley near the Green Line where a section of the Ottoman-era Hejaz Railway was laid. Battir's eight main clans take turns each day to water the village's crops. Hence a local saying that in Battir "a week lasts eight days, not seven." According to anthropologist Giovanni Sontana of UNESCO, "There are few, if any, places left in the immediate region where such a traditional method of agriculture remains, not only intact, but as a functioning part of the village."

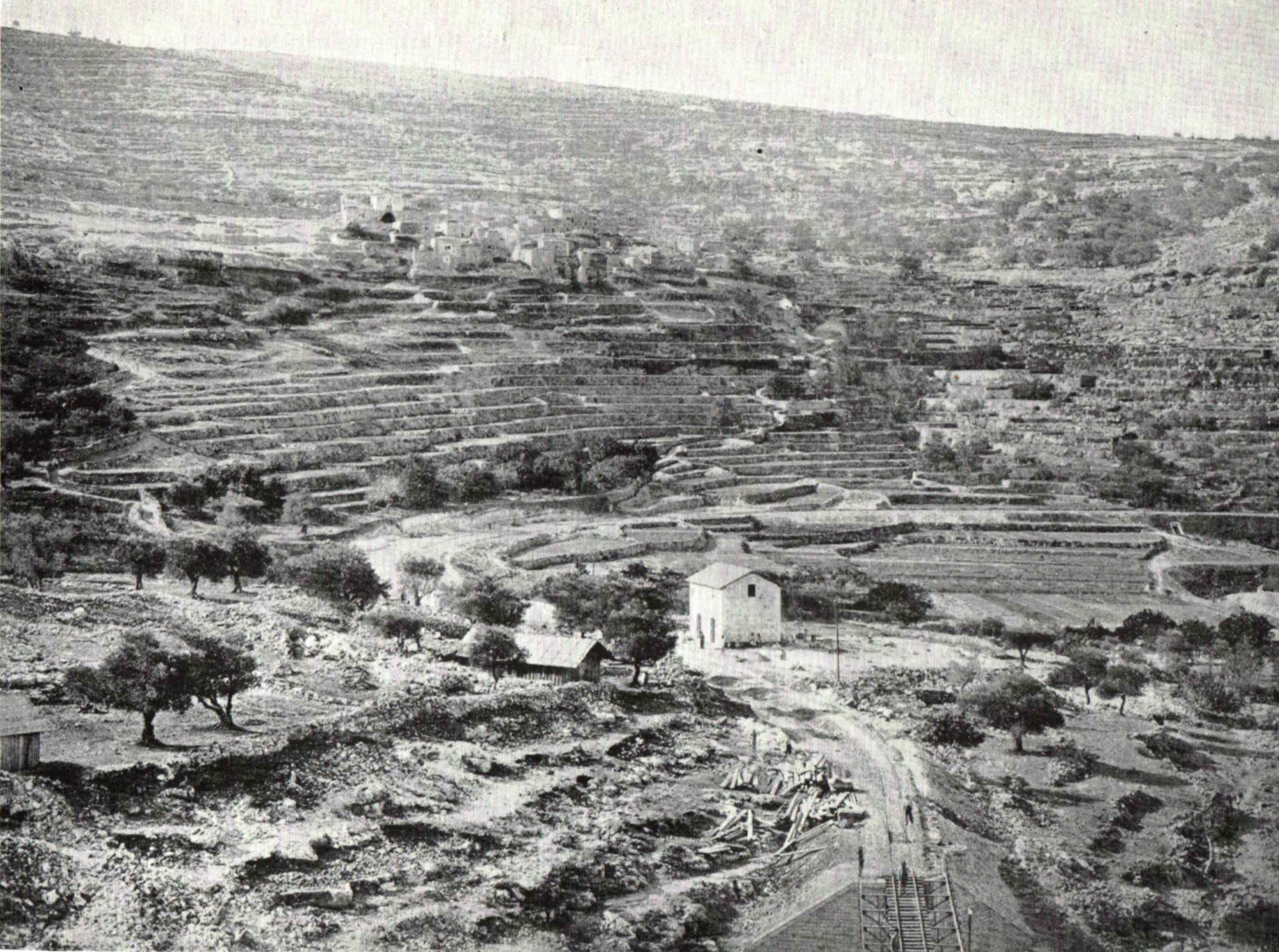
Battir's ancient terraces, 1893

In 2007, the village of Battir sued the Israeli Defense Ministry to try to force them to change the planned route of the Israeli West Bank barrier which would cut through part of Battir's 2,000-year-old irrigation system, which is still in use. The Israel Nature and Parks Authority (INPA), which approved the fence's original route in 2005, changed its mind and wrote in a 13-page policy paper that Battir's terraces were also an Israeli heritage site and should be carefully safeguarded, stating that agricultural terraces around Battir attesting to millennia-old methods of farming in the region will be irreversibly harmed by the fence, no matter how narrow its route. It was the first time an Israeli government agency expressed opposition to the construction of a segment of the fence. This affidavit was one of four expert opinions that contended the fence would decimate the unique farming system, and in early May 2013, the Israeli High Court of Justice ruled that the Defense Ministry must explain “why should the route of the separation barrier in the Battir village area not be nullified or changed, and alternately why should the barrier not be reconfigured.” The Defense Ministry had to submit a new plan for securing the border that will not destroy Battir by July 2, 2013. A separate petition against the separation barrier was also filed by the nearby Jewish city Beitar Illit, fearing that it would prevent them from expanding the settlement.

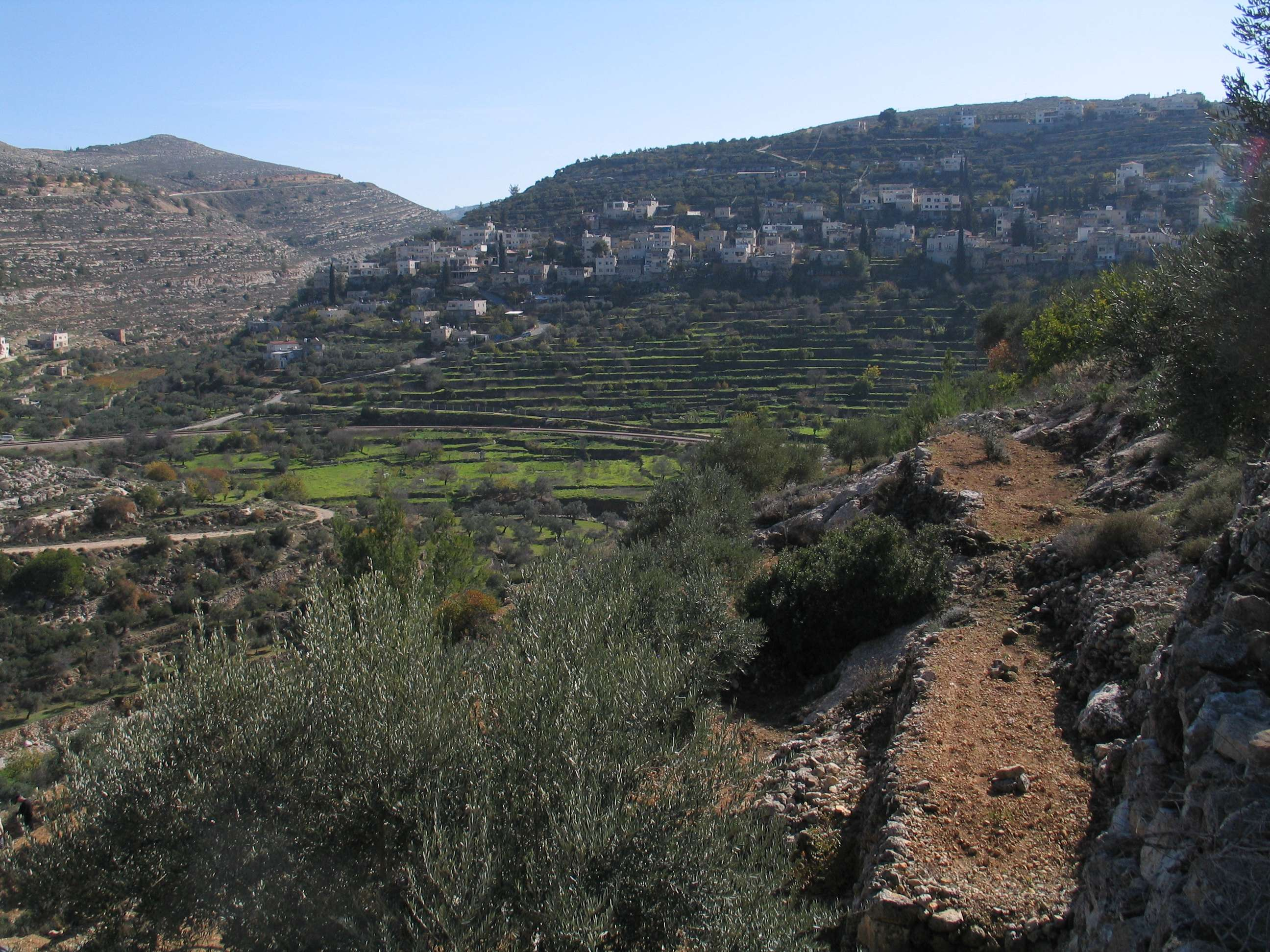
View of Battir

In 2011 UNESCO awarded Battir a $15,000 prize for "Safeguarding and Management of Cultural Landscapes" due to its care for its ancient terraces and irrigation system.

In May 2012, the Palestinian National Authority sent a delegation to UNESCO headquarters in Paris to discuss the possibility of adding Battir to its World Heritage List. The PNA's deputy minister of tourism, Hamadan Taha, said that the organization wants to "maintain it as a Palestinian and humanitarian heritage," making special note of its historic terraces and irrigation systems. the nomination of Battir was blocked at the last minute because the formal submission was too late. In a document concerning the damage the separation barrier would do to the area, the Israel Nature and Parks Authority (INPA) noted "The struggle of our neighbors to name the area a World Heritage Site places us in an embarrassing position, and we should work together with them to protect the landscape." The area was designated a World Heritage Site in the State of Palestine in 2014.

In January 2015, according to the village mayor Akram Badir, the Israeli Supreme Court rejected the IDF request to build the separation barrier through the village

== Culture and cuisine ==
Battir is renowned for its distinctive local eggplant variety, known as the Battiri eggplant or "Bitinjan Battiri" to Palestinians. This elongated eggplant features a light purple hue and seedless, soft white flesh, and is a key ingredient in Palestinian dishes such as Maqluba. Battir is also known for its khyar abyad, a white cucumber grown in the village and in nearby Wadi Fukin.

Every summer, Battir hosts the Eggplant Festival, an event dedicated to supporting local producers and farmers, and celebrating the cultivation of the renowned Battiri eggplants.

== Demography ==
Among the residents of Battir village are members of the Abu 'Ebeid Allah, Abu Ni'ma, Batma, Batha, Kttoush, Mashni, Mu'ammar, and 'Uweina families.

== Archaeology ==
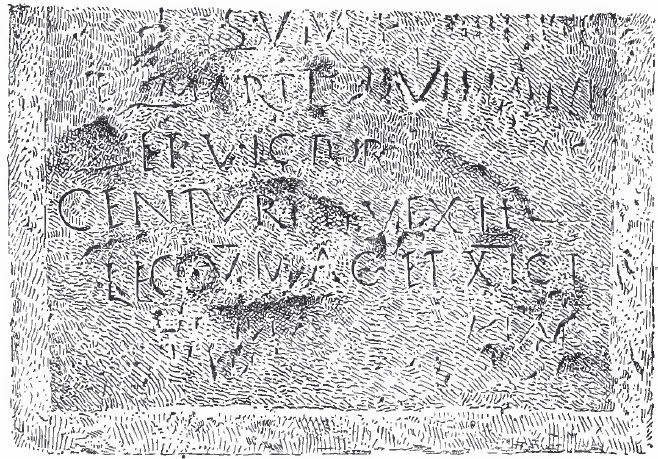
Roman Inscription found near Battir mentioning the 5th and 11th Roman Legions

An old Roman bath fed by a spring is located in the middle of the village.

Archaeologist D. Ussishkin dates the village to the Iron Age, and states that at the time of the Revolt it was a village of between one and two thousand people chosen by Bar Kochba for its spring, defensible hilltop location, and proximity to the main Jerusalem-Gaza road. A Roman inscription was also discovered near one of the city's natural springs on which are inscribed the names of the Fifth Macedonian Legion and the Eleventh Claudian Legion, which said legions presumably took part in the siege of the city during Emperor Hadrian's reign.

There isn't any evidence of habitation in the period immediately after the Revolt.

== Sister cities ==
- Luton, United Kingdom

== Bibliography ==
- Barron, J.B., ed. (1923). Palestine: Report and General Abstracts of the Census of 1922. Government of Palestine.
- Clermont-Ganneau, C.S. (1899). [ARP] Archaeological Researches in Palestine 1873-1874, translated from the French by J. McFarlane. Vol. 1. London: Palestine Exploration Fund.
- Conder, C.R.; Kitchener, H.H. (1883). The Survey of Western Palestine: Memoirs of the Topography, Orography, Hydrography, and Archaeology. Vol. 3. London: Committee of the Palestine Exploration Fund.
- Dauphin, C. (1998). La Palestine byzantine, Peuplement et Populations. BAR International Series 726 (in French). Vol. III : Catalogue. Oxford: Archeopress. ISBN 0-860549-05-4.
- Government of Jordan, Department of Statistics (1964). First Census of Population and Housing. Volume I: Final Tables; General Characteristics of the Population (PDF).
- Government of Palestine, Department of Statistics (1945). Village Statistics, April, 1945.
- Guérin, V. (1869). Description Géographique, Historique et Archéologique de la Palestine. Judee, Vol 1, pt 2, part 1. Paris, Imprimé par autorisation de l'empereur à l'Impr. impériale.
- Hadawi, S. (1970). Village Statistics of 1945: A Classification of Land and Area ownership in Palestine. Palestine Liberation Organization Research Centre.
- Hartmann, M. (1883). "Die Ortschaftenliste des Liwa Jerusalem in dem türkischen Staatskalender für Syrien auf das Jahr 1288 der Flucht (1871)". Zeitschrift des Deutschen Palästina-Vereins. 6: 102–149.
- Hütteroth, W.-D.; Abdulfattah, K. (1977). Historical Geography of Palestine, Transjordan and Southern Syria in the Late 16th Century. Erlanger Geographische Arbeiten, Sonderband 5. Erlangen, Germany: Vorstand der Fränkischen Geographischen Gesellschaft. ISBN 3-920405-41-2.
- Mills, E., ed. (1932). Census of Palestine 1931. Population of Villages, Towns and Administrative Areas. Jerusalem: Government of Palestine.
- Palmer, E.H. (1881). The Survey of Western Palestine: Arabic and English Name Lists Collected During the Survey by Lieutenants Conder and Kitchener, R. E. Transliterated and Explained by E.H. Palmer. Committee of the Palestine Exploration Fund.
- Robinson, E.; Smith, E. (1841). Biblical Researches in Palestine, Mount Sinai and Arabia Petraea: A Journal of Travels in the year 1838. Vol. 2. Boston: Crocker & Brewster.
- Robinson, E.; Smith, E. (1841). Biblical Researches in Palestine, Mount Sinai and Arabia Petraea: A Journal of Travels in the year 1838. Vol. 3. Boston: Crocker & Brewster.
- Schick, C. (1896). "Zur Einwohnerzahl des Bezirks Jerusalem". Zeitschrift des Deutschen Palästina-Vereins. 19: 120–127.
- Socin, A. (1879). "Alphabetisches Verzeichniss von Ortschaften des Paschalik Jerusalem". Zeitschrift des Deutschen Palästina-Vereins. 2: 135–163.
