= Samson and Delilah (1949 film) =

Film by Cecil B. DeMille

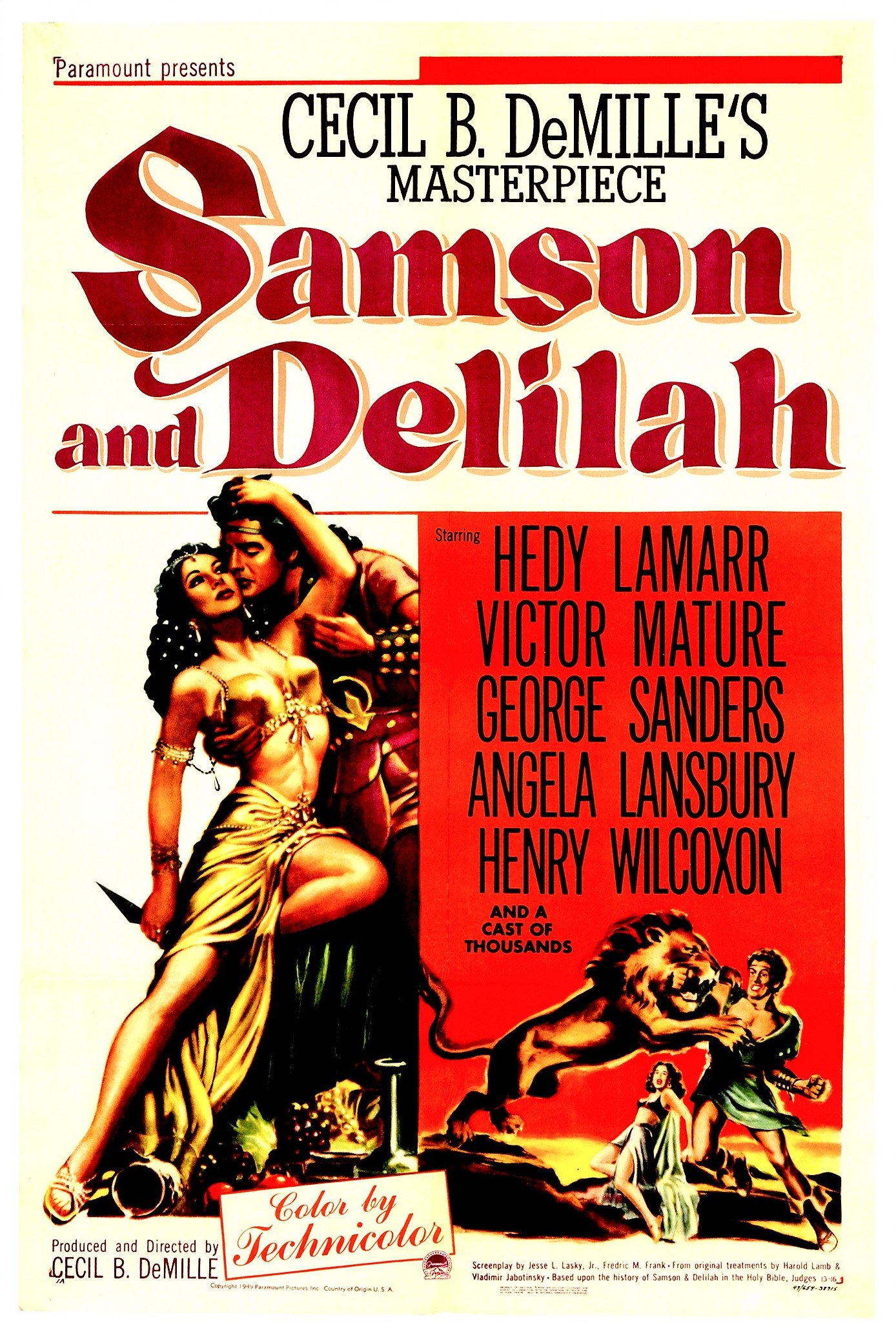
- Original theatrical release poster
- Directed by: Cecil B. DeMille
- Screenplay by: Jesse L. Lasky Jr.; Fredric M. Frank; Harold Lamb
- Based on: Samson the Nazirite 1926 novel by Vladimir Jabotinsky; Holy Bible (Book of Judges)
- Produced by: Cecil B. DeMille
- Starring: Hedy Lamarr; Victor Mature; George Sanders; Angela Lansbury; Henry Wilcoxon
- Cinematography: George Barnes
- Edited by: Anne Bauchens
- Music by: Victor Young
- Color process: Technicolor
- Production company: Paramount Pictures
- Distributed by: Paramount Pictures
- Release dates: December 21, 1949 (New York City); January 13, 1950 (Los Angeles)
- Running time: 134 minutes (with overture and exit music)
- Country: United States
- Language: English
- Budget: $2.9–3.1 million
- Box office: $25.6 million

Samson and Delilah is a 1949 American epic romantic biblical drama film produced and directed by Cecil B. DeMille and released by Paramount Pictures. It depicts the biblical story of Samson, a strongman whose secret lies in his uncut hair, and his love for Delilah, the woman who seduces him, discovers his secret, and then betrays him to the Philistines. It stars Victor Mature and Hedy Lamarr in the title roles, George Sanders as the Saran, Angela Lansbury as Semadar, and Henry Wilcoxon as Prince Ahtur.

Pre-production on Samson and Delilah began as early as 1935, when Harold Lamb wrote an original film treatment based on chapters 13–16 of the biblical Book of Judges. Production was postponed for a decade. DeMille also bought the film rights to Vladimir Jabotinsky's 1926 novel Samson the Nazirite, and the final screenplay was written by Jesse L. Lasky Jr. and Fredric M. Frank. Principal photography officially commenced in 1948.

Upon its release, the film was praised for its Technicolor cinematography, lead performances, costumes, sets, and innovative special effects. After premiering in New York City on December 21, 1949, Samson and Delilah opened in Los Angeles on January 13, 1950. A massive commercial success, it became the highest-grossing film of 1950, and the third highest-grossing film ever at the time of its release. Of its five Academy Award nominations, the film won two for Best Art Direction and Best Costume Design. In 1952, DeMille won the Film français Grand Prix for Best Foreign Film of 1951. (Note: The Grand Prix is a small bronze replica of the Winged Victory of Samothrace displayed at the Louvre Museum.)

== Plot ==
Samson, a Danite Hebrew placed under Nazirite vows from birth by his mother Hazelelponit, is the leader and protector of the Danites, who are under Philistine rule. He plans to marry a Philistine woman named Semadar, who is also being courted by Ahtur, the military governor of Dan. Samson's choice disappoints his mother who wants him to marry another girl named Miriam. While sneaking at Semadar's house before a Philistine lion hunt, Samson meets Semadar's younger sister, Delilah, who is enamored with him. When Samson is left behind by the hunting party, Delilah offers to help him reach the hunting spot first. They ride there together and are accosted by a young lion, whom Samson kills with his bare hands. The Philistine entourage arrives along with the Saran of Gaza and are told by Delilah of Samson's feat. After proving his strength once more by beating the Saran's champion, Samson asks for the Saran's blessing in taking Semadar as his wife. The Saran accepts, disappointing both Delilah and Ahtur.

At the wedding feast, Samson asks his guests a riddle based on his fight with the lion for a wager of thirty garments. Angered by the riddle's difficulty and after being coaxed by Delilah, the guests have Ahtur threaten Semadar to get the answer out of Samson. Semadar succeeds, and the guests humiliate Samson with the answer before the wedding’s conclusion. In anger, Samson goes out and attacks thirty Philistines to strip them of their garments and pay the wager, only to find upon his return that Semadar’s father Tubal had married her off to Ahtur. Tubal offers Delilah as a replacement, but Samson rejects her. When Samson attacks Ahtur in Semadar's chambers, a fight ensues, resulting in the deaths of Semadar and Tubal. Samson swears revenge and leaves to start burning the Philistine fields. An embittered Delilah also vows vengeance for Samson's rejection and the death of her family.

Now a hunted man, Samson continues his vendetta against the Philistines by raiding their caravans. In response, the Saran imposes heavy taxes on the Danites, promising to lift them only if they give up Samson. This works, and the frustrated Danites hand over Samson to Ahtur and a large regiment of Philistine troops. During a stopover en route to Gaza, Samson prays for strength and rips apart his bonds. He topples Ahtur's war chariot and uses a donkey's jawbone to club numerous Philistine soldiers to death.

As the Saran and the Philistine lords ponder how to defeat Samson, Delilah comes up with the idea of seducing him to learn the secret of his superhuman strength and deliver him for punishment in exchange for a large payment of silver. After encountering Samson in the valley of Sorek, Delilah spends days forming a romance with him until she eventually learns that his hair is the source of his strength. She asks him to run away with her but is foiled by the arrival of Miriam and Saul, a young friend of Samson, who tell him that his parents have been captured and tortured by the Philistines. Samson prepares to leave with them, but Delilah subdues him with spiked wine and cuts off his hair. When the weakened Samson awakes, he is captured by Ahtur and the Philistines, who blind him and put him to slave work.

Delilah relishes Samson's downfall at first but becomes remorseful upon finding out that he was blinded. After being tormented by her guilt for weeks, she decides to make amends by visiting Samson in prison, where they learn that his strength has returned. After the two of them reconcile, Delilah offers to spirit Samson away, but he learns that he will be brought to the temple of Dagon the next day as part of his public humiliation and torture. He decides to stay and warns Delilah not to come to the temple.

Despite Samson's warning, Delilah attends the feast at the temple, where Samson is brought out in front of a massive Philistine crowd. Miriam arrives with Saul and begs the Saran and Delilah in vain for Samson's freedom. Under the pretense of humiliating him, Delilah guides Samson to the temple's two main pillars at his behest. Once he stands between them, he tells Delilah to flee, but she remains, unseen by him, as he prays for strength and pushes the pillars apart. The pillars give way and the temple collapses, burying Samson, Delilah, the Saran, and hundreds of Philistines under the rubble. Saul and Miriam mourn Samson's death, remarking that "men will tell his story for a thousand years."

== Cast ==
- Hedy Lamarr as Delilah
- Victor Mature as Samson
- George Sanders as The Saran of Gaza
- Angela Lansbury as Semadar
- Henry Wilcoxon as Prince Ahtur
- Olive Deering as Miriam
- Fay Holden as Hazelelponit
- Julia Faye as Hisham
- Russ Tamblyn as Saul
- William Farnum as Tubal
- Lane Chandler as Teresh
- Moroni Olsen as Targil
- Francis McDonald as Storyteller
- Wee Willie Davis as Garmiskar
- John Miljan as Lesh Lakish
- Arthur Q. Bryan as Fat Philistine Merchant
- Laura Elliot as Spectator
- Victor Varconi as Lord of Ashdod
- John Parrish as Lord of Gath
- Frank Wilcox as Lord of Ekron
- Russell Hicks as Lord of Ashkelon
- Boyd Davis as First Priest
- Fritz Leiber as Lord Sharif
- Mike Mazurki as Leader of Philistine Soldiers
- Davison Clark as Merchant Prince
- George Reeves as Wounded Messenger
- Pedro de Cordoba as Bar Simon
- Frank Reicher as Village Barber
- Colin Tapley as Prince
- Charles Evans as Manoah (uncredited)
- Harry Woods as Gammad (uncredited)
- Gordon Richards as Guide (uncredited)
- Cecil B. DeMille as Narrator (uncredited)
- Tanner the Lion as Lion (uncredited)

== Production ==
=== Development ===
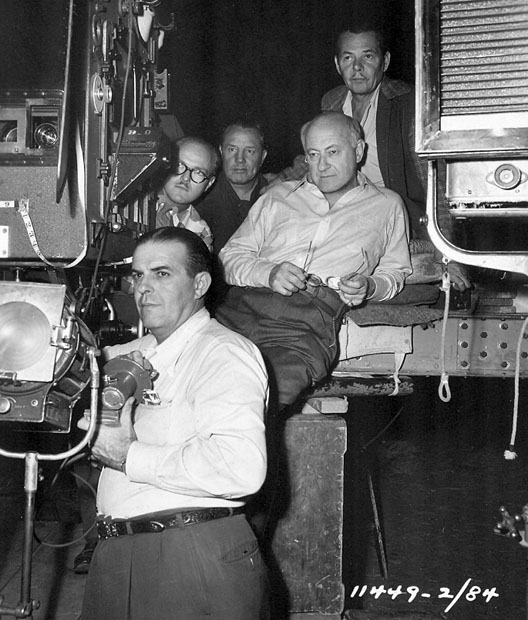
Cecil B. DeMille (seated, center) on the set of the film with cinematographer George Barnes behind him.

In late March 1934, Miriam Hopkins and Henry Wilcoxon were said to be DeMille's choices to play Samson and Delilah. In April, Paramount Pictures announced that its next "big picture" and DeMille's follow-up to Cleopatra (1934) would be Samson and Delilah. The film was eventually postponed and DeMille decided to produce and direct The Crusades (1935).

In May 1935, Motion Picture Daily informed that Samson and Delilah was "slated to start five weeks after the completion of The Crusades." Paramount bought the film rights to the music and libretto of the 1877 opera Samson et Dalila. DeMille paid $10,000 to historian Harold Lamb to write a film treatment of the biblical story of Samson and Delilah, which DeMille regarded as "one of the greatest love stories of all time." Jeanie MacPherson was also hired to do research and collaborate with Lamb on the screenplay. In July, Parsons reported that the director wanted to borrow James Cagney from Warner Bros. for the role of Samson. The film was expected to run two hours or more. In October, DeMille borrowed a $40,000 library of Bible history from a Boston library and started working on the script on his yacht with Lamb and MacPherson. In November, actresses Dolores del Río, Paulette Goddard, and Joan Crawford were suggested for the part of Delilah, a role Grace Bradley wanted to play and also campaigned for.

By February 1936, DeMille had plans for two new films, Samson and Delilah and The Plainsman, and was also negotiating a new contract with Paramount. He considered filming Samson and Delilah in the new three-strip Technicolor. In April, DeMille thought dancer Sally Rand could be "the perfect beautiful brute" as Delilah. In October, after the release of The Plainsman, DeMille signed a new contract with Paramount and said he was making a deal with Charles Bickford for Samson and had asked Claudette Colbert to play Delilah. In November, DeMille and Paramount planned to film Samson and Delilah the following year. In December, the film was "indefinitely" shelved and DeMille started pre-production work on The Buccaneer.

Nine years later, on August 15, 1946, DeMille publicly stated that Samson and Delilah would be his next project after Unconquered (1947). DeMille later recalled in his autobiography that the Paramount executives had doubts about financing a "Sunday school tale." They approved the project when DeMille showed them a sketch by artist Dan Groesbeck depicting a "big, brawny" Samson and a "slim and ravishingly attractive" Delilah. He initially planned to film it in 1947, but in October 1947, he said he would produce the film the following year with a "budget to be based on the anticipated world gross at that time."

In spring of 1948, DeMille hired illustrator Henry Clive to paint the "ideal Delilah" on canvas. He had studied paintings of Delilah by Peter Paul Rubens, Rembrandt, Gustave Doré, and Solomon Joseph Solomon, but wanted her to look modern. DeMille said his Delilah "must have a dangerous capacity for vengeance. Warm, soft, cunning. A combination of Vivien Leigh and Jean Simmons with a dash of Lana Turner." In July, he hired Henry Noerdlinger as a research coordinator.

=== Writing ===
Samson and Delilah is based on chapters 13, 14, 15, and 16 of the Book of Judges. These four chapters tell the story of Samson, one of the judges of Israel. Samson's origin and Nazarite status are described in chapter 13. An angel announced Samson's birth to his mother: "For, lo, thou shalt conceive, and bear a son; and no razor shall come on his head: for the child shall be a Nazarite unto God from the womb: and he shall begin to deliver Israel out of the hand of the Philistines." Although chapter 13 is not depicted in the film, it is alluded to when Samson says, "A long time ago, I was dedicated to Him. Many of the vows, I've broken, but one I've kept." In chapter 14, Samson falls in love with and marries an unnamed Philistine woman from Timnath, but after she provokes Samson's anger by revealing the answer to his riddle, her father gives her to Samson's friend. In chapter 15, Samson's father-in-law, the Timnite, offers his unnamed younger daughter as a new bride, but Samson rejects her and burns the crops of the Philistines; the Philistines retaliate and burn Samson's wife and her father. In chapter 16, it is said that Samson "loved a woman in the valley of Sorek, whose name was Delilah", but she discovers the secret of his great strength and betrays him to the Philistines.

Harold Lamb began writing an early version of the screenplay in 1935. For more than ten years, DeMille struggled to find "the one thread that would tie together the separate incidents in Samson's life as it is recorded in the Bible." He found it in Samson the Nazarite, a "little-known" novel by Russian-Jewish author Vladimir Jabotinsky. Jabotinsky combined Delilah and the younger sister of Samson's wife into one person. DeMille wrote that this "simple, plausible, and entirely legitimate device" turned the Samson narrative into a drama and also gave Delilah "a motive to destroy him, more powerful, more burning, than the merely mercenary one of the bribe offered her by the Philistines." He bought the screen rights to the book.

We changed nothing in the Bible, nothing at all. But we have done one important thing—we have given a name to the younger daughter [of Samson's father-in-law]. In the Bible she has no name. We have called her Delilah. And it was when we realized that we could do this that I knew the picture could be made. […]

The Bible does not say what became of the younger sister. It does not say that she was burned along with her father and Samson's wife. We bought Jabotinsky's book for just that one thing, that made possible a connected drama of "Samson and Delilah." The Bible does not say Delilah was the younger sister. It introduces her much later as a woman Samson loved. But she could have been the younger sister.

— Cecil B. DeMille

DeMille's first story conference with his screenwriters occurred on July 19, 1946. On that day DeMille dictated his outline of the biblical story; he read Samson's chapters in the Book of Judges and gave his interpretation of every verse. Jesse L. Lasky Jr. and Fredric M. Frank completed the 186-page script on September 7, 1948. After reading the screenplay, Hedy Lamarr autographed Lasky's copy: "Jesse, I hope I do justice to your Delilah—Good luck to both of us!"

Despite the renown of this iconic biblical story depicting their battle against the Philistines, the oppressed people represented by Samson are never once referred to as "Israelites", "Hebrews" or "Jewish" people. They are referred to only as "Danites", inhabitants of the Land of Dan. This omission—or avoidance—occurred in the early days of the witch hunt into Communist—often Jewish—influence when Hollywood studio chiefs were very sensitive to the fact that the film industry was generally considered to be run by Jews.

=== Casting ===
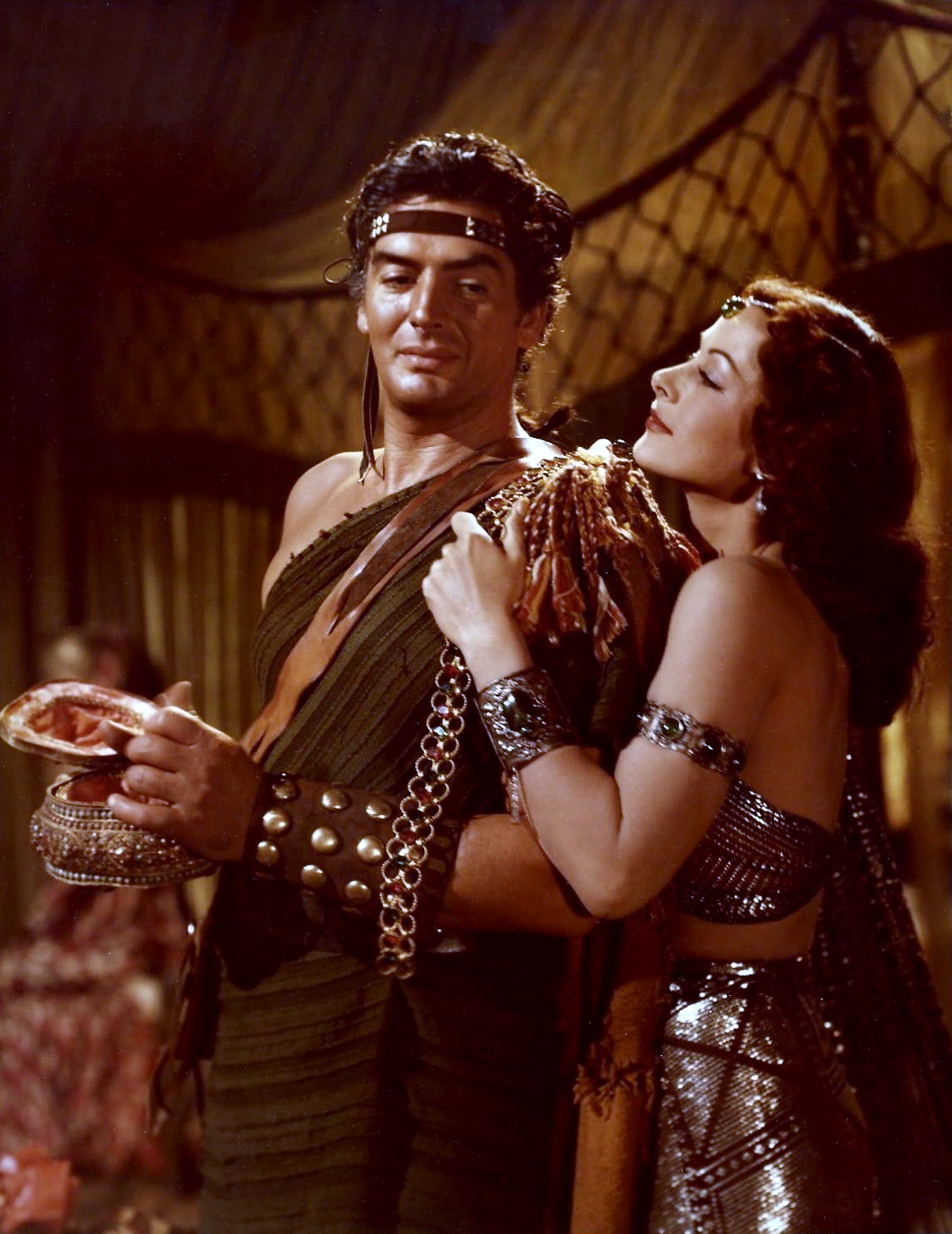
Samson (Mature) and Delilah (Lamarr) inside Delilah's tent at the Valley of Sorek.

In 1946, Henry Wilcoxon asked DeMille to consider a then-unknown Burt Lancaster for the role of Samson. DeMille stated, "For Samson, I want a combination Tarzan, Robin Hood, and Superman." In August 1947, columnist Hedda Hopper suggested James Mason. As early as December 1947, DeMille informed that he wanted to borrow Victor Mature from 20th Century-Fox for the role. In January 1948, columnist Erskine Johnson reported that Mature was one of DeMille's candidates for the role. Bodybuilder Steve Reeves made a screen test in New York on January 10. DeMille ordered Reeves to lose 15 pounds and rehearse skits with other actors, but Reeves managed to lose only seven pounds and his acting did not convince DeMille. After auditioning Reeves twice in early March, DeMille decided that Reeves was an "impossible" choice for the role. In June 1948, after an 18-month search initially for an unknown "athletic young man", DeMille chose Mature after admiring his performance in the film Kiss of Death (1947).

DeMille and his staff considered many film stars of various nationalities for the role of Delilah. (Note: The list included Lucille Ball, Jeanne Crain, Linda Darnell, Ava Gardner, Greer Garson, Jane Greer, Susan Hayward, Jennifer Jones, Viveca Lindfors, Patricia Neal, Maureen O'Hara, Nancy Olson, Gail Russell, Märta Torén, and Alida Valli.) In September 1947, he said he wanted to cast Hedy Lamarr in the role. She first caught his attention in 1939, when he planned a film starring her as the Jewish queen Esther. He had also worked with her on Lux Radio Theatre. In December, he was thinking about giving the part to Rhonda Fleming but thought she was "too nice" for it. In January 1948, DeMille's assistants voted Vivien Leigh the "perfect Delilah"; he attempted to hire her but found out she was very ill. That same month, Ruth Roman made a screen test. In March, Jean Simmons visited Hollywood and talked with DeMille about the role, but J. Arthur Rank vetoed the idea of loaning her to DeMille. (Note: Simmons said, "Besides, I was only 18. I was too young to play such a wise and alluring woman.") In April, DeMille was "seriously considering" Lizabeth Scott and also tried to borrow Lana Turner from MGM or Rita Hayworth from Columbia. Hedda Hopper recommended Ann Sheridan, who "would make a luscious one." By early June, DeMille had interviewed several actresses, including Lamarr and Sheridan. He had an idea of what he was looking for in the actress: "For Delilah . . . a sort of distilled Jean Simmons and Vivien Leigh, with a generous touch of Lana Turner."

All the muscle men in the world came out to see me. I needed a spiritual quality for the part, not a physical instructor. So I chose Victor Mature. I had seen Hedy Lamarr in Tortilla Flat and there was where I became interested in her as Delilah.

— Cecil B. DeMille, in Mark Barron's Broadway column

On June 19, 1948, the press announced that DeMille chose Hedy Lamarr. According to co-star Henry Wilcoxon, Lamarr (who was of Jewish descent, as was DeMille himself on his mother's side) won the role of Delilah after DeMille saw her film The Strange Woman (1946). Erskine Johnson revealed that Lamarr's portrayal of Tondelayo in White Cargo (1942) ultimately convinced DeMille to hire her. Maria Montez wanted to play Delilah and was reportedly "so disappointed" that Lamarr got the role. Yvonne De Carlo "cried into her tea cup" when Lamarr was cast and said, "[DeMille] told me two years ago that when he made the movie I would get the part." He was content with Lamarr's performance as Delilah, describing it as "more than skin-deep." He also described her as "a gazelle–incapable of a clumsy or wrong move", and she would flirtatiously refer to herself as "Delilah" and DeMille as her "Samson."

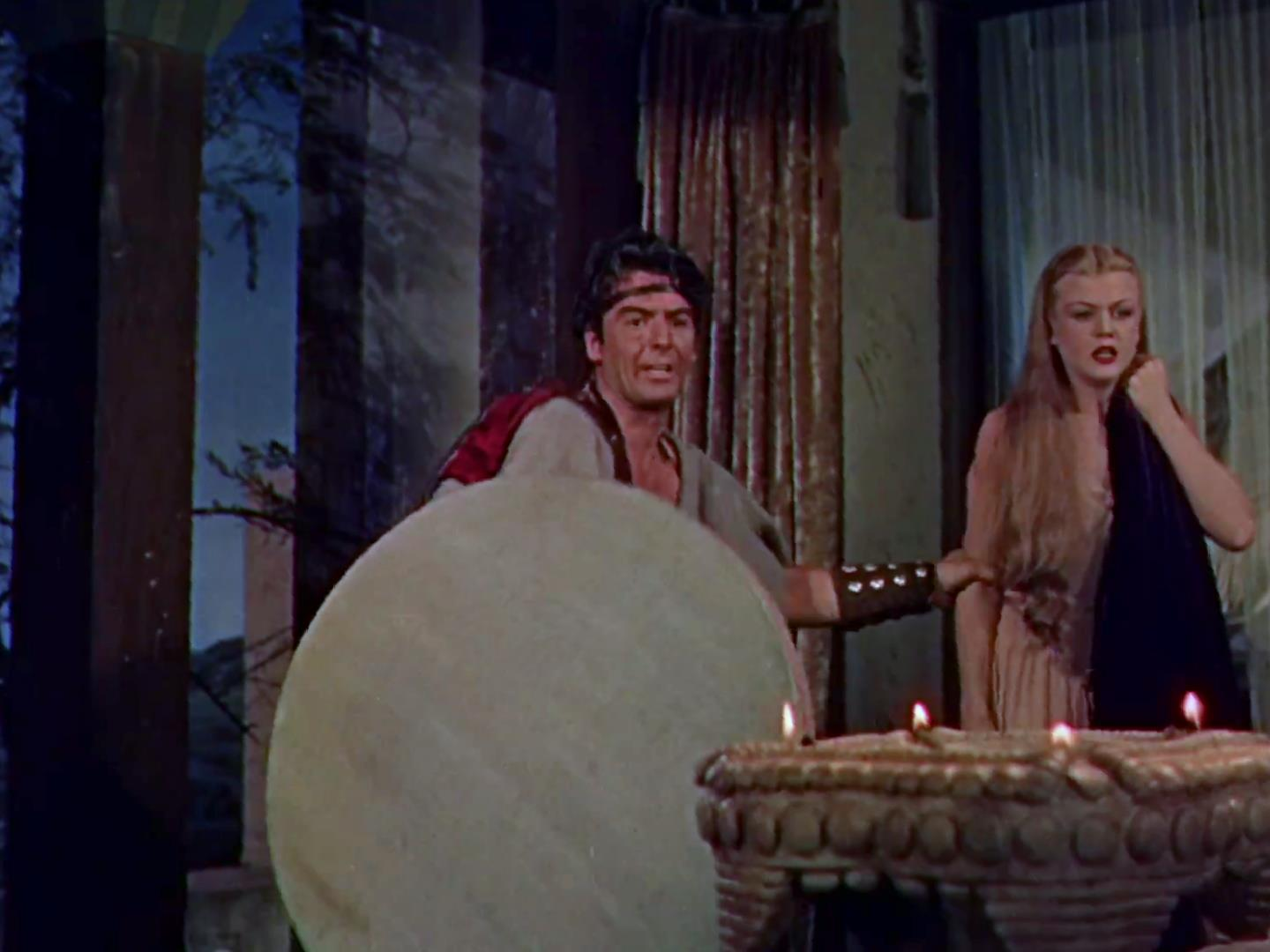
Angela Lansbury plays Samson's "golden-haired" wife and Delilah's older sister, Semadar

DeMille considered Madeleine Carroll, Rhonda Fleming, and Anna Sten for the role of Semadar, Delilah's older sister. In July 1948, he gave the role to Phyllis Calvert, but she relinquished the part due to illness. DeMille saw Angela Lansbury in Frank Capra's State of the Union and cast her in the role in September. He chose Lansbury because he saw her as a beautiful and sexy young woman, even though she was playing older roles at the time. "He disregarded all my past performances", she said. Lansbury credited DeMille with discovering her sex appeal. When reporter Lawrence Perry interviewed Lansbury on September 24, 1949, he told her that the Bible does not describe Delilah as having a sister. She replied, "Anyway, if Delilah didn't have a sister, Mr. DeMille has supplied one." In a 2004 documentary about DeMille, Lansbury stated, "What a luck it was to be asked to be in a Cecil B. DeMille movie! He was enough of a legend in my time for me to be enormously impressed at being asked."

For the role of Miriam, Paramount considered several of its Irish-American contract players but DeMille insisted on hiring a Jewish actress. Kasey Rogers auditioned and was screen-tested for the role. But DeMille told her, "You're too pretty and you're too young", and Rogers was cast as a Philistine spectator in the temple scene and credited in the film as Laura Elliot. (Note: Rogers was given a close-up and two lines: "Why can't I lead you like that?" and "It [the column] moved!") DeMille continued his search. One day, Lasky received a phone call from his friend Olive Deering, a "superb actress" of Jewish origin. Deering had recently arrived in California and needed a job, so Lasky took her to DeMille's office and advised her to look Jewish. "That's a relief," she responded. "For most parts they say I look too Jewish!" DeMille looked at Deering with a spotlight, showed her sketches and props, and described the role to her. When the interview ended, Henry Wilcoxon entered the office and DeMille told him, "I think we've found our Miriam, Henry." Lasky wrote, "And so we had. Olive could hardly have been better. A thorough professional, imbued with her role, she moved through the Hollywood sets like a daughter of Dan, the perfect foil for Hedy's dashing Delilah." In his autobiography, DeMille spoke highly of Deering: "[…] among the several featured players who gave excellent performances [in the film] was one whose talent and dedication to her art should carry her very far in the theater, whether on screen or stage, Olive Deering, who played Miriam, the Danite girl who loved Samson to the end of his life and beyond." Deering received sixth billing after the five main stars.

William "Wee Willie" Davis, a local professional wrestler, was cast in the role of Garmiskar, the Saran's wrestler who fights Samson. He was described as "seven feet tall and, with his costume on, tops the scales 350 pounds."

=== Art direction and set design ===
Artist Ken Reid made concept paintings of many scenes and shots in the film. These include depictions of Semadar's bridal suite, Samson entering Delilah's tent, the Saran's throne room, the temple procession, the tax collector, Samson being led by the Philistines and the jester, and Samson fighting the Philistines with a donkey's jawbone. Another artist named Carlo made charcoal and watercolor sketches of the jawbone sequence, for which Reid also provided storyboards.

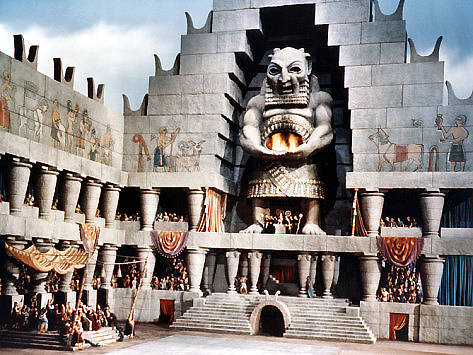
The 37-foot tall model of the temple of Dagon.

Judges 16 describes Dagon's temple as having "two middle pillars upon which the house stood, and on which it was borne up". It also says that "the house was full of men and women; and all the lords of the Philistines were there; and there were upon the roof about three thousand men and women, that beheld while Samson made sport." DeMille and his crew had to design a structure that would collapse without the support of two pillars. Construction of the set was based on the description of a similar building and its collapse in the writings of 1st-century Roman author Pliny the Elder. The temple set is a mixture of Sumerian and Minoan styles of architecture. Its Minoan elements are the Horns of Consecration and the inverted columns. Scenes from a Sumerian artifact known as the Standard of Ur were painted on the upper part of the temple walls.

=== Costume design ===
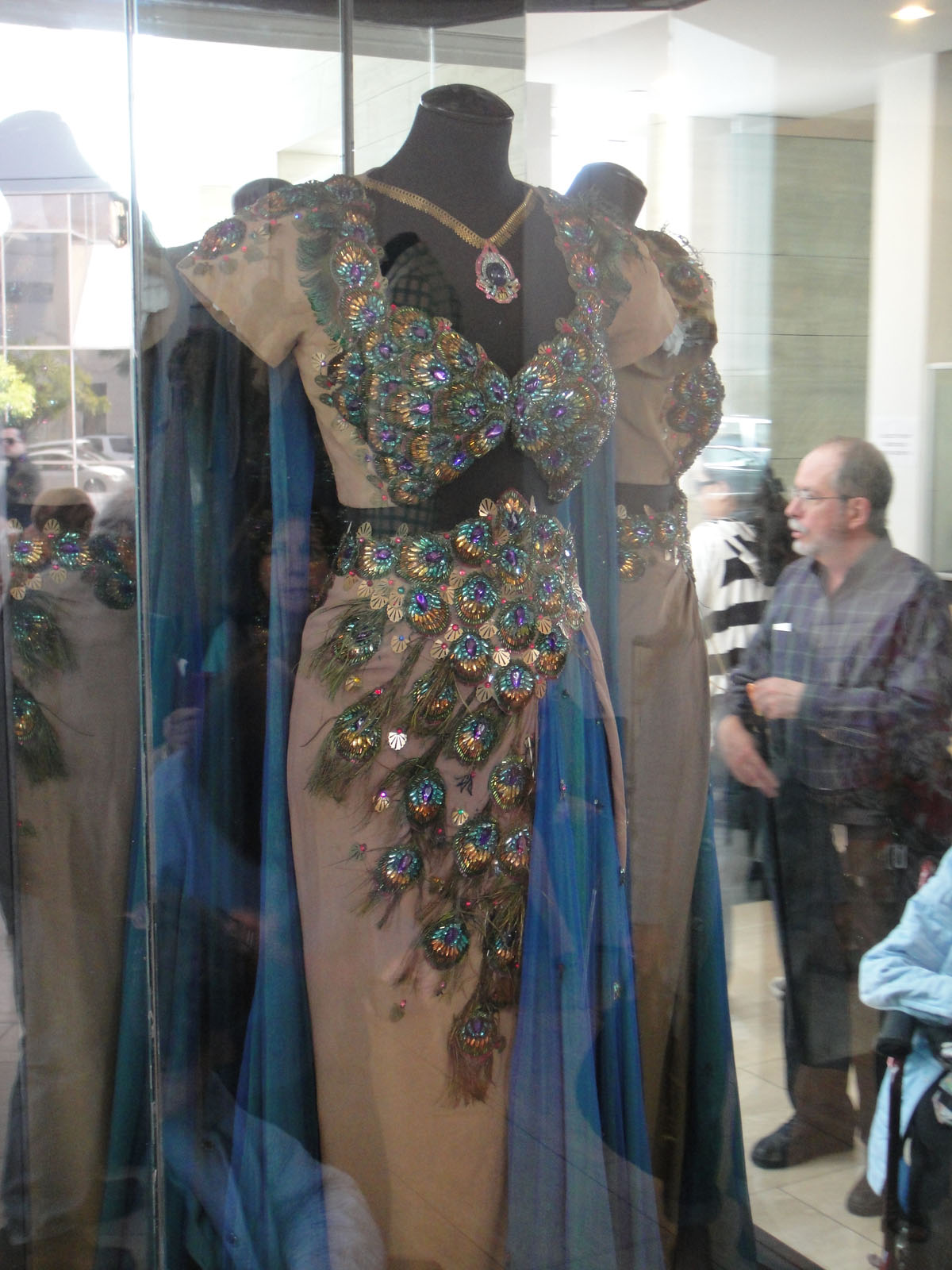
The film's Academy Award-winning costumes include this peacock gown and cape designed by Edith Head and worn by Delilah (Lamarr) at the temple of Dagon.

Edith Head designed the costumes of Delilah and Semadar, Gile Steele and Elois Jenssen created the outfits for the leading male characters, and Dorothy Jeakins and Gwen Wakeling worked on the rest of the cast. DeMille requested color sketches of the designs and then made large color prints of them to compare them with the finished costume.

Hedy Lamarr found Head's sketches for Delilah too voluptuous: "I'm not a big bosomy woman; if you pad me I'll look ridiculous. I won't be able to act. I'll feel as if I'm carting balloons." Head's solution was to suggest voluptuousness through lines and drapery. She later remembered that DeMille smiled when he saw Lamarr dressed in Head's "lovely" costume of "mesh and beaten silver". Delilah's silver gown reportedly weighed 40 pounds. Columnist Harrison Carroll went to the set to interview Lamarr and she told him, "Feel the weight of it. I've been wearing it all morning. I didn't want to get it dirty between scenes so I took it off. Besides it is very heavy. My whole body is tired from it."

For Delilah's last costume in the temple scene, Head sketched Lamarr "in peacock blues and greens with a long flowing cape to suggest the bird." Head's initial design did not include any peacock feathers because they were "almost impossible to get." She also thought it would be very difficult to make a gown of them. DeMille told Head to look at a picture of Lady Curzon's peacock dress, which "caused a sensation" at the 1903 Delhi Durbar. He said, "It was made entirely—of peacock feathers! If they could do it then, we can do it now. I'll supply the feathers." DeMille raised peacocks at his ranch and collected fallen feathers during the weekend. He drove to the studio in a station wagon filled with peacock feathers. Head believed that her Academy Award for Best Costume Design (Color) was in large part due to the "magnificent dress that transformed Hedy into the most exotic of birds".

Several costumes used in the film originated from Morocco, including traditional caftans.

=== Filming ===
Principal photography began on October 4, 1948 and ended on December 22, 1948. The scenes involving the plowed field were shot on January 4, 1949, and added scenes and closeups were shot between January 18 and January 21, 1949.

In late October 1948, Hedda Hopper visited the set of the film and described it as "harmonious, peaceful, and full of love." She reported that DeMille awarded Mature one of his special "50-cent pieces" for "doing a dramatic scene well." Lamarr told Hopper that she had "just been waiting for DeMille and Technicolor", while DeMille said Lamarr was "unbelievably beautiful". Another columnist, Virginia MacPherson, wrote an article in which she detailed the informal, irreverent way Mature treated DeMille on the set. When Mature muffed a scene and DeMille complained, Mature talked back: "Take it easy, Bud. You can't replace me, y'know. Where else in town could you get anything this big who can talk." Mature said DeMille eventually found his retorts amusing: "Didn't know how to take me, at first. He just stood there. Now he laughs."

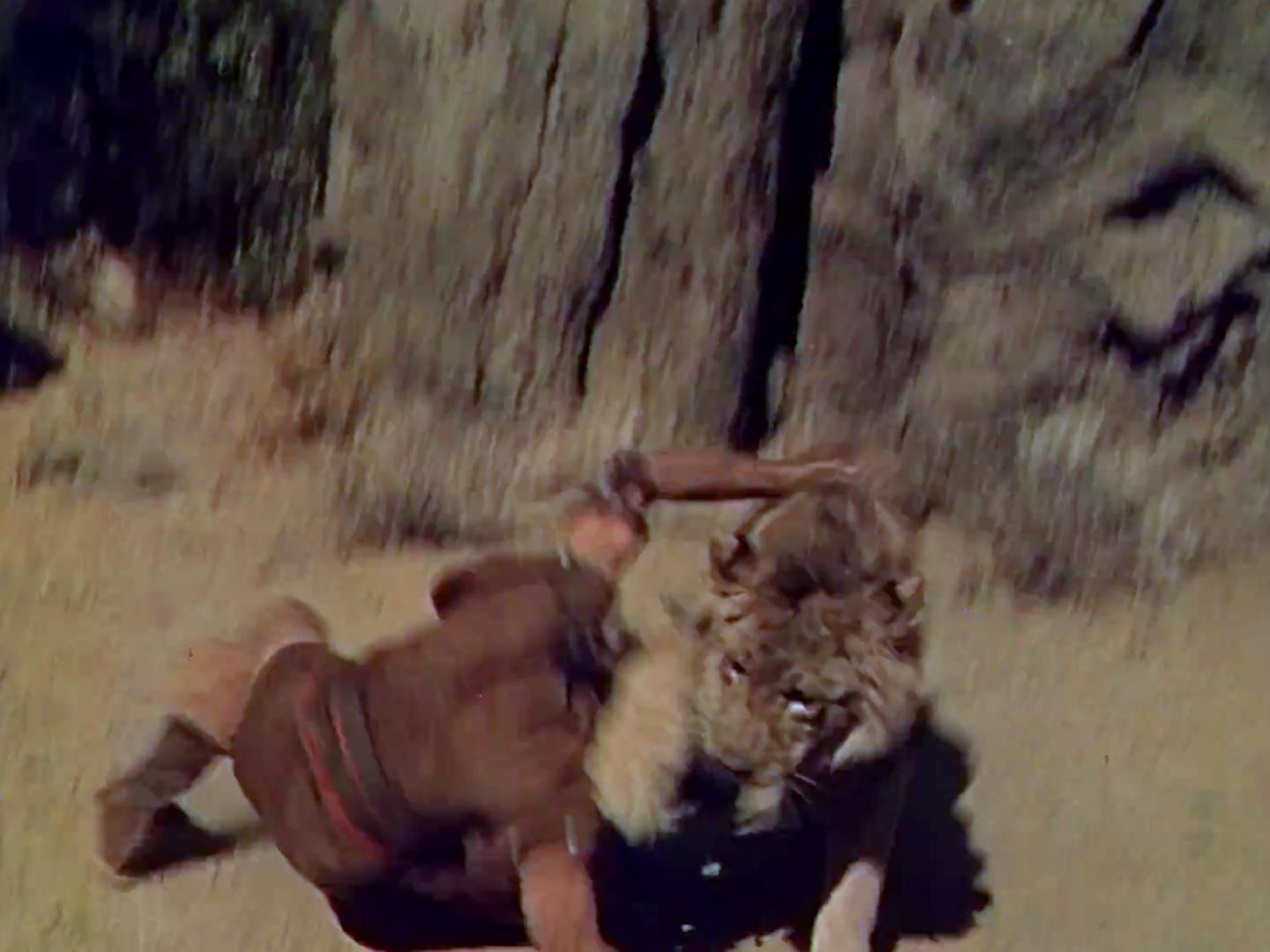
Victor Mature's double fought the lion.

For an early scene with Hedy Lamarr, DeMille originally wanted Mature to fight the lion barehanded in the full shot, but Mature refused and a stunt man performed the scene. Mature appears in the close-ups with a stunt man wearing a lion's skin. After the film's premiere, DeMille revealed that Mature's double "got a dreadful clawing down his arm which necessitated painting the wound on Victor's arm." "Vic was leary about tangling with the critter," Lamarr confided to Hedda Hopper in December 1948. "I told him, 'Don't be afraid. I'm not, and I'm even wearing a red dress.' He replied, 'You've got your animals mixed. This is a lion, not a bull.' When he started closing in on the lion, the cameraman shouted, 'If he jumps, Vic, try and stay in the lights.'" Mature himself later recounted the moment:

I had no love for the lion, and he wasn't carrying any torch for me. In the scene where I was supposed to be stalking him, Cecil DeMille kept urging me to get closer, and I was calling out, "Nice kitty, nice kitty." Didn't do any good. The lion cast an unaffectionate eye upon me, and for a moment it looked like a question of who would jump first—me or the lion. The cameraman, seeing the situation, yelled, "If he jumps, Vic, try to keep yourself properly lighted for the shot." A stunt man finally tackled the lion.

Angela Lansbury later recalled the realism of her character's on-screen death, which consisted of being speared to a wall. "People ask me to this day if it hurt," she said. "With DeMille, everything was that real. I feel sorry for actors who never worked with him. He was an experience. Taught me how to throw a javelin. Twenty-five yards and I can still hit a bull's eye."

In late December 1948, DeMille directed the scene where Samson is blinded by the Philistines. The "red-hot" sword prop had a blade made of opaque plastic with a red neon bulb inside the tip. The tub of coals from which the sword was drawn originally had real coals but DeMille replaced it because the coals did not look real on camera. The new tub contained pieces of colored glass resembling coals with electric lights glowing underneath them. The next scene in the film, the one where Delilah receives her payment, was also filmed in December. Lamarr was ill at the time. She told columnist Sheilah Graham that she had a bad cold "and wouldn't you have, in these clothes—just a tiny bra and skirt?" Lamarr later said, "And, again, in Samson, in the scene where I look dewy-eyed while golden coins are poured over my feet as a reward for betraying Samson. Well, Mr. DeMille, whom I got along with beautifully, dragged me out of a sick bed for that one, and the dewy eyes are a direct result of a roaring 104-degree fever."

In his autobiography, DeMille lauded the acting of Mature and Lamarr in the scene where Delilah discovers Samson's blindness:

For the roles of Samson and Delilah, I selected two players quite deliberately because they embody in a large part of the public mind the essence of maleness and attractive femininity, Victor Mature and Hedy Lamarr. That casting was risky. If it turned out that my two leads had nothing to give to the story but the appearance of male strength and female beauty, however superlatively they shone in those qualities, the real point of the story would be lost. But when I saw the rushes of the scene in the grist mill, of Samson mocked in his agony and Delilah discovering that the man she has loved and betrayed is now blind, I knew, if I had not known before, that the talents of Victor Mature and Hedy Lamarr are more than skin-deep.

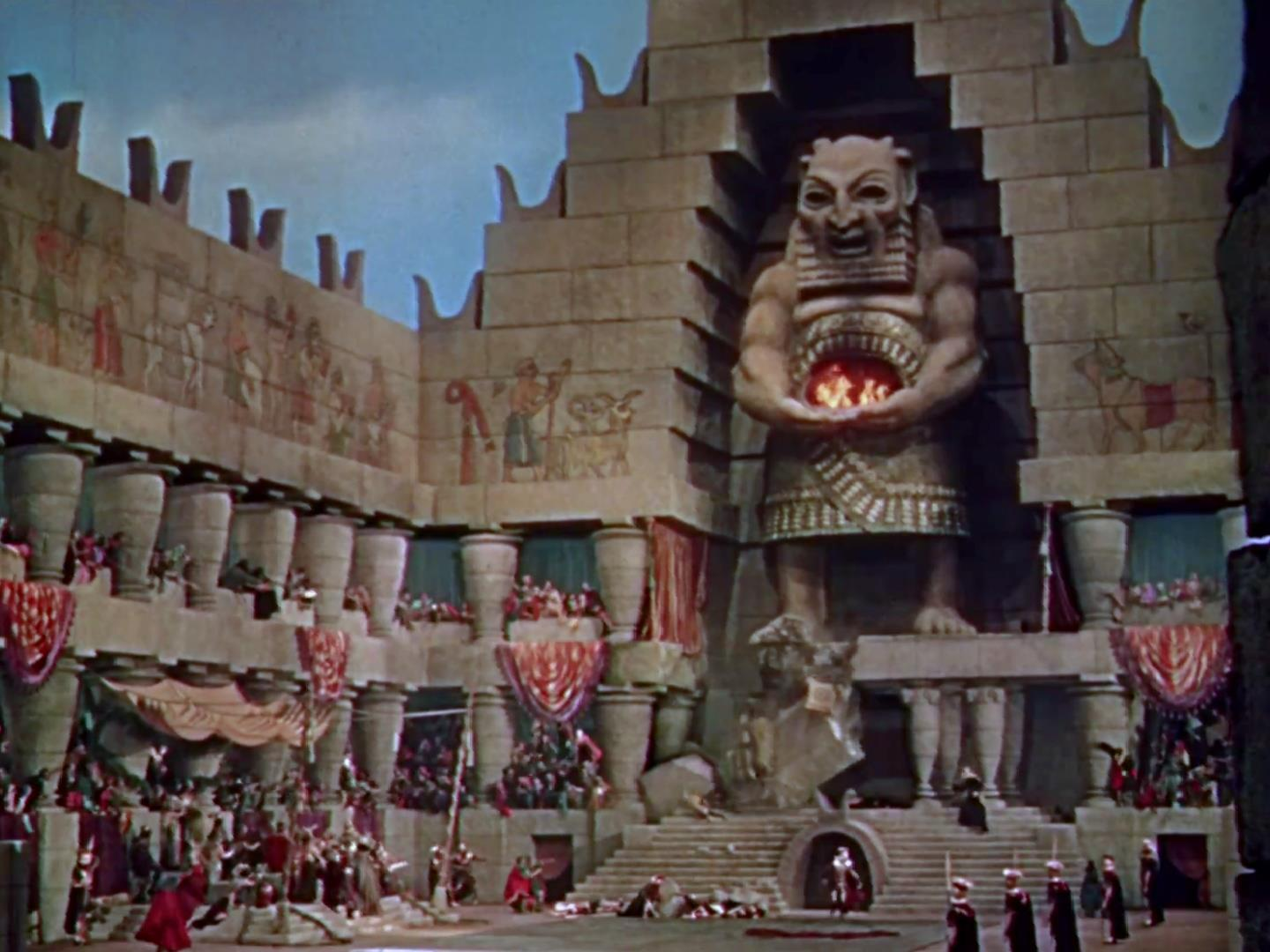
The temple of Dagon.

In a 1971 New York Times article, Lamarr remembered the temple scene: "The set is as gigantically faint-making as anything Mr. DeMille ever conceived, and every single extra within a 50 mile radius seems to be assembled as I slowly lead Samson to the top, where he is scheduled to pull the two enormous pillars of the temple down around his ears and everyone else's. And do you know what I am thinking as I watch this panoply on my television screen? Quite simply, it is 'I can't take another step in those damn forties high heels! . . .'"

The film's special effects were supervised by Gordon Jennings. The most spectacular special effect in the film is the toppling of the temple of Dagon, the god of the Philistines. It is the penultimate scene in the film, cost $150,000, and took a year to shoot. The bottom portion of the temple was constructed full-scale. A separate 37-foot high model with a 17-foot high Dagon statue was built for the photographic effects. The model was destroyed three times to shoot it through different camera angles. Footage of the full-scale set was merged with footage of the scale model using a "motion repeater system" fabricated by Paramount, which enabled the exact repetition of camera moves.

In February 1949, the rough cut of the film ran over three hours. That same month, Erskine Johnson wrote that DeMille had to cut the film from 3 hours and 13 minutes to 142 minutes. By July 1949, the film had been completely edited and was awaiting small touches concerning the music score and dubbing of sound effects. Paramount executives and the audience at a sneak preview called it "DeMille's masterpiece."

=== Connection with Sunset Boulevard ===
DeMille's legendary status led him to play himself in Billy Wilder's film noir Sunset Boulevard (1950). The film is about a fictional silent film star named Norma Desmond (played by Gloria Swanson) who, no longer active, once worked as an actress for DeMille. For the scene in which Desmond visits DeMille at Paramount, an actual set of Samson and Delilah was reconstructed to show the director at work. The first day scheduled to shoot the scene was May 23, 1949, months after filming on Samson and Delilah had ended. After the scene was shot in a total of four days, Wilder patted DeMille on the back and humorously told him, "Very good, my boy. Leave your name with my secretary. I may have a small part for you in my next picture." Wilder later said that DeMille "took direction terrifically. He loved it. He understood it. He was very subtle."

== Release ==
Here—for me—is the climax of thirty-seven years of motion picture making, the dream of a lifetime come true.

— Cecil B. DeMille, an excerpt of a half-page DeMille statement about Samson and Delilah published in New York newspapers in late 1949.

Samson and Delilah received its world premiere on December 21, 1949, at two of New York City's Broadway theatres, the Paramount and the Rivoli, in order to "accommodate the 7,000,000 movie-goers in the greater New York area." DuMont Television Network televised the event. Famous people who attended the event included Mary Pickford, Buddy Rogers, Barney Balaban, Guy Lombardo, Arlene Francis, Lanny Ross, Jessica Dragonette, Will H. Hays, New York Supreme Court Justice Samuel Leibowitz, Risë Stevens, Sidney Blackmer, Ed Sullivan, and Fannie Hurst. The film eventually went into general release on January 13, 1950.

It was successfully re-released in November 1959 following the box office triumph of Joseph E. Levine's Hercules (1958).

=== Critical response ===
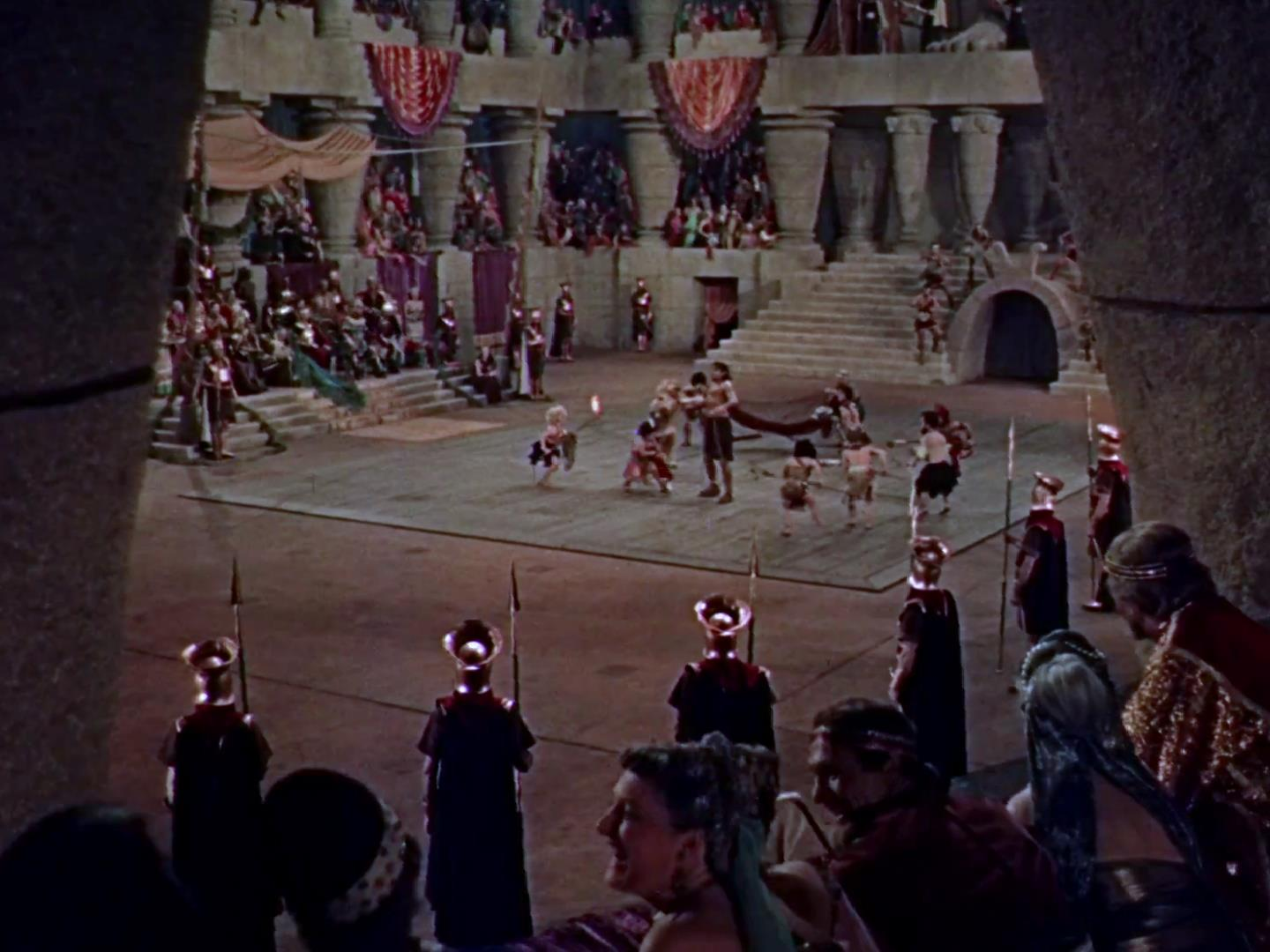
George Barnes's cinematography was nominated for both the Academy Award and the Golden Globe Award.

Samson and Delilah received rave reviews upon its release in 1949. In September, Walter Winchell observed that the film "sent the coast previewers home ecstatic." Showmen's Trade Review wrote that it "bids fair to stand as this veteran showman's most impressive and magnificent spectacle since that history-making 1923 religious epic [The Ten Commandments]." A review in Harrison's Reports commented, "Mr. DeMille has succeeded, not only in keeping the story authentic, but also in presenting it in a highly entertaining way. Its combination of spectacularity and human interest will grip the attention of all movie-goers." Alice Hughes believed that "with decisive clarity, the theme of the struggle between virtue and sin […] stands out" and "is never lost in the maze of men and matter", and she called the lion and temple scenes "the acme of cinema art." Boxoffice considered it the "most prodigious spectacle ever conceived," while The Film Daily stated that it stands "monumental alongside any contender." The trade publication The Exhibitor declared, "This will be classed with the big films of all time." Bosley Crowther of The New York Times admired the "dazzling displays of splendid costumes, of sumptuous settings and softly tinted flesh which Mr. DeMille's color cameras have brilliantly pageanted […] Color has seldom been more lushly or unmistakably used." Hedda Hopper included it in her list of the year's best films: "Cecil B. DeMille's Samson and Delilah, though it won't be released [in California] until next year, was one of the finest pictures made in 1949. It has everything, including the boy-meets-girl theme and the jawbone of an ass. It's lush with Technicolor." The Modern Screen reviewer remarked, "It's tremendous, impressive, and beautiful to look at."

Variety appreciated the film's cast by writing, "Victor Mature fits neatly into the role of the handsome but dumb hulk of muscle that both the Bible and DeMille make of the Samson character. Hedy Lamarr never has been more eye-filling and makes of Delilah a convincing minx. George Sanders gives a pleasantly light flavor of satirical humor to the part of the ruler, while Henry Wilcoxon is duly rugged as the military man."

Film critic Leonard Maltin, in his review for Samson and Delilah, wrote: "With expected DeMille touches, this remains a tremendously entertaining film."

=== Box office ===
Samson and Delilah was enormously successful, earning $9 million in theatrical rentals in its initial release, thus making it the highest-grossing film of 1950. At the time of its release, it was the third highest-grossing film ever, behind Gone with the Wind (1939) and The Best Years of Our Lives (1946). It was the second most popular film at the British box office that year.

During its theatrical reissue, in 1959, it earned another $2.5 million in distributor rentals.

=== Accolades ===
==== Competitive awards ====
Award	Category	Recipient(s)	Result
Academy Award	Best Art Direction (Color)	Art directors: Hans Dreier and Walter H. Tyler; Set decorators: Samuel M. Comer and Ray Moyer	Won
Academy Award	Best Cinematography (Color)	George Barnes	Nominated
Academy Award	Best Costume Design (Color)	Edith Head, Dorothy Jeakins, Elois Jenssen, Gile Steele, and Gwen Wakeling	Won
Academy Award	Best Music Score of a Dramatic or Comedy Picture	Victor Young	Nominated
Academy Award	Best Special Effects	Cecil B. DeMille Productions	Nominated
American Society of Cinematographers Award	Best Picture of the Month (February 1950)	George Barnes	Won (tied with Joseph Ruttenberg for That Forsyte Woman)
Christian Herald and Protestant Motion Picture Council Award	Best Picture of the Month (December 1949)	Cecil B. DeMille	Won
Film français Grand Prix	Best Foreign Film of 1951	Cecil B. DeMille	Won
Golden Globe Award	Best Cinematography	George Barnes	Nominated
Photoplay Award	Best Pictures of the Month (February 1950)	The Hasty Heart, Intruder in the Dust, and Samson and Delilah	Won
Picturegoer Gold Medal	Best Actress	Hedy Lamarr	10th place

==== Special awards ====
In December 1949, DeMille was awarded the Parents' magazine medal for "thirty-five years of devotion to research in the production of historical pictures culminating in his greatest achievement, Samson and Delilah."

In March 1950, Samson and Delilah was named one of the Best Pictures of 1949 at Look's Annual Film Awards. DeMille received the All Industry Achievement Award for the film.

In December 1950, DeMille received the Boxoffice Barometer Trophy as the producer of Samson and Delilah, the "highest-grossing picture of the year."

==== Polls ====
- 4th Best Picture of 1951, ninth annual poll of The Country Gentleman magazine

The film is recognized by American Film Institute in these lists:

- 2002: AFI's 100 Years...100 Passions – Nominated
- 2005: AFI's 100 Years of Film Scores – Nominated
- 2008: AFI's 10 Top 10 – Nominated Epic Film

== Home media ==
In 1979, Paramount Home Video released the film on VHS and Betamax as a two-tape set. The VHS was released again in 1981 as a single-tape release, and then again in 1988 and 1990.

MCA DiscoVision was originally set to release the film on LaserDisc as part of a set of titles from Paramount Pictures in 1978, but their version was scrapped for unknown reasons. The first LaserDisc edition of Samson and Delilah was finally released in 1982. Ten years later, Paramount released a new LaserDisc edition that featured digital video transferred from a new 35mm interpositive of the original 3-strip Technicolor negatives. DiscoVision's transfer, however, was used in the 1979 VHS and 1980s home media releases.

In 2012, a digital restoration of Samson and Delilah was completed. The original three-strip Technicolor camera negatives were scanned at 4K on a Northlight scanner and then registered, cleaned, and color corrected in 4K by Technicolor Los Angeles. The original music overture was restored and the film's original audio track was cleaned. The restored version received its premiere at Cineteca Bologna's Il Cinema Ritrovato 2012. Paramount Home Media Distribution released the film on DVD (with English, French, and Spanish audio and subtitles) on March 12, 2013. The film was released on Blu-ray Disc (with the original theatrical trailer) on March 11, 2014.

== See also ==
- List of epic films

== Bibliography ==
- Barton, Ruth (2010). Hedy Lamarr: The Most Beautiful Woman in Film. University Press of Kentucky. ISBN 9780813126104.
- Birchard, Robert S. (2009). Cecil B. DeMille's Hollywood. University Press of Kentucky. ISBN 9780813138299.
- DeMille, Cecil B. (1959). The Autobiography of Cecil B. DeMille. Prentice Hall. LCCN 59-15367.
- Eyman, Scott (2010). Empire of Dreams: The Epic Life of Cecil B. DeMille. Simon & Schuster. ISBN 9781439180419.
- Head, Edith; Ardmore, Jane Kesner (1959). The Dress Doctor. Little, Brown and Company. LCCN 59-5935.
- Head, Edith; Calistro, Paddy (1983). Edith Head's Hollywood. E. P. Dutton. ISBN 0-525-24200-7.
- Koury, Phil (1959). Yes, Mr. DeMille. G. P. Putnam's Sons. LCCN 59-12004.
- Lasky, Jesse L., Jr. (1975). Whatever Happened to Hollywood?. Funk & Wagnalls. ISBN 0-308-10172-3.
- McClelland, Doug (1992). Forties Film Talk: Oral Histories of Hollywood, with 120 Lobby Posters. McFarland & Company. ISBN 9780899506722.
- McKay, James (2013). The Films of Victor Mature. McFarland & Company. ISBN 9780786449705.
- Shearer, Stephen Michael (2010). Beautiful: The Life of Hedy Lamarr. Macmillan Publishers. ISBN 978-1429908207.
- Solomon, Jon (2001). The Ancient World in the Cinema. New Haven and London: Yale University Press. ISBN 0-300-08337-8.
- Wilcoxon, Henry; Orrison, Katherine (1991). Lionheart in Hollywood: The Autobiography of Henry Wilcoxon. Metuchen, NJ and London: The Scarecrow Press, Inc. ISBN 978-0-8108-2476-8.
