= Gustave Doré's illustrations for La Grande Bible de Tours =

Wood engraving illustrations for an 1866 version of the Bible

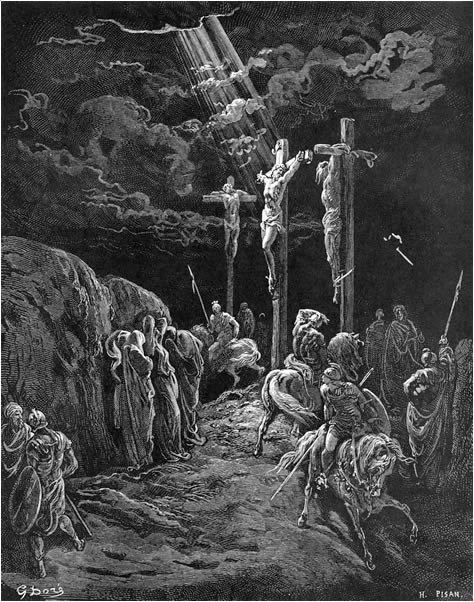
"The Crucifixion", an engraving from Doré's illustrations for La Grande Bible de Tours (1866). It depicts the situation described in Luke 23.

The illustrations for La Grande Bible de Tours are a series of 241 wood engravings, designed by the French artist, printmaker, and illustrator Gustave Doré (1832–1883) for a new deluxe edition of the 1843 French translation of the Vulgate Bible, popularly known as the Bible de Tours.

La Grande Bible de Tours, issued in 1866, was a large folio ("grand in folio") edition published in two volumes simultaneously by Mame in Tours, France and by Cassell & Company in the United Kingdom. The French translation known as the Bible de Tours had originally been published in 1843 and was done by Jean Jacques Bourassé (1813–1872) and Pierre Désiré Janvier (1817–1888).

The illustrations were immensely successful and have been reproduced countless times worldwide, influencing the visual arts and popular culture in ways difficult to measure. The series comprises 139 plates depicting scenes from the Old Testament, including the deuterocanonical books, and 81 from the New Testament.

== Background ==
Doré's artistic reasons for undertaking the Bible project are outlined by his biographer, Joanna Richardson:

It offered him an almost endless series of intensely dramatic events. His visions of the looming tower of Babel, the plague of darkness in Egypt, the death of Samson, Isaiah's vision of the destruction of Babylon; these vast, forbidding scenes, heavy with doom, remind one of the visions of John Martin. They also reveal many elements by now familiar in Doré's work: the mountain scenes, the lurid skies, the complicated battles, the almost unremitting brutalism. Doré's illustrations of the Old Testament remind us, above all, of the God of Wrath: of massacres and murders, decapitations and avenging angels. There is, too, a period element: the angels are Victorian angels, full of sentiment; the women are, again, keepsake women, the children are Victorian children: sentimental or wise beyond their years.

== The illustrations ==
=== The Old Testament ===
	Scene	Image	Book/chapter/verse depicted
1	"The Creation of Light"		Genesis 1:3
2	"The Formation of Eve" (or "The Creation of Eve")		Genesis 2:21-22
3	"Adam and Eve Driven Out of Eden"		Genesis 3:24
4	"Cain and Abel Offering Their Sacrifices"		Genesis 4:3-5
5	"The Death of Abel" (or "Cain Slays Abel")		Genesis 4:8-9
6	"The World Destroyed by Water"		Genesis 7:24
7	"The Deluge" (or "The Great Flood")		Genesis 8:3-4
8	"The Dove Sent Forth from the Ark"		Genesis 8:11
9	"Noah Cursing Canaan" (or "Noah Curses Ham and Canaan")		Genesis 9:24-25
10	"The Confusion of Tongues"		Genesis 11:6-8
11	"Abraham Journeying into the Land of Canaan"		Genesis 12:1
12	"Abraham and the Three Angels"		Genesis 18:9-10
13	"The Flight of Lot"		Genesis 19:24-26
14	"The Expulsion of Ishmael and His Mother"		Genesis 21:14
15	"Hagar and Ishmael in the Wilderness"		Genesis 21:17-18
16	"The Trial of Abraham's Faith"		Genesis 22:10-12
17	"The Burial of Sarah"		Genesis 23:19
18	"Eliezer and Rebekah"		Genesis 24:16
19	"The Meeting of Isaac and Rebekah"		Genesis 24:65-67
20	"Isaac Blessing Jacob"		Genesis 27:29
21	"Jacob's Dream"		Genesis 28:12
22	"Jacob Keeping Laban's Flocks" (or "Jacob Tends Laban's Flocks and Meets Rachel")		Genesis 29:1-20
23	"The Prayer of Jacob" (or "Jacob Prays for Protection")		Genesis 32:11
24	"Jacob Wrestling with the Angel"		Genesis 32:24
25	"The Meeting of Jacob and Esau"		Genesis 33:3-4
26	"Joseph Sold by His Brethren"		Genesis 37:28
27	"Joseph Interpreting the Pharaoh's Dream"		Genesis 41:25-26
28	"Joseph Makes Himself Known to His Brethren" (or "Joseph Reveals Himself to His Brothers")		Genesis 45:1
29	"Jacob Goeth Into Egypt"		Genesis 46:5
30	"The Child Moses on the Nile"		Exodus 2:3
31	"The Finding of Moses"		Exodus 2:6
32	"Moses and Aaron Before Pharaoh"		Exodus 7:10
33	"The Murrain of Beasts" (or "The Fifth Plague: Livestock Disease")		Exodus 9:2-3
34	"The Plague of Darkness" (or "The Ninth Plague: Darkness")		Exodus 10:22
35	"The Firstborn Slain"		Exodus 12:29-30
36	"The Egyptians Urge Moses to Depart"		Exodus 12:31
37	"The Egyptians Drowned in the Red Sea"		Exodus 14:27
38	"Moses Striking the Rock in Horeb"		Exodus 17:6
39	"The Giving of the Law Upon Mt. Sinai"		Exodus 19:18
40	"Moses Coming Down From Mt. Sinai"		Exodus 32:15
41	"Moses Breaking the Tablets of the Law"		Exodus 32:19
42	"Return of the Spies from the Land of Promise"		Numbers 13:27
43	"Death of Korah, Dathan, and Abiram"		Numbers 16:32
44	"The Brazen Serpent" (or "The Bronze Serpent")		Numbers 21:9
45	"The Angel Appearing to Balaam"		Numbers 22:23
46	"The Children of Israel Crossing Jordan"		Joshua 3:17
47	"The Angel Appearing to Joshua"		Joshua 5:9-15
48	"The Walls of Jericho Falling Down"		Joshua 6:20
49	"Joshua Spares Rahab"		Joshua 6:25
50	"The Stoning of Achan"		Joshua 7:25
51	"Joshua Committing the Town of Ai to the Flames"		Joshua 8:20
52	"Destruction of the Army of the Amorites"		Joshua 10:11
53	"Joshua Commanding the Sun to Stand Still"		Joshua 10:13
54	"Jael and Sisera"		Judges 4:21
55	"Deborah"		Judges 5:7-9
56	"Gideon Choosing His Soldiers"		Judges 7:7
57	"The Midianites Put to Flight"		Judges 7:22-23
58	"Death of the Sons of Gideon"		Judges 9:5
59	"Death of Abimelech"		Judges 9:52-53
60	"Jephthah's Daughter Coming to Meet Her Father"		Judges 11:34
61	"The Daughters of Israel Lamenting the Daughter of Jephthah"		Judges 11:40
62	"Samson Slaying a Lion"		Judges 14:5-6
63	"Samson Destroying the Philistines With the Jawbone of an Ass"		Judges 15:15
64	"Samson Carrying Away the Gates of Gaza"		Judges 16:3
65	"Samson and Delilah"		Judges 16:17
66	"Death of Samson"		Judges 16:30
67	"The Levite Finding the Corpse of the Woman"		Judges 19:25-27
68	"The Levite Bearing Away the Body of the Woman"		Judges 19:30
69	"The Children of Benjamin Carrying Off the Virgins of Jabesh-Gilead"		Judges 21:12
70	"Naomi and Her Daughters-In-Law"		Ruth 1:16
71	"Boaz and Ruth"		Ruth 2:22-23
72	"Return of the Ark to Bethshemesh"		1 Samuel 6:13
73	"Samuel Blessing Saul"		1 Samuel 9:21
74	"Death of Agag"		1 Samuel 15:33
75	"David and Goliath"		1 Samuel 17:50
76	"Saul Attempts the Life of David"		1 Samuel 18:11-12
77	"The Escape of David Through the Window"		1 Samuel 19:11-12
78	"David and Jonathan"		1 Samuel 20:42
79	"David Showing Saul that He had Spared His Life"		1 Samuel 24:10
80	"Saul and the Witch of Endor"		1 Samuel 28:7
81	"Death of Saul"		1 Samuel 31:5-6
82	"Combat Between the Champions of Ish-Bosheth and David"		2 Samuel 2:15-17
83	"David Punishing the Ammonites"		2 Samuel 12:31
84	"Death of Absalom"		2 Samuel 18:9
85	"David Mourning the Death of Absalom"		2 Samuel 18:33
86	"Rizpah's Kindness Unto the Dead"		2 Samuel 21:9-10
87	"Abishai Saves the Life of David"		2 Samuel 21:17
88	"Judgment of Solomon"		1 Kings 3:25-27
89	"Cutting Down Cedars for the Construction of the Temple"		1 Kings 5:5-6
90	"The Disobedient Prophet Slain by a Lion"		1 Kings 13:24-25
91	"Elijah Raiseth the Son of the Widow of Zarephath"		1 Kings 17:22-23
92	"Slaughter of the Prophets of Baal"		1 Kings 18:38-40
93	"Elijah Nourished by an Angel"		1 Kings 19:5-6
94	"Slaughter of the Syrians by the Children of Israel"		1 Kings 20:29
95	"Death of Ahab"		1 Kings 22:35
96	"Elijah Destroys the Messengers of Ahaziah by Fire"		2 Kings 1:10
97	"Elijah Taken Up To Heaven in a Chariot of Fire"		2 Kings 2:11
98	"The Children Destroyed by Bears"		2 Kings 2:23-24
99	"The Famine in Samaria"		2 Kings 6:25-26
100	"The Death of Jezebel"		2 Kings 9:33
101	"Jehu's Companions Finding the Remains of Jezebel"		2 Kings 9:34-35
102	"The Strange Nations Slain by the Lions of Samaria"		2 Kings 17:25
103	"Destruction of the Army of Sennacherib"		2 Kings 19:35
104	"Slaughter of the Sons of Zedekiah Before Their Father"		2 Kings 25:7
105	"The Inhabitants of Jabesh-Gilead Recovering the Bodies of Saul and His Sons"		1 Chronicles 10:12
106	"Plague of Jerusalem"		1 Chronicles 21:16
107	"Solomon"		2 Chronicles 1:10
108	"Solomon Receiving the Queen of Sheba"		2 Chronicles 9:1-2
109	"The Destruction of the Armies of the Ammonites and Moabites"		2 Chronicles 20:22-23
110	"Death of Athaliah"		2 Chronicles 23:13-15
111	"Cyrus Restoring the Vessels of the Temple"		Ezra 1:7-8
112	"The Rebuilding of the Temple"		Ezra 3:11
113	"Artaxerxes Granting Liberty to the Jews"		Ezra 7:13
114	"Ezra in Prayer"		Ezra 9:6
115	"Nehemiah Viewing Secretly the Ruins of the Walls of Jerusalem"		Nehemiah 2:13
116	"Ezra Reading the Law in the Hearing of the People"		Nehemiah 8:5-6
117	"The Queen Vashti Refusing to Obey the Command of Ahasuerus"		Esther 1:11-12
118	"Triumph of Mordecai"		Esther 6:11
119	"Esther Accusing Haman"		Esther 7:5-6
120	"Job Hearing of His Ruin"		Job 1:20-22
121	"Job and His Friends"		Job 2:11-13
122	"Isaiah"		Isaiah 6:8-9
123	"Isaiah's Vision of the Destruction of Babylon"		Isaiah 13:20-21
124	"The Destruction of Leviathan"		Isaiah 27:1
125	"Jeremiah"		Jeremiah 1:14-15
126	"Baruch Writing Jeremiah's Prophecies"		Jeremiah 36:4
127	"The People Mourning Over the Ruins of Jerusalem"		Lamentations 1:8
128	"Ezekiel Prophesying"		Ezekiel 1:3
129	"The Vision of the Valley of the Dry Bones"		Ezekiel 37:4-5
130	"Daniel"		Daniel 2:20-21
131	"Shadrach, Meshach, and Abednego in the Fiery Furnace"		Daniel 3:28/3:95
132	"Daniel Interpreting the Writing on the Wall"		Daniel 5:5-6
133	"Daniel in the Den of Lions"		Daniel 6:20-21/6:21-22
134	"The Vision of the Four Beasts"		Daniel 7:2-3
135	"Amos"		Amos 1:1
136	"Jonah Cast Forth by the Whale"		Jonah 2:1,10/2:2, 11
137	"Jonah Preaching to the Ninevites"		Jonah 3:4-5
138	"Micah Exhorting the Israelites to Repentance"		Micah 6:7-8
139	"The Vision of the Four Chariots"		Zechariah 6:1

=== The Deuterocanon ===
	Scene	Image	Book/chapter/verse depicted
140	"Tobias and the Angel"		Tobit 6:4
141	"The Angel Raphael and the Family of Tobit"		Tobit 12:15, 20
142	"Judith and Holofernes"		Judith 13:8
143	"Judith Shows the Head of Holofernes"		Judith 13:14
144	"Esther Before the King"		Esther 15:6-7
145	"Mattathias and the Apostate"		I Maccabees 2:23-24
146	"Mattathias Appeals to the Jewish Refugees"		I Maccabees 2:50
147	"Judas Maccabeus Pursues Timotheus"		I Maccabees 5:42
148	"The Death of Eleazar"		I Maccabees 6:43, 46
149	"Jonathan Destroys the Temple of Dagon"		I Maccabees 10:84
150	"Heliodorus Is Cast Down"		II Maccabees 3:25-27
151	"The Army Appears in the Heavens"		II Maccabees 5:2
152	"The Martyrdom of Eleazar the Scribe"		II Maccabees 6:30
153	"The Courage of a Mother"		II Maccabees 7:29
154	"The Punishment of Antiochus"	The Punishment of Antiochus	II Maccabees 9:7, 9
155	"The Angel Is Sent to Deliver Israel"	The Angel Is Sent to Deliver Israel	II Maccabees 11:8
156	"Judas Maccabeus before the Army of Nicanor"		II Maccabees 15:21
157	"Baruch"		Baruch 3:14
158	"Susanna in the Bath"		The History of Susanna 21 (i.e., 13:1-26 of the "Extended Book of Daniel")
159	"The Justification of Susanna"		The History of Susanna 61-62 (i.e., 13:36-64 of the "Extended Book of Daniel")
160	"Daniel Confounds the Priests of Bel"		Bel and the Dragon (i.e., 14:1-27 of the "Extended Book of Daniel")

=== The New Testament ===
	Scene	Image	Book/chapter/verse depicted
161	"The Wise Men Guided by the Star"		Matthew 2:1-2
162	"The Flight Into Egypt"		Matthew 2:13-14
163	"The Massacre of the Innocents"		Matthew 2:16
164	"The Sermon on the Mount"		Matthew 5:7-10
165	"The Dumb Man Possessed"		Matthew 12:22-25
166	"Christ in the Synagogue"		Matthew 13:54
167	"The Daughter of Herod Receiving the Head of John the Baptist"		Matthew 14:8-10
168	"Christ Feeding the Multitude"		Matthew 14:19
169	"Jesus Healing the Sick"		Matthew 15:31
170	"The Transfiguration"		Matthew 17:2-3
171	"Jesus Healing the Lunatic"		Matthew 17:14-15
172	"Entry of Jesus Into Jerusalem"		Matthew 21:7-8
173	"Christ and the Tribute Money"		Matthew 22:20-21
174	"Jesus Praying in the Garden"		Matthew 26:40-41
175	"Jesus Scourged"		Matthew 27:26
176	"Christ Mocked"		Matthew 27:29-30
177	"The Arrival at Calvary"		Matthew 27:33-34
178	"The Erection of the Cross"		Matthew 27:35
179	"The Descent From the Cross"		Matthew 27:57-58
180	"The Dead Christ"		Matthew 27:59
181	"The Burial of Christ"		Matthew 27:60-61
182	"The Resurrection"		Matthew 28:5-6
183	"John the Baptist Preaching in the Wilderness"		Mark 1:6-7
184	"The Baptism of Jesus"		Mark 1:9-11
185	"The Disciples Plucking Corn on the Sabbath"		Mark 2:23-25
186	"Jesus Stilling the Tempest"		Mark 4:37-38
187	"Jesus Blessing the Little Children"		Mark 10:13-14
188	"The Widow's Mite"		Mark 12:42-43
189	"The Last Supper"		Mark 14:22-24
190	"The Judas Kiss"		Mark 14:45-46
191	"Jesus Falling Beneath the Cross"		Mark 15:21
192	"The Ascension"		Mark 16:19
193	"The Annunciation"		Luke 1:26-28
194	"The Nativity"		Luke 2:15-16
195	"Jesus With the Doctors"		Luke 2:46-47
196	"The Temptation of Jesus"		Luke 4:7-8
197	"Jesus Healing the Man Possessed With a Devil"		Luke 4:36-37
198	"Jesus Preaching at the Sea of Galilee"		Luke 5:3
199	"Mary Magdalene Repentant"		Luke 8:2
200	"Jesus Raising Up the Daughter of Jairus"		Luke 8:52-54
201	"The Good Samaritan"		Luke 10:33
202	"Arrival of the Good Samaritan at the Inn"		Luke 10:34-35
203	"Jesus at the House of Martha and Mary"		Luke 10:41-42
204	"Jesus Preaching to the Multitude"		Luke 12:29-31
205	"The Return of the Prodigal Son"		Luke 15:17
206	"The Prodigal Son in the Arms of His Father"		Luke 15:20-21
207	"Lazarus at the Rich Man's House"		Luke 16:20-21
208	"The Pharisee and the Publican"		Luke 18:11-13
209	"The Agony in the Garden"		Luke 22:43-44
210	"The Crucifixion"		Luke 23:34-35
211	"The Darkness at the Crucifixion"		Luke 23:44-45
212	"Jesus and the Disciples Going to Emmaus"		Luke 24:26-27
213	"The Marriage in Cana"		John 2:5-7
214	"The Buyers and Sellers Driven Out of the Temple"		John 2:15
215	"Jesus and the Woman of Samaria"		John 4:13-14
216	"Jesus Walking on the Sea"		John 6:19-20
217	"Jesus and the Woman Taken in Adultery"		John 8:3-5
218	"Resurrection of Lazarus"		John 11:41-43
219	"St. Peter Denying Christ"		John 18:26-27
220	"The Crown of Thorns"		John 19:2-3
221	"Christ Presented to the People"		John 19:15
222	"Nailing Christ to the Cross"		John 19:18-19
223	"The Miraculous Draught of Fishes"		John 21:10-11
224	"The Descent of the Spirit"		Acts 2:2-3
225	"The Apostles Preaching the Gospel"		Acts 2:32-33
226	"St. Peter and St. John at the Beautiful Gate"		Acts 3:6-7
227	"Death of Ananias"		Acts 5:4-5
228	"Martydom of St. Stephen"		Acts 7:59-60
229	"Conversion of Saul"		Acts 9:3-5
230	"St. Peter the House of Cornelius"		Acts 10:28
231	"St. Peter Delivered From Prison"		Acts 12:7-8
232	"St. Paul at Ephesus"		Acts 19:19
233	"St. Paul Rescued From the Multitude"		Acts 21:34-35
234	"St. Paul Shipwrecked"		Acts 27:43-44
235	"St. Paul Preaching to the Thessalonians"		1 Thessalonians 2:11-12
236	"St. John at Patmos"		Revelation 1:9
237	"The Vision of Death"		Revelation 6:7-8
238	"The Crowned Virgin: A Vision of John"		Revelation 12:1-3
239	"Babylon Fallen"		Revelation 18:2
240	"The Last Judgment"		Revelation 20:12
241	"The New Jerusalem"		Revelation 21:1-2
