= Friedrich Glasl's model of conflict escalation =

Model that assists in the analysis of conflicts

Friedrich Glasl's model of conflict escalation assists in the analysis of conflicts. Appropriate reactions can be derived from this analysis. The model has nine stages – in contrast to the earlier model of Kurt R. Spillmann, which describes five distinct stages of escalation. These stages are grouped into three levels, which each contain three stages.

== Levels ==
Glasl represents "escalation in his nine stage model not as an ascent to higher and higher stages of escalation, but as a descent to deeper and deeper, more primitive and more inhuman forms of dispute... [which] inevitably leads into regions that evoke great 'inhuman energies' which are not ultimately amenable to human control or restraint." In the first level both parties can still win (win–win). In the second level one of the parties loses and the other wins (win–lose), and in the third level both parties lose (lose–lose).

The nine stages of conflict escalation

Many different kinds of conflict can be thus analysed: divorces, conflicts between colleagues and school children, and also conflicts between states.

=== 1st Level (Win–Win) ===
Stage 1 – Tension
Conflicts start with tensions, e.g. the occasional clash of opinions. This is a common occurrence and is not perceived as the start of a conflict. However, if a conflict should result in the positions becoming more fundamental, then the conflict could have deeper causes.
Stage 2 – Debate
From now on the conflict parties consider strategies to convince the counterparty of their arguments. Differences of opinion lead to a dispute. The parties try to put each other under pressure and think in terms of black and white.
Stage 3 – Actions instead of words
The conflict parties increase the pressure on each other in order to assert their own opinion. Discussions are broken off. No more verbal communication takes place and the conflict is increasingly exacerbated. Sympathy for "them" disappears.

=== 2nd Level (Win–Lose) ===
Stage 4 – Coalitions
The conflict is exacerbated by the search for sympathisers for one's cause. Believing one has right on one's side, one can denounce the opponent. The issue is no longer important: one has to win the conflict so that the opponent loses.
Stage 5 – Loss of face
The opponent is to be denigrated by innuendo and the like. The loss of trust is complete. Loss of face means in this sense the loss of moral credibility.
Stage 6 – Threat strategies
The conflict parties try to gain absolute control by issuing threats which demonstrate their own power. One threatens, for example, with a demand (10 million euros) which is enforced by a sanction ("otherwise I′ll blow up your main building") and underlined by the potential for sanction (showing the explosive). The proportions decide the credibility of the threat.

=== 3rd Level (Lose–Lose) ===
Stage 7 – Limited destruction
One tries to severely damage the opponent with all the tricks at one's disposal. The opponent is no longer regarded as human. From now on, limited personal loss is seen as a gain if the damage to the opponent is greater.
Stage 8 – Total annihilation
The opponent is to be annihilated by all means.
Stage 9 – Together into the abyss
From this point personal annihilation is accepted in order to defeat the opponent.

=== Together into the abyss: Samson analogy for the final stage ===
Samson's death in verse 16:30 of The Book of Judges in the Hebrew Bible is example of Glasl's final stage. Samson's dying words in Judges 16:30 are 'Let me die with the Philistines'. The expression means that after seeing that a person will not be able to defeat his enemy, he decides to take revenge on the enemy and cause both himself and his enemy to be harmed. According to Friedrich Glasl's conflict escalation model, this is the final stage in the escalation of a conflict in which a person is willing to lose everything, the main thing being to defeat his opponent. In situations where death or severe injury is already difficult to avoid, it is seen by some as heroic to abandon efforts to save one's self and instead focus on causing as much harm as possible to the enemy, in the process of effectively committing suicide. Samson's dying words have become a common expression in Hebrew, Arabic, and related varieties of English.

In Arabic the Phrasing is slightly different, but the meaning is similar. In Arabic the expression is phrased differently, as roughly “Against me and my enemies, O Lord!” (Arabic: عليّ وعلى أعدائي يا رب). The phrase is a proverb in Arabic, about an attacker's desire to harm his enemy even at the cost of the attacker causing his own death. For example, the expression been used in The New Arab newspaper to describe Russian's nuclear strategy.

Menachem Begin described the concept at length in a propaganda statement praising two Zionist militants who were killed in a suicide operation in a British-run prison in Palestine, one of his own Irgun fighters and another from the Lehi militant group.

— Menachem Begin, as Irgun commander, April 1947.
Rough translation in English	Begin's statement in Hebrew
"…and their decision was to renew the ancient tradition of the ancient Hebrew warrior, Samson: Let my soul die with the Philistines! Indeed, if there is no more retreat, if death closes in on you from all sides, Samson's way is good: Even the enemy will descend with me into the abyss! And the two young heroes would have exploded along with the British executioners…"	…והחלטתם היתה לחדש את המסורת העתיקה של הלוחם העברי הקדמון, שמשון: תמות נפשי עם פלשתים! אכן, אם אין עוד נסיגה, אם המוות סוגר עליך מכל עבר, טובה היא הדרך של שמשון: גם האויב ירד יחד אתי תהומה! ושני הגבורים הצעירים היו מתפוצצים יחד עם התליינים הבריטיים אלמלא ידיעתם מראש…

The Lehi had planned to turn the allegedly scheduled double execution – of their own militant and a member of Begin's Irgun – into a suicide attack, using concealed explosives to kill the militants as well as their executioners and other high ranking British security personnel. Begin, who approved the original plan, claimed that it was thwarted by a Rabbi – who allegedly did not know the plan – refusing to stay a safe distance away from the gallows at the time of the hanging. The explosives detonated while the two militants were alone in their cell, killing only them. This was still seen as a heroic victory for avoiding the hanging the British had planned.

== Strategies for de-escalation and conflict solution ==
The model describes how two parties in a conflict behave. Solutions leading to de-escalation are not immediately apparent in this model, particularly when it appears to both conflict parties impossible to reverse the situation (e.g. an aggressive act on the territory of a state, separation of a common child from the other parent, withdrawal of nationality by a state, mass redundancy to improve shareholder value), or when one party selects conflict escalation as a strategic ploy.

To achieve de-escalation Glasl assigns the following strategic models to the different stages of escalation:

- Stage 1–3: mediation
- Stage 3–5: process guidance
- Stage 4–6: sociotherapeutic process guidance
- Stage 5–7: intercession, intermediation
- Stage 6–8: arbitration, court action
- Stage 7–9: forcible intervention

The ability to recognise and eliminate conflict-nourishing forces in a culturally neutral and non-judgemental fashion in order to de-escalate a conflict is highly advantageous in particular for managers, consultants and social workers.

== Criticism ==
Glasl’s conflict model is criticized for being too deterministic and ignoring the probabilistic nature of conflict dynamics.

== See also ==
- Business ethics
- Charles E. Osgood § GRIT
- Conflict escalation
- Conflict management
- De-escalation
- Delphinstrategie (in German)
- Dialogue
- Getting to Yes
- Judges 16:30 (Biblical example of final stage)
- Just war theory
- Karpman drama triangle
- Mediation
- Nonviolent Communication
- Paul Graham's hierarchy of disagreement
- Rise up and kill him first

Book: Rise and Kill First

- Samson option
- The War of the Roses (film)

== Bibliography ==
- Friedrich Glasl: Konfliktmanagement. Ein Handbuch für Führungskräfte, Beraterinnen und Berater. Haupt, Bern 9. A. 2009, ISBN 978-3-258-07556-3.
- Alexander Redlich: Konfliktmoderation in Gruppen (mit Lehrfilm auf DVD). Windmühle, Hamburg 7. A. 2009, ISBN 978-3-937444-18-5
- Some translations from: Ruth Mischnick: "Nonviolent Conflict Transformation – Training Manual for a Training of Trainers Course" (the link, https://web.archive.org/web/20160304082001/http://library.deeep.org/record/777/files/DEEEP-BOOK-2014-473.pdf, now links to the web archive as primary link is no longer available as at 2020-07-14).
