= Judges 13 =

Book of Judges, chapter 13

- ← chapter 12 chapter 14 →
- The pages containing the Book of Judges in Leningrad Codex (1008 CE).
- Book: Book of Judges
- Hebrew Bible part: Nevi'im
- Order in the Hebrew part: 2
- Category: Former Prophets
- Christian Bible part: Old Testament (Heptateuch)
- Order in the Christian part: 7

Judges 13 is the thirteenth chapter of the Book of Judges in the Old Testament or the Hebrew Bible. According to Jewish tradition the book was attributed to the prophet Samuel, but modern scholars view it as part of the Deuteronomistic History, which spans in the books of Deuteronomy to 2 Kings, attributed to nationalistic and devotedly Yahwistic writers during the time of the reformer Judean king Josiah in 7th century BCE. This chapter records the activities of the judge Samson, belonging to a section comprising Judges 13 to 16 and Judges 6:1 to 16:31.

== Text ==
This chapter was originally written in the Hebrew language. It is divided into 25 verses.

=== Textual witnesses ===
Some early manuscripts containing the text of this chapter in Hebrew are of the Masoretic Text tradition, which includes the Codex Cairensis (895), Aleppo Codex (10th century), and Codex Leningradensis (1008).

Extant ancient manuscripts of a translation into Koine Greek known as the Septuagint (originally was made in the last few centuries BCE) include Codex Vaticanus (B; $\mathfrak{G}$^{B}; 4th century) and Codex Alexandrinus (A; $\mathfrak{G}$^{A}; 5th century). (Note: The whole book of Judges is missing from the extant Codex Sinaiticus.)

== Analysis ==
A linguistic study by Chisholm reveals that the central part in the Book of Judges (Judges 3:7–16:31) can be divided into two panels based on the six refrains that state that the Israelites did evil in Yahweh's eyes:

Panel One

A 3:7 ויעשו בני ישראל את הרע בעיני יהוה

And the children of Israel did evil in the sight of the LORD (KJV)
B 3:12 ויספו בני ישראל לעשות הרע בעיני יהוה

And the children of Israel did evil again in the sight of the LORD

B 4:1 ויספו בני ישראל לעשות הרע בעיני יהוה

And the children of Israel did evil again in the sight of the LORD

Panel Two

A 6:1 ויעשו בני ישראל הרע בעיני יהוה

And the children of Israel did evil in the sight of the LORD
B 10:6 ויספו בני ישראל לעשות הרע בעיני יהוה

And the children of Israel did evil again in the sight of the LORD

B 13:1 ויספו בני ישראל לעשות הרע בעיני יהוה

And the children of Israel did evil again in the sight of the LORD

Furthermore from the linguistic evidence, the verbs used to describe the Lord's response to Israel's sin have chiastic patterns and can be grouped to fit the division above:

Panel One

3:8 וימכרם, "and he sold them," from the root מָכַר, makar
3:12 ויחזק, "and he strengthened," from the root חָזַק, khazaq
4:2 וימכרם, "and he sold them," from the root מָכַר, makar

Panel Two

6:1 ויתנם, "and he gave them," from the root נָתַן, nathan
10:7 וימכרם, "and he sold them," from the root מָכַר, makar
13:1 ויתנם, "and he gave them," from the root נָתַן, nathan

Chapters 13–16 contains the "Samson Narrative" or "Samson Cycle", a highly structured poetic composition with an 'almost architectonic tightness' from a literary point-of-view. The entire section consists of 3 cantos and 10 subcantos and 30 canticles, as follows:

- Canto I : the birth story of Samson (Judges 13:2–25)
- Canto II : the feats of Samson in Timnah and Judah (Judges 14:1–16:3)
- Canto III : Samson's exploits in the Valley of Sorek and the temple of Dagon (Judges 16:4–31).

The distribution of the 10 subcantos into 3 cantos is a regular 2 + 4 + 4, with the number of canticles per subcanto as follows:

- Canto I: 3 + 3
- Canto II: 3 + 3 + 3 + 5 (3 + 2?)
- Canto III: 2 + 2 + 3 + 3

The number of strophes per canticle in each canto is quite uniform with numerical patterns in Canto II showing a 'concentric symmetry':

- Canto I: 4 + 4 + 4 | 4 + 4 + 4
- Canto Ila: 4 + 3 + 3 | 4 + 4 + 4 | 3 + 3 + 4 (concentric)
- Canto IIb: 4 + 4 + 3 + 4? + 4 (concentric)
- Canto III: 4 + 4 | 4 + 4 | 4 + 4 + 4 | 3 + 3 + 4

The structure regularity within the whole section classifies this composition as a 'narrative poetry' or 'poetic narrative'.

== Israel oppressed by the Philistines (13:1) ==
And the children of Israel did evil again in the sight of the Lord; and the Lord delivered them into the hand of the Philistines forty years.

The oppression of the Israelites by the Philistines was briefly mentioned in Judges 10:7, is stated here again with the standing formula: "And the children of Israel did evil again in the sight of the Lord" (cf. Judges 10:6; Judges 4:1; Judges 3:12).

- "Forty years": as Samson judged Israel for 20 years during the 40-year oppression (Judges 15:20; Judges 16:31), he must have started his judgeship at around the age of 20 right after the incident of his marriage with a Philistine woman (Judges 14). The end of the 40 years of the Philistine oppression was the decisive victory under the command of Samuel (1 Samuel 7), twenty years after the Philistines had sent back the Ark of the Covenant, which they had taken from the Israelites for seven months in their own territory (1 Samuel 6:1, 1 Samuel 7:2). Therefore, the twenty years of Samson as a judge of Israel took place in this time frame, shortly following the death of Eli (1 Samuel 4:18), until just before the final victory in Eben-Ezer (1 Samuel 7:12–13)

== Birth of Samson (13:2–25) ==
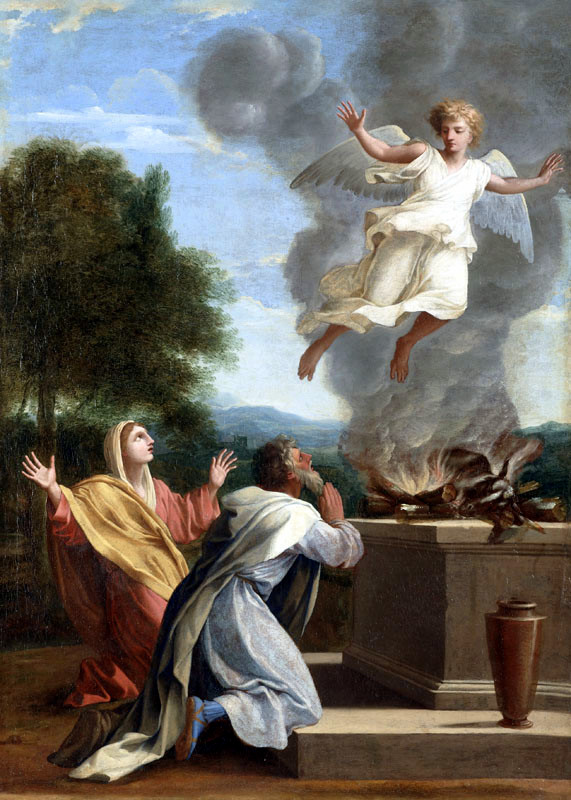
Manoah and his barren wife sacrifice a ram to the angel of the Lord (above), in Eustache Le Sueur's The Sacrifice of Manoah, 1640–1650.

The birth narrative of Samson follows the pattern of heroes' birth in the Israelite tradition, starting with as a barren mother (cf. Sarah, Rebekah, Rachel, and Hannah) receiving an annunciation (verse 3), a special theophany usually with women as the 'primary recipients' (cf. Mary in Luke 1), accompanied by specific instructions for the mother and son (verses 4-6) causing an expression of fear or awe (verse 22; cf. Rebekah in Genesis 25:22–23; Hagar in Genesis 16:11–12; Sarah and Abraham in Genesis 18). Samson's nazirite identity (verses 4–6; 7; 14) is in accordance to the description in the Priestly text of Numbers 6:1–21, but among the nazirite characteristics, the specific motif of hair is especially central to the Samson Narrative. Samson's mother was unnamed, although she was the one receiving the important message about the birth and especially about the hair (verse 5), and appears to be calmer (and more readily believe the message) than her named husband (Manoah) who was fearful and unsure (cf. verses 8, 12, 16, and 21 with 6–7, 10, 23). As a confirmation of her importance in the narrative, she is the one who names the boy, Samson ("man of the sun"; in Hebrew: simson, whereas semes means "sun"), following the tradition of naming the child in the Hebrew Bible (cf. Hannah in 1 Samuel 1:20; Eve in Genesis 4:1, and the matriarchs, Leah and Rachel).

The narrative in verses 3–24 has a structure that almost parallels with Judges 16 in terms of text arrangement:

The woman is barren (13:2)

1) an inclusion

1. A. messenger appears (Hebrew: wyr) to the woman (13:3–5)
2. B. the woman tells her husband (13:6–8)
3. C. he prays that the messenger come again (13:9)
4. A'. the messenger comes again to the woman (13:9)
5. B'. she tells the man has appeared (Hebrew: nr'h) (13:10)

2) fourfold asking and answer discourse (13:11–18)

1. First question and answer (13:11)
2. Second question and answer (13:12–14)
3. A request and reply (13:15–16)
4. Fourth question and answer (13:17–18)

3) an inclusion

1. Manoah takes (Hebrew: wyqh) a kind and cereal offering (13:19)
2. messenger does not appear again (13:20–21)
3. Manoah knew he was messenger of YHWH (13:21–22)
4. YHWH would not have taken (Hebrew: lqh) the burnt offering (13:23)

The woman bears a son (13:24)

=== Verse 25 ===
And the Spirit of the Lord began to move upon him at Mahaneh Dan between Zorah and Eshtaol.

- "Mahaneh Dan": literally, "Camp of Dan" (cf. Judges 18:12).

== See also ==
- Angel of the Lord
- Children of Israel
- Eshtaol
- Korban
- Manoah
- Nazirite
- Philistines
- Spirit of the Lord
- Tribe of Dan
- Zorah
- Related Bible parts: Judges 14, Judges 15, Judges 16, Hebrews 11

== Sources ==
- Chisholm, Robert B. Jr. (2009). "The Chronology of the Book of Judges: A Linguistic Clue to Solving a Pesky Problem" (PDF). Journal of the Evangelical Theological Society. 52 (2): 247–55. Archived from the original (PDF) on 2022-11-08.
- Coogan, Michael David (2007). Coogan, Michael David; Brettler, Marc Zvi; Newsom, Carol Ann; Perkins, Pheme (eds.). The New Oxford Annotated Bible with the Apocryphal/Deuterocanonical Books: New Revised Standard Version, Issue 48 (Augmented 3rd ed.). Oxford University Press. ISBN 978-0-19-528881-0.
- Halley, Henry H. (1965). Halley's Bible Handbook: an abbreviated Bible commentary (24th (revised) ed.). Zondervan Publishing House. ISBN 0-310-25720-4.
- Hayes, Christine (2015). Introduction to the Bible. Yale University Press. ISBN 978-0-300-18827-1.
- Kim, Jichan (1993). The Structure of the Samson Cycle. Kok Pharos Publishing House. ISBN 978-90-390-0016-8.
- Niditch, Susan (2007). "10. Judges". In Barton, John; Muddiman, John (eds.). The Oxford Bible Commentary (first (paperback) ed.). Oxford University Press. pp. 176–191. ISBN 978-0-19-927718-6.
- Webb, Barry G. (2012). The Book of Judges. New International Commentary on the Old Testament. Eerdmans Publishing Company. ISBN 978-0-8028-2628-2.
- Würthwein, Ernst (1995). The Text of the Old Testament. Translated by Rhodes, Erroll F. Grand Rapids, MI: Wm. B. Eerdmans. ISBN 0-8028-0788-7.
- Younger, K. Lawson (2002). Judges and Ruth. The NIV Application Commentary. Zondervan. ISBN 978-0-310-20636-1.
