= Judges 16 =

Book of Judges, chapter 16

- ← chapter 15 chapter 17 →
- The pages containing the Book of Judges in Leningrad Codex (1008 CE).
- Book: Book of Judges
- Hebrew Bible part: Nevi'im
- Order in the Hebrew part: 2
- Category: Former Prophets
- Christian Bible part: Old Testament (Heptateuch)
- Order in the Christian part: 7

Judges 16 is the sixteenth chapter of the Book of Judges in the Old Testament or the Hebrew Bible. According to Jewish tradition the book was attributed to the prophet Samuel, but modern scholars view it as part of the Deuteronomistic History, which spans in the books of Deuteronomy to 2 Kings, attributed to nationalistic and devotedly Yahwistic writers during the time of the reformer Judean king Josiah in 7th century BCE. This chapter records the activities of judge Samson. belonging to a section comprising Judges 13 to 16 and Judges 6:1 to 16:31.

== Text ==
This chapter was originally written in the Hebrew language. It is divided into 31 verses.

=== Textual witnesses ===
Some early manuscripts containing the text of this chapter in Hebrew are of the Masoretic Text tradition, which includes the Codex Cairensis (895), Aleppo Codex (10th century), and Codex Leningradensis (1008).

Extant ancient manuscripts of a translation into Koine Greek known as the Septuagint (originally was made in the last few centuries BCE) include Codex Vaticanus (B; $\mathfrak{G}$^{B}; 4th century) and Codex Alexandrinus (A; $\mathfrak{G}$^{A}; 5th century). (Note: The whole book of Judges is missing from the extant Codex Sinaiticus.)

== Analysis ==
=== The Two Panels ===
A linguistic study by Chisholm reveals that the central part in the Book of Judges (Judges 3:7–16:31) can be divided into two panels based on the six refrains that state that the Israelites did evil in Yahweh's eyes:

Panel One

A 3:7 ויעשו בני ישראל את הרע בעיני יהוה

And the children of Israel did evil in the sight of the LORD (KJV)
B 3:12 ויספו בני ישראל לעשות הרע בעיני יהוה

And the children of Israel did evil again in the sight of the LORD

B 4:1 ויספו בני ישראל לעשות הרע בעיני יהוה

And the children of Israel did evil again in the sight of the LORD

Panel Two

A 6:1 ויעשו בני ישראל הרע בעיני יהוה

And the children of Israel did evil in the sight of the LORD
B 10:6 ויספו בני ישראל לעשות הרע בעיני יהוה

And the children of Israel did evil again in the sight of the LORD

B 13:1 ויספו בני ישראל לעשות הרע בעיני יהוה

And the children of Israel did evil again in the sight of the LORD

From the linguistic evidence, the verbs used to describe the Lord's response to Israel's sin have chiastic patterns and can be grouped to fit the division above:

Panel One

3:8 וימכרם, "and he sold them," from the root מָכַר, makar
3:12 ויחזק, "and he strengthened," from the root חָזַק, khazaq
4:2 וימכרם, "and he sold them," from the root מָכַר, makar

Panel Two

6:1 ויתנם, "and he gave them," from the root נָתַן, nathan
10:7 וימכרם, "and he sold them," from the root מָכַר, makar
13:1 ויתנם, "and he gave them," from the root נָתַן, nathan

=== The Samson Narrative ===
Chapters 13–16 contains the "Samson Narrative" or "Samson Cycle", a highly structured poetic composition with an 'almost architectonic tightness' from a literary point-of-view. The entire section consists of 3 cantos and 10 subcantos and 30 canticles, as follows:

- Canto I : the birth story of Samson (Judges 13:2–25)
- Canto II : the feats of Samson in Timnah and Judah (Judges 14:1–16:3)
- Canto III : Samson's exploits in the Valley of Sorek and the temple of Dagon (Judges 16:4–31).

The distribution of the 10 subcantos into 3 cantos is a regular 2 + 4 + 4, with the number of canticles per subcanto as follows:

- Canto I: 3 + 3
- Canto II: 3 + 3 + 3 + 5 (3 + 2?)
- Canto III: 2 + 2 + 3 + 3

The number of strophes per canticle in each canto is quite uniform with numerical patterns in Canto II showing a 'concentric symmetry':

- Canto I: 4 + 4 + 4 | 4 + 4 + 4
- Canto Ila: 4 + 3 + 3 | 4 + 4 + 4 | 3 + 3 + 4 (concentric)
- Canto IIb: 4 + 4 + 3 + 4? + 4 (concentric)
- Canto III: 4 + 4 | 4 + 4 | 4 + 4 + 4 | 3 + 3 + 4

The structure regularity within the whole section classifies this composition as a 'narrative poetry' or 'poetic narrative'.

Besides the thematic symmetry, parts of the narrative shows an observable structure with chapter 13 balances chapter 16 (each consisting of three sub-sections with a fourfold asking and answer discourse at the center) whereas chapters 14 and 15 show a parallelism in form and content.

=== Structure of Chapter 16 ===
The narrative in chapter 16 has a structure that almost parallels with Judges 13 in terms of text arrangement:

1) encounter with the harlot of Gaza (16:1–3)
2) fourfold asking and answer discourse 16:4–22)

1. First question and answer (16:4–9)
2. Second question and answer (16:10–12)
3. Fourth question and answer(16:13–14)
4. Upbraiding and reply (16:15–22)

3) an inclusion

1. Lords of Philistines and people are present (16:23–24)
2. They "call" Samson; a lad supports (Hebrew: hmhzyq) him (16:25–26)
3. Great numbers are present(16:27)
4. Samson "call" on YHWH; YHWH strengthens (Hebrew: whzqny) him (16:28)
5. Lords of Philistines and people are killed (16:30)

== Samson's encounter with the harlot of Gaza (16:1–3) ==
This brief section foreshadows the longer narrative involving Delilah and follows the earlier patterns. Samson was again attracted to a Philistine woman, a prostitute (or "harlot"), in Gaza and the encounter ended in his superheroic departure, by lifting off the gates of the city at night (verse 3), whereas the enemy planned to capture him the next morning (verse 2). This episode provides a clue to the false sense of Samson's invincibility, which would soon turn to his downfall, especially as the appeal of Philistine women was seen as Samson's tragic flaw; emphasizing the 'danger of foreign (and loose) women' (Deuteronomy 7:3–4; Proverbs 5:3–6; 7:10–23). Samson's escape from Gaza turned out to be temporary because he would later be brought there again in bronze fetter (verse 21) and had his final confrontation with the Philistines.

=== Verse 3 ===
And Samson lay low till midnight; then he arose at midnight, took hold of the doors of the gate of the city and the two gateposts, pulled them up, bar and all, put them on his shoulders, and carried them to the top of the hill that faces Hebron.

- "The doors… two gateposts… bar and all": This is a detailed description of a typical Canaan city gates in that period.
- "The hill that faces Hebron": The distance from Gaza in the coastal plain of the Mediterranean Sea to Hebron in the central hill area of Judah, 927 meters above sea level, is about 39 miles (63 km), uphill all the way. The unnamed hill must have been the closest ridge to the west of Hebron. Hebron was the leading city of Judah at that time, so bringing his "war trophy" there is a way of Samson to show the people of Judah that he would always fight the Philistines alone in his own way.

== Samson and Delilah (16:4–22) ==
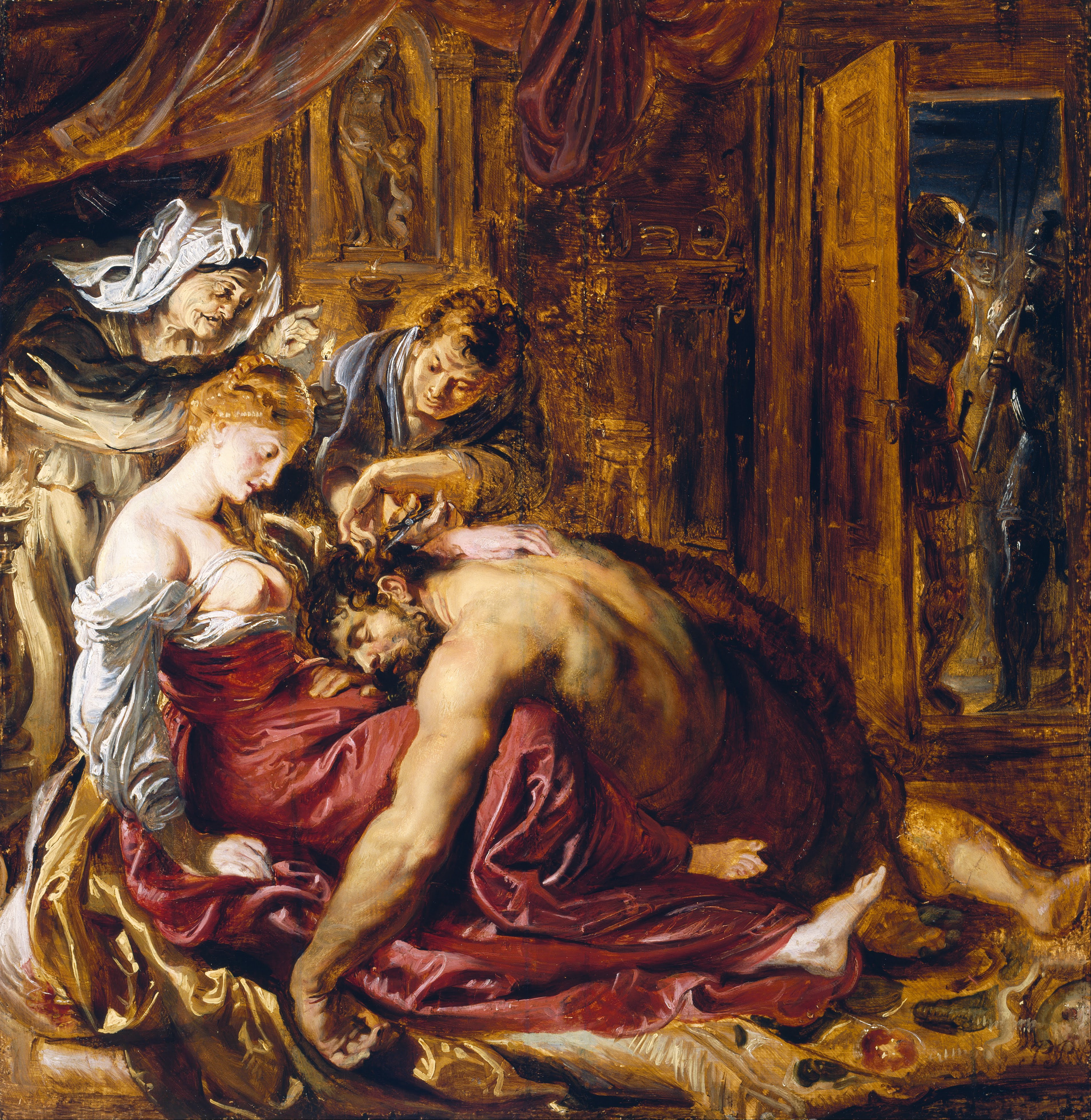
Samson and Delilah, a sketch by Peter Paul Rubens' (c. 1609)

The story of Samson's downfall follows the familiar pattern in the cycle:

- encounter with a Philistine woman;
- attempted entrapment or trickery
- counter-trickery or escape.

Samson was finally caught by his enemies, when he was with the third foreign woman, Delilah (Hebrew: דְּלִילָֽה, də·lî·lāh), whose name could mean 'loose hair' or 'flirtatiousness', but also a word play on the term for "night" (Hebrew: לַ֫יְלָה lay-lāh) whereas Samson's name derives from the term for "sun" (Hebrew: šemeš). Significantly, Delilah is the only named woman in the Samson Narrative (cf. Samson's mother as "Manoah's wife", Samson's Timnite wife, the harlot in Gaza). The Philistine lords ('tyrants') offered Delilah a reward in silver if she was able to discover and divulge to them the secret of Samson's strength, following the folktales that some heroes' strength resides in an amulet or special item. The source of Samson's power in this narrative is related to his status as a 'nazir', declared even before his birth, so here the traditional folk motif intertwines with particular theological topic of Samson's relationship to YHWH. Thus, Samson's mistake was his false belief that his strength is not contingent upon the symbol of his consecration to YHWH, so when shorn of his hair, Samson did not realize that YHWH had left him and that he had become vulnerable like normal men, so he could be caught and bound by his enemies. Powerless in fetters and with his eyes gouged out, Samson was placed in the prison in Gaza and made to grind at a mill, usually the work of women: so the mighty hero had been feminized, as Sisera to Jael (Judges 4, 5).

== Death of Samson (16:23–31) ==
Samson's rehabilitation and his final victory took place during a Philistine festival to honor their god, Dagon, when the Philistines had Samson brought out for humiliation. Feigning weakness, Samson asked the lad who led him to be allowed to lean on the pillars of the great house that was filled with 3,000 Philistines. With a final prayer to God, Samson pushed the pillars, thereby broke down the roof of the house, killing himself and his enemies. The narrative ends with an admiration for Samson's final deed (verse 30) and a note of his honorable burial (verse 31).

=== Verse 30 ===
Samson's death is in verse 16:30 and his dying words are 'Let me die with the Philistines' (Hebrew: תמות נפשי עם פלשתים with niqqud Hebrew: תָּמוֹת נַפְשִׁי עִם-פְּלִשְׁתִּים). It is also sometimes translated as 'Let my Soul Die with the Philistines'.

Samson's dying words have become a common expression in Hebrew, Arabic, and related varieties of English. The expression means that after seeing that a person will not be able to defeat his enemy, he decides to take revenge on the enemy and cause both himself and his enemy to be harmed. According to Friedrich Glasl's model of conflict escalation this is the final stage in the escalation of a conflict in which a person is willing to lose everything, the main thing being to defeat his opponent.

Hebrew: …המסורת העתיקה של הלוחם העברי הקדמון, שמשון: תמות נפשי עם פלשתים! אכן, אם אין עוד נסיגה, אם המוות סוגר עליך מכל עבר, טובה היא הדרך של שמשון: גם האויב ירד יחד אתי תהומה!	Translation: ...the ancient Hebrew warrior, Samson: Let my soul die with the Philistines! Indeed, if there is no more retreat, if death closes in on you from all sides, Samson's way is good: Even the enemy will descend with me into the abyss!
— Menachem Begin, as Irgun commander), in April 1947.

In Arabic the phrasing of the commonly used expression is slightly different, but the meaning is similar. In Arabic the expression is phrased differently, as roughly “Against me and my enemies, O Lord!” (Arabic: عليّ وعلى أعدائي يا رب). The phrase is a proverb in Arabic, about an attacker's desire to harm his enemy even at the cost of the attacker causing his own death. This expression has been used in The New Arab newspaper to describe Russian nuclear strategy. It is also used to describe other situations in war and politics.

=== Verse 31 ===
And his brothers and all his father's household came down and took him, and brought him up and buried him between Zorah and Eshtaol in the tomb of his father Manoah. He had judged Israel twenty years.

"Between Zorah and Eshtaol": This epilogue indicates that Samson's burial place was the same place where the Spirit first moved him (Judges 13:25) and thereby completes the theme of reconciliation with 'his brothers and all his father's household'.

== See also ==
- Concepts
  - Die with the Philistines
  - Christian views on suicide
  - Self-sacrifice in Jewish law
  - The first suicide attack
- People
  - Hebrew Bible judges
  - King Saul § Death
  - Nazirite
  - Philistines
  - Samson § Death
- Locations
  - City gate
  - Gaza City
  - Nahal Sorek (Valley of Sorek)
  - Temple of Dagon
- The Book of Judges
  - Judges 13
  - Judges 14
  - Judges 15
- Related Bible parts
  - Daniel 5
  - Hebrews 11

== Sources ==
- Chisholm, Robert B. Jr. (2009). "The Chronology of the Book of Judges: A Linguistic Clue to Solving a Pesky Problem" (PDF). Journal of the Evangelical Theological Society. 52 (2): 247–55. Archived from the original (PDF) on 2022-11-08.
- Coogan, Michael David (2007). Coogan, Michael David; Brettler, Marc Zvi; Newsom, Carol Ann; Perkins, Pheme (eds.). The New Oxford Annotated Bible with the Apocryphal/Deuterocanonical Books: New Revised Standard Version, Issue 48 (Augmented 3rd ed.). Oxford University Press. ISBN 978-0-19-528881-0.
- Halley, Henry H. (1965). Halley's Bible Handbook: an abbreviated Bible commentary (24th (revised) ed.). Zondervan Publishing House. ISBN 0-310-25720-4.
- Hayes, Christine (2015). Introduction to the Bible. Yale University Press. ISBN 978-0-300-18827-1.
- Kim, Jichan (1993). The Structure of the Samson Cycle. Kok Pharos Publishing House. ISBN 978-90-390-0016-8.
- Niditch, Susan (2007). "10. Judges". In Barton, John; Muddiman, John (eds.). The Oxford Bible Commentary (first (paperback) ed.). Oxford University Press. pp. 176–191. ISBN 978-0-19-927718-6.
- Webb, Barry G. (2012). The Book of Judges. New International Commentary on the Old Testament. Eerdmans Publishing Company. ISBN 978-0-8028-2628-2.
- Würthwein, Ernst (1995). The Text of the Old Testament. Translated by Rhodes, Erroll F. Grand Rapids, MI: Wm. B. Eerdmans. ISBN 0-8028-0788-7.
- Younger, K. Lawson (2002). Judges and Ruth. The NIV Application Commentary. Zondervan. ISBN 978-0-310-20636-1.
