= Judges 15 =

Book of Judges, chapter 15

- ← chapter 14 chapter 16 →
- The pages containing the Book of Judges in Leningrad Codex (1008 CE)
- Book: Book of Judges
- Hebrew Bible part: Nevi'im
- Order in the Hebrew part: 2
- Category: Former Prophets
- Christian Bible part: Old Testament (Heptateuch)
- Order in the Christian part: 7

Judges 15 is the fifteenth chapter of the Book of Judges in the Old Testament or the Hebrew Bible. According to Jewish tradition the book was attributed to the prophet Samuel, but modern scholars view it as part of the Deuteronomistic History, which spans in the books of Deuteronomy to 2 Kings, attributed to nationalistic and devotedly Yahwistic writers during the time of the reformer Judean king Josiah in 7th century BCE. This chapter records the activities of judges Samson. belonging to a section comprising Judges 13 to 16 and Judges 6:1 to 16:31.

== Text ==
This chapter was originally written in the Hebrew language. It is divided into 20 verses.

=== Textual witnesses ===
Some early manuscripts containing the text of this chapter in Hebrew are of the Masoretic Text tradition, which includes the Codex Cairensis (895), Aleppo Codex (10th century), and Codex Leningradensis (1008).

Extant ancient manuscripts of a translation into Koine Greek known as the Septuagint (originally was made in the last few centuries BCE) include Codex Vaticanus (B; $\mathfrak{G}$^{B}; 4th century) and Codex Alexandrinus (A; $\mathfrak{G}$^{A}; 5th century). (Note: The whole book of Judges is missing from the extant Codex Sinaiticus.)

== Analysis ==
A linguistic study by Chisholm reveals that the central part in the Book of Judges (Judges 3:7–16:31) can be divided into two panels based on the six refrains that state that the Israelites did evil in Yahweh's eyes:

Panel One

A 3:7 ויעשו בני ישראל את הרע בעיני יהוה

And the children of Israel did evil in the sight of the LORD (KJV)
B 3:12 ויספו בני ישראל לעשות הרע בעיני יהוה

And the children of Israel did evil again in the sight of the LORD

B 4:1 ויספו בני ישראל לעשות הרע בעיני יהוה

And the children of Israel did evil again in the sight of the LORD

Panel Two

A 6:1 ויעשו בני ישראל הרע בעיני יהוה

And the children of Israel did evil in the sight of the LORD
B 10:6 ויספו בני ישראל לעשות הרע בעיני יהוה

And the children of Israel did evil again in the sight of the LORD

B 13:1 ויספו בני ישראל לעשות הרע בעיני יהוה

And the children of Israel did evil again in the sight of the LORD

Furthermore from the linguistic evidence, the verbs used to describe the Lord's response to Israel's sin have chiastic patterns and can be grouped to fit the division above:

Panel One

3:8 וימכרם, "and he sold them," from the root מָכַר, makar
3:12 ויחזק, "and he strengthened," from the root חָזַק, khazaq
4:2 וימכרם, "and he sold them," from the root מָכַר, makar

Panel Two

6:1 ויתנם, "and he gave them," from the root נָתַן, nathan
10:7 וימכרם, "and he sold them," from the root מָכַר, makar
13:1 ויתנם, "and he gave them," from the root נָתַן, nathan

Chapters 13–16 contains the "Samson Narrative" or "Samson Cycle", a highly structured poetic composition with an 'almost architectonic tightness' from a literary point-of-view. The entire section consists of 3 cantos and 10 subcantos and 30 canticles, as follows:

- Canto I : the birth story of Samson (Judges 13:2–25)
- Canto II : the feats of Samson in Timnah and Judah (Judges 14:1–16:3)
- Canto III : Samson's exploits in the Valley of Sorek and the temple of Dagon (Judges 16:4–31).

The distribution of the 10 subcantos into 3 cantos is a regular 2 + 4 + 4, with the number of canticles per subcanto as follows:

- Canto I: 3 + 3
- Canto II: 3 + 3 + 3 + 5 (3 + 2?)
- Canto III: 2 + 2 + 3 + 3

The number of strophes per canticle in each canto is quite uniform with numerical patterns in Canto II showing a 'concentric symmetry':

- Canto I: 4 + 4 + 4 | 4 + 4 + 4
- Canto Ila: 4 + 3 + 3 | 4 + 4 + 4 | 3 + 3 + 4 (concentric)
- Canto IIb: 4 + 4 + 3 + 4? + 4 (concentric)
- Canto III: 4 + 4 | 4 + 4 | 4 + 4 + 4 | 3 + 3 + 4

The structure regularity within the whole section classifies this composition as a 'narrative poetry' or 'poetic narrative'.

Besides the thematic symmetry, parts of the narrative shows an observable structure with chapter 13 balances chapter 16 (each consisting of three sub-sections with a fourfold asking and answer discourse at the center) whereas chapters 14 and 15 show a parallelism in form and content.

Chapter 15:1–19 has the following structure:

A. After a while ... Samson visited (15:1–3)

1. speech between Samson and father-in-law.
2. parental objection
3. Samson's rejection of the possibility of another woman.

B. Samson went (15:4–6a)

1. action involving animals (foxes).

C. The Philistines came up (15:6b–8)

1. action involving retaliation, a vicious act

D. The Philistines came up (15:9–19)

1. speech between Judahites, Philistines and Samson;
2. Philistines threaten third party to beat Samson
3. Spirit of YHWH and Samson's victory.

== Samson's revenge (15:1–8) ==
Samson's desire for his woman coincides with the harvest season, a time of fertility (cf. Ruth 2)., and he brought a peace offering as if all is forgiven, displaying 'his obliviousness to social convention'. The woman's father offered Samson another deal, the younger sister (cf. Saul to David, 1 Samuel 17:25; 18:17–22), but this was declined and followed by Samson's superheroic vengeance, attaching torches to the tails of 300 foxes to set fire among the standing grain, vineyards, and olive groves of the Philistines. The Philistines retaliated by setting the whole family of Samson's wife-to-be on fire. Samson had an outburst that he killed many Philistines as vengeance, then withdrew to a cave in Etam(verse 8).

=== Verse 8 ===
And he struck them hip and thigh with a great blow, and he went down and stayed in the cleft of the rock of Etam.

- "Hip and thigh": from Hebrew: "soq al-yarek", probably an idiom for "total victory".
- "Rock of Etam": presumed to be a place down in a valley or creek with caves to hide. Etam is mentioned as village (hasher) in the territory of Simeon (1 Chronicles 4:32), which was within Judah (Joshua 19:1–9), later fortified by Jeroboam and listed between Bethlehem and Tekoa (2 Chronicles 11:6).

== Samson defeats the Philistines (15:9–20) ==
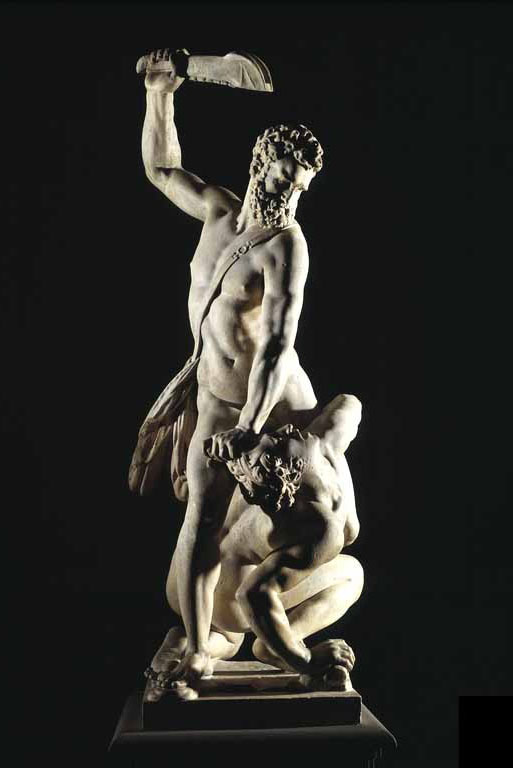
Samson Slaying a Philistine, a marble sculpture by Giambologna c. 1562

Israelites are elsewhere portrayed as tending to collaborate with the enemy than to revolt (cf. Exodus 2:14; 5:21), thus the men of Judah would rather to hand over Samson to the Philistines to avoid an attack (cf. 2 Samuel 20:14–22). As many as 3,000 men of Judah came to Samson to bind him as instructed by the Philistines, but starting with an accusation of wrongdoing ('What is this that you have done to us?') to convince Samson to allow himself to be given over peacefully to the enemy. Samson went with the Philistines until Lehi before he had an outburst with a 'power fuelled by the divine frenzy', breaking the ropes that bind him with an imagery of 'fire' (verse 14), then using the jawbone of a donkey (another animal motif) to kill a thousand Philistine men.

The basic elements of this fight recalls a similar pattern in Samson's fight with the lion in the vineyards of Timnah as follows:

| Judges 14:5–6 | Judges 15:14–19 |
|---|---|
| A lion comes "roaring" to meet Samson | The Philistines come "shouting" to meet Samson |
| The Spirit of YHWH rushes upon Samson | The Spirit of YHWH rushes upon Samson |
| Samson "tears" the lion in two | Samson "strikes down" the Philistines |

Thereafter Samson used a proverb to declare his victory in a 'war-taunt' with word play of the root h-m-r (could mean 'donkey' or 'pile up', in parallel to the many slain Philistines as'heaps and heaps'). The record of the amazing victory over the Philistines concludes with Samson's plea to God to quench his thirst, characteristically with a hyperbole if 'God intends to reward the hero of Israel with death by thirst' (verse 18). God responded by splitting open a spring from a rocky hollow (cf. Elijah and Moses) so that Samson could drink and be revived. Verse 20 marks the end of the first part of Samson epic, to be followed by the story of Samson's fall in the next chapter.

=== Verse 20 ===
And he judged Israel in the days of the Philistines twenty years.

- "In the days of the Philistines": serves as a reminder of Samson's limitation, that his acts as a judge started and ended within the period of the Philistine occupation, so Samson did not fully deliver Israel from the oppression of the Philistines. The final victory against the Philistines would be achieved under the leadership of Samuel in Eben-Ezer (1 Samuel 7:12–13), "twenty years" after the return of the Ark of the Covenant by the Philistines.

== See also ==
- Ascalon
- Enhakkore
- Men of Judah
- Philistines
- Ramathlehi
- Rock of Etam
- Spirit of the Lord
- Timnite
- Related Bible parts: Judges 13, Judges 14, Judges 16, Hebrews 11

== Sources ==
- Chisholm, Robert B. Jr. (2009). "The Chronology of the Book of Judges: A Linguistic Clue to Solving a Pesky Problem" (PDF). Journal of the Evangelical Theological Society. 52 (2): 247–55. Archived from the original (PDF) on 2022-11-08.
- Coogan, Michael David (2007). Coogan, Michael David; Brettler, Marc Zvi; Newsom, Carol Ann; Perkins, Pheme (eds.). The New Oxford Annotated Bible with the Apocryphal/Deuterocanonical Books: New Revised Standard Version, Issue 48 (Augmented 3rd ed.). Oxford University Press. ISBN 978-0-19-528881-0.
- Halley, Henry H. (1965). Halley's Bible Handbook: an abbreviated Bible commentary (24th (revised) ed.). Zondervan Publishing House. ISBN 0-310-25720-4.
- Hayes, Christine (2015). Introduction to the Bible. Yale University Press. ISBN 978-0-300-18827-1.
- Kim, Jichan (1993). The Structure of the Samson Cycle. Kok Pharos Publishing House. ISBN 978-90-390-0016-8.
- Niditch, Susan (2007). "10. Judges". In Barton, John; Muddiman, John (eds.). The Oxford Bible Commentary (first (paperback) ed.). Oxford University Press. pp. 176–191. ISBN 978-0-19-927718-6.
- Webb, Barry G. (2012). The Book of Judges. New International Commentary on the Old Testament. Eerdmans Publishing Company. ISBN 978-0-8028-2628-2.
- Würthwein, Ernst (1995). The Text of the Old Testament. Translated by Rhodes, Erroll F. Grand Rapids, MI: Wm. B. Eerdmans. ISBN 0-8028-0788-7.
- Younger, K. Lawson (2002). Judges and Ruth. The NIV Application Commentary. Zondervan. ISBN 978-0-310-20636-1.
