= Judges 14 =

Book of Judges, chapter 14

- ← chapter 13 chapter 15 →
- The pages containing the Book of Judges in Leningrad Codex (1008 CE).
- Book: Book of Judges
- Hebrew Bible part: Nevi'im
- Order in the Hebrew part: 2
- Category: Former Prophets
- Christian Bible part: Old Testament (Heptateuch)
- Order in the Christian part: 7

Judges 14 is the fourteenth chapter of the Book of Judges in the Old Testament or the Hebrew Bible. According to Jewish tradition the book was attributed to the prophet Samuel, but modern scholars view it as part of the Deuteronomistic History, which spans in the books of Deuteronomy to 2 Kings, attributed to nationalistic and devotedly Yahwistic writers during the time of the reformer Judean king Josiah in 7th century BCE. This chapter records the activities of judges Samson. belonging to a section comprising Judges 13 to 16 and Judges 6:1 to 16:31.

== Text ==
This chapter was originally written in the Hebrew language. It is divided into 20 verses.

=== Textual witnesses ===
Some early manuscripts containing the text of this chapter in Hebrew are of the Masoretic Text tradition, which includes the Codex Cairensis (895), Aleppo Codex (10th century), and Codex Leningradensis (1008).

Extant ancient manuscripts of a translation into Koine Greek known as the Septuagint (originally was made in the last few centuries BCE) include Codex Vaticanus (B; $\mathfrak{G}$^{B}; 4th century) and Codex Alexandrinus (A; $\mathfrak{G}$^{A}; 5th century). (Note: The whole book of Judges is missing from the extant Codex Sinaiticus.)

== Analysis ==
=== Two panels ===
A linguistic study by Chisholm reveals that the central part in the Book of Judges (Judges 3:7–16:31) can be divided into two panels based on the six refrains that state that the Israelites did evil in Yahweh's eyes:

Panel One

A 3:7 ויעשו בני ישראל את הרע בעיני יהוה

And the children of Israel did evil in the sight of the LORD (KJV)
B 3:12 ויספו בני ישראל לעשות הרע בעיני יהוה

And the children of Israel did evil again in the sight of the LORD

B 4:1 ויספו בני ישראל לעשות הרע בעיני יהוה

And the children of Israel did evil again in the sight of the LORD

Panel Two

A 6:1 ויעשו בני ישראל הרע בעיני יהוה

And the children of Israel did evil in the sight of the LORD
B 10:6 ויספו בני ישראל לעשות הרע בעיני יהוה

And the children of Israel did evil again in the sight of the LORD

B 13:1 ויספו בני ישראל לעשות הרע בעיני יהוה

And the children of Israel did evil again in the sight of the LORD

Furthermore, from the linguistic evidence, the verbs used to describe the Lord's response to Israel's sin have chiastic patterns and can be grouped to fit the division above:

Panel One

3:8 וימכרם, "and he sold them," from the root מָכַר, makar
3:12 ויחזק, "and he strengthened," from the root חָזַק, khazaq
4:2 וימכרם, "and he sold them," from the root מָכַר, makar

Panel Two

6:1 ויתנם, "and he gave them," from the root נָתַן, nathan
10:7 וימכרם, "and he sold them," from the root מָכַר, makar
13:1 ויתנם, "and he gave them," from the root נָתַן, nathan

=== The Samson Narrative ===
Chapters 13–16 contains the "Samson Narrative" or "Samson Cycle", a highly structured poetic composition with an 'almost architectonic tightness' from a literary point-of-view. The entire section consists of 3 cantos and 10 subcantos and 30 canticles, as follows:

- Canto I : the birth story of Samson (Judges 13:2–25)
- Canto II : the feats of Samson in Timnah and Judah (Judges 14:1–16:3)
- Canto III : Samson's exploits in the Valley of Sorek and the temple of Dagon (Judges 16:4–31).

The distribution of the 10 subcantos into 3 cantos is a regular 2 + 4 + 4, with the number of canticles per subcanto as follows:

- Canto I: 3 + 3
- Canto II: 3 + 3 + 3 + 5 (3 + 2?)
- Canto III: 2 + 2 + 3 + 3

The number of strophes per canticle in each canto is quite uniform with numerical patterns in Canto II showing a 'concentric symmetry':

- Canto I: 4 + 4 + 4 | 4 + 4 + 4
- Canto Ila: 4 + 3 + 3 | 4 + 4 + 4 | 3 + 3 + 4 (concentric)
- Canto IIb: 4 + 4 + 3 + 4? + 4 (concentric)
- Canto III: 4 + 4 | 4 + 4 | 4 + 4 + 4 | 3 + 3 + 4

The structure regularity within the whole section classifies this composition as a 'narrative poetry' or 'poetic narrative'.

Besides the thematic symmetry, parts of the narrative shows an observable structure with chapter 13 balances chapter 16 (each consisting of three sub-sections with a fourfold asking and answer discourse at the center) whereas chapters 14 and 15 show a parallelism in form and content.

=== Structure of chapter 14 ===
Chapter 14 has the following structure:

A. Samson went down to Timnah (14:1-4)

1. speech between Samson and parents/father
2. parental objection
3. Samson's rejection of the possibility of another woman.

B. Samson went down to Timnah (14:5-6)

1. action involving an animal (lion).

C. And he went down and spoke to the woman (14:7-9)

1. action involving honey, a gracious act

D. His father went down to the woman (14:10-20)

1. speech between Samson, Philistines and the Timnite;
2. Philistines threaten third party to beat Samson
3. Spirit of YHWH and Samson's victory.

== Samson wants to marry a Philistine woman (14:1–4) ==
The power struggles between Samson and the Philistines stem from the incident recorded in verses 1–4 of this chapter that starts with Samson "going down" to Timnah and "seeing" an attractive Philistine woman. Themes of Israelite status and the otherness of the Philistines ( 'us' versus 'them') are displayed in a tale of trickery and counter-trickery as God uses Samson to challenge the Philistines who 'rule over Israel at this time' (14:4). These themes are shown in the parental disapproving words to Samson concerning his chosen match (14:3; cf. Genesis 34:14—15) and in the ethnic way Samson describing the woman.

=== Verse 1 ===
And Samson went down to Timnath, and saw a woman in Timnath of the daughters of the Philistines.

- "Timnath" or "Timnah": now "Tel el-Baṭashi) located about 4 miles (6.4 km) west of Zorah and Eshtaol, on the southern side of the Valley of Sorek. Judges 1:34 notes that the Danites (Samson's tribe) failed to occupy the coastal plain and was confined to the hills, so from this higher ground, Samson "went down" to Timnah which was a Philistine town.

== Samson's wedding and riddle (14:5–20) ==
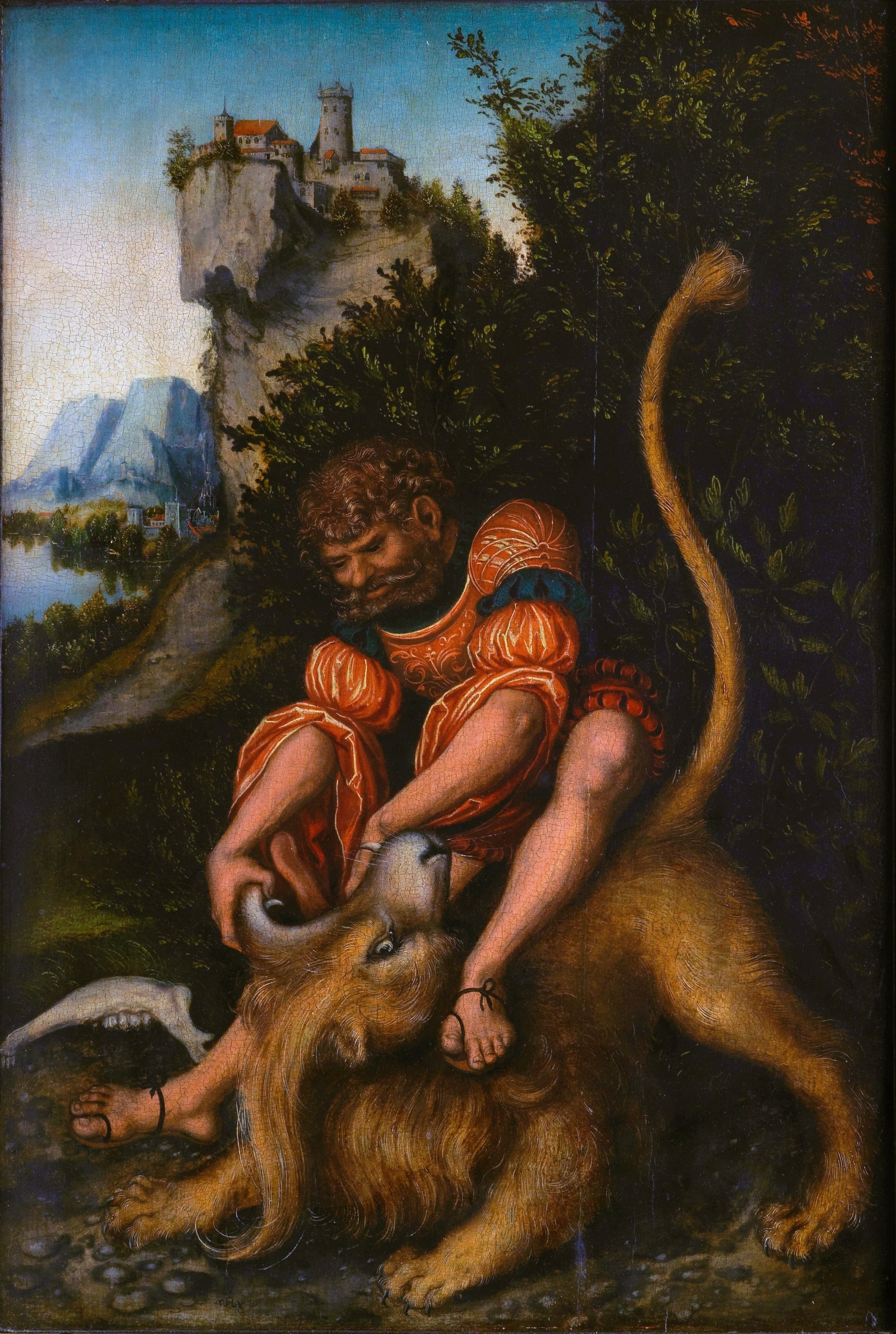
"Samson's Fight with the Lion"by Lucas Cranach the Elder (1525).

The killing of the lion with bare hands (verse 5) was kept secret (cf. verse 9) and led to the hidden answer to the riddle that follows (verse 14). This episode gives a portrayal Samson with a superpower which is followed superhuman feats against the Philistines (cf. 15:1,4; 16:1,3; 16:4, 9,12,14). The honey in the lion's carcass acts as a source of nourishment for a warrior (verse 8; cf. honey and Jonathan in 1 Samuel 14:27–29). The seven-day wedding feast between Samson and the Timnite woman becomes an occasion for trickery, as a possible union between opposing groups turned to resentment and destruction (ultimately God's plan for the Philistines, oppressors of Israel), where Samson is clearly an outsider surrounded by Philistines, and either side plays fair. In this chapter forward, the pattern of knowledge, deception, sexuality, and power intertwine in the Samson Narrative. Samson paid the loss of his riddling bet by killing thirty Philistines from another Philistine city, Ascalon, and gave the clothes to his riddle opponents in Timnath, but he immediately went back to his own people and did not consummate his marriage, so his father-in-law gave Samson's bride to another man, which becomes a set up for the fissure between Samson and the Philistines.

The center section of the riddle (verses 14–17) has a concentric symmetry highlighted by the words "tell" and "riddle" as follows:

A. Report

1. They could not "tell" the "riddle" for three days
2. On the seventh day, they approached the wife

B. The Philistines' speech

"Entice your husband to "tell" the "riddle"

X. Speech of Samson's bride

"You hate me, you do not love me,
You possed the "riddle" to my people
to me you did not "tell"

B'. Samson's speech

"I did not "tell" my father and mother
Shall I "tell" you?

A.' Report

2'. She wept for seven days
1'. On the seventh day, he "told" her

and she "told" the "riddle" to her people

The riddle itself was given with a high artistry of word play (verse 14), taking the three possible meaning of the root "'ry" (to "eat", "lion", or "honey") that the correct answer to the riddle would be ""^{a}ri mē ^{a}ri" ("honey from lion"). However, the Philistines avoided to give that answer which would betray their source of knowledge, and instead gave a counter-riddle as an answer: "What is sweeter than honey? What is stronger than a lion?" that the answer would be "love".

== Archeology ==
A circular stone seal, approximately 15 mm (0.59 in) in diameter, was found by the archaeologists from Tel Aviv University (announced in August 2012) on the floor of a house at Beth Shemesh and appears to depict a long-haired man slaying a lion, which may or may not depict the biblical Samson. The 12th-century-BCE seal was discovered in the geographical proximity to the area where Samson lived, and the time period of the seal indicates that a story was being told at the time of a hero who fought a lion, and that the story eventually found its way into the biblical text and onto the seal.

== See also ==
- Children of Israel
- Samson's father
- Philistines
- Spirit of the Lord
- Riddle
- Timnah
- Related Bible parts: Judges 13, Judges 15, Judges 16, Hebrews 11

== Sources ==
- Chisholm, Robert B. Jr. (2009). "The Chronology of the Book of Judges: A Linguistic Clue to Solving a Pesky Problem" (PDF). Journal of the Evangelical Theological Society. 52 (2): 247–55. Archived from the original (PDF) on 2022-11-08.
- Coogan, Michael David (2007). Coogan, Michael David; Brettler, Marc Zvi; Newsom, Carol Ann; Perkins, Pheme (eds.). The New Oxford Annotated Bible with the Apocryphal/Deuterocanonical Books: New Revised Standard Version, Issue 48 (Augmented 3rd ed.). Oxford University Press. ISBN 978-0-19-528881-0.
- Halley, Henry H. (1965). Halley's Bible Handbook: an abbreviated Bible commentary (24th (revised) ed.). Zondervan Publishing House. ISBN 0-310-25720-4.
- Hayes, Christine (2015). Introduction to the Bible. Yale University Press. ISBN 978-0-300-18827-1.
- Kim, Jichan (1993). The Structure of the Samson Cycle. Kok Pharos Publishing House. ISBN 978-90-390-0016-8.
- Niditch, Susan (2007). "10. Judges". In Barton, John; Muddiman, John (eds.). The Oxford Bible Commentary (first (paperback) ed.). Oxford University Press. pp. 176–191. ISBN 978-0-19-927718-6.
- Webb, Barry G. (2012). The Book of Judges. New International Commentary on the Old Testament. Eerdmans Publishing Company. ISBN 978-0-8028-2628-2.
- Würthwein, Ernst (1995). The Text of the Old Testament. Translated by Rhodes, Erroll F. Grand Rapids, MI: Wm. B. Eerdmans. ISBN 0-8028-0788-7.
- Younger, K. Lawson (2002). Judges and Ruth. The NIV Application Commentary. Zondervan. ISBN 978-0-310-20636-1.
