= Samson (1914 film) =

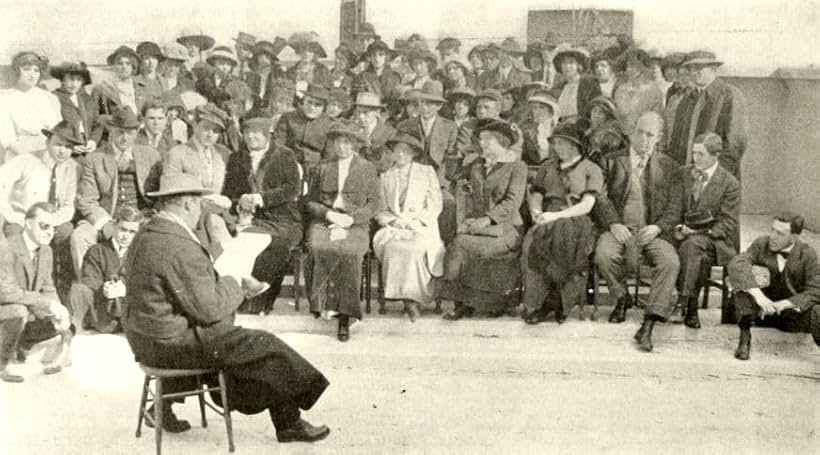
- Directed by: J. Farrell MacDonald
- Written by: James Dayton; Lorimer Johnston
- Produced by: Universal Film Manufacturing Company, Victor Studios
- Starring: J. Warren Kerrigan
- Distributed by: Universal Film Manufacturing Company
- Release date: April 30, 1914
- Country: United States
- Languages: Silent; English intertitles

Samson is a lost 1914 American silent drama film directed by J. Farrell MacDonald, from a story written by James Dayton and Lorimer Johnston. Harold Lloyd has an uncredited role.

== Cast ==
- J. Warren Kerrigan as Samson
- George Periolat as Manoah, Samson's father
- Lule Warrenton as Wife of Manoah
- Kathleen Kerrigan as Delilah
- Edith Bostwick as Zorah, Samson's wife
- Rose Gibbons as Sister of Zorah
- Cleo Madison as Jamin, the Philistine
- William Worthington as Ladal
- Marion Emmons as A Philistine lad
- Frank Borzage as Bearded Philistine Extra (uncredited)
- Mayme Kelso as Undetermined Role (uncredited)
- Harold Lloyd as Bearded Philistine Extra (uncredited)
- Hal Roach as Bearded Philistine Extra (uncredited)

== Preservation ==
With no holdings located in archives, Samson is considered a lost film.
