= Delilah =

Woman in the Book of Judges of the Hebrew Bible

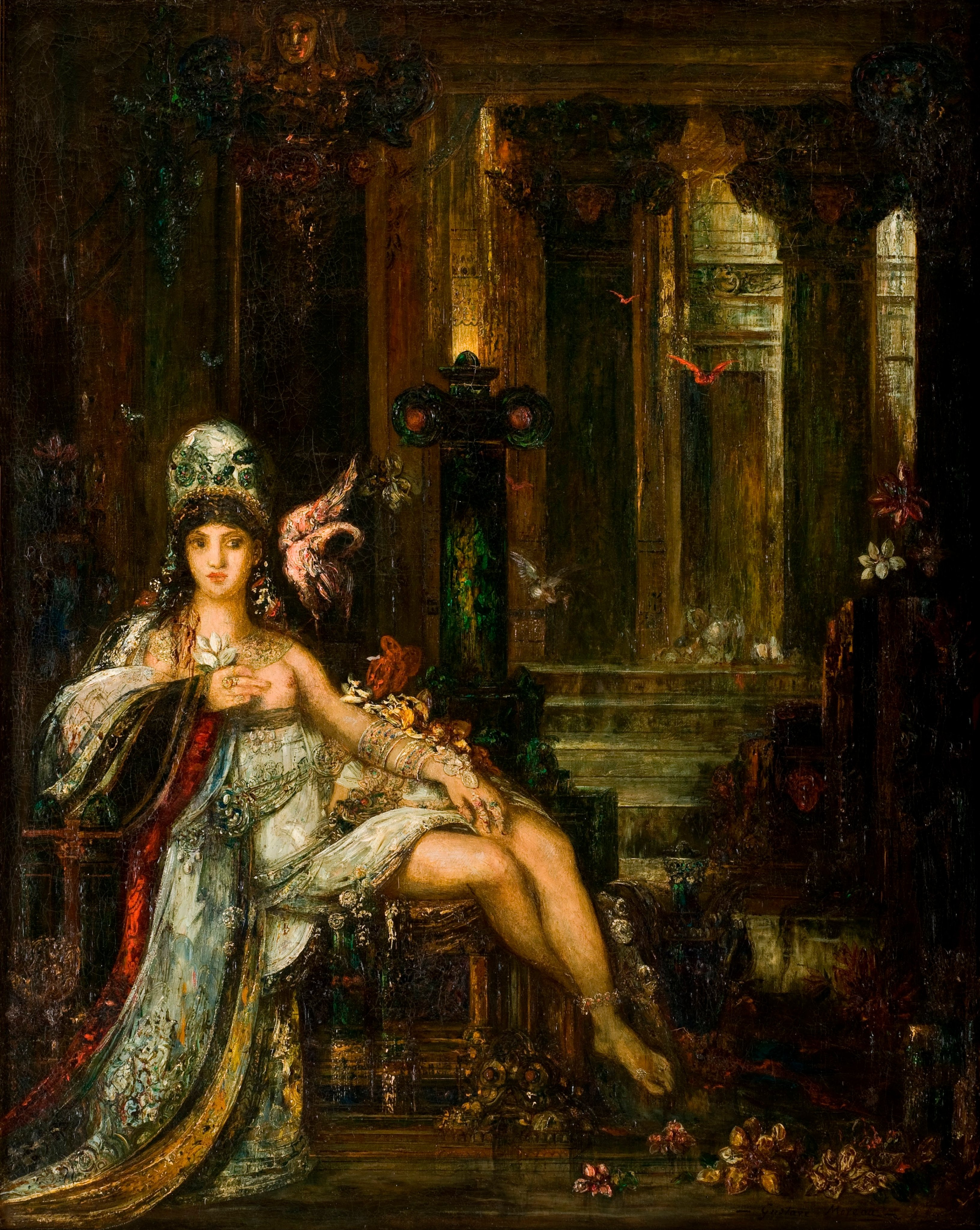
Delilah (c. 1896) by Gustave Moreau

Delilah (/dɪˈlaɪlə/ dil-EYE-lə; Hebrew: דְּלִילָה, romanized: Dəlīlā, lit. 'delicate'; Arabic: دليلة, romanized: Dalīlah; Greek: Δαλιδά, romanized: Dalidá) is a woman mentioned in the sixteenth chapter of the Book of Judges in the Hebrew Bible. She is loved by Samson, a Nazirite who possesses great strength and serves as the third last Judge of Israel. Delilah is bribed by the lords of the Philistines to discover the source of his strength. After three failed attempts at doing so, she finally goads Samson into telling her that his vigor is derived from his hair. As he sleeps, Delilah calls a servant to cut Samson's hair, thereby enabling her to turn him over to the Philistines.

Delilah has been the subject of both rabbinic and Christian commentary; rabbinic literature identifies her with Micah's mother in the biblical narrative of Micah's Idol, while some Christians have compared her to Judas Iscariot, the man who betrayed Jesus. Scholars have noted similarities between Delilah and other women in the Bible, such as Jael and Judith, and have discussed the question of whether the story of Samson's relationship with Delilah displays a negative attitude towards foreigners. Notable depictions of Delilah include John Milton's closet drama Samson Agonistes and Cecil B. DeMille's 1949 Hollywood film Samson and Delilah. Her name has become associated with treacherous and voluptuous women.

== In the Bible ==
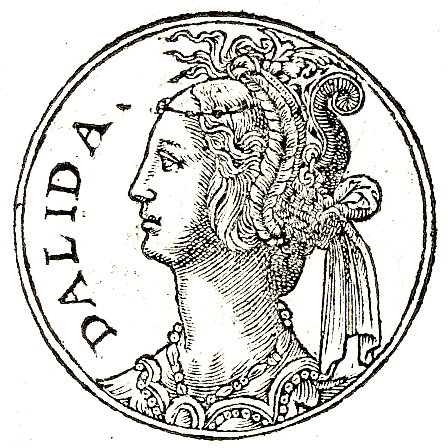
Delilah from the Promptuarium Iconum Insigniorum

Delilah is identified in the Book of Judges as a woman of Sorek. She is the only woman named in Samson's story, prompting scholarly analysis of her name's meaning. Her name resembles laylah, the Hebrew word for 'night,' which may connote flirtatiousness or that she was a lady of the night.

The Bible says that Samson loved her (Judges 16:4) but not that she loved him. The two were not said to be married and the idea that they had a sexual relationship is, in the words of Josey Bridges Snyder, "at most implicit in the biblical text". The lords of the Philistines bribed her to discover the source of Samson's great strength, each offering to give her 1,100 silver coins. Three times she failed.

First, at his own suggestion, she bound him with "seven green withes," but these he easily snapped asunder. Then she tied him with new ropes: these also failed. Then, she fastened the locks of his hair to the loom but with the same result. Finally, after many complaints that Samson did not trust her, he told her that his strength lay in his Nazirite vow, symbolized by his uncut hair. The Hebrew text of the Bible says she cut Samson's hair while he slept; other variations of the text say "a man" or "a barber" cut Samson's hair. She then awoke him, and delivered him into the hands of the waiting Philistine chiefs.

The Bible does not mention her fate, and, as James D. G. Dunn and John William Rogerson note in Eerdmans Commentary on the Bible, it never discusses whether Delilah felt guilt for her actions.

== Religious views ==
=== Jewish interpretations ===
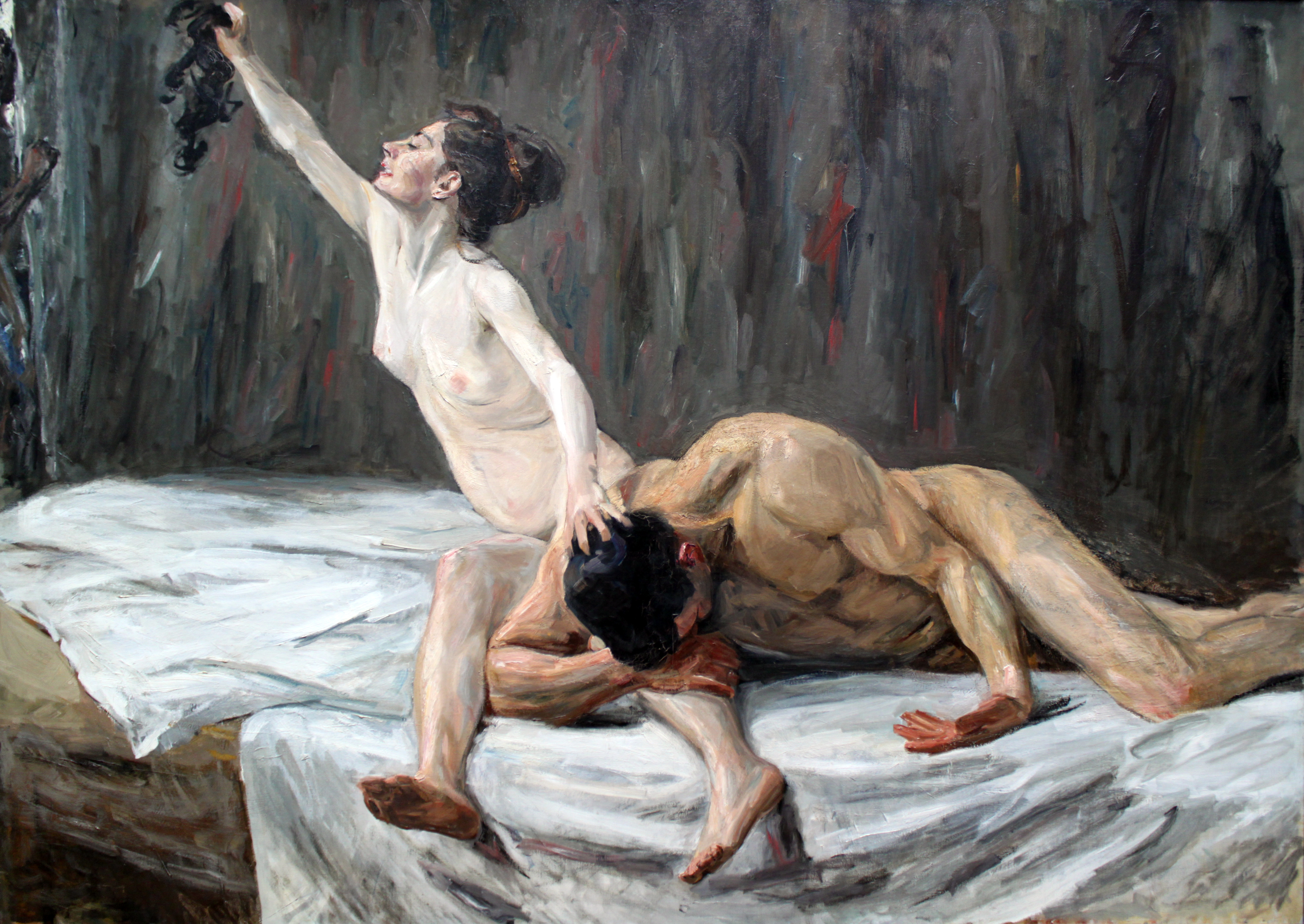
Max Liebermann's Samson and Delilah (1902)

Josephus and Pseudo-Philo both view Delilah as a Philistine and a prostitute; Josey Bridges Snyder theorizes that this may be due to the fact that Book of Judges portrays Samson as being attracted to both Philistine women (Judges 14:1) and prostitutes (Judges 16:1). Pseudo-Philo also writes that Delilah was Samson's wife. The Talmud says that Delilah used sex to get Samson to reveal his secret, in spite of the fact that the biblical text does not state that the two had a sexual relationship, while midrash state that Delilah harassed Samson verbally and physically during sex to get him to tell her the source of his strength. Midrashim on Delilah reveal negative attitudes toward non-Jewish women and are supposed to "demonstrate the havoc that a foreign woman could wreak". The midrash says that Samson lost his strength because of his relationship with Delilah, a foreign woman, and not because his hair was cut, and that the angel who foretold Samson's birth to his mother knew that Delilah would cause him to break his Nazirite vow.

The Jewish sages said Delilah's name implies what she did to Samson ("She dwindles"). Because Samson allowed his spiritual state to become diminished, he was vulnerable to losing his strength by having his hair cut. Even before Delilah is mentioned, the length of Samson's career is described. Normally the length of someone's life or career in the Old Testament is mentioned last for a character to signify the end of his relevance to the narrative. David Kimhi notes that it is mentioned at the peak of his career; which implies that mentions of Samson afterwards marks his decline and downfall. This might explain why Samson eventually told Delilah of his weakness, even though she repeatedly betrayed him before. It is possible he was not fully aware that cutting his hair would cause God to allow him to lose his strength; since it was actually the decline of his spiritual state that caused him to lose God's favor.

Late aggadah say that Samson and Delilah had sons together who were strong like their father; Eldad ha-Dani claims that their sons resided in the land of Havilah and each had voices as "triumphal...as a lion's roar". Medieval midrash propose that Delilah was the mother of Micah from the biblical narrative of Micah's Idol. This theory rests on the fact that, in Judges 17, Micah's mother gives her son 1,100 silver coins to construct his idol, similarly to how Delilah was promised multiple payments of 1,100 silver coins to betray her lover by the Philistine leaders. This tradition explains the conflation of Delilah and Micah's mother by noting that Bible introduces the narrative of Micah's Idol immediately after the narrative of Samson and Delilah. Rashi disputes this theory, as the Seder Olam Rabbah states that Micah and Samson were not contemporaries and that Micah lived during the time of Othniel.

=== Christian interpretations ===
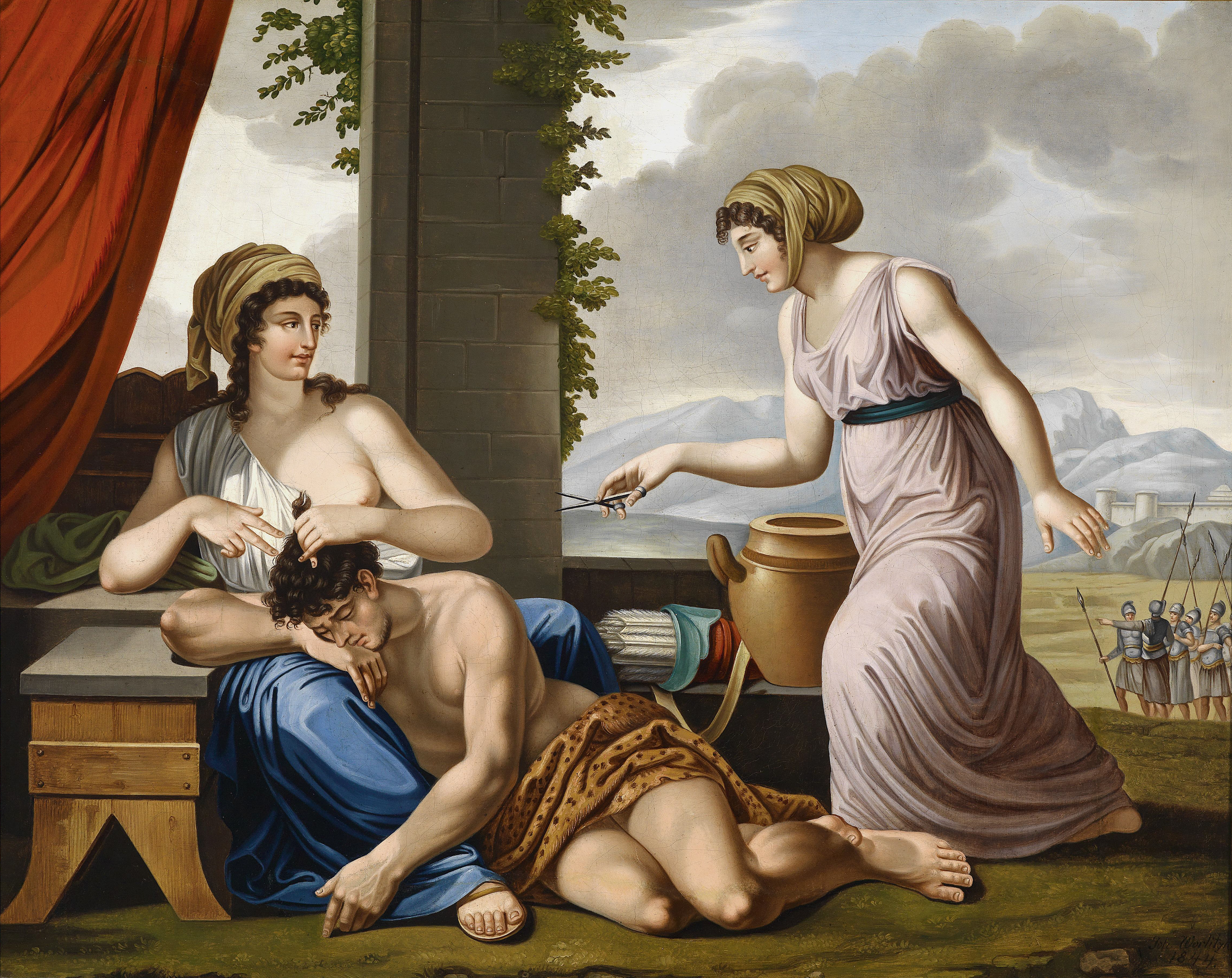
Josef Worlicek's Samson and Delilah (1844)

Most Christian commentary on Delilah condemns her. Ambrose, the Bishop of Milan from 374–97, represented Delilah as a Philistine prostitute and declares that "men should avoid marriage with those outside the faith, lest, instead of love of one's spouse, there be treachery." Marbodius of Rennes (d. 1123) used the examples of Delilah, Eve, Lot's daughters, Herodias, Clytemnestra, and Procne to illustrate that women are a "pleasant evil, at once a honeycomb and a poison".

Samson's betrayal by Delilah has also been compared to Jesus' betrayal by Judas Iscariot; both Delilah and Judas were paid in pieces of silver for their respective deeds. However, Thomas Cajetan, the head of the Dominicans until his death in 1534, viewed Delilah in a somewhat sympathetic light, suggesting that she never intended Samson to be killed or wounded. He asserts that Delilah accepted a bribe from the Philistine leaders because they convinced her that Samson would merely be weakened.

Caesarius of Arles (d. 542) viewed Delilah's temptation of Samson as similar to the temptation of Christ by Satan. Isidore of Seville (d. 636) saw Samson as prefiguring Jesus, but argued that "in yielding to Delilah, Samson did not prefigure Christ. Instead he exemplified the fall of the sinful man".

Similarly, Billy Graham of the Southern Baptist Convention (d. 2018) saw Samson's eyes being gouged out after he was handed over to the Philistines as his punishment for succumbing to his lust for Delilah; Graham also sees this as an example of the concept that one reaps what one sows.

== Scholarly views ==
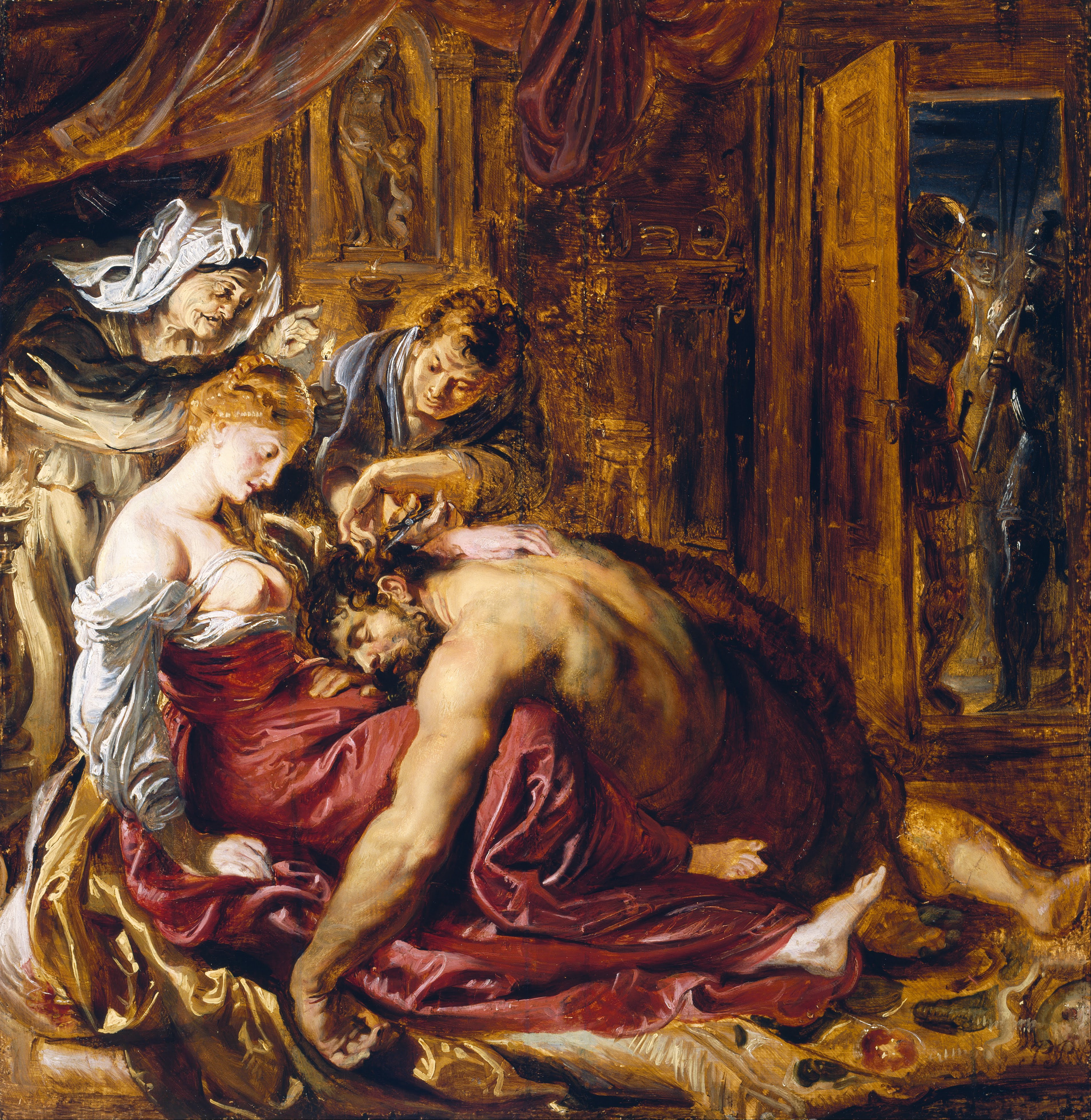
A sketch for Peter Paul Rubens' Samson and Delilah (c. 1609)

Delilah is usually thought to have been a Philistine, although she is not identified as such in the Bible. The name "Delilah" is a Hebrew name, however, numerous foreigners in the Bible have Hebrew names, so Delilah's name cannot be seen as indisputable proof that she was Hebrew. J. Cheryl Exum of the Jewish Women's Archive argues that the author of the Book of Judges would probably not portray Delilah in a negative light if she were a fellow Israelite. Samson was attracted to Philistine women; he had previously been married to one. Exum writes that the arguments that Delilah was a Philistine are inconclusive, while the Jewish Encyclopedia says that Delilah was a Philistine in all probability.

Dolores G. Kamrada write in Heroines, Heroes and Deity: Three Narratives of the Biblical Heroic Tradition that Delilah is similar to Jael, a woman mentioned in the fourth and fifth chapters of the Book of Judges who murders Sisera by driving a tent peg into his head, and frequently compared to the title character of the Book of Judith, who beheads Holofernes; all three women defeat powerful warriors. According to Susan Ackerman, Delilah differs from Jael and Judith in that she "sells out to the enemy, rather than the other way around".

Some scholarly commentary on Delilah centers on her gender. In the Feminist Companion to Judges, Carol Smith says that feminist commentators tend to stress Delilah's positive qualities, explain her negative ones, or ignore her in favor of "other biblical women who are more amenable to reinterpretation in a positive way". James D. G. Dunn and John William Rogerson feel that the Bible portrays Delilah as "a doubly dangerous woman given her apparent independence", noting that she is not "identified by a male relationship – the wife, daughter or sister of anyone" but simply "appears in her own right". Conversely, Phillip Lopate writes "while the message of Samson's fall, like Adam's, would seem to be cautionary and misogynistic, underneath we see his time with Delilah as a liberating fantasy....Don't we secretly rejoice at his having the good sense to follow the route of his desire, to free himself from the 'good boy' Nazirite onus by putting himself in temptation's way?"

Haaretz's Elon Gilad writes "some biblical stories are flat-out cautions against marrying foreign women, none more than the story of Samson", noting that Samson's relationship with Delilah leads to his demise. He contrasts this to what he sees as a more positive portrayal of intermarriage in the Book of Ruth. James D. G. Dunn and John William Rogerson say in Eerdmans Commentary on the Bible that Delilah exemplifies an important theme in the Book of Judges – a fear of assimilation. They see the narratives of Samson, Gideon, and Jephthah as cautionary tales against men choosing partners who could create "impure offspring". Melissa A. Jackson, in Comedy and Feminist Interpretation of the Hebrew Bible: A Subversive Collaboration, says that the Bible delineates between "good" foreigners like Tamar, Pharaoh's daughter, Rahab, and Ruth, and "bad" foreigners like Jezebel and Delilah. Contrariwise, Elizabeth Wurtzel sees Samson's relationship with Delilah as "the archetypal story of cross-cultural love between members of warring nations", akin to Romeo and Juliet.

== Cultural influence ==
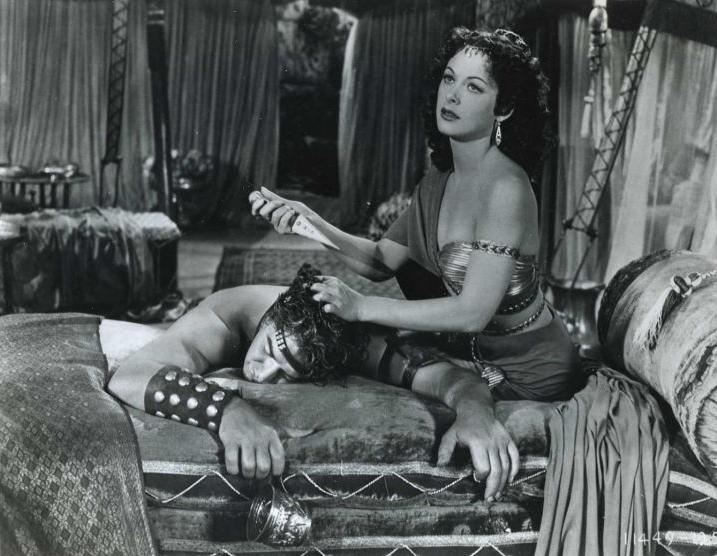
Victor Mature and Hedy Lamarr in the title roles of Cecil B. DeMille's Samson and Delilah (1949)

According to the Encyclopædia Britannica, Delilah's name has "become synonymous with a voluptuous, treacherous woman". The use of the name "Delilah" to connote deceit or betrayal can be found in works such as H. G. Wells' The Invisible Man (1897), the Tom Jones song "Delilah" (1968), Andrew Lloyd Webber's The Phantom of the Opera (1986), and Pat Conroy's Beach Music (1995). In One Thousand and One Nights, her name is applied to cunning women.

Delilah also appears as a character in a number of works of art. John Milton's closet drama Samson Agonistes, an allegory for the downfall of the Puritans and the restoration of the English monarchy, casts Delilah as an unrepentant, but sympathetic, deceiver and speaks approvingly of the subjugation of women. Scottish poet Carol Ann Duffy included an eponymously titled poem written from Delilah’s perspective in her poetry collection, The World’s Wife.

In 1735, George Frideric Handel wrote the opera Samson, with a libretto by Newburgh Hamilton, based on Samson Agonistes. The opera is almost entirely set inside Samson's prison and Delilah appears only briefly in Act II. In 1877, Camille Saint-Saëns composed the opera Samson and Delilah with a libretto by Ferdinand Lemaire in which the entire story of Samson and Delilah is retold. In the libretto, Delilah is portrayed as a seductive femme fatale, but the music played during her parts invokes sympathy for her. The narrative of Samson and Delilah is retold in indie pop singer Regina Spektor's "Samson" (2002), which includes the lyrics "I cut his hair myself one night / A pair of dull scissors and the yellow light / And he told me that I'd done alright."

During World War II, Alan Turing named his secret voice-encryption project, Delilah. In 1947 the Metropolitan Opera staged the world premiere of Bernard Rogers and Norman Corwin's opera The Warrior which tells the story of Samson and Delilah.

The 1949 Biblical drama Samson and Delilah, directed by Cecil B. DeMille and starring Victor Mature and Hedy Lamarr in the titular roles, was widely praised by critics for its cinematography, lead performances, costumes, sets, and innovative special effects. It became the highest-grossing film of 1950 and was nominated for five Academy Awards, winning two. According to Bosley Crowther of The New York Times, the film depicts Delilah as "a much more noble creature than legend would lead us to suppose". In Samson and Delilah, Delilah is the sister of Samson's wife, and repents cutting off his hair. When Samson prepares to collapse the pillars, Delilah does not follow Samson's advice to get out and she dies alongside him when the temple collapses. Actresses who have portrayed Delilah besides Lamarr include Belinda Bauer in Samson and Delilah (1984), and Elizabeth Hurley in Samson and Delilah (1996).

== General and cited references ==
- Wells, H. G. (1996). The Invisible Man. New York: Oxford University Press. ISBN 0-19-283195-X.
