= Gizo =

Gizo may refer to:

- Gizo, Solomon Islands, the capital of the Western Province in the Solomon Islands
- Gizo, Israel, a village in central Israel
- Gizo (Bible), a city mentioned in the Bible
- Gizo (or Gizzo), a trickster spider figure in Hausa folklore
