= Bayt Jiz =

Bayt Jiz بيت جيز Beit Jiz
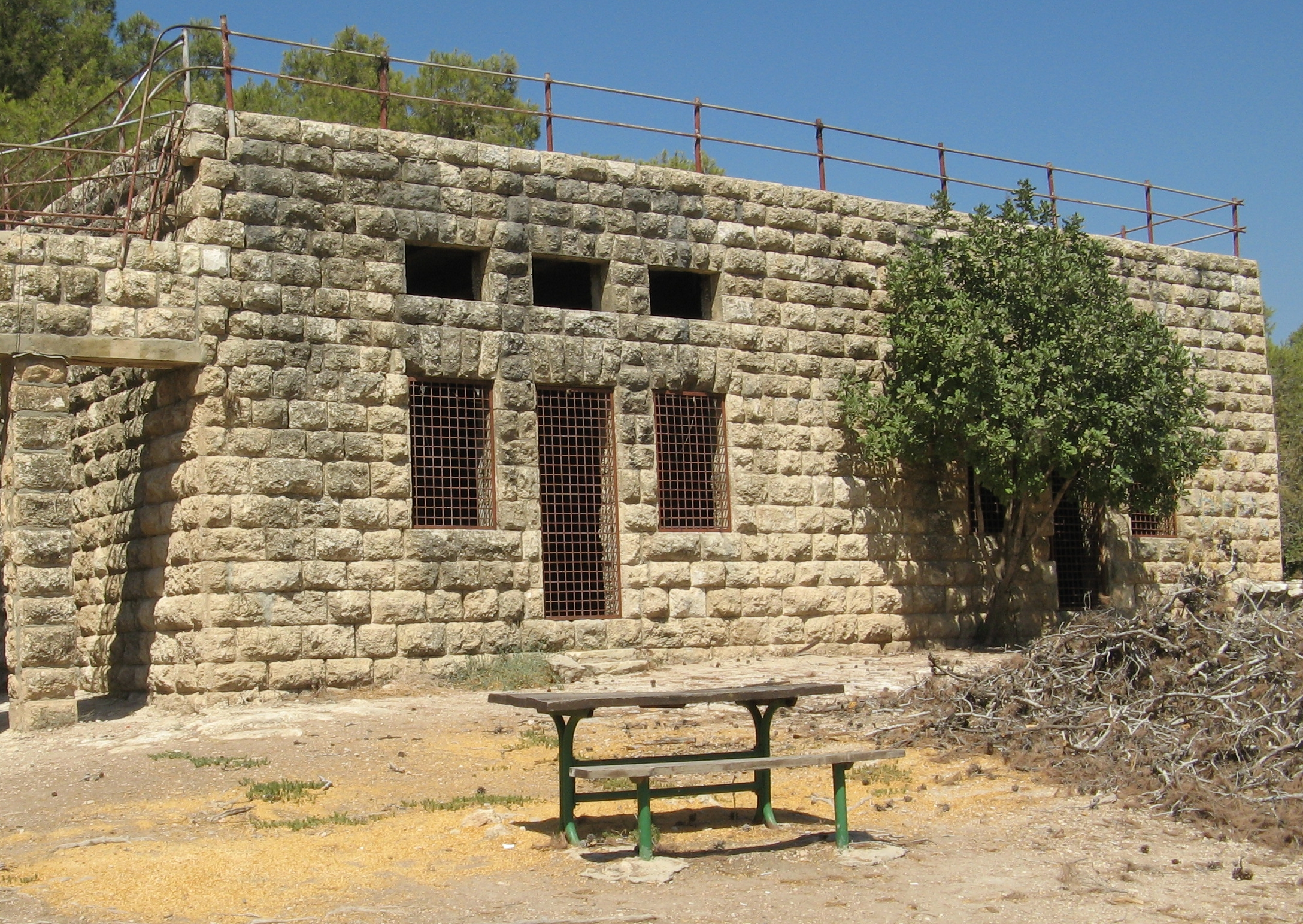
- The old school of Bayt Jiz
- Etymology: The ruin of the house of the valley side
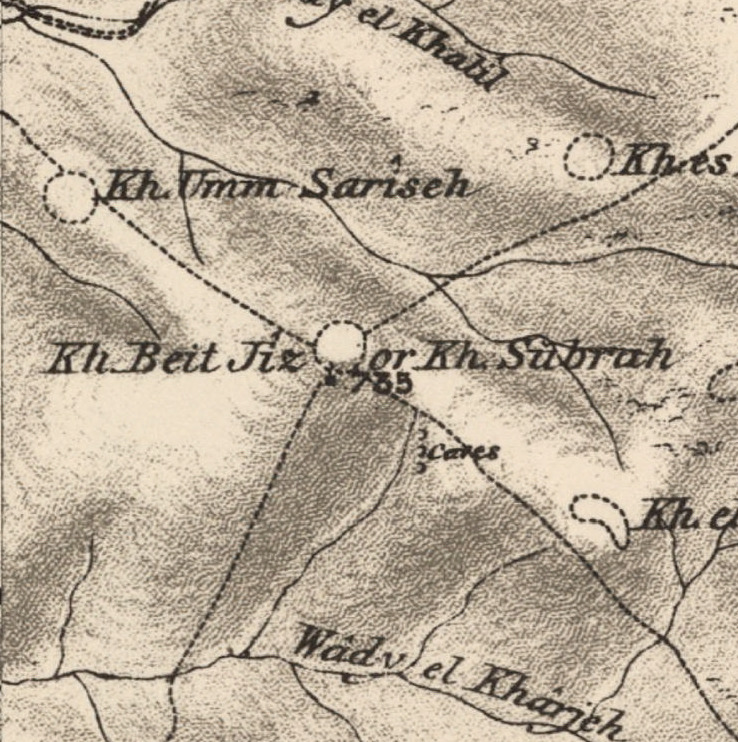
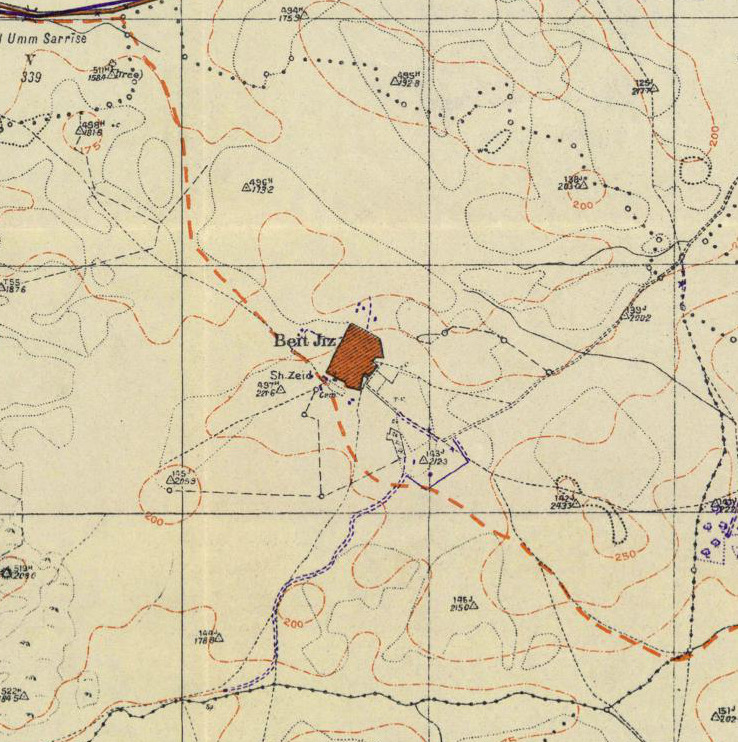
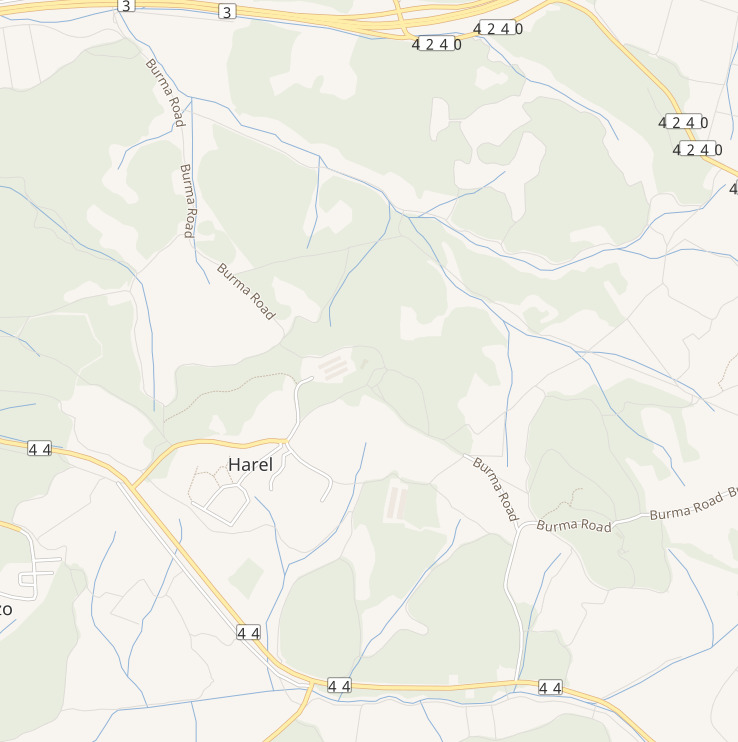
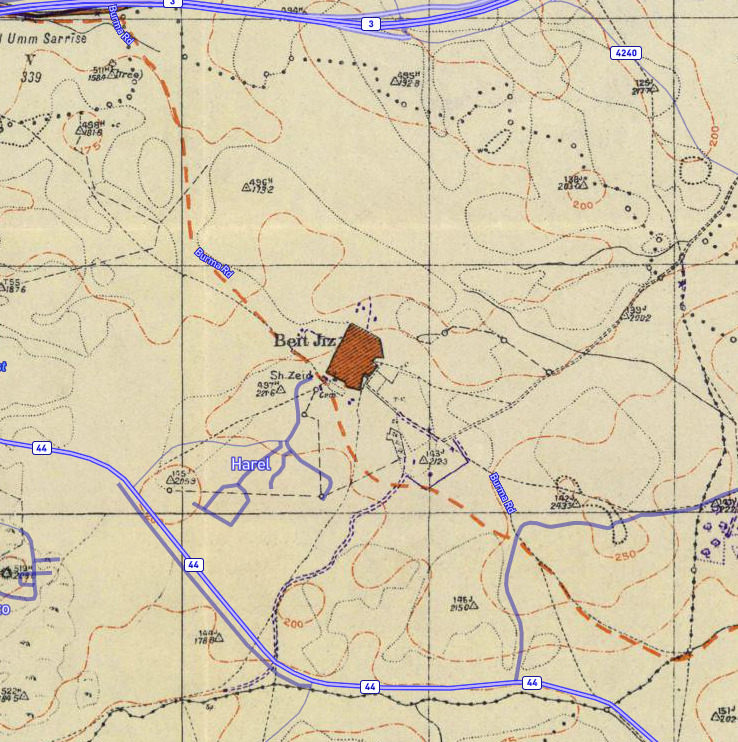
- 1870s map 1940s map modern map 1940s with modern overlay map A series of historical maps of the area around Bayt Jiz (click the buttons)

- Location within Mandatory Palestine
- Coordinates: 31°48′46″N 34°57′15″E
- Palestine grid: 145/135
- Geopolitical entity: Mandatory Palestine
- Subdistrict: Ramle
- Date of depopulation: 20 April 1948

Area
  - Total: 8,357 dunams (8.357 km^{2}; 3.227 sq mi)

Population (1945)
  - Total: 550
- Cause(s) of depopulation: Military assault by Yishuv forces
- Current Localities: Har'el, Tzelafon, Gizo

Bayt Jiz (Arabic: بيت جيز) was a Palestinian Arab village situated on undulating land in the western foothills of the Jerusalem heights, 15 kilometers (9.3 mi) southwest of Ramla. In 1945, it had a population of 550. It was occupied by Israeli forces in the 1948 Arab–Israeli War and became depopulated.

== History ==
Nearby Khirbet Bayt Jiz has been claimed as the site of the Biblical Gizo and has been linked to the Crusader settlement of Gith, although the latter association was dubbed as doubtful by some historians.

Since 1136, the village belonged to the canons of the Church of the Holy Sepulchre. By 1171, Gith was one of five villages within the Lydda diocese, in which the canons were permitted by the village bishop to have or build a church and control half the village's tithes.

Bayt Jiz is not recorded in early Arabic sources. According to local legend, the maqam ("sacred Muslim tomb") was built in 1334 to house the sarcophagus of Shaykh Zayd, a local sage. A stone with Arabic inscriptions was found near the maqam, attributing the building of the structure to a Mamluk commander named Sayf ad-Din Aqul. It is the only evidence of early Islamic activity in the village thus far.

=== Ottoman era ===
In 1838, it was noted as a place "in ruins or deserted."

In 1883, the PEF's Survey of Western Palestine described the place, called Khurbet Beit Jiz, as having "traces of ruins and a sacred Mukam. To the south are caves. There are foundations and cisterns among the ruins. On the south-west, in Wady el Kharjeh, are a number of pits containing a perennial supply of good water."

The modern village of Bayt Jiz was founded in the early 20th century. Residents from Kasla, Jerusalem settled the site, establishing it as a dependency - or satellite village - of their home village.

=== British Mandate era ===
In the 1922 census of Palestine, conducted by the British Mandate authorities, Bait Jiz had a population of 203 inhabitants, all Muslims, increasing in the 1931 census to 371, still all Muslims, in a total of 67 houses.

It had a rectangular plan, narrow streets, and houses constructed of adobe and stone. The village center included a mosque, some shops, and a school built in 1947, shared with nearby Bayt Susin. Bayt Jiz's economy was based on agriculture, with the main crops being grains, figs, vegetables, almonds, and olives. A part of the surrounding land was grassland, enabling the villagers to raise sheep and goats.

In the 1945 statistics the population was 550, all Muslims, while the total land area was 8,357 dunams, according to an official land and population survey. Of this, a total of 6,529 dunums of village land was used for cereals, 36 dunums were irrigated or used for orchards, while 29 dunams were classified as built-up public areas.

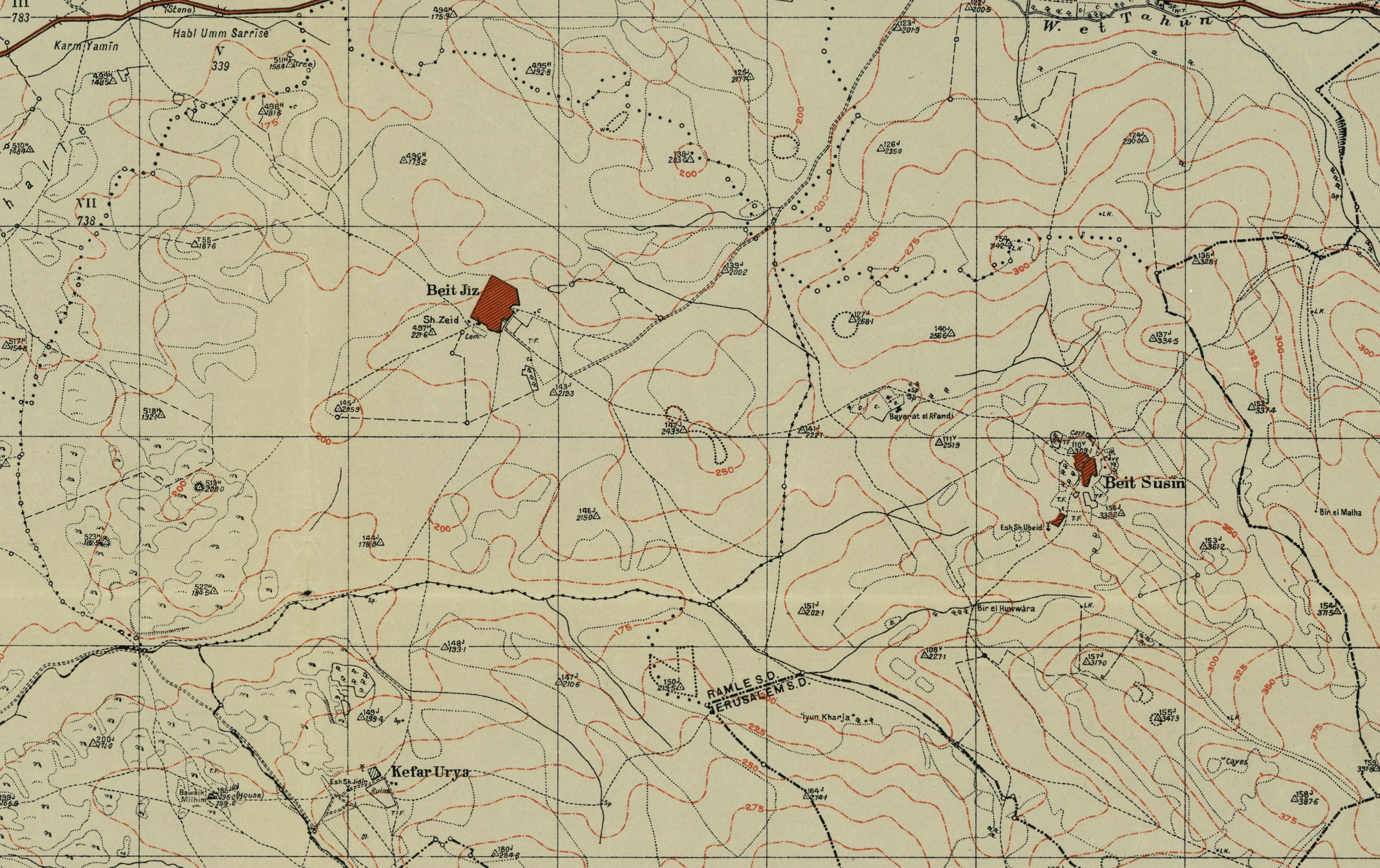
Bayt Jiz 1942 1:20,000

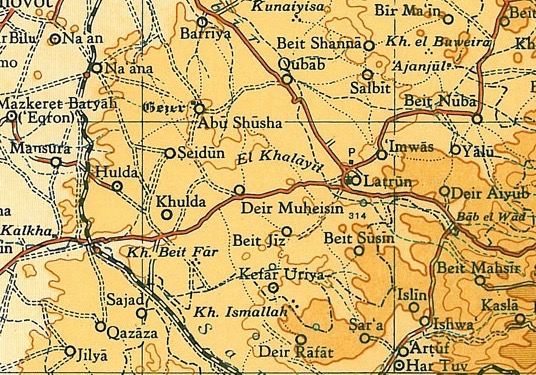
Bayt Jiz 1945 1:250,000

=== 1948 war and aftermath ===
According to Israeli historian Benny Morris, on 11 January 1948, Kfar Uriah was attacked by Arabs who came through neighboring Beit Jiz and Khirbet Beit Far. According to Morris, the residents of Bayt Jiz fled their village following an Israeli military assault against it on 20 April 1948. Nevertheless, Palestinian historian Aref al-Aref points out that the village had not been evacuated for the first assault of the Battle of Latrun that took place on May 22. He points out that the Israeli attack partly failed because the Israeli forces had received mistaken reports that the village had been evacuated. Consequently, they were surprised to encounter fierce resistance from the local militia as well as from Jordanian regulars in the Latrun sector who sent troops to the village.

Bayt Jiz was occupied by the 7th Armored Brigade of the Haganah in the interval between the first and second assaults on Latrun in late May 1948. A correspondent for The New York Times reported that the unsuccessful Israeli assault on Latrun spread to Bayt Jiz on May 25. He noted the battle around the village was the "biggest, single clash of the war to date". An Israeli army official announced the capture of Bayt Jiz on May 27, but al-Aref puts it at May 30.

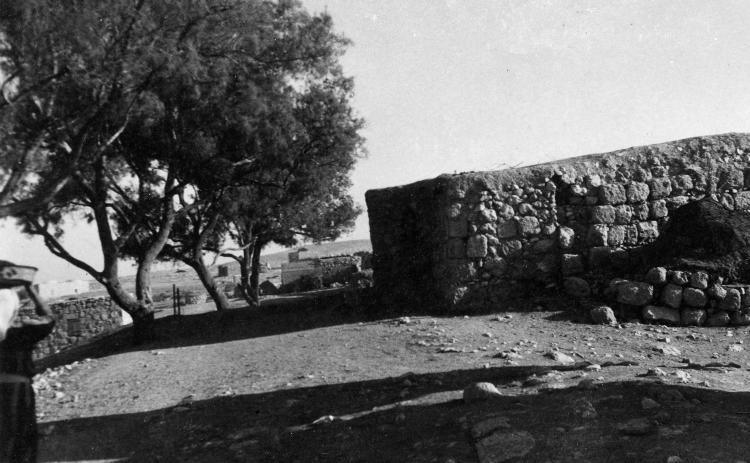
View of village before occupation, 1948

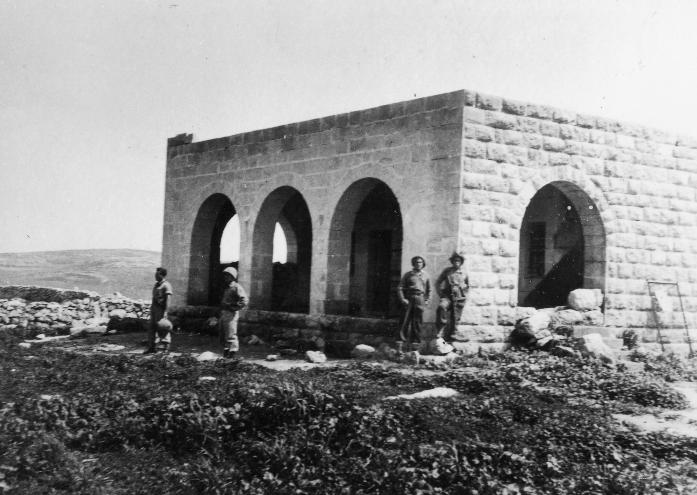
Building in Bayt Jiz used as a temporary HQ by the Harel Brigade, 1948

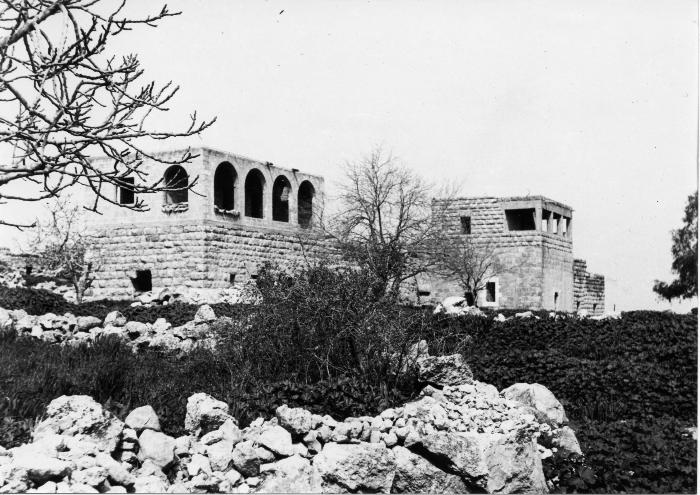
Bayt Jiz July 1948. Building used by the Harel Brigade as headquarters.

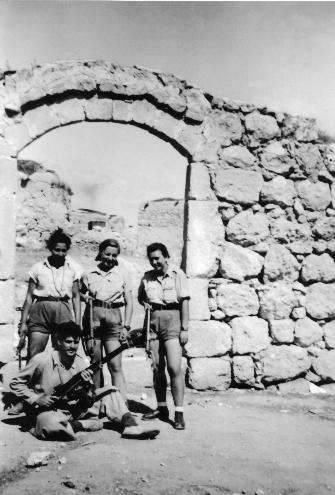
Members of Harel Brigade in Bayt Jiz, December 1948

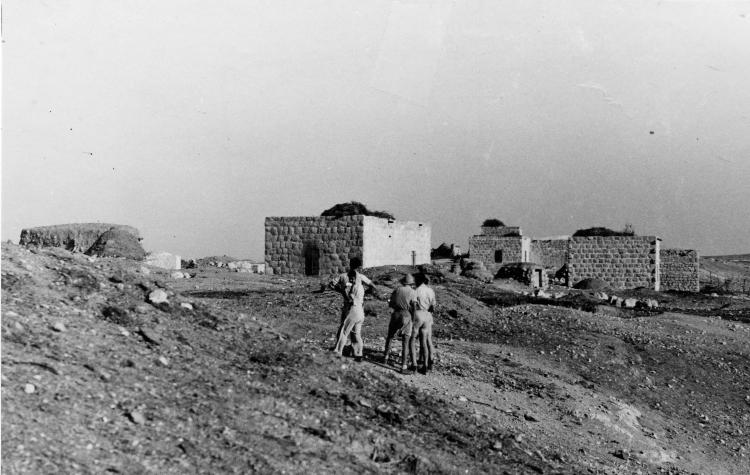
Bayt Jiz after capture by Harel Brigade, 1948. Original caption says: "Houses are full of fleas."

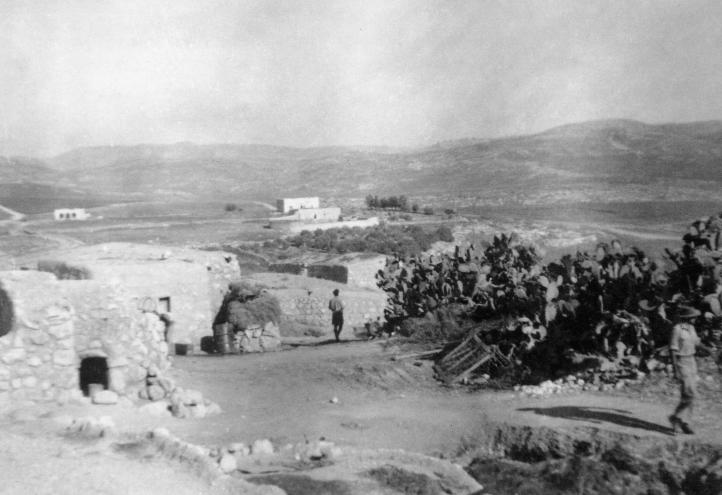
View of Bayt Jiz July 1948

A few days after, the Burma Road that crossed the village of Bayt Jiz was built by Israeli to counter the Latrun sector and to supply Jerusalem.

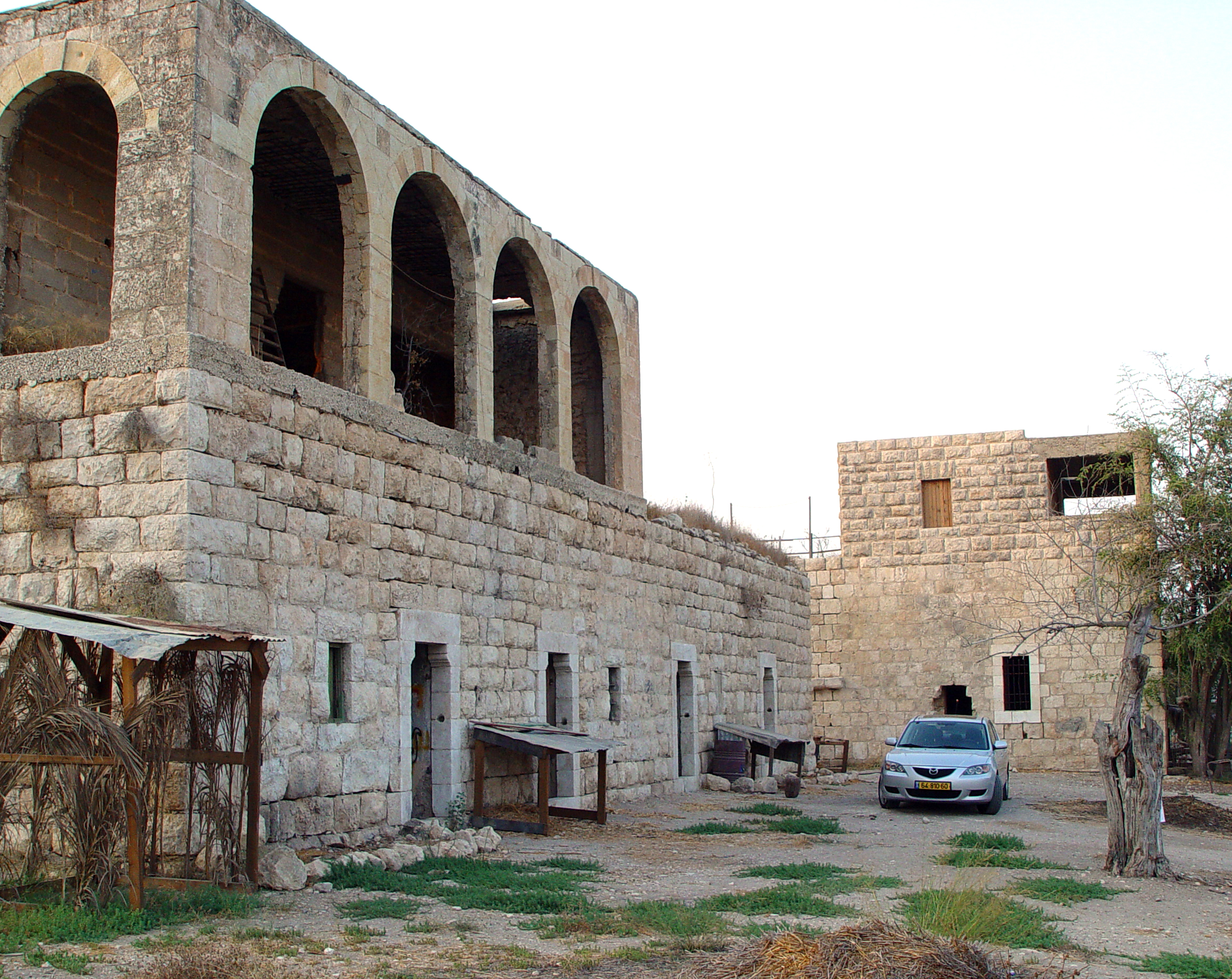
House from Bayt Jiz, presently in Harel, Israel

Three Jewish settlements were built on village lands, including Har'el in 1948, Tzelafon in 1950, and Gizo in 1986. Palestinian historian Walid Khalidi described the remains of Bayt Jiz in 1992:

"The school is the only remaining landmark and is used as a recreation facility, although a fire observation tower has been added to it. A number of houses remain. Some are used for storage, others are deserted. One of the storage houses is a large, stone structure, with a flat roof and a three paneled, lancet-arched side window. Three of the deserted houses are two-story structures"

Petersen, inspecting the place in 1996, found that the most distinctive extant building was the Maqam of Shayk Zaid. It was a tall, square building, covered with a domical vault. On the north wall there is a low doorway on the eastern side. Directly opposite the entrance (on the southern wall), is a shallow (0.35 m deep) mihrab. There is a small window (0.4m wide) in the middle of the east wall, while the west wall has collapsed.

== Demographics ==
The inhabitants of Bayt Jiz were entirely Muslim, and in a 1922 survey, they amounted to 203. In the 1931 British Mandate census there were 370 inhabitants and by 1945, Sami Hadawi recorded a population of 550. The projected population in 1948 was 638. According to Salman Abu Sitta, Palestinian refugees from Bayt Jiz and their descendants numbered 3,918 in 1998.

== See also ==
- Meir Tobianski
- Depopulated Palestinian locations in Israel

== Bibliography ==
- Abu-Nawar, Ma'n (1997). The Jordanian-Israeli War, 1948-1951: A History of the Hashemite Kingdom of Jordan. Garnet & Ithaca Press. ISBN 0-86372-286-5.
- Barron, J.B., ed. (1923). Palestine: Report and General Abstracts of the Census of 1922. Government of Palestine.
- Conder, C.R.; Kitchener, H.H. (1883). The Survey of Western Palestine: Memoirs of the Topography, Orography, Hydrography, and Archaeology. Vol. 3. London: Committee of the Palestine Exploration Fund.
- Hadawi, S. (1970). Village Statistics of 1945: A Classification of Land and Area ownership in Palestine. Palestine Liberation Organization Research Center.
- Khalidi, W. (1992). All That Remains: The Palestinian Villages Occupied and Depopulated by Israel in 1948. Washington D.C.: Institute for Palestine Studies. ISBN 0-88728-224-5.
- Mills, E., ed. (1932). Census of Palestine 1931. Population of Villages, Towns and Administrative Areas. Jerusalem: Government of Palestine.
- Morris, B. (2004). The Birth of the Palestinian Refugee Problem Revisited. Cambridge University Press. ISBN 978-0-521-00967-6.
- Morris, B. (2008). 1948: A History of the First Arab-Israeli War. Yale University Press. ISBN 9780300126969.
- Palmer, E.H. (1881). The Survey of Western Palestine: Arabic and English Name Lists Collected During the Survey by Lieutenants Conder and Kitchener, R. E. Transliterated and Explained by E.H. Palmer. Committee of the Palestine Exploration Fund.
- Petersen, Andrew (2001). A Gazetteer of Buildings in Muslim Palestine (British Academy Monographs in Archaeology). Vol. 1. Oxford University Press. ISBN 978-0-19-727011-0.
- Pringle, D. (1993). The Churches of the Crusader Kingdom of Jerusalem: A-K (excluding Acre and Jerusalem). Vol. I. Cambridge University Press. ISBN 0-521-39036-2.
- Robinson, E.; Smith, E. (1841). Biblical Researches in Palestine, Mount Sinai and Arabia Petraea: A Journal of Travels in the year 1838. Vol. 3. Boston: Crocker & Brewster.
- Röhricht, R. (1893). (RRH) Regesta regni Hierosolymitani (MXCVII-MCCXCI) (in Latin). Berlin: Libraria Academica Wageriana.
- Sharon, M. (1999). Corpus Inscriptionum Arabicarum Palaestinae, B-C. Vol. 2. BRILL. ISBN 90-04-11083-6.
- Village Statistics, April, 1945. Government of Palestine, Department of Statistics. 1945.
