= Ursuline Church of St. Michael =

Coordinates: 48°18′09″N 14°17′23″E

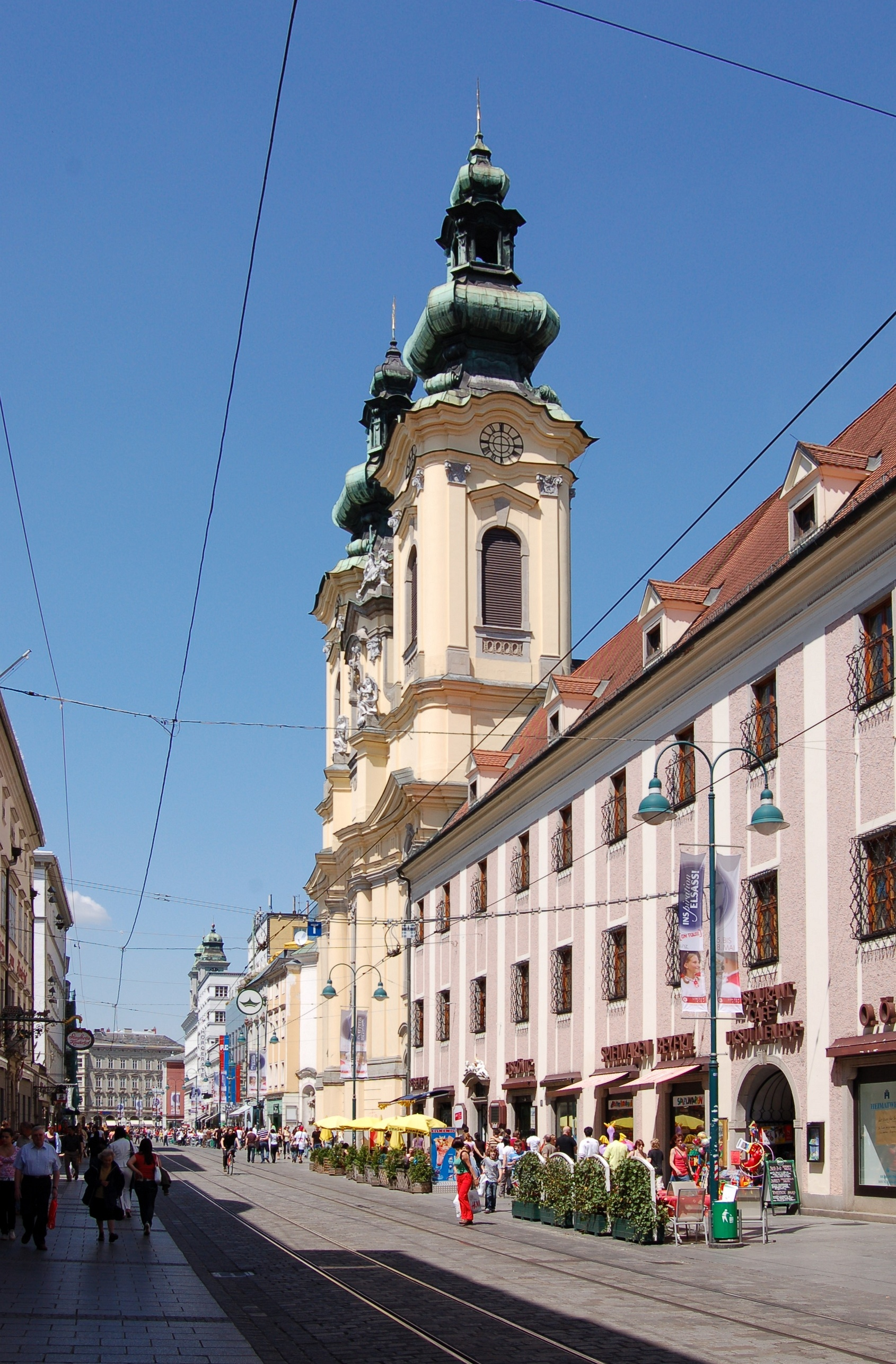
Ursuline Church

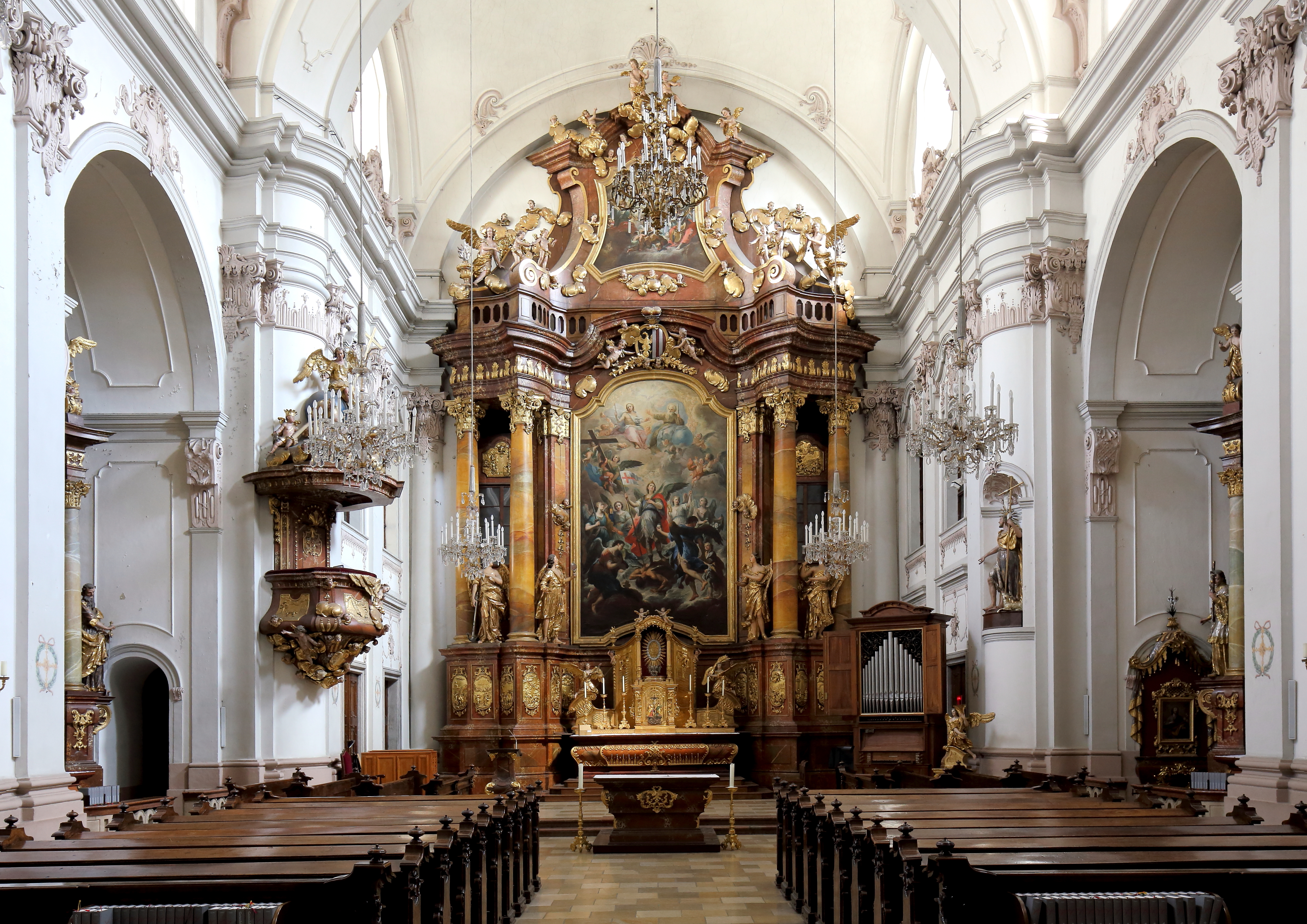
High altar

The Ursuline Church in Linz, Austria, dedicated to Archangel Michael, was built between 1736 and 1772 for the local Ursulines. It has two towers and a late baroque facade. The design was done by the architect Johann Haslinger. The church was dedicated in 1757.

It is connected to the former Ursuline convent, today a cultural center.

== Architecture, interior ==
Inside the church are altar pieces by Bartolomeo Altomonte.

The high altar was designed by Johann Matthias Krinner, and dedicated in 1741. The altar piece dates from 1738–1740, and is by Martino Altomonte. It shows the Archangel Michael in the center, surrounded by the archangels Gabriel and Raphael.

The late baroque chancel, from 1740, shows three scenes, Raphael walking with Tobias, Jacob's Dream, and The Sacrifice of Manoah. The chancel's sounding board shows the (then) four parts of the world: Europe, Asia, Africa, and America.

Since its restoration in 1985 the church serves as an art center and concert hall, and as parish church for the Forum St. Severin (Katholischer Akademikerverband der Diözese Linz).

== Organ ==
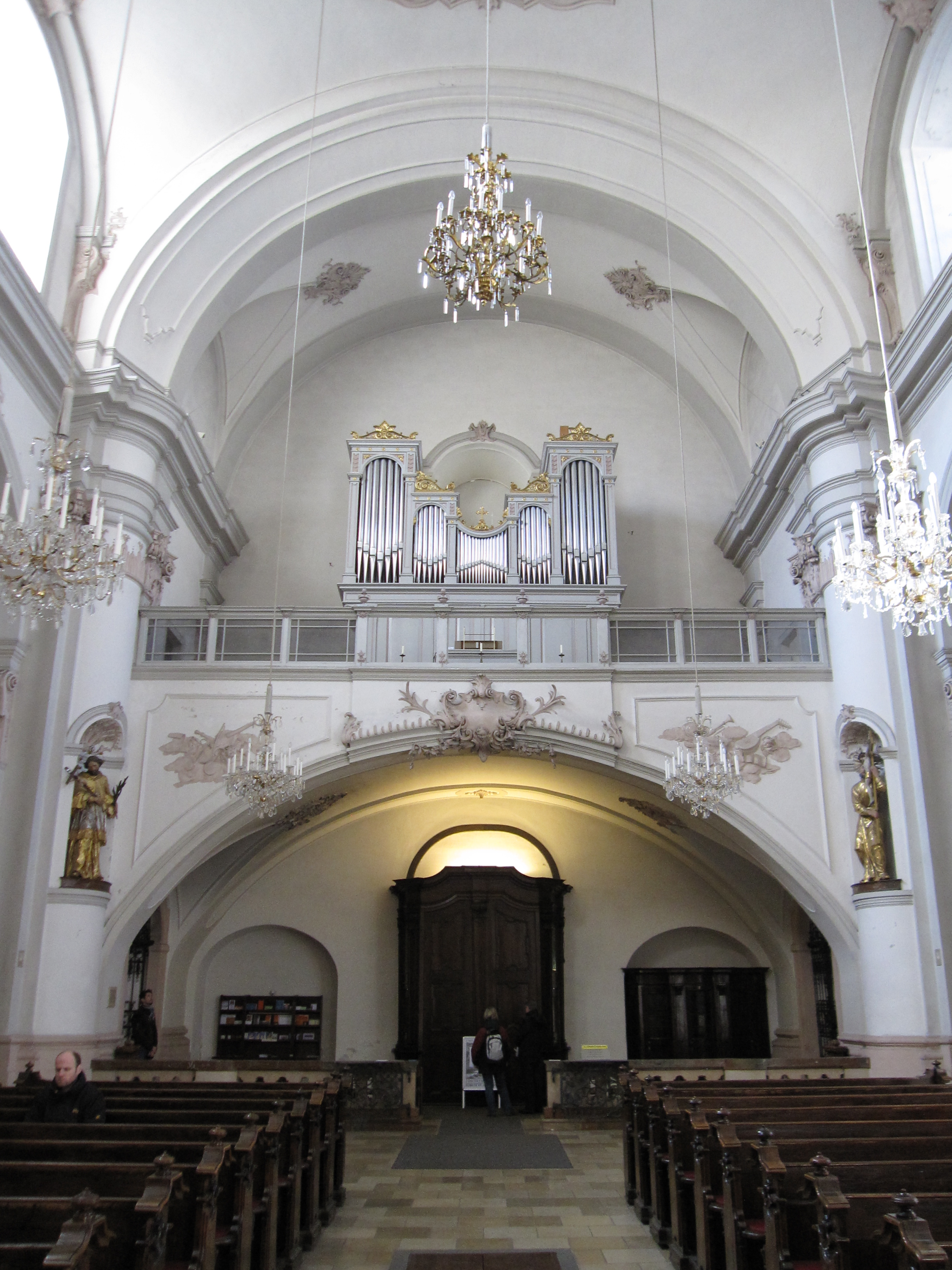

The church organ was built in 1876 by Franz Sales Ehrlich, and restored in 2006 by the Swiss organ company Kuhn.

== Bibliography ==
- Dehio Linz 2009, Obere und Untere Vorstadt, Sogenannte Ursulinenkirche Hl. Michael, pp. 212–216.
- Ursulinenkirche Hl. Michael. S. 18-19. In: Christoph Freilinger, Martina Gelsinger: Kirchen in Linz. Kunstführer, Dekanatssekretariat der Region Linz in Zusammenarbeit mit dem Kunstreferat der Diözese Linz, Linz 2009.
