= Man of God =

Biblical title of respect

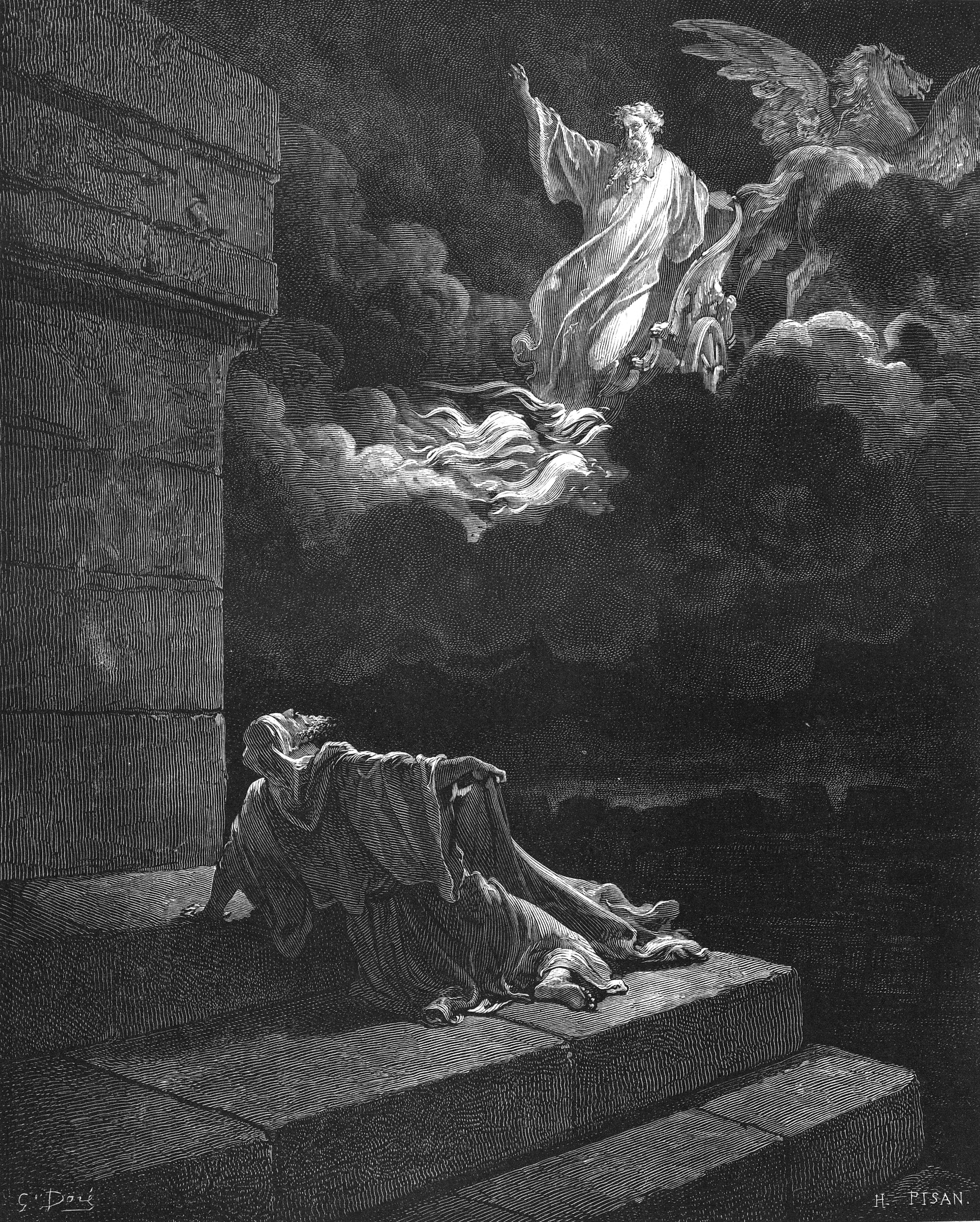
Elisha watches Elijah ascend to heaven (by Gustave Doré)

Man of God is a biblical title of respect applied to prophets, beloved religious leaders and even an angel and an Islamic title as well mostly for showing the humbleness and helplessness to God by humans. The term Man of God appears 78 times in 72 verses of the Bible, in application to up to 13 individuals:

- Moses (Deuteronomy 33:1; Joshua 14:6; Psalm 90:1; Ezra 3:2; 1 Chronicles 23:14; 2 Chronicles 30:16). Moses is the only person called “man of God” in the Torah.
- The angel of the Lord who appeared to Samson's mother (Judges 13:6, 8) whom she may have taken to be a prophet (Leviticus Rabbah 1:1)
- The man who chastised the Priest Eli (1 Samuel 2:27) whom Sifre identifies as Samuel's father Elkanah (Sifre to Deuteronomy 342:4)
- Samuel (1 Samuel 9:6, 7, 8, 10)
- David (Nehemiah 12:24, 36; 2 Chronicles 8:14)
- Shemaiah (1 Kings 12:22; 2 Chronicles 11:2)
- The man from Judah who cried out against King Jeroboam of Israel (1 Kings 13:1 (twice), 4, 5, 6 (twice), 7, 8, 11, 12, 14 (twice), 21, 26, 29, 31), whose tomb King Josiah protected and preserved when he destroyed the idolatrous tombs in Bethel (2 Kings 23:16, 17) and whom some rabbis identify as Iddo (Sifre to Deuteronomy 342:4; Pesikta de-Rav Kahana 2:85; Zohar 2:64a)
- Elijah (1 Kings 17:18, 24; 2 Kings 1:9, 10, 11, 12, 13)
- The man who told King Ahab of Israel that Israel could defeat the Arameans (1 Kings 20:28) whom Sifre identifies as Micah (Sifre to Deut. 342:4), but who from context might also be Elijah
- Elisha (2 Kings 4:7, 9, 16, 21, 22, 25, 27 (twice), 40, 42; 5:8, 14, 15, 20; 6:6, 9, 10, 15; 7:2, 17, 18, 19; 8:2, 4, 7, 8, 11, 19)
- Hanan son of Igdaliah (Jeremiah 35:4)
- The man who warned King Amaziah of Judah not to go to war (2 Chronicles 25:7, 9 (twice)), whom some rabbis identify as Amoz (Sifre to Deut. 342:4; Seder Olam Rabbah 20)
- Timothy (1 Timothy 6:11, 2 Timothy 3:17)

== Hebrew and Greek words ==
At Deuteronomy 33:1, for example, the Hebrew and Greek words for "man of god" are:

- Hebrew: אִ֥ישׁ -- "man"; הָאֱלֹהִ֖ים "of god" (full text)
- Greek (Septuagint): ἄνθρωπος -- "man"; τοῦ θεοῦ -- "of god" (full text)

== See also ==
- Theios aner
