= Samson in rabbinic literature =

Allusions in rabbinic literature to the Biblical character Samson, the ancient Israelite hero who fought the Philistines with supernatural strength, contain various expansions, elaborations and inferences beyond what is presented in the text of the Bible itself.

== Bedan ==
Samson is identified with Bedan (I Samuel 12:11); he was called "Bedan" because he was descended from the tribe of Dan, "Bedan" being explained as "Ben Dan".

== Ancestry ==
On the maternal side, however, he was a descendant of the tribe of Judah; for his mother, whose name was Zelelponith or Hazzelelponith, was a member of that clan (compare I Chronicles 4:3).

== His name ==
The name "Samson" is derived from shemesh ("sun"), so that Samson bore the name of God, who is also "a sun and shield" (Psalm 84:12); and as God protected Israel, so did Samson watch over it in his generation, judging the people even as did God. Samson's strength was divinely derived, and he further resembled God in requiring neither aid nor help.

== Jacob's blessing of Dan ==
In the blessings which Jacob pronounced on the tribe of Dan (Genesis 49:16-17), he had in mind Samson, whom he regarded even as the Messiah. Jacob compared him to a snake because, like the snake, Samson's power lay entirely in his head—that is, in his hair—while he was also revengeful like the snake; and as the snake kills by its venom even after it is dead, so Samson, in the hour of his death, slew more men than during all his life; and he also lived solitarily like the snake.

== His strength ==
Samson's shoulders were sixty ells broad. He was lame in both feet, but when the spirit of God came upon him he could step with one stride from Zoreah to Eshtaol, while the hairs of his head arose and clashed against one another so that they could be heard for a like distance. He was so strong that he could uplift two mountains and rub them together like two clods of earth, yet his superhuman strength, like Goliath's, brought woe upon its possessor. In licentiousness he is compared with Amnon and Zimri, both of whom were punished for their sins. Samson's eyes were put out because he had "followed them" too often. (i.e. as his eyes led him astray by lust, this was the reason he was blinded). When Samson was thirsty (compare Judges 15:18-19) God caused a well of water to spring from his teeth.

In the twenty years during which Samson judged Israel, he never required the least service from an Israelite, and he piously refrained from taking the name of God in vain. As soon, therefore, as he told Delilah that he was a Nazarite of God she immediately knew that he had spoken the truth. When he pulled down the temple of Dagon and killed himself and the Philistines, the structure fell backward, so that he was not crushed, his family being thus enabled to find his body and to bury it in the tomb of his father.

In the Talmudic period many seem to have denied that Samson was a historic figure, regarding him as a purely mythological personage. This is apparently the heretical theory which the Talmud attempts to refute, by giving the names of his sister (named Nishyan or Nashyan) and mother.
