= Harel, Israel =

Harel: הראל (Hebrew)
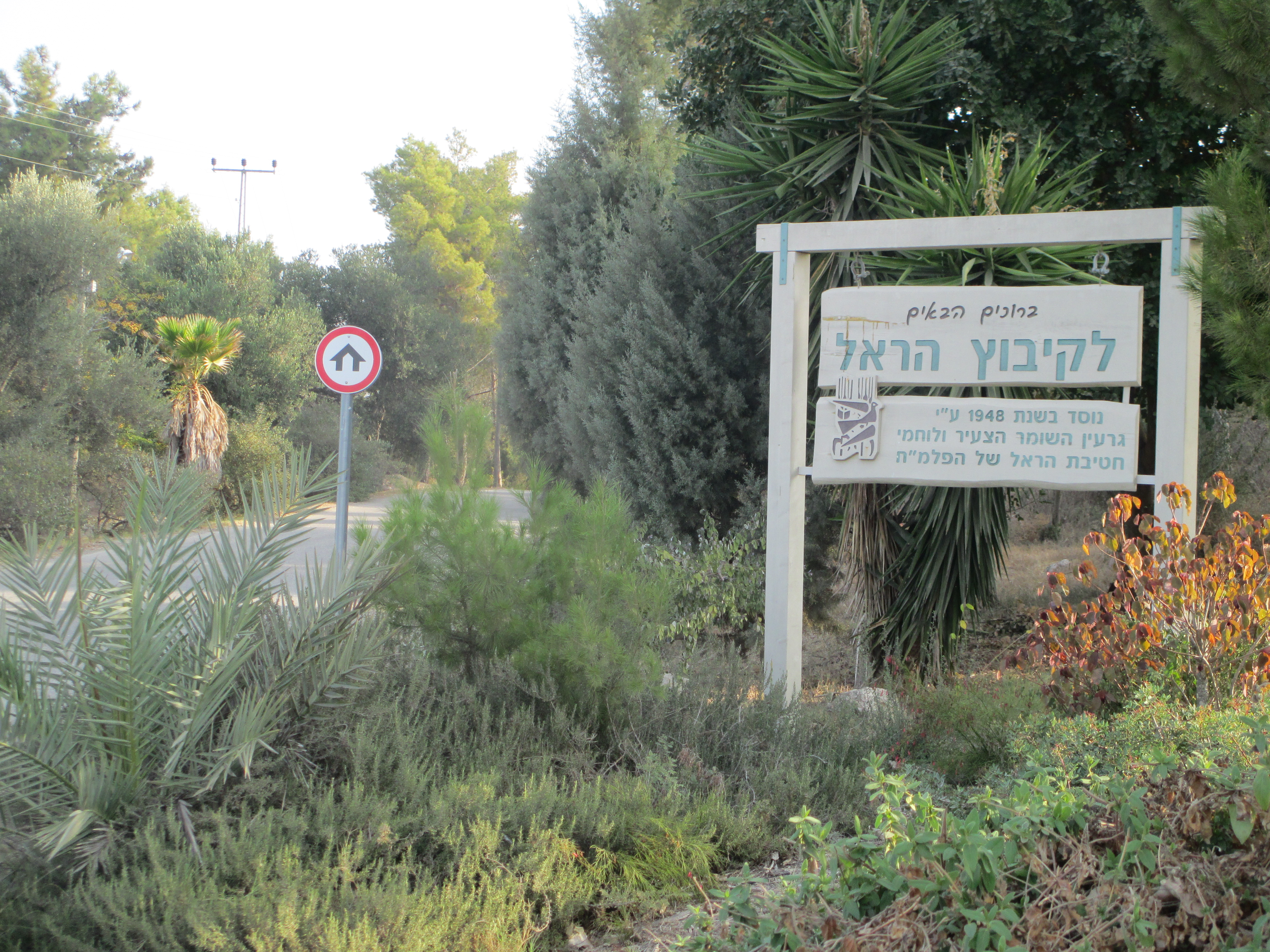
- Etymology: Mountain of God
- Location within Jerusalem District Location within Israel
- Coordinates: 31°48′34″N 34°57′0″E
- Country: Israel
- District: Jerusalem
- Council: Mateh Yehuda
- Affiliation: Kibbutz Movement
- Founded: 28 October 1948
- Founder: Demobbed Palmach soldiers
- Area: 12,000 dunams (12 km^{2}; 4.6 sq mi)
- Population (2024): 315
  - Density: 26/km^{2} (68/sq mi)
- Website: www.kibbutzharel.co.il

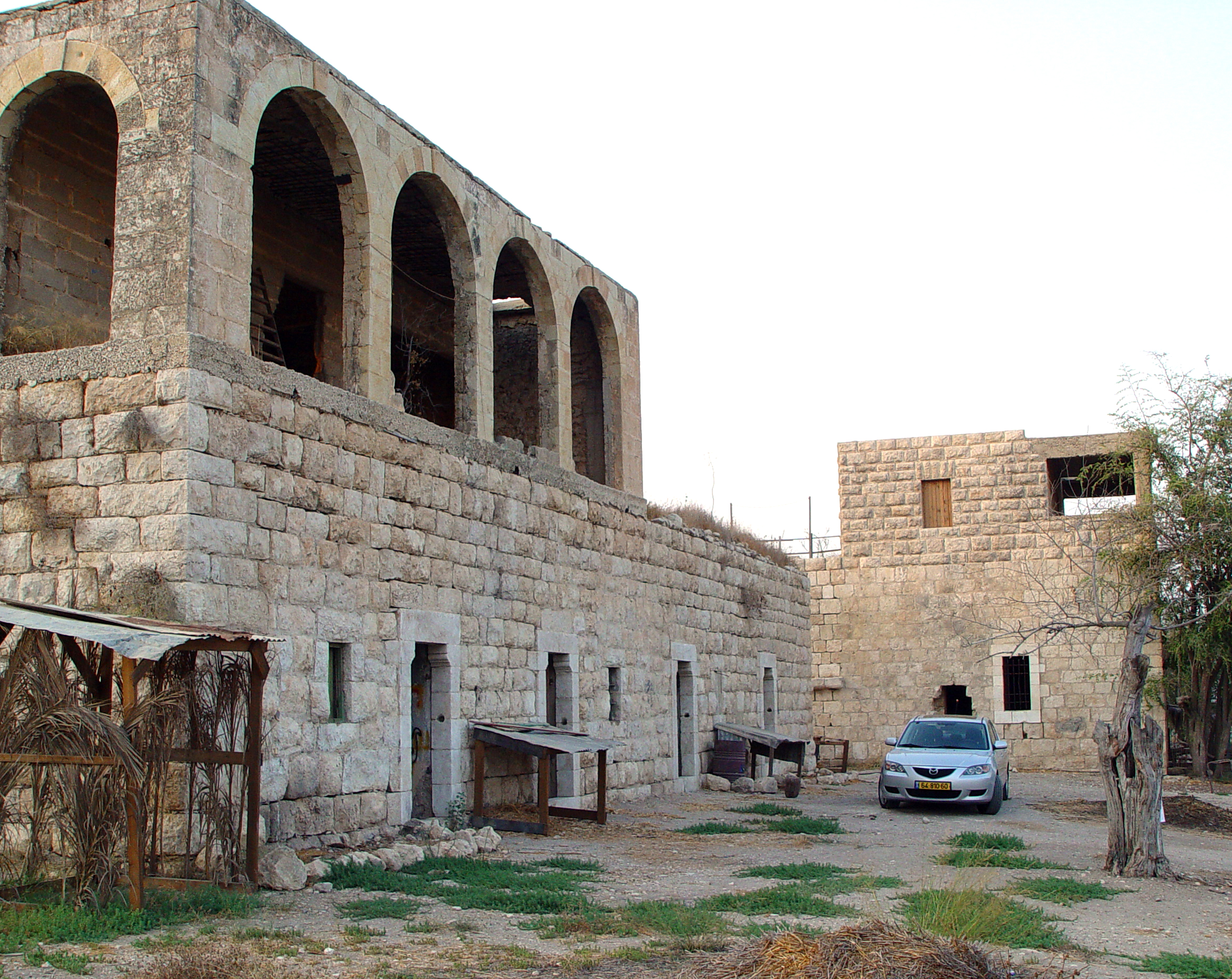
Beit-Ha'Kshatot ("House of the Arches") where Meir Tobianski was executed (1948)

Harel (Hebrew: הראל, lit. 'Mountain of God') is a kibbutz in central Israel. Located near Latrun with an area of 12,000 dunams, it falls under the jurisdiction of Mateh Yehuda Regional Council. In 2024 it had a population of 315.

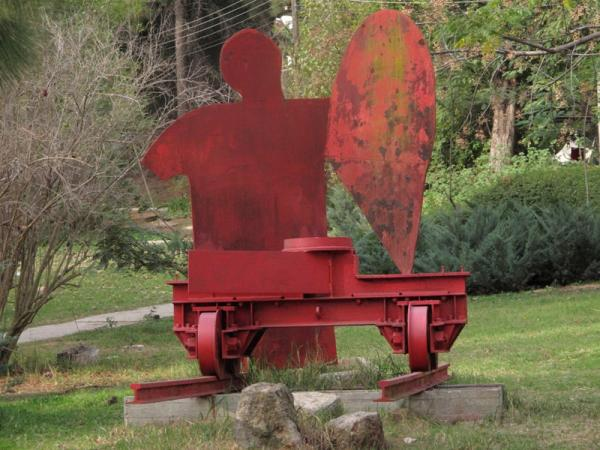
Sculpture by Igael Tumarkin at kibbutz Harel

== History ==
Harel was established on 28 October 1948 on the land of the depopulated Palestinian village of Bayt Jiz. It was named for the Harel Brigade of the Palmach, which its founders had been members of. The building from which Yitzhak Rabin commanded the Harel Brigade is located in the grounds of the kibbutz. Most of the founders were Sabras, although some were new immigrants from Hungary and Poland.

A pre-Roman wine press was discovered in the kibbutz vineyards.

Clos de Gat winery, established in 1998, produces around 90,000 bottles annually. The grapes come from 130 dunams of vineyards on the outskirts of the kibbutz.

== Notable people ==
- Dani Karavan, sculptor
- Yaakov Agmon, theatre producer

== Gallery ==
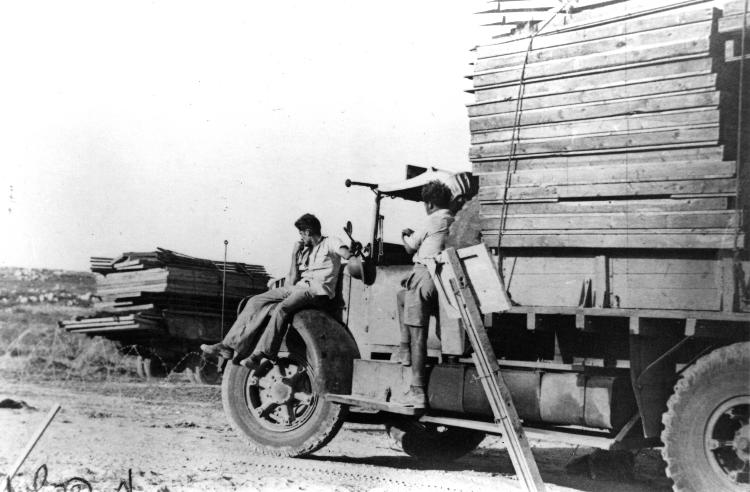
Arrival of material for construction of first buildings at Harel

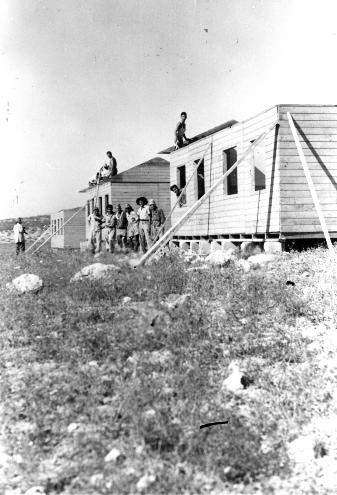
The first barracks being assembled at Harel

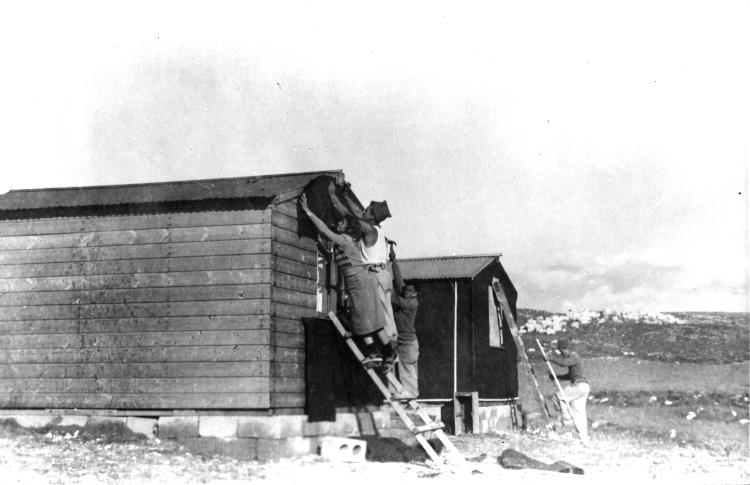
Weatherproofing being fixed to the exterior of first cabins at Harel. 27 October 1948.

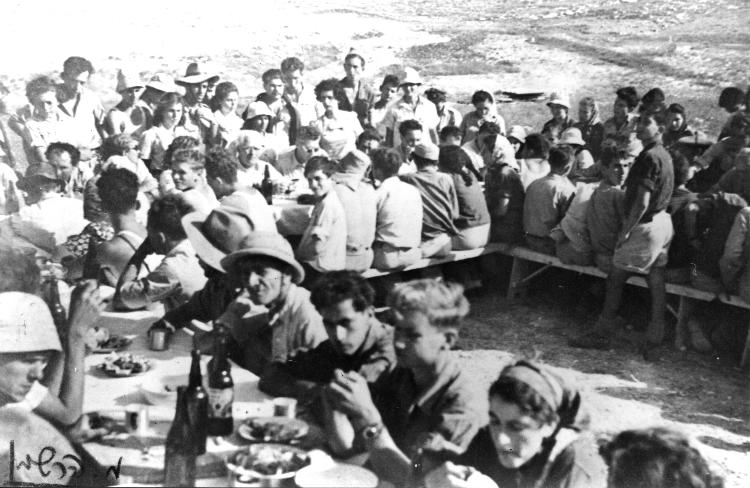
Members of the Yiftach Brigade celebrating the establishment of Harel

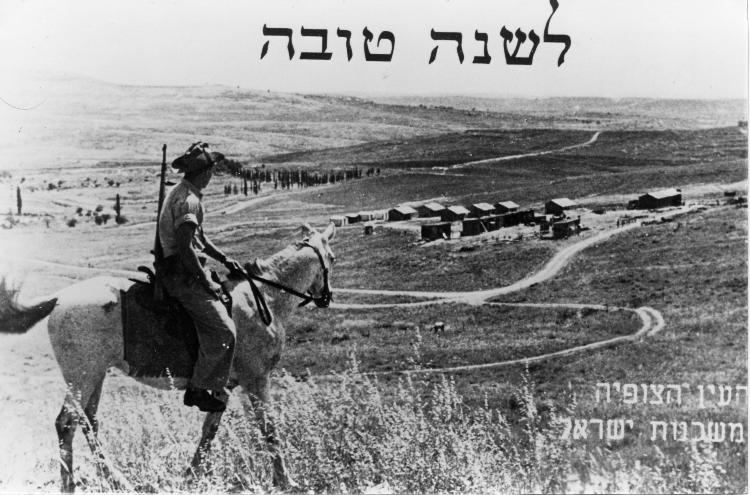
General view of kibbutz Harel shortly after establishment

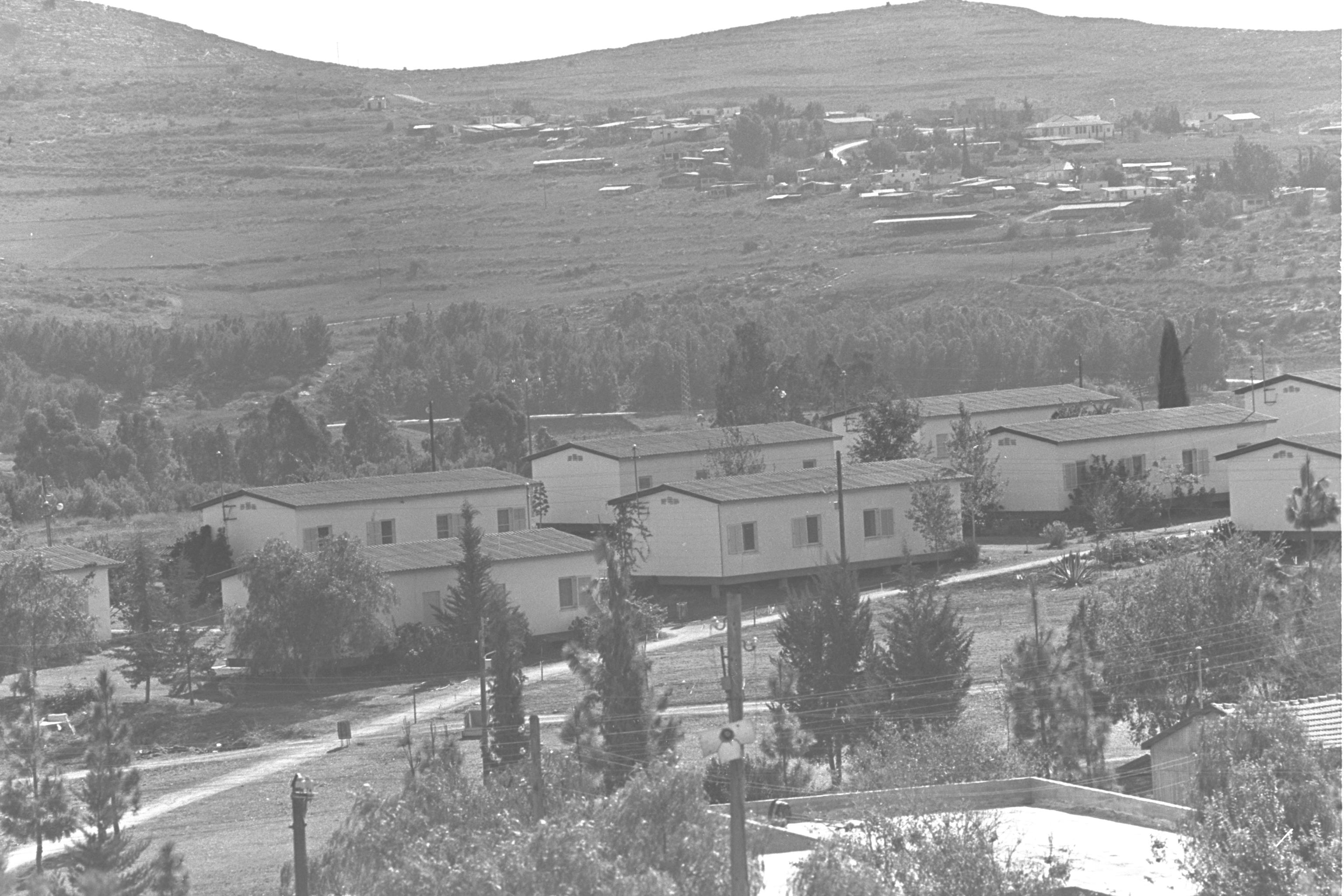
Harel 1970
