= Theios aner =

Theios aner (Ancient Greek, θεῖος ἀνήρ) is a term within Greek philosophy translatable as "divine man". Its meaning has been debated through history, but it generally means the figure of a person connected to the gods, which grants him the ability to perform miracles and supernatural events.

== History ==
This concept originated in the Hellenistic period, where it was used in a syncretic context, though differentiated from foreign figures like the Phoenician prophets mentioned by Celsus. Famous exponents of theios aner were the famed Pythagoras, Empedocles, Apollonius of Tyana, Peregrinus Proteus and Alexander of Abonoteichus, among others. Precisely due to those illustrious connotations, the term would have been chosen by writers of Judaism as a way to make figures like that of Moses more palatable to Greek thinking.

It was seemingly during the rise of Christianity when the term popularized, in no small part for its association to the figure of Jesus of Nazareth as a maker of miracles. Paul's Pagan opponents considered Jesus a mere member of this tradition instead of the Son of God as he preached, which might have influenced the writing of gospels to avoid this identification. The Gospel of Mark, which already intended to fend off the newly formed Docetic Gnosticism by emphasizing Jesus' human traits, was also object of this reaction, as it identifies other miracle-makers as false prophets.

== See also ==
- Christology
- Man of God
- Thaumaturgy
