= Hazzelelponi =

Biblical character

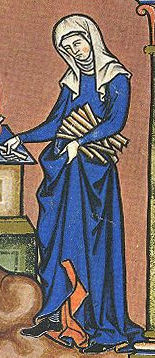
- A depiction of Manoah's wife, a biblical figure sometimes identified with Hazzelelponi
- Born: Unknown; Tribe of Judah, Ancient Israel
- Known for: Sister of Jezreel, Ishma, and Idbash; possibly the wife of Manoah and mother of Samson
- Spouse: Manoah (according to tradition)
- Children: Samson, Nishyan or Nashyan (according to tradition)
- Parent: Etam

Hazzelelponi (Hebrew: הַצְּלֶלְפּוֹנִי Haṣṣəlelpōnī, "the shade-facing") is a biblical woman mentioned in 1 Chronicles 4:3. Tzelafon was named after her.

Hazzelelponi was a daughter of a man named Etam and thus a descendant of Judah.

She was also a sister of Jezreel, Ishma and Idbash, of the tribe of Judah.

== Zelelponith ==
Under the name Zelelponith, she is referred to in rabbinical sources—Midrash Numbers Rabbah Naso 10 and Bava Batra 91a—as being the wife of Manoah and mother of Samson, the famous judge.

According to the ancient Rabbinic tradition, Hazzelelponi was married to Manoah. She also had a daughter called Nishyan or Nashyan.

== See also ==
- List of names for the biblical nameless
- Manoah's wife
