= Manoah =

Biblical character

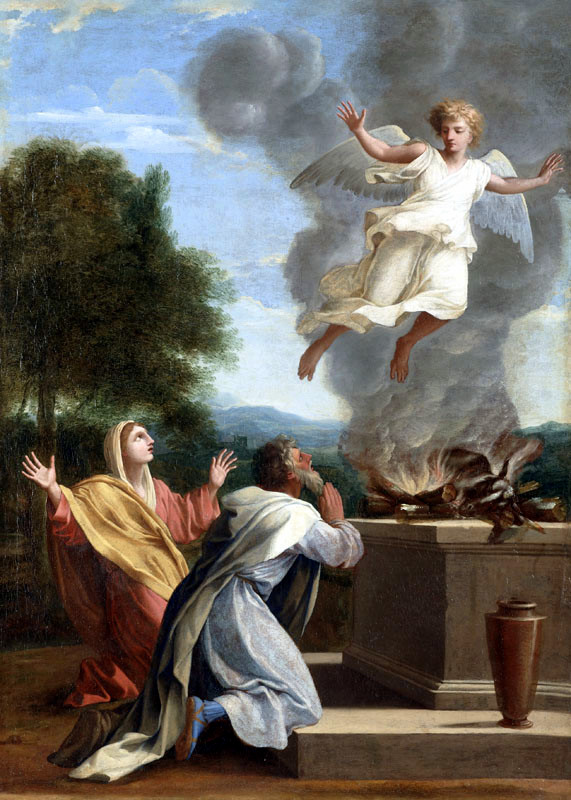
- Manoah and his barren wife sacrifice a ram to the angel of the Lord (above); Manoah's wife wears a wimple in Eustache Le Sueur's The Sacrifice of Manoah, 1640–1650.
- Born: Unknown; Zorah, Tribe of Dan, Ancient Israel
- Died: Unknown; Ancient Israel
- Known for: Father of Samson
- Spouse: Hazzelelponi or Zelelponith (according to tradition)
- Children: Samson, Nishyan or Nashyan (according to tradition)

Manoah (Hebrew: מָנ֫וֹחַ Mānoaḥ) is a figure from the Book of Judges 13:1-23 and 14:2-4 of the Hebrew Bible. His name means "rest". He is the father of the judge Samson.

== Family ==
According to the Bible, Manoah was of the tribe of Dan and lived in the city of Zorah. He married one woman, who was barren. Her name is not mentioned in the Bible, but according to tradition she was called Hazzelelponi or Zelelponith. She was a daughter of Etam and sister of Ishma.

Manoah and his wife were the parents of famous judge Samson. According to Rabbinic tradition, they also had a daughter called Nishyan or Nashyan.

== Birth of Samson ==
Manoah and his barren wife were childless, but the angel of the Lord appeared to Manoah's wife and told her that she would give birth to a son. The child was to be dedicated from the womb as a Nazirite, which entailed restrictions on his diet that the angel spelled out in detail. The woman, whose name is not mentioned in the Bible, told her husband, "A man of God came to me." Manoah prayed, and the angel returned to instruct the both of them. After the angel left, Manoah tells his wife, "We shall surely die, because we have seen God."

Together with his wife, Manoah subsequently tried to dissuade Samson from marrying a Philistine woman but traveled with him to Timnah for the wedding ceremony when they were unable to do so.

Samson's birth has special importance for some Christians (primarily Catholics) because of its similarity to the Annunciation to the Virgin Mary.

After Samson's death, his family recovers his body and buries him near the tomb of Manoah.

== In culture ==
- In John Milton's closet play Samson Agonistes, Manoah visits Samson after his imprisonment by the Philistines, and attempts to ransom them for his freedom.
- In the 1914 American film Samson, Manoah was played by George Periolat, while his wife was played by Lule Warrenton.
- In the 1949 film Samson and Delilah (starring Victor Mature and Hedy Lamarr), Manoah is played by Charles Evans in an uncredited appearance.
- In the 1984 film Samson and Delilah, Manoah is played by Victor Mature.
- In the 1996 film Samson and Delilah, Manoah, played by Paul Freeman, is shown as a poor old man. His wife is called Mara in this film.
- In the 2018 film Samson, Manoah is played by Rutger Hauer and his wife (called Zealphonis) is played by Lindsay Wagner.
