= Gizo, Israel =

Gizo: גיזו (Hebrew); جيزو (Arabic)
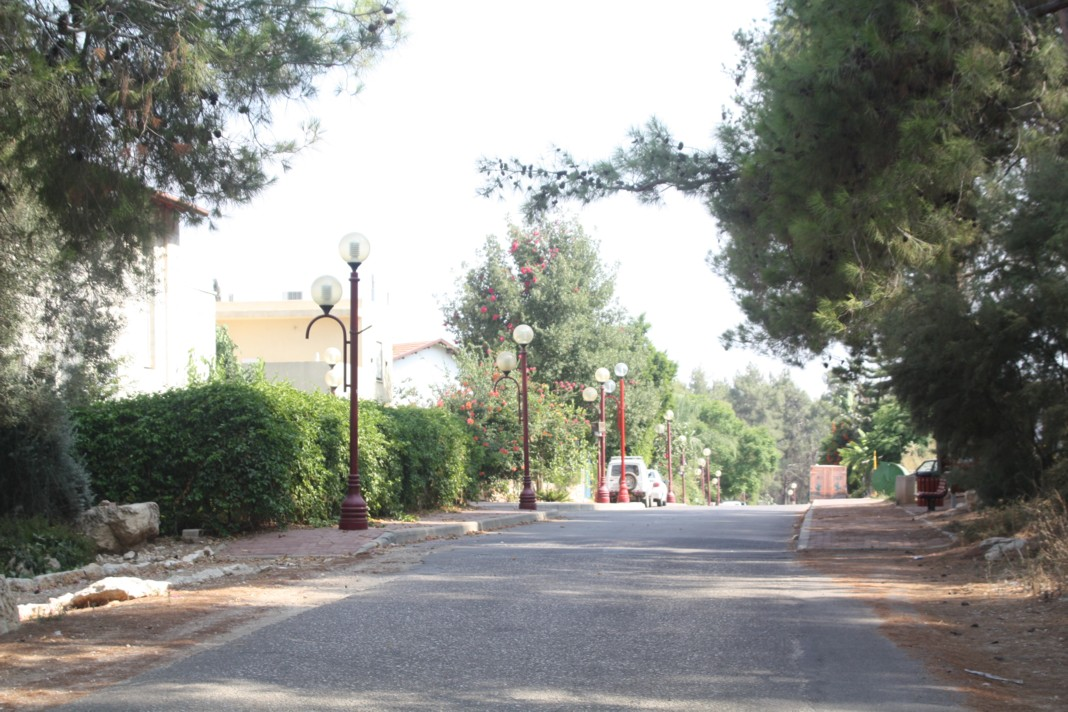

- Location within Jerusalem District
- Coordinates: 31°48′20″N 34°56′22″E
- Country: Israel
- District: Jerusalem
- Council: Mateh Yehuda
- Founded: 1960
- Founder: Jewish Agency
- Population (2024): 214

Gizo (Hebrew: גִּיזוֹ) is a community settlement in central Israel, northwest of Beit Shemesh, under the jurisdiction of the Mateh Yehuda Regional Council. In 2024 it had a population of 214.

== History ==
The village was established in 1960 by the Jewish Agency as a place of residence for teachers of the Gizo Regional Council school, and was named after the nearby biblical city of Gizo (1 Chronicles 11:34). It is on the former lands of the depopulated Palestinian village of Bayt Jiz, whose name also possibly referred to Gizo.
