= Angel of the Lord =

Entity in the Bible

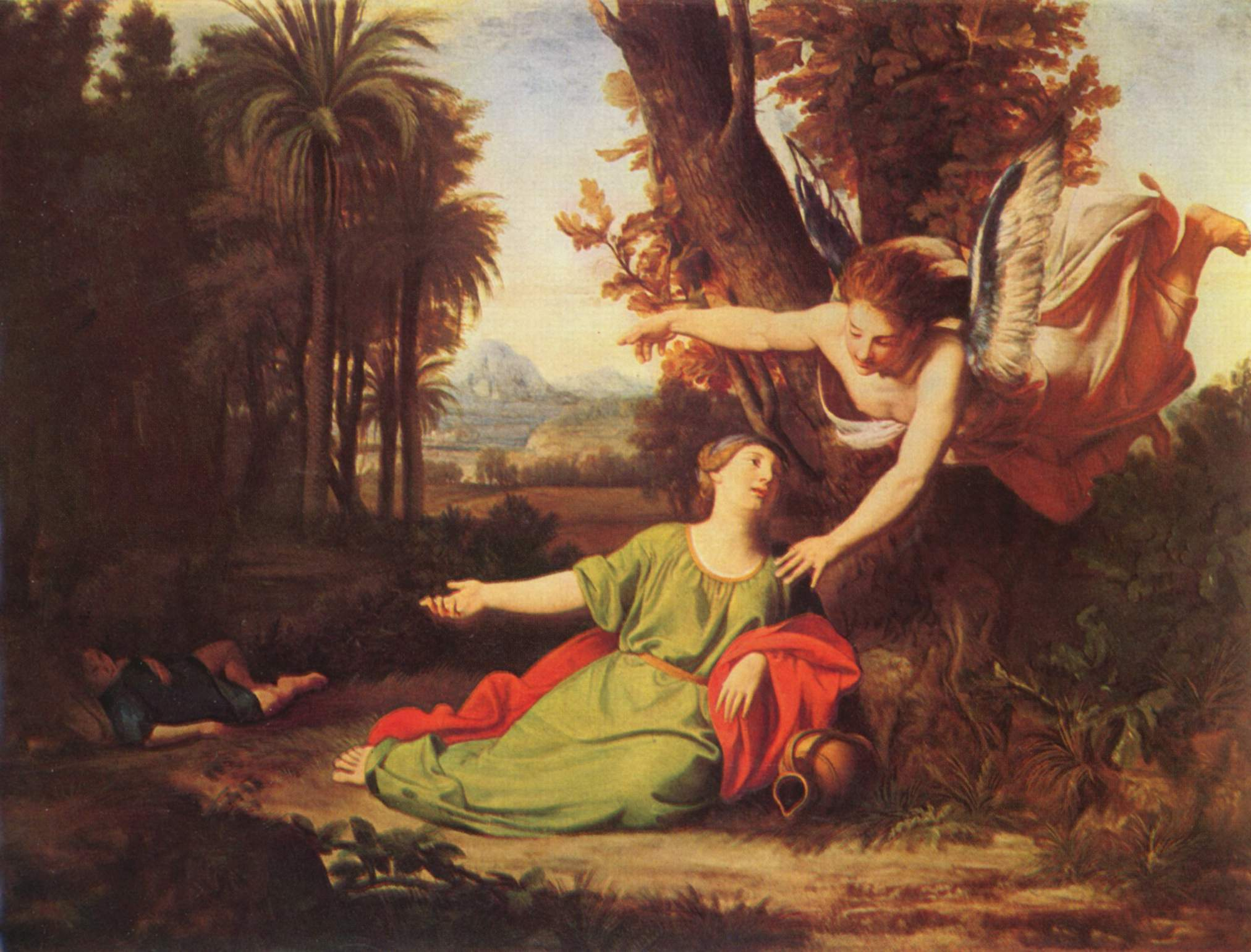
The Angel of the Lord appearing to Hagar in the wilderness, as depicted by Nicolas Colombel in the mid 17th century

The (or an) Angel of the Lord (Hebrew: מַלְאַךְ יְהוָה mal’āḵ YHWH "messenger of Yahweh") is an entity appearing repeatedly in the Tanakh on behalf of the God of Israel.

The term malakh YHWH, which occurs 65 times in the text of the Hebrew Bible, can be translated either as "the angel of the Lord" or "an angel of the Lord". The King James Version usually translates it as "the angel of the Lord"; less frequently as "an angel of the Lord". The Septuagint (LXX) sometimes uses ἄγγελος Κυρίου (an angel of the Lord), sometimes ὁ ἄγγελος Κυρίου (the angel of the Lord): in Genesis 16:7–11, it gives first the form without the Greek article, then, in all the subsequent mentions with the article, as in the anaphoric use of the article. (Note: The anaphoric article is the article denoting previous reference. The first mention of the substantive is usually anarthrous because it is merely being introduced. But subsequent mentions of it use the article, for the article is now pointing back to the substantive [referent, abstract idea referenced] previously mentioned" (The Berean Christian Bible Resources: Greek article and others).)

A closely related term is "angel of God" (mal'akh Elohim), mentioned 12 times (2 of which are plural). Another related expression, Angel of the Presence, occurs only once (Isaiah 63:9).

The New Testament uses the term "angel of the Lord" (ἄγγελος Κυρίου) several times. In one instance (Luke 1:11–19) the angel's name is Gabriel, although described as "an" angel of the Lord.

== Hebrew Bible ==
=== Angel of Yahweh ===
The word Angel found numerous times in the scriptures simply means 'messenger' and can either refer to a heavenly entity who delivers a message from God or a human messenger. There is a difference between an angel and the Angel of the Lord: the Angel of the Lord is the only angel appearing continually throughout the Old Testament referring to himself as the Lord and God in the first person, while the other angels mentioned in the scripture reference to the Lord God as a hallowed third person always humbling themselves and not accepting any type of glory.

Examples of use of the Hebrew term מַלְאַךְ יְהוָה are found in the following verses, here given in the King James Version translation:

- Genesis 16:7–14. The angel of the Lord appears to Hagar. The angel speaks as God himself in the first person, and in verse 13 Hagar identifies "the LORD that spoke to her" as "The God Who sees".
- Genesis 22:11–15. The angel of the Lord appears to Abraham and refers to himself as God in the first person.
- Exodus 3:2–4. The angel of the Lord appears to Moses in a flame in verse 2, and God speaks to Moses from the flame in verse 4, both instances referring to himself in the first person, the text seemingly conflates the two as one.
- Numbers 22:22–38. The angel of the Lord meets the prophet Balaam on the road. In verse 38, Balaam identifies the angel who spoke to him as delivering the word of God.
- Judges 2:1–3. The angel of the Lord appears to Israel.
- Judges 6:11–23. The angel of the Lord appears to Gideon, and in verse 22 Gideon fears for his life because he has seen the angel of the Lord face to face, which is similar to when others in the Tanakh (Old Testament) fear they will die because they have seen God.
- Judges 13:3–22. The angel of the Lord appears to Manoah and his wife and, in verse 16, tells them to offer to the LORD if they are to make an offering ("And the angel of the LORD said unto Manoah [...] if thou wilt offer a burnt offering, thou must offer it unto the LORD. For Manoah knew not that he was an angel of the LORD."). Later Manoah thought he and his wife will die for they "have seen God"
- Zechariah 1:12. The angel of the Lord pleads with the Lord to have mercy on Jerusalem and the cities of Judah.
- Zechariah 3:4. The angel of the Lord takes away the sin of the high priest Joshua.

The Greek translation of the Old Testament known as the Septuagint (Note: Modern critical editions of the Septuagint are based on the Codices Vaticanus, Sinaiticus, and Alexandrinus, the oldest complete texts now existing, while taking into account the few older fragments that have been discovered (see Septuagint manuscripts).) translates the Hebrew phrase מַלְאַךְ יְהוָה as ἄγγελος Κυρίου, "angel of the Lord" or as ὁ ἄγγελος Κυρίου, "the angel of the Lord". "Owing to the Hebrew idiom, this may mean no more than 'an angel of God', and the Septuagint renders it with or without the article at will."

The KJV and NKJV capitalize "Angel" in the Old Testament references to "the Angel of the Lord", while using lower-case "angel" in the Old Testament references to "an angel of the Lord" (and in the New Testament references). Most versions, including NASB, RSV, ESV, etc., do not capitalize "angel" in the mentions of "angel of the Lord".

=== Angel of Elohim ===
The term "angel of God" (Heb. mal'akh 'Elohim) occurs 12 times (2 of which are plural). The following are examples:

- Genesis 31:11. The angel of God calls out to Jacob in a dream and tells him "I am the God of Bethel".
- Exodus 14:19. The angel of God leads the camp of Israel, and also follows behind them, with the pillar of fire.
- Judges 13:9. The angel of God approached Manoah's wife after the Lord heard Manoah.

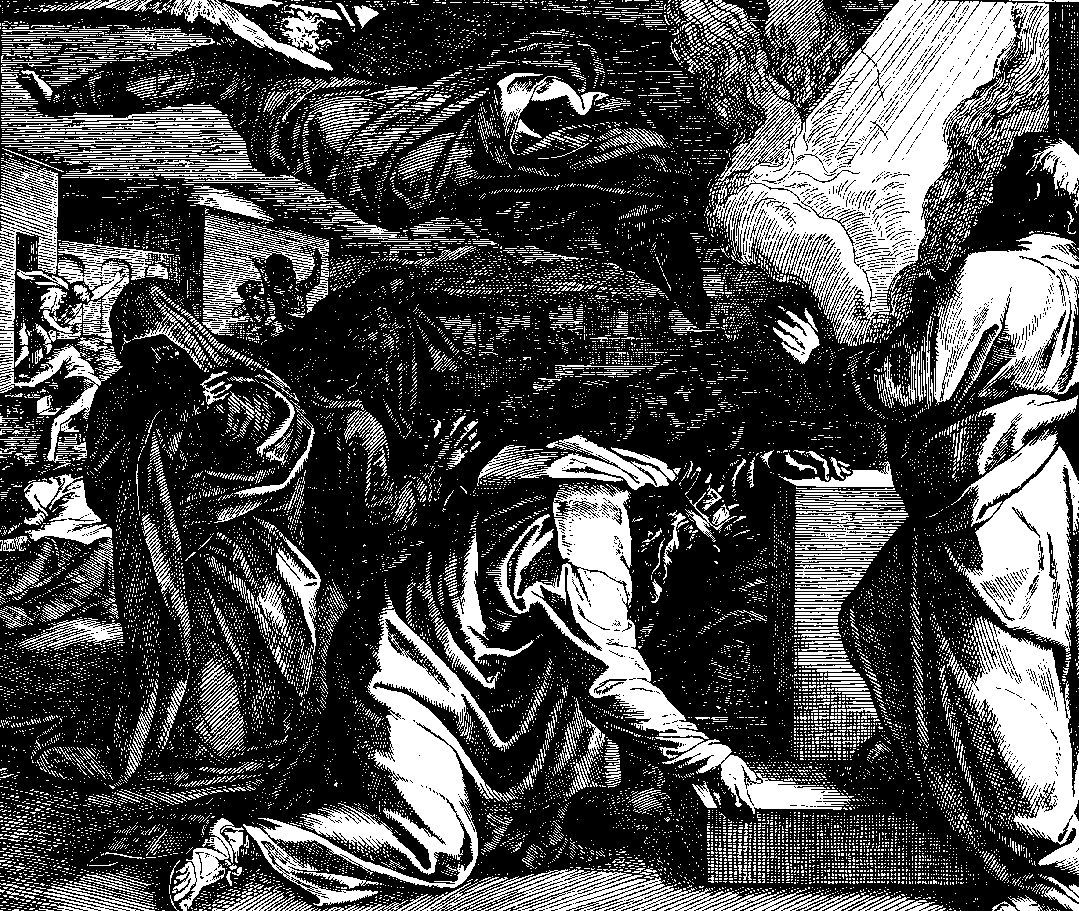
David is depicted interceding for the people to end the plague (1 Chronicles 21) in this 1860 woodcut by Julius Schnorr von Karolsfeld

=== Angel sent by God ===
In addition, there are mentions of God "sending an angel", of which the following are examples:

- Exodus 23:20–21. The LORD says he will send an Angel before the Israelites, and warns them to obey the Angel's voice, and that the Angel "will not pardon transgressions" because the LORD's "name is in him".
- Exodus 33:2. God says he will send an angel before the Israelites, and that God will drive out the Canaanites, Amorites, Hittites, Perizzites, the Hivites, and the Jebusites.
- Numbers 20:16. The LORD sent an angel and brought the people of Israel forth from Egypt.
- 1 Chronicles 21:15. God sent an angel to destroy Jerusalem, but then repented and told the angel to stay his hand.
- 2 Chronicles 32:21. The LORD sent an angel, which cut off all the mighty men of valour and the leaders and captains in the camp of the king of Assyria.

== New Testament ==
In the New Testament the Greek phrase ἄγγελος Κυρίου (angelos kuriou—"angel of the Lord") is found in Matthew 1:20, 1:24, 2:13, 2:19, 28:2; Luke 1:11, 2:9; John 5:4; Acts 5:19, 8:26, 12:7, and 12:23. English translations render the phrase either as "an angel of the Lord" or as "the angel of the Lord". The mentions in Acts 12:11 and Revelation 22:6 of "his angel" (the Lord's angel) can also be understood as referring either to the angel of the Lord or an angel of the Lord.

An angel of the Lord who is mentioned in Luke 1:11 makes himself and his identity known as Gabriel in Luke 1:19.

== Interpretations ==
Appearances of the "angel of the Lord" may leave the reader with the question of whether an angel or YHWH had appeared. Apart from the view that "the angel of the Lord is just that—an angel", there are a variety of interpretations, e.g. that the angel is an earthly manifestation of the God of Israel or of Jesus Christ.

The Hellenistic Jewish philosopher Philo (1st century AD) identified the angel of the Lord (singular) with Logos.

In the Catholic Encyclopedia (1907) Hugh Pope writes: "The earlier Fathers, going by the letter of the text in the Septuagint, maintained that it was God Himself who appeared as the Giver of the Law to Moses. It was not unnatural then for Tertullian [...] to regard such manifestations in the light of preludes to the Incarnation, and most of the Eastern Fathers followed the same line of thought." Pope quotes the view of Theodoret that the angel was probably Christ, "the Only-begotten Son, the Angel of great Counsel", and contrasts Theodoret's view with the view of the Latin Fathers Jerome, Augustine, and Gregory the Great that it was no more than an angel, a view that, he says, "was destined to live in the Church...". Pope quotes Saint Augustine, who declared that "the angel is correctly termed an angel if we consider him himself, but equally correctly is he termed 'the Lord' because God dwells in him." He indicates, however, that within the Catholic Church the opposite view was also upheld. Later scholars connected Augustine's declaration with the divine nature of Christ, stating that 'the Angel of the Lord is both an angel and the Lord, as Christ is both fully human and fully divine.'

Appearances of the "angel of the Lord" are often presented as theophanies, appearances of God himself, rather than a separate entity acting on his behalf. In Genesis 31:11–13, "the angel of God" says, "I am the God of Beth-el". In Exodus 3:2–6 "the angel of YHWH" (מלאך יהוה) appeared to Moses in the flame of fire, and then "YHWH" (יהוה) says to him: "I am the God of thy father". Compare also Genesis 22:11; Judges 6:11–22. At times the angel of the Lord speaks in such a way as to assume authority over previous promises (see Gen. 16:11 and 21:17). According to the New American Bible, the visual form under which God appeared and spoke to men is referred to in some Old Testament texts as God's angel and in other texts as God himself. This would be consistent with the usage of ancient spokesmen: After an introductory phrase, they used the grammatical first person point of view in stating the message of whomever they represented.

In the late 20th century, Messianic scholar Samuel A. Meier introduced an interpolation theory, suggesting that when there is ambiguity between YHWH and the "angel of YHWH", it is YHWH himself delivering the message. Later, copyists inserted the term mal’akh before the divine name to modify the narratives, in order to meet the standards of a changing theology which more strongly emphasized a transcendent God. If the term mal’akh is removed from these passages, the remaining story fits neatly with a "default" format in Near Eastern literature in which the deity appears directly to humans without an intermediary.

Daniel O. McClellan argues that the messenger's possession of YHWH's name, stated in Exodus 23:20–21, explains why passages can speak of the messenger as YHWH: by virtue of bearing the divine name, the messenger may be referred to by YHWH's own name and may exercise YHWH's own power and authority.

=== Possible Christophany ===
The early Church Fathers, such as Justin Martyr, identify the angel of the Lord as the pre-incarnate Christ whose appearance, i.e. Christophany, is recorded in the Hebrew Bible. On the reason why some early Christians viewed Jesus as the angel of the Lord, Susan Garrett says,

Some [Jews during the time of Jesus and shortly before] understood the angel of the Lord as a being completely separate from God—a sort of angelic vizier or righthand angel, who served as head of the heavenly host and... as a mediator between God and humans... [Apart] from Christianity there was talk among ancient Jews of God’s word, God’s glory, and so forth in terms highly reminiscent of the angel of the Lord. So, when early Christian authors like Justin Martyr connected Jesus with God’s word and that word, in turn, with the angel of the Lord, they were not inventing from scratch...

In the time of the early Church, "an essential ingredient of anti-Jewish polemics" was identification of the Angel of the Lord as Jesus Christ.

In the 17th century, Matthew Henry refers to 1 Corinthians 10:9, where the Israelites are said to have tempted Christ in the desert, as evidence that the angel of God is Christ.

In Baker's Evangelical Dictionary of Biblical Theology, Louis Goldberg writes: "The functions of the angel of the Lord in the Old Testament prefigure the reconciling ministry of Jesus. In the New Testament, there is no mention of the angel of the Lord; the Messiah himself is this person." In contrast, Knofel Staton says: "The idea that this angel was Christ is unlikely for many reasons, which include the following: 1) God never said to any angel (including the 'angel of the Lord') 'you are my son' (Heb 1:5) ...". Similarly, Ben Witherington says: "The angel of the Lord is just that – an angel. [... T]he divine son of God [...] was no mere angel of the Lord, nor did he manifest himself in some observable form prior to the Incarnation."

Jehovah's Witnesses teach that the angel who brought the Israelites into their promised land (and would not pardon transgression because God's name was in him Exodus 23:20–21) was "God's firstborn Son". They sometimes refer to the pre-existent Christ as the archangel Michael. In this way, they link the prince of the people of Israel mentioned in Daniel 10:21 to the firstborn called "the Son of God" because he was created with qualities like those of his Father.

== See also ==
- Archangel
- Bene Elohim
- List of angels in theology
- Metatron
- Yahoel
