= Tzelafon =

Moshav in Jerusalem District, Israel

Tzelafon: צְלָפוֹן (Hebrew)
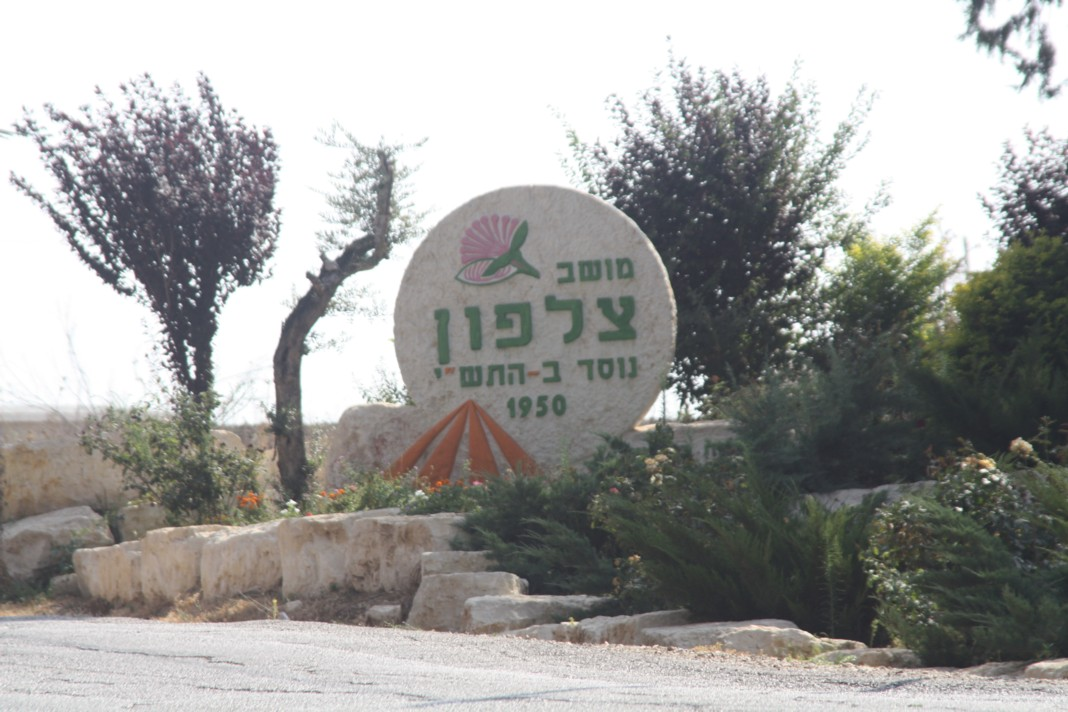
- Village entrance

- Location within Jerusalem District Location within Israel
- Coordinates: 31°48′13″N 34°55′58″E
- Country: Israel
- District: Jerusalem
- Council: Mateh Yehuda
- Affiliation: Moshavim Movement
- Founded: 1950
- Founder: Yemenite Jews
- Population (2024): 1,115

Tzelafon (Hebrew: צְלָפוֹן) is a moshav in central Israel. Located to the north of Beit Shemesh, it falls under the jurisdiction of Mateh Yehuda Regional Council. In 2024 it had a population of 1,115.

== History ==
The village was established in 1950 by immigrants from Yemen. They were later joined by more immigrants from Morocco, who arrived in Israel in 1955. It was possibly named after the ancient city of Tzelafon (which was located in the area and named after Zelelponith) or for the capparis (Hebrew: Tzalaf) bushes in the area.
