= Manoah's wife =

Figure in the Book of Judges

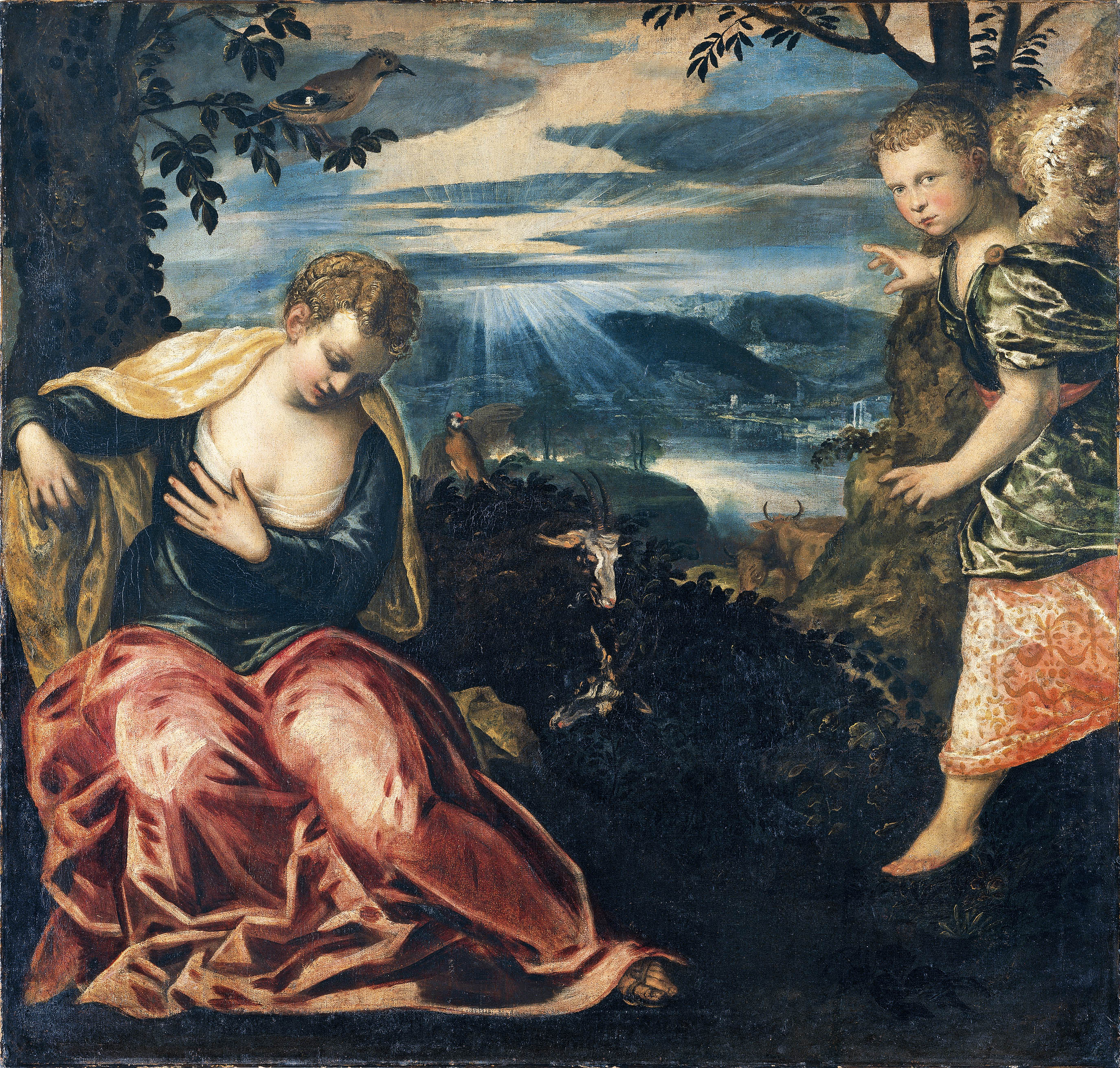
The Annunciation to Manoah's Wife by Tintoretto.

Manoah's wife (also referred to as Samson's mother) is an unnamed figure in the Book of Judges, the wife of Manoah. She is introduced in Judges 13:2 as a barren woman. The angel of the Lord appears to her and tells her she will have a son. She later gives birth to Samson.

J. Cheryl Exum argues that Manoah's wife is more perceptive than her husband, in that she "senses at once something otherworldly" about the man of God who visits her, and "recognizes a divine purpose behind the revelation." Bruce Waltke regards her as cynical, noting that, unlike Hannah, she neither prays for a child nor praises God afterwards.

Ancient Rabbinic tradition identifies this woman as the Hazzelelponi mentioned in 1 Chronicles 4:3, and the Talmud gives her a variant of this name, Tzelelponit (Hebrew: צללפונית).

In Cecil B. DeMille's 1949 biblical film, Samson and Delilah, Manoah's wife was rendered as "Hazelelponit".

== See also ==
- List of names for the biblical nameless
