= Naso (parashah) =

Torah reading

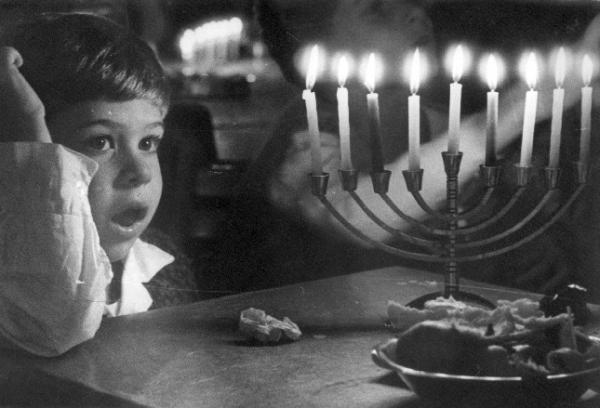
Hanukkah menorah

Naso or Nasso (נָשֹׂא—Hebrew for "take a census" or "lift up," the sixth word, and the first distinctive word, in the parashah) is the 35th weekly Torah portion (פָּרָשָׁה, parashah) in the annual Jewish cycle of Torah reading and the second in the Book of Numbers. It constitutes Numbers 4:21–7:89. The parashah addresses priestly duties, camp purification, restitution for wrongs committed, the wife accused of unfaithfulness (סוטה, sotah), the nazirite, the Priestly Blessing, and consecration of the Tabernacle. Naso has the largest number of letters, words, and verses of any of the 54 weekly Torah portions. The parashah is made up of 8,632 Hebrew letters, 2,264 Hebrew words, 176 verses, and 311 lines in a Torah Scroll.

Jews generally read it in late May or June, typically (though not always) on the first Sabbath after Shavuot. As this parashah includes the story of the consecration of the Tabernacle, Jews also read parts of it as Torah readings on the eight days of Hanukkah, when they commemorate the reconsecration of the Temple in Jerusalem. Numbers 7:1–17 is the Torah reading for the first day of Hanukkah; Numbers 7:18–29 is the Torah reading for the second day; Numbers 7:24–35 is the Torah reading for the third day; Numbers 7:30–41 is the Torah reading for the fourth day; Numbers 7:36–47 is the Torah reading for the fifth day; Numbers 7:42–47 is the second Torah reading for the sixth day (which, because it falls on Rosh Chodesh, has Numbers 28:1–15 as its first reading); Numbers 7:48–59 is the Torah reading for the seventh day when it does not fall on Rosh Chodesh; and Numbers 7:48–53 is the second Torah reading for the seventh day when it does fall on Rosh Chodesh (in which case Numbers 28:1–15 is the first reading); and Numbers 7:54–8:4 is the Torah reading for the eighth day. When a day of Hanukkah falls on a Sabbath, however, the regular weekly Torah reading for that Sabbath is the first Torah reading for that day, and the following readings from Parashat Naso are the maftir Torah readings: Numbers 7:1–17 is the maftir Torah reading for the first day of Hanukkah; Numbers 7:18–23 is the maftir Torah reading for the second day; Numbers 7:24–29 is the maftir Torah reading for the third day; Numbers 7:30–35 is the maftir Torah reading for the fourth day; Numbers 7:36–41 is the maftir Torah reading for the fifth day; Numbers 7:42–47 is the maftir Torah reading for the sixth day (which, because it falls on Rosh Chodesh, has Numbers 28:9–15 as its sixth reading); Numbers 7:48–53 is the maftir Torah reading for the seventh day; and Numbers 7:54–8:4 is the maftir Torah reading for the eighth day.

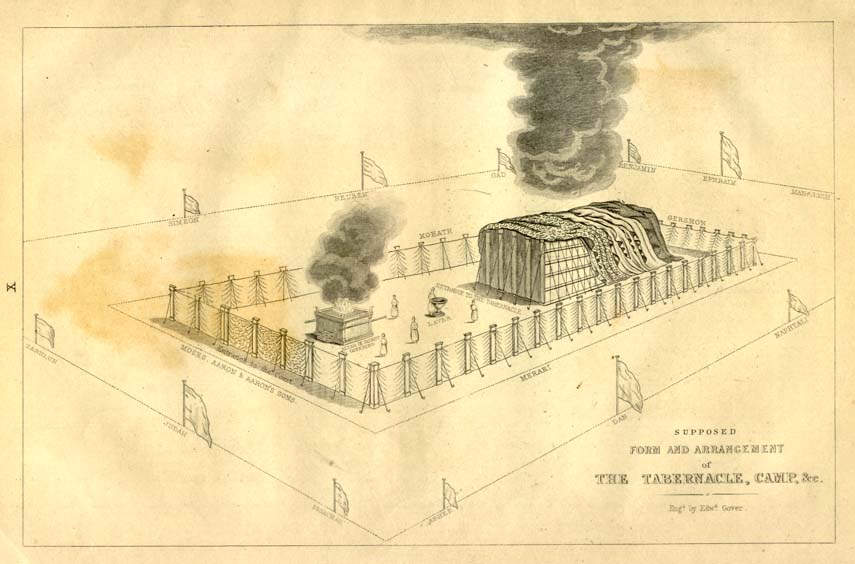
The Tabernacle and the Camp

== Readings ==
In traditional Sabbath Torah reading, the parashah is divided into seven readings, or עליות, aliyot.

=== First reading—Numbers 4:21–37 ===
In the first reading, God told Moses to take a census of the Gershonites between 30 and 50 years old, who were subject to service for the Tabernacle. The Gershonites had the duty, under the direction of Aaron's son Ithamar, to carry the cloths of the Tabernacle, the Tent of Meeting with its covering, the covering of tachash skin on top of it, the screen for the entrance of the Tent of Meeting, the hangings of the enclosure, the screen at the entrance of the gate of the enclosure surrounding the Tabernacle, the cords thereof, the altar, and all their service equipment and accessories. Moses was also to take a census of the Merarites between 30 and 50 years old. The Merarites had responsibility, under the direction of Ithamar, for the planks, the bars, the posts, and the sockets of the Tabernacle, and the posts around the enclosure and their sockets, pegs, and cords. Moses, Aaron, and the chieftains recorded 2,750 Kohathites age 30 to 50.

Relative Population and Adult Population of the Levite Divisions(from Numbers 3:22–34 and 4:34–39)
Division	Population	Share of Total	Rank by Pop.	Adults	Share of Total	Rank by Adults	Adult Share of Division
Kohathites	8,600	38.6	1	2,750	32.1	2	32.0
Gershonites	7,500	33.6	2	2,630	30.6	3	35.1
Merarites	6,200	27.8	3	3,200	37.3	1	51.6
Total	22,300	100.0		8,580	100.0		38.5

=== Second reading—Numbers 4:38–49 ===
In the second reading, Moses, Aaron, and the chieftains recorded the Levites age 30 to 50 as follows:

- Kohathites: 2,750,
- Gershonites: 2,630, and
- Merarites: 3,200,

making a total of 8,580 undertaking the work of service and the work of bearing burdens.

=== Third reading—Numbers 5:1–10 ===
In the third reading, God directed the Israelites to remove from camp anyone with an eruption or a discharge and anyone defiled by a corpse, so that they would not defile the camp. God told Moses to direct the Israelites that when they wronged fellow Israelites, thus breaking faith with God, and realized their guilt, they were to confess the wrong and make restitution to those wronged in the principal amount plus one-fifth. If the one wronged had died, it was implied that restitution was to be made to a kinsman, and if there was no kinsman to whom restitution could be made, the amount repaid was to go to the priest, along (in any case) with a ram of expiation.

Similarly, any gift among the sacred donations that the Israelites offered was to be the priest's to keep.

=== Fourth reading—Numbers 5:11–6:27 ===
In the fourth reading, God told Moses to instruct the Israelites about the test where a husband, in a fit of jealousy, accused his wife of being unfaithful—the ordeal of the bitter water. The man was to bring his wife to the priest, along with barley flour as a meal offering of jealousy. The priest was to dissolve some earth from the floor of the Tabernacle into some sacral water in an earthen vessel. The priest was to bare the woman's head, place the meal offering on her hands, and adjure the woman: if innocent, to be immune to harm from the water of bitterness, but if guilty, to be cursed to have her thigh sag and belly distend. The woman was to say, "Amen, amen!" The priest was to write these curses down, rub the writing into the water of bitterness, and make the woman drink it. The priest was to elevate the meal offering, present it on the altar, and burn a token part of it on the altar. If she had broken faith with her husband, the water would cause her belly to distend and her thigh to sag, and the woman was to become a curse among her people, but if the woman was innocent, she would remain unharmed and be able to bear children.

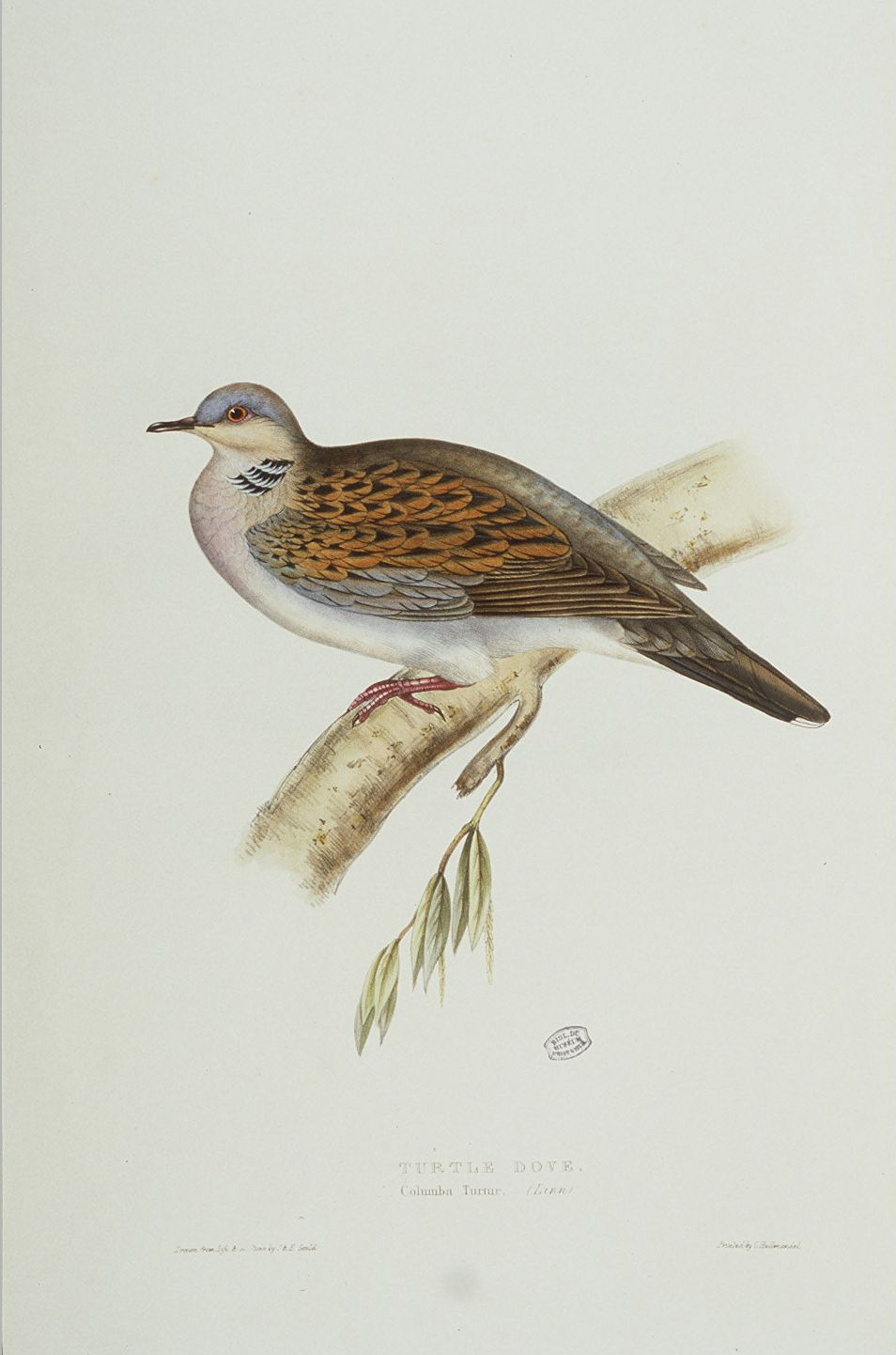
Turtledove (illustration circa 1832–1837 by John and Elizabeth Gould)

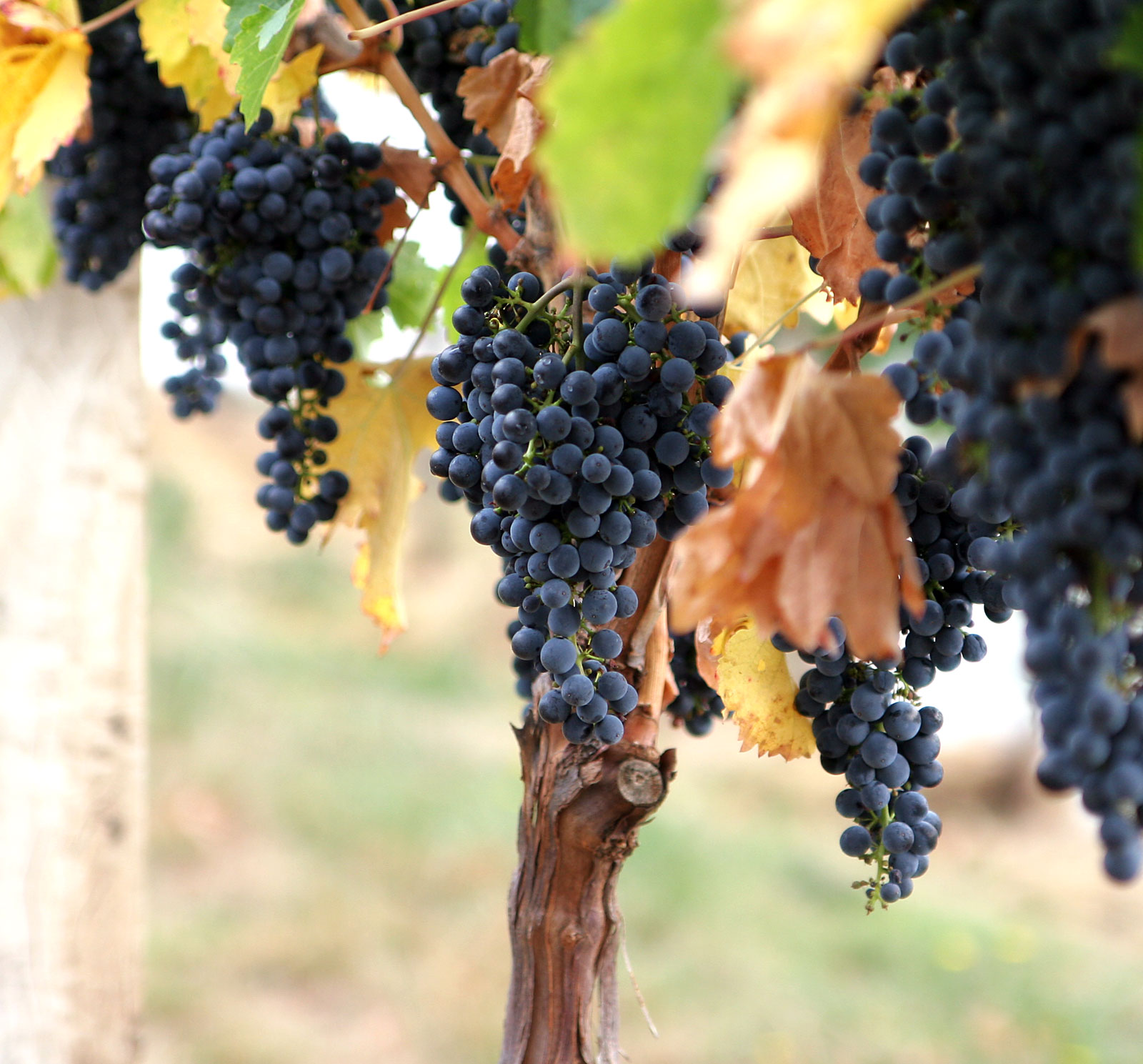
Grapes, forbidden to the nazirite

In the continuation of the fourth reading, God told Moses to instruct the Israelites about the vows of a nazirite (נָזִיר nāzīr) who wishes to set themselves apart for God. The nazirite was to abstain from wine, intoxicants, vinegar, grapes, raisins, or anything obtained from the grapevine. No razor was to touch the nazirite's head until the completion of the nazirite term. The nazirite was not to go near a corpse, even a father, mother, brother, or sister. If a person died suddenly near a nazirite, the nazirite was to shave his or her head on the seventh day. On the eighth day, the nazirite was to bring two turtledoves or two pigeons to the priest, who was to offer one as a sin offering and the other as a burnt offering. That same day, the nazirite was to reconsecrate his or her head, rededicate the nazirite term, and bring a lamb in its first year as a penalty offering. On the day that a nazirite completed his or her term, the nazirite was to be brought to the entrance of the Tent of Meeting and present a male lamb in its first year for a burnt offering, a ewe lamb in its first year for a sin offering, a ram for an offering of well-being, a basket of unleavened cakes, unleavened wafers spread with oil, and meal offerings. The priest was to present the offerings, and the nazirite was to shave his or her consecrated hair and put the hair on the fire under the sacrifice of well-being.

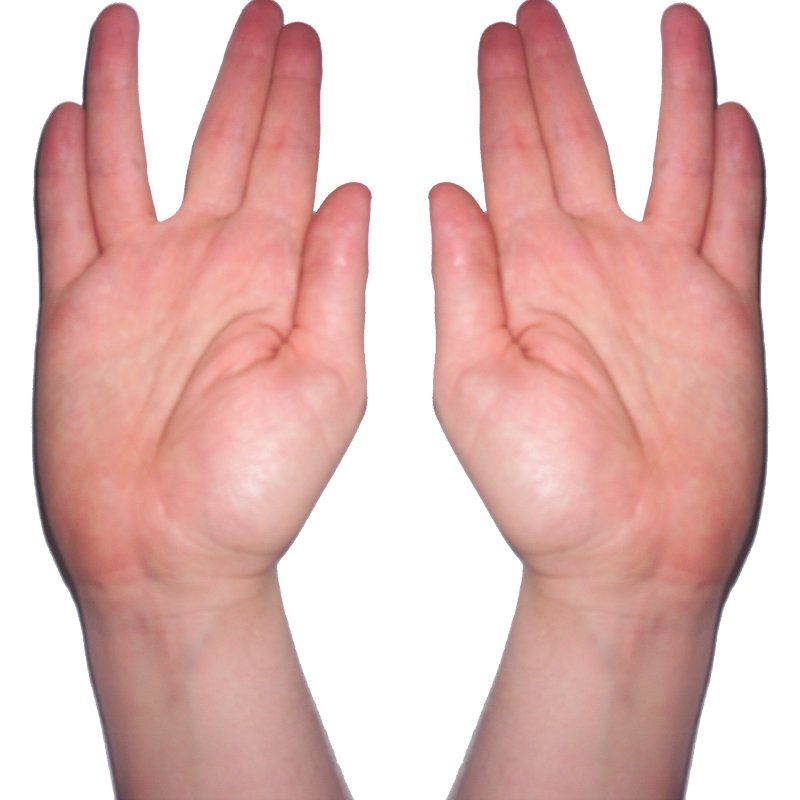
The positioning of the fingers of the kohen during the Priestly Blessing

In the conclusion of the fourth reading, God told Moses to instruct Aaron and his sons that they should bless the Israelites, which is known as the Priestly Blessing: "The Lord bless you and protect you! The Lord deal kindly and graciously with you! The Lord bestow His favor upon you and grant you peace!"

=== Fifth reading—Numbers 7:1–41 ===
In the fifth reading, Moses finished setting up the Tabernacle, and anointed and consecrated it, its furnishings, the altar, and its utensils. The chieftains of the tribes then brought their offerings—6 carts and 12 oxen—and God told Moses to accept them for use by the Levites in the service of the Tent of Meeting. He allocated two carts and four oxen to the Gershonites and the remaining four carts and eight oxen to the Merarites. None were allocated to the Kohathites, 'because the sacred objects they took care of had to be carried on their shoulders'.

The chieftains then each on successive days brought the same dedication offerings for the altar: a silver bowl and silver basin filled with flour mixed with oil, a gold ladle filled with incense, a bull, 2 oxen, 5 rams, 5 goats, and 5 lambs.

=== Sixth reading—Numbers 7:42–71 ===
In the sixth reading, the chieftains continued to bring dedication offerings for the altar.

=== Seventh reading—Numbers 7:72–89 ===
In the seventh reading, the chieftains from the remaining tribes bought their dedication offerings for the altar. When Moses went into the Tent of Meeting to speak with God, Moses would hear the Voice addressing him from above the cover that was on top of the Ark between the two cherubim, and thus God spoke to him.

=== Readings according to the triennial cycle ===
Jews who read the Torah according to the triennial cycle of Torah reading read the parashah according to the following schedule:

	Year 1	Year 2	Year 3
	2023, 2026, 2029 ...	2024, 2027, 2030 ...	2025, 2028, 2031 ...
Reading	4:21–5:10	5:11–6:27	7:1–89
1	4:21–24	5:11–15	7:1–11
2	4:25–28	5:16–26	7:12–23
3	4:29–33	5:27–6:4	7:24–35
4	4:34–37	6:5–8	7:36–47
5	4:38–49	6:9–15	7:48–59
6	5:1–4	6:16–21	7:60–71
7	5:5–10	6:22–27	7:72–89
Maftir	5:8–10	6:22–27	7:87–89

== In inner-Biblical interpretation ==
The parashah has parallels or is discussed in these Biblical sources:

=== Numbers chapter 4 ===
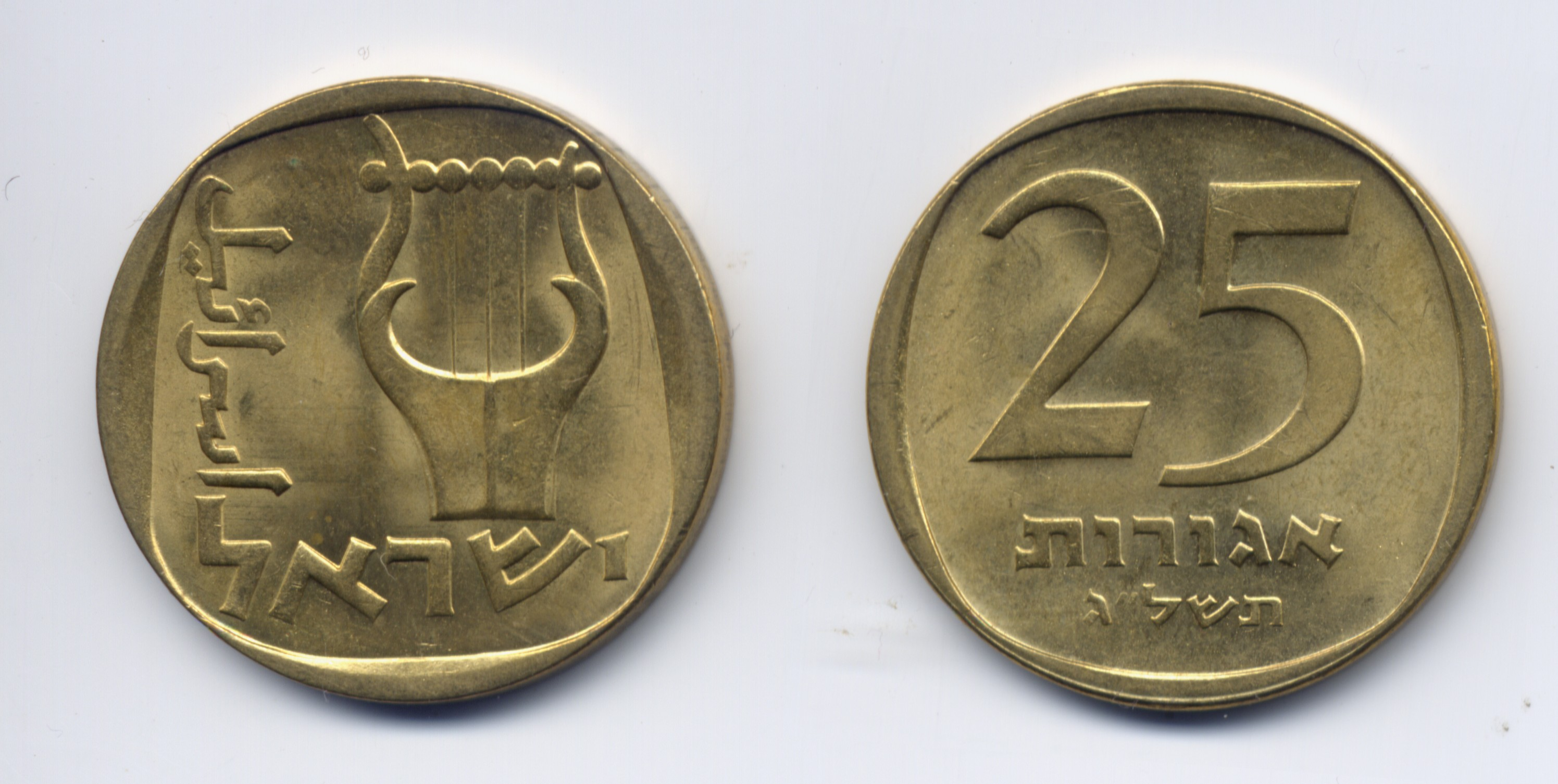
A lyre on an Israeli coin

Numbers 4:21–33 refers to duties of the Levites. Deuteronomy 33:10 reports that Levites taught the law. Deuteronomy 17:9–10 reports that they served as judges. And Deuteronomy 10:8 reports that they blessed God's name. 1 Chronicles 23:3–5 reports that of 38,000 Levite men aged 30 and up, 24,000 were in charge of the work of the Temple in Jerusalem, 6,000 were officers and magistrates, 4,000 were gatekeepers, and 4,000 praised God with instruments and song. 1 Chronicles 15:16 reports that King David installed Levites as singers with musical instruments, harps, lyres, and cymbals, and 1 Chronicles 16:4 reports that David appointed Levites to minister before the Ark, to invoke, to praise, and to extol God. And 2 Chronicles 5:12 reports at the inauguration of Solomon's Temple, Levites sang dressed in fine linen, holding cymbals, harps, and lyres, to the east of the altar, and with them 120 priests blew trumpets. 2 Chronicles 20:19 reports that Levites of the sons of Kohath and of the sons of Korah extolled God in song. Eleven Psalms identify themselves as of the Korahites.

=== Numbers chapter 5 ===
==== Corpse contamination ====
In Numbers 5:1–4, God instructed Moses to command the Israelites to put out of the camp every person defiled by contact with the dead, so that they would not defile their camps, amid which God dwelt. This is one of a series of passages setting out the teaching that contact with the dead is antithetical to purity.

In Leviticus 21:1–5, God instructed Moses to direct the priests not to allow themselves to become defiled by contact with the dead, except for a mother, father, son, daughter, brother, or unmarried sister. And the priests were not to engage in mourning rituals of making baldness upon their heads, shaving off the corners of their beards, or cutting their flesh.

Numbers 19 sets out a procedure for a red heifer mixture for decontamination from corpse contamination.

In its profession associated with tithing, Deuteronomy 26:13–14 instructed Israelites to aver that they had not eaten from the tithe in mourning, nor put away any of it while unclean, nor given any of it to the dead.

In Ezekiel 43:6–9, the prophet Ezekiel cites the burial of kings within the Temple as one of the practices that defiled the Temple and cause God to abandon it.

Numbers 5:1–4 and 6:6–7 associate death with uncleanness, as do Leviticus 11:8, 11; 21:1–4, 11; and Numbers 19:11–16. Perhaps similarly, Leviticus 12 associates uncleanness with childbirth and Leviticus 13–14 associates it with skin disease. Leviticus 15 associates it with various sexuality-related events. And Jeremiah 2:7, 23; 3:2; and 7:30; and Hosea 6:10 associate it with contact with the worship of alien gods.

==== Repentance for false swearing ====
The Rabbis read Numbers 5:6–8 together with Leviticus 5:21–26 as related passages. Leviticus 5:21–26 deals with those who sin and commit a trespass against God by dealing falsely with their neighbors in the matter of a deposit, pledge, theft, other oppression of their neighbors, or the finding of lost property, and swear to a lie. Leviticus 5:23–24 provides that the offender must immediately restore in full to the victim the property at issue and shall add an additional fifth part. And Leviticus 5:25–26 requires the offender to bring to the priest an unblemished ram for a guilt-offering, and the priest shall make atonement for the offender before God, and the offender shall be forgiven.

Numbers 5:6–7 directs that when people commit any sin against God, then they shall confess and make restitution in full to the victim and add a fifth part. And Numbers 5:8 provides that if the victim has no heir to whom restitution may be made, the offender must make restitution to the priest, in addition to the ram of atonement.

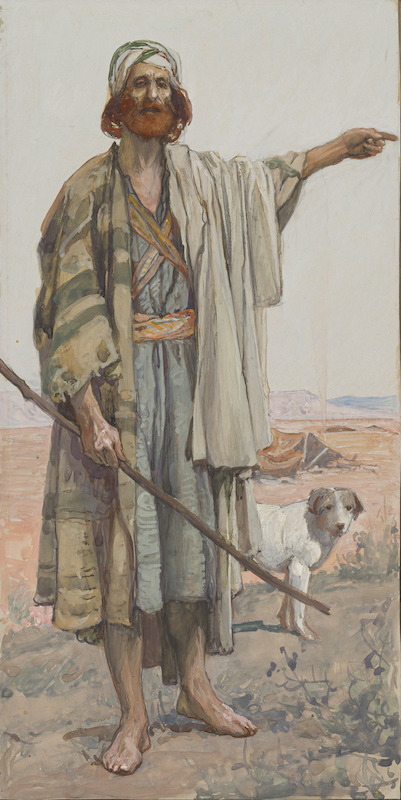
Amos (watercolor circa 1896–1902 by James Tissot)

==== The Sotah ====
Amy Kalmanofsky suggested that the closest analogue to the ritual for the suspected wife in Numbers 5:11–31 is the ritual in Deuteronomy 21:1–9 in response to an unsolved murder, as both rituals addressed cases where the community faced the possibility of a capital crime without the evidence necessary to determine guilt or innocence.

Kalmanofsky noted that the verbal root s-t-h (שטה), translated in this passage as "gone astray," appears four times here—in Numbers 5:12 (תִשְׂטֶה, tisteh), 5:19 (שָׂטִית, satit), 5:20 (שָׂטִית, satit), and 5:29 (תִשְׂטֶה, tisteh)—but only twice more in the rest of the Hebrew Bible, when Proverbs 4:15 (שְׂטֵה, seteh, "turn away") and 7:25 (יֵשְׂטְ, yest, “wander”) warn young men to resist the seductions of dangerous women.

=== Numbers chapter 6 ===
==== The Nazirite ====
Numbers 6:1–21 gives the laws of the nazirite. Judges 13:2–24 tells how an angel directed Manoah and his wife that their then-unborn son Samson would be a nazirite. And 1 Samuel 1:1–11 tells how Hannah pledged her then-unborn son Samuel to be a nazirite.

The prophet Amos compared nazirites to prophets, teaching that God raised up both. And Amos chastised Israel for inducing nazirites to drink wine.

==== The Priestly Blessing ====
The Priestly Blessing of Numbers 6:24–26 is echoed in the entreaty of Psalm 4:7, "Lift up the light of Your countenance upon us."

=== Numbers chapter 7 ===
According to Exodus 40:17, "In the first month of the second year, on the first of the month, the Tabernacle was set up." Numbers 7:1 then reports, "On the day that Moses finished setting up the Tabernacle", the chieftains of the tribes began bringing their offerings and would continue for 12 days. At the same time, the ordination events of Leviticus 8 took place. "On the eighth day," the inaugural offerings of Leviticus 9 took place, followed by the incident of Nadab and Abihu in Leviticus 10. Numbers 9:5 then reports that "on the fourteenth day of the month", the Israelites offered the Passover sacrifice. Numbers 1:1 and the section on the census begins, "On the first day of the second month, in the second year following the exodus from the land of Egypt." And Numbers 9:11 then reports that the second Passover for those unable to participate in the first Passover would commence "in the second month, on the fourteenth day of the month." Thus, the events beginning with Numbers 7:1 would have taken place in the month before those of Numbers 1:1 and the section on the census.

Numbers 7:87 orders the sacrifice of twelve male goats for a sin offering. At the restoration and dedication of the temple after the return from exile, the same number of goats was offered for the sins of the twelve tribes.

== In classical rabbinic interpretation ==
The parashah is discussed in these rabbinic sources from the era of the Mishnah and the Talmud:

=== Numbers chapter 4 ===
A midrash noted that God ordered the Kohathites counted first in Numbers 4:1 and only thereafter ordered the Gershonites counted in Numbers 4:21, even though Gershon was the firstborn and Scripture generally honors the firstborn. The midrash taught that Scripture gives Kohath precedence over Gershon because the Kohathites bore the Ark that carried the Torah. Similarly, another midrash taught that God ordered the Kohathites counted first because Kohath was most holy, for Aaron the priest—who was most holy—descended from Kohath, while Gershon was only holy. But the midrash taught that Gershon did not forfeit his status as firstborn, because Scripture uses the same language, "Lift up the head of the sons of," with regard to Kohath in Numbers 4:2 and with regard to Gershon in Numbers 4:22. And Numbers 4:22 says "they also" with regard to the Gershonites so that one should not suppose that the Gershonites were numbered second because they were inferior to the Kohathites; rather Numbers 4:22 says "they also" to indicate that the Gershonites were also like the Kohathites in every respect, and the Kohathites were placed first in this connection as a mark of respect to the Torah. In other places; however, Scripture places Gershon before Kohath.

Levi
Gershon	Kohath	Merari	Jochebed
Amram	Izhar	Hebron	Uzziel
Miriam	Aaron	Moses

A midrash taught that had Reuben not disgraced himself by his conduct with Bilhah in Genesis 35:22, his descendants would have been worthy of assuming the service of the Levites, for ordinary Levites came to replace firstborn Israelites, as Numbers 3:41 says, "And you shall take the Levites for Me, even the Lord, instead of all the firstborn among the children of Israel."

A midrash noted that in Numbers 4:1, "the Lord spoke to Moses and Aaron" to direct them to count the Kohathites and in Numbers 4:21 "the Lord spoke to Moses" to direct him to count the Gershonites, but Numbers 4:29 does not report that "the Lord spoke" to direct them to count the Merarites. The midrash deduced that Numbers 4:21 employed the words "the Lord spoke" to give honor to Gershon as the firstborn, and to give him the same status as Kohath. The midrash then noted that Numbers 4:1 reported that God spoke "to Aaron" about the Kohathites but Numbers 4:21 did not report communication to Aaron about the Gershonites. The midrash taught that God excluded Aaron from all Divine communications to Moses and that passages that mention Aaron do not report that God spoke to Aaron but include Aaron's name in sections that concern Aaron to indicate that God spoke to Moses so that he might repeat what he heard to Aaron. Thus Numbers 4:1 mentions Aaron regarding the Kohathites because Aaron and his sons assigned the Kohathites their duties, since (as Numbers 4:15 relates) the Kohathites were not permitted to touch the ark or any of the vessels until Aaron and his sons had covered them. In the case of the Gershonites, however, the midrash finds no evidence that Aaron personally interfered with them, as Ithamar supervised their tasks, and thus Numbers 4:21 does not mention Aaron in connection with the Gershonites.

A midrash noted that in Numbers 4:2 and 4:22, God used the expression "lift up the head" to direct counting the Kohathites and Gershonites, but in Numbers 4:29, God does not use that expression to direct counting the Merarites. The midrash deduced that God honored the Kohathites on account of the honor of the Ark and the Gershonites because Gershon was a firstborn. But since the Merarites neither cared for the Ark nor descended from a firstborn, God did not use the expression "lift up the head."

A midrash noted that in Numbers 4:2 and 4:29, for the Kohathites and the Merarites, the sequence is "by their families, by their fathers' houses," whereas in Numbers 4:22, for the Gershonites, "their fathers' houses" precedes "their families." The midrash deduced that this is so because the importance of the Gershonites comes from their fathers' house, as Gershon was the firstborn.

The Tosefta noted that Numbers 4:3, 23, 30, 35, 39, 43, and 47 say that Levites "30 years old and upward" did service in the tent of meeting, while Numbers 8:24 says, "from 25 years old and upward they shall go in to perform the service in the work of the tent of meeting." The Tosefta deduced that the difference teaches that all those five years, from the age of 25 to the age of 30, Levites studied, serving apprenticeships, and from that time onward they were allowed to draw near to do service. The Tosefta concluded that a Levite could not enter the Temple courtyard to do service unless he had served an apprenticeship of five years. And the Tosefta inferred from this that students who see no sign of success in their studies within a period of five years will never see any. Rabbi Jose said that students had to see success within three years, basing his position on the words "that they should be nourished three years" in Daniel 1:5.

A midrash taught that the words of Numbers 4:23, "All who enter in to wait upon the service," refer to those who were gatekeepers (whose job was to guard the Temple and not to perform active service). And the midrash taught that the words of Numbers 4:23, "To do service in the tent of meeting," refer to those who were the singers.

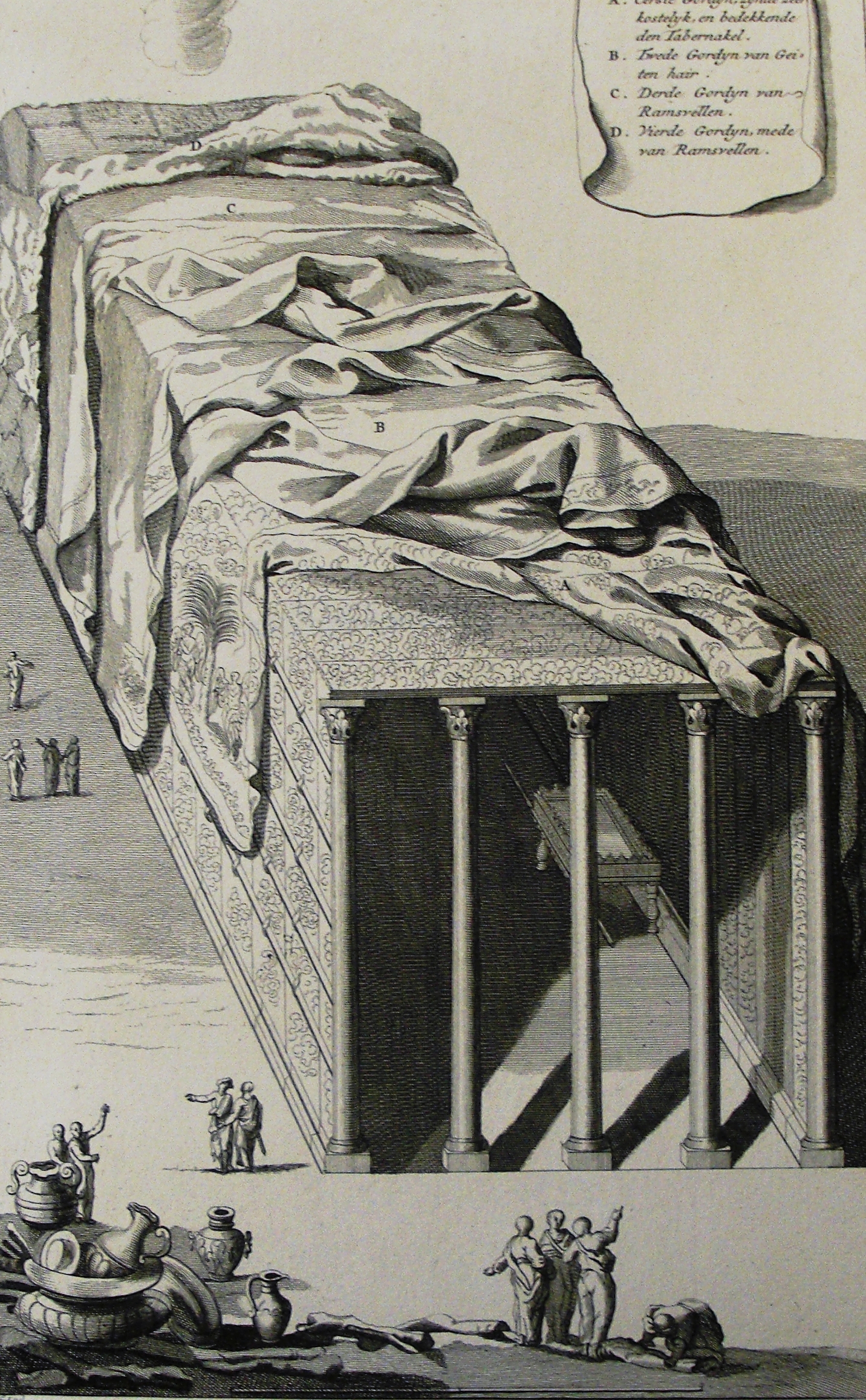
The Coverings of the Tabernacle (illustration from the Phillip Medhurst Collection of Bible illustrations in the possession of Reverend Philip De Vere at St. George's Court, Kidderminster, England)

Rav Hamnuna taught that God's decree that the generation of the spies would die in the wilderness did not apply to the Levites, for Numbers 14:29 says, "your carcasses shall fall in this wilderness, and all that were numbered of you, according to your whole number, from 20 years old and upward," and this implies that those who were numbered from 20 years old and upward came under the decree, while the tribe of Levi—which Numbers 4:3, 23, 30, 35, 39, 43, and 47 say was numbered from 30 years old and upward—was excluded from the decree.

The Gemara read the words of Numbers 4:25, "they shall bear the curtains of the Tabernacle, and the Tent of Meeting, its covering and the covering of sealskin that is above it," to treat the Tabernacle's upper covering of animal skins as a piece with the lower curtains of goats’ hair. The Gemara thus concluded that just as the lower covering could be called a "tent," so the upper covering could be considered a "tent" for purposes of impurity caused by a corpse.

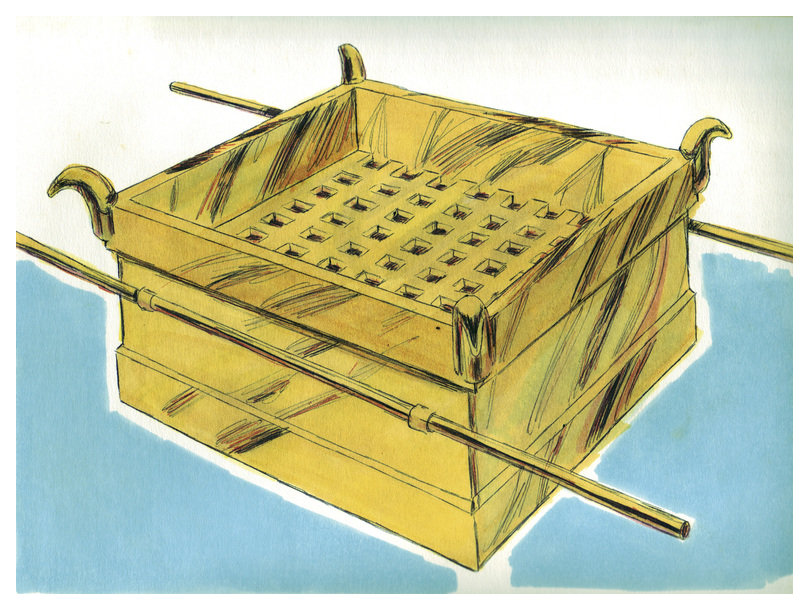
The Outer Altar (1984 illustration by Jim Padgett, courtesy of Sweet Publishing)

Rabbi Jose employed Numbers 4:26 to calculate the height of the walls of the courtyard in relation to the height of the outer altar. Rabbi Judah maintained that the outer altar was wider than Rabbi Jose thought it was, whereas Rabbi Jose maintained that the outer altar was taller than Rabbi Judah thought it was. Rabbi Jose said that one should read literally the words of Exodus 27:1, "five cubits long, and five cubits broad." But Rabbi Judah noted that Exodus 27:1 uses the word "square" (רָבוּעַ, ravua), just as Ezekiel 43:16 uses the word "square" (רָבוּעַ, ravua). Rabbi Judah argued that just as in Ezekiel 43:16, the dimension was measured from the center (so that the dimension described only one quadrant of the total), so the dimensions of Exodus 27:1 should be measured from the center (and thus, according to Rabbi Judah, the altar was 10 cubits on each side.) The Gemara explained that we know that this is how to understand Ezekiel 43:16 because Ezekiel 43:16 says, "And the hearth shall be 12 cubits long by 12 cubits broad, square," and Ezekiel 43:16 continues, "to the four sides thereof," teaching that the measurement was taken from the middle (interpreting "to" as intimating that from a particular point, there were 12 cubits in all directions, hence from the center). Rabbi Jose, however, reasoned that a common use of the word "square" applied to the height of the altar. Rabbi Judah said that one should read literally the words of Exodus 27:1, "And the height thereof shall be three cubits." But Rabbi Jose noted that Exodus 27:1 uses the word "square" (רָבוּעַ, ravua), just as Exodus 30:2 uses the word "square" (רָבוּעַ, ravua, referring to the inner altar). Rabbi Jose argued that just as in Exodus 30:2 the altar's height was twice its length, so too in Exodus 27:1, the height was to be read as twice its length (and thus the altar was 10 cubits high). Rabbi Judah questioned Rabbi Jose's conclusion, for if priests stood on the altar to perform the service 10 cubits above the ground, the people would see them from outside the courtyard. Rabbi Jose replied to Rabbi Judah that Numbers 4:26 states, "And the hangings of the court, and the screen for the door of the gate of the court, which is by the Tabernacle and by the altar round about," teaching that just as the Tabernacle was 10 cubits high, so was the altar 10 cubits high; and Exodus 38:14 says, "The hangings for the one side were fifteen cubits" (teaching that the walls of the courtyard were 15 cubits high). The Gemara explained that according to Rabbi Jose's reading, the words of Exodus 27:18, "And the height five cubits," meant from the upper edge of the altar to the top of the hangings. And according to Rabbi Jose, the words of Exodus 27:1, "and the height thereof shall be three cubits," meant that there were three cubits from the edge of the terrace (on the side of the altar) to the top of the altar. Rabbi Judah, however, granted that the priest could be seen outside the Tabernacle, but argued that the sacrifice in his hands could not be seen.

The Encampment of the Levites
		North		
		Merari		
West	Gershon	THE TABERNACLE	Priests	East
		Kohath		
		South		

A midrash taught that the Levites camped on the four sides of the Tabernacle in accordance with their duties. The midrash explained that from the west came snow, hail, cold, and heat, and thus God placed the Gershonites on the west, as Numbers 3:25 indicates that their service was "the tent, the covering thereof, and the screen for the door of the tent of meeting," which could shield against snow, hail, cold, and heat. The midrash explained that from the south came the dew and rain that bring blessing to the world, and there God placed the Kohathites, who bore the ark that carried the Torah, for as Leviticus 26:3–4 and 15–19 teach, the rains depend on the observance of the Torah. The midrash explained that from the north came darkness, and thus the Merarites camped there, as Numbers 4:31 indicates that their service was the carrying of wood ("the boards of the tabernacle, and the bars thereof, and the pillars thereof, and the sockets thereof") which Jeremiah 10:8 teaches counteract idolatrous influences when it says, "The chastisement of vanities is wood." And the midrash explained that from the east comes light, and thus Moses, Aaron, and his sons camped there, because they were scholars and men of pious deeds, bringing atonement by their prayer and sacrifices.

A midrash inferred from the words "from 30 years old . . . every one that entered upon the service" in Numbers 4:35 that a man attains his full strength at age 30.

Reading Numbers 4:47, "to do the work of service," the Gemara taught that Levites became unfit for service with the passage of years, as they were fit for service only between the ages of 30 and 50. The Gemara taught that priests, in contrast remained fit with the passage of years, from the moment that they reached majority for the rest of their lives. But the Gemara clarified that the mandatory retirement requirement for Levites at the age of 50 applied only with regard to the Tent of Meeting of the Tabernacle in the wilderness, whereas with regard to Shiloh and in the Temple in Jerusalem, Levites were disqualified only due to a change in voice that rendered them unable to recite the songs in the Temple.

Belvati in the name of Rabbi Joḥanan derived the Levite's obligation to sing songs while offering sacrifices from the words of Numbers 4:47, "to do the work of service." Belvati reasoned that the work that requires service is the song.

=== Numbers chapter 5 ===
Rabbi Levi taught that the discussion of how to purify the camp in Numbers 5:1–4 was one of eight passages given to Moses on the day that the Tabernacle was erected, because the people needed to implement them immediately. Those who were ritually impure needed to be excluded from the camp before the construction and dedication of the Tabernacle took place otherwise the camp and Tabernacle would have been defiled from the outset. Rabbi Joḥanan said in the name of Rabbi Bana'ah that the Torah was transmitted in separate scrolls, as Psalm 40:8 says, "Then said I, 'Lo I am come, in the roll of the book it is written of me.'" Rabbi Simeon ben Lakish (Resh Lakish), however, said that the Torah was transmitted in its entirety, as Deuteronomy 31:26 says, "Take this book of the law." The Gemara reported that Rabbi Joḥanan interpreted Deuteronomy 31:26, "Take this book of the law," to refer to the time after the Torah had been joined together from its several parts. And the Gemara suggested that Resh Lakish interpreted Psalm 40:8, "in a roll of the book written of me," to indicate that the whole Torah is called a "roll," as Zechariah 5:2 says, "And he said to me, 'What do you see?' And I answered, 'I see a flying roll.'" Or perhaps, the Gemara suggested, it is called "roll" for the reason given by Rabbi Levi, who said that God gave eight sections of the Torah, which Moses then wrote on separate rolls, on the day on which the Tabernacle was set up. They were: the section of the priests in Leviticus 21, the section of the Levites in Numbers 8:5–26 (as the Levites were required for the service of song on that day), the section of the unclean (who would be required to keep the Passover in the second month) in Numbers 9:1–14, the section of the sending of the unclean out of the camp (which also had to take place before the Tabernacle was set up) in Numbers 5:1–4, the section of Leviticus 16:1–34 (dealing with Yom Kippur, which Leviticus 16:1 states was transmitted immediately after the death of Aaron's two sons), the section dealing with the drinking of wine by priests in Leviticus 10:8–11, the section of the lights of the menorah in Numbers 8:1–4, and the section of the red heifer in Numbers 19 (which came into force as soon as the Tabernacle was set up).

Rabbi Simeon ben Lakish (Resh Lakish) employed Numbers 5:2—"Command the children of Israel that they send out from the camp anyone with an eruption or a discharge and anyone impure by reason of a corpse"—to support the proposition that if most of the nation was ritually impure, they offered the Paschal sacrifice anyway. Resh Lakish reasoned that the verse could have said only that they were to send out those who were ritually impure due to a corpse, and not said anything about those with an eruption or a discharge, and one could have deduced through an a fortiori inference that those with an eruption or a discharge—whose impurity is more severe—would also need to be sent out. Resh Lakish deduced that the verse thus contains unnecessary information. Resh Lakish concluded from this that the verse must be teaching that there could be a time when anyone with an eruption or a discharge were sent out from the camp, but those who were ritually impure due to contact with a corpse were not sent out. And this time was when a Paschal lamb was brought in impurity, when those impure due to contact with a corpse were permitted to participate, but those with an eruption or a discharge were not. This, Resh Lakish said, supported the conclusion that when most of the nation was ritually impure due to contact with a corpse, they brought the Paschal lamb anyway in a state of ritual impurity.

Chapter 9 of Tractate Bava Kamma in the Mishnah and Babylonian Talmud and chapters 9 and 10 in the Tosefta interpreted the laws of restitution in Numbers 5:6–8 together with Leviticus 5:21–26.

Reading Numbers 5:6, "When a man or woman shall commit any sin," Rav Judah said on behalf of Rav, and it was also taught at the school of Rabbi Ishmael, that Scripture thus made women and men equal regarding all the penalties of the Law. The Gemara cited this conclusion to support the ruling of the Mishnah that women are subject to the law of torts.

The Mishnah taught that if a thief stole something worth a perutah (the minimum amount of significant value) and the thief nonetheless swore falsely that the thief did not do so, the thief was obliged to take restitution to the victim even if the thief needed to go as far as Media (in what is now Iran). The thief could not give restitution to the victim's son or agent, but the thief could give it to an agent of the court. If the victim died, the thief had to give it to the victim's heirs.

The Mishnah taught that if the thief paid back the principal to the victim but did not pay the additional fifth required by Leviticus 5:24; or if the victim excused the thief the principal but not the fifth; or the victim excused the thief both the principal and the fifth, except for something less than the value of a perutah remaining of the principal, then the thief would not have to go after the victim to repay the victim. (The Mishnah did not consider the payment of the fifth as an essential condition of atonement.) If, however, the thief paid the victim the fifth but not the principal; or the victim excused the thief the fifth but not the principal; or even where the victim excused the thief for both, except for something more than the value of a perutah remaining of the principal, then the thief would have to convey it personally to the victim (even as far as Media).

The Mishnah taught that if the thief paid the principal back to the victim and took an oath falsely that the thief had paid the fifth required by Leviticus 5:24, the thief would have to pay the victim an additional fifth of the fifth and so on until the principal of the last fifth about which the thief swore was reduced to less than the value of a perutah.

The Mishnah taught that the rules of restitution also applied to the case of a deposit, as Leviticus 5:21–22 says: "In that which was delivered him to keep, or in fellowship, or in a thing taken away by violence, or has deceived his neighbor, or has found that which was lost and lies concerning it and swears falsely." The custodian had to pay the principal and the fifth required by Leviticus 5:24 and bring a trespass offering as required by Leviticus 5:25. If the depositor asked where the thing deposited was, and an unpaid custodian replied that it was lost, and the depositor then imposed an oath on the custodian, and the custodian swore that the deposit was lost, if witnesses then testified that the custodian consumed the thing deposited, then the custodian had to repay the principal. If the custodian confessed, the custodian had to pay the principal together with a fifth and bring a trespass offering, as required by Leviticus 5:21–24. If, however, the depositor asked where the thing deposited was, and the custodian replied that it was stolen, and the depositor then imposed an oath on the custodian, and the custodian swore that the someone else took the thing deposited, if witnesses testified that the custodian stole it, then the custodian had to repay double as required by Exodus 22:8. But if the custodian confessed on the custodian's own accord, then the custodian had to repay the principal together with a fifth and bring a trespass offering, as required by Leviticus 5:21–24.

The Mishnah taught that if a thief stole from the thief's father and, when charged by the father, denied it on oath, and the father then died before the thief confessed to the father's heirs, then the thief would have to repay the principal and a fifth to the father's other children or to the father's brothers (the thief's uncles) if the thief had no siblings. But if the thief was unwilling to forfeit the thief's share in the payment that thief had to make, or if the thief had no resources, then the thief was to borrow the amount from others and perform the duty of restoration to the heirs, and the creditors could subsequently claim the portion that would by law have belonged to the thief as heir.

Reading Numbers 5:8, Rabbi Ishmael asked what Jew would not have a kinsman to whom to make restitution, as all Jews descend from Jacob and thus are all kin. Rabbi Ishmael thus interpreted Numbers 5:8 to apply to one who robs a convert and makes an oath to the convert, but before the thief can make restitution, the convert dies without any wife or children (viewing a convert as a newborn, without relationship to those born prior to the convert's conversion).

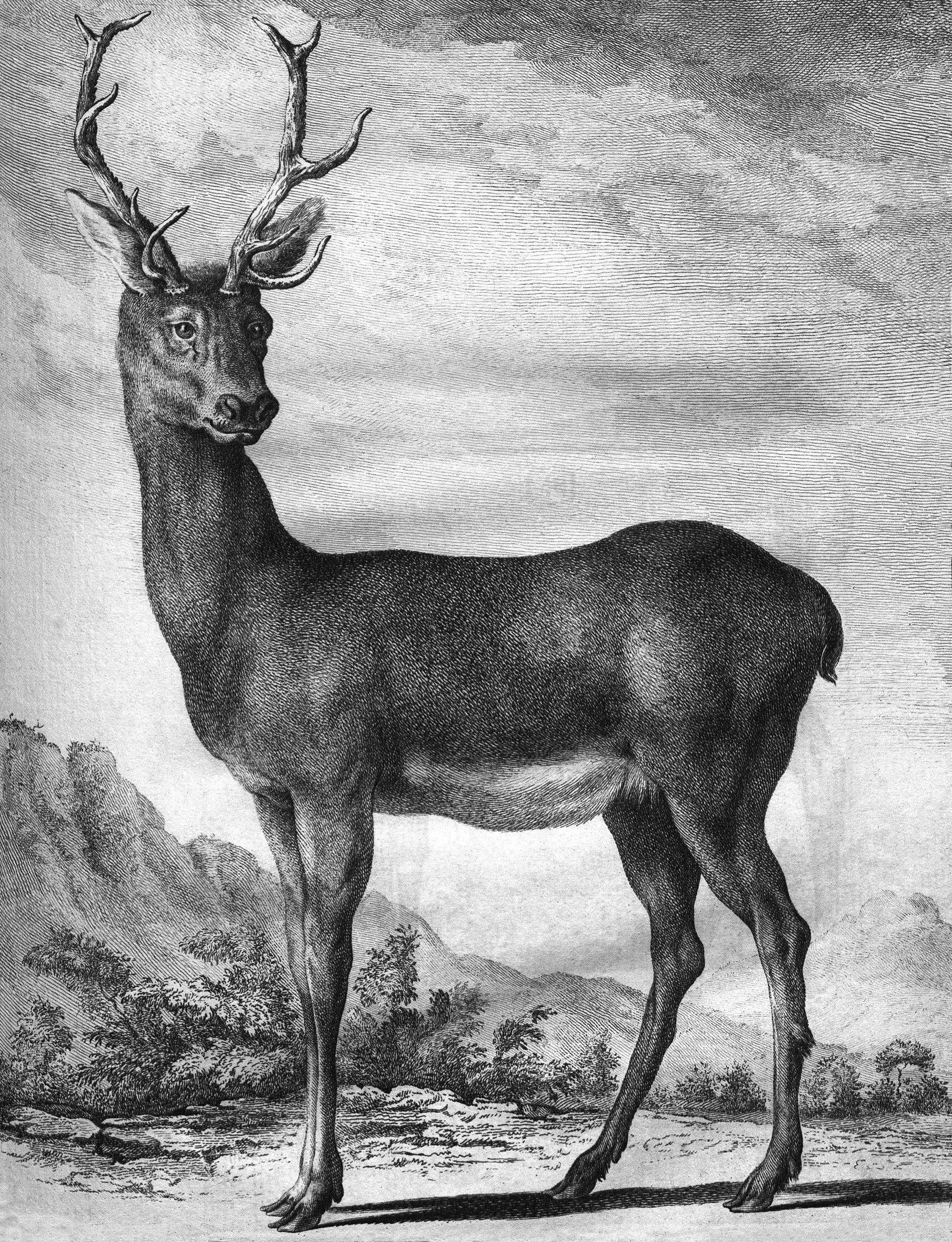
A Stag (from the 1756 Illustrations de Histoire naturelle générale et particulière avec la description du cabinet du roy)

A midrash read Numbers 5:6–8 together with Psalm 146:8–9, which the midrash read as, "The Lord loves the righteous; the Lord preserves the converts." The midrash taught that God loves those who love God, and thus God loves the righteous, because their worth is due neither to heritage nor to family. The midrash compared God's great love of converts to a king who had a flock of goats, and once a stag came in with the flock. When the king was told that the stag had joined the flock, the king felt an affection for the stag and gave orders that the stag have good pasture and drink and that no one beat him. When the king's servants asked him why he protected the stag, the king explained that the flock have no choice, but the stag did. The king accounted it as a merit to the stag that had left behind the whole of the broad, vast wilderness, the abode of all the beasts, and had come to stay in the courtyard. In like manner, God provides converts with special protection, for God exhorted Israel not to harm them, as Deuteronomy 10:19 says, "Love therefore the convert," and Exodus 23:9 says, "And a convert shall you not oppress." In the same manner also as the Numbers 5:6–8 has imposed upon one who robs another the obligation of a money payment and of a sacrifice of a ram of atonement, so the Torah imposes upon one who robs a convert the obligation of paying the convert the money and of bringing a sacrifice of a ram of atonement. The midrash taught that Numbers 5:6–8 thus refers to one who robs a convert, in consonance with Psalm 146:9, "The Lord preserves the converts." Thus, God made provision for safeguarding converts so that they might not return to their former lives.

The Mishnah interpreted the requirements of Numbers 5:8 regarding restitution where the victim died without kin to apply when a convert victim died. The wrongdoer would have to pay the priests the principal plus 20 percent and bring a trespass offering to the altar. If the wrongdoer died bringing the money and the offering to Jerusalem, the money was to go to the wrongdoer's heirs, and the offering was to be kept on the pasture until it became blemished, when it was to be sold and the proceeds were to go to the fund for freewill offerings. But if the wrongdoer had already given the money to the priest and then died, the heirs could not retrieve the funds, for Numbers 5:10 provides that "whatever any man gives to the priest shall be his."

==== The Sotah ====
Tractate Sotah in the Mishnah, Tosefta, Jerusalem Talmud, and Babylonian Talmud interpreted the laws of the woman accused of being unfaithful (סוטה, sotah) in Numbers 5:11–31.

Hezekiah the son of Rabbi Parnak said in the name of Rabbi Joḥanan that the laws of the woman accused of being unfaithful follow immediately the laws dealing with the heave offering (תְּרוּמָה, terumah) and tithes to teach that if one has a heave offering or a tithe and does not give it to the priest, in the end he will require the priest's services to deal with his wife. For Numbers 5:10 says, "Every man's hallowed things shall be his," and immediately afterwards Numbers 5:12 says, "If any man's wife go aside," and thereafter Numbers 5:15 says, "the man shall bring his wife to the priest." Even more, in the end, such a person would need the tithe for the poor, as Numbers 5:10 says, "Every man's hallowed things shall be his" (in the form of a tithe for the poor). In contrast, Rav Nachman bar Yitzchak taught that if he does give, he will eventually become rich. For Numbers 5:10 says, "Whatever a man gives the priest, he shall have," and that means that he shall have much wealth.

The Mishnah taught that before a husband could accuse his wife pursuant to Numbers 5:11–31, he had to warn her not to associate with a certain man. Rabbi Eliezer said that he warned her on the testimony of two witnesses and made her drink the bitter water on the testimony of one witness or his own testimony. Rabbi Joshua said that he warned her on the testimony of two witnesses and made her drink on the testimony of two witnesses.

The Mishnah taught that it was not sufficient for the husband simply to say to his wife (in the presence of two witnesses) not to converse with a man. And if she nonetheless conversed with him, she was still permitted to her husband and if she was a daughter of a priest, still permitted to eat from sacrifices. If, however, she entered a private place with the man and stayed with him long enough to have committed misconduct, she was forbidden to her husband and forbidden to eat from sacrifices, and if her husband died, she was required to perform the ceremony of ḥalizah and could not contract a levirate marriage.

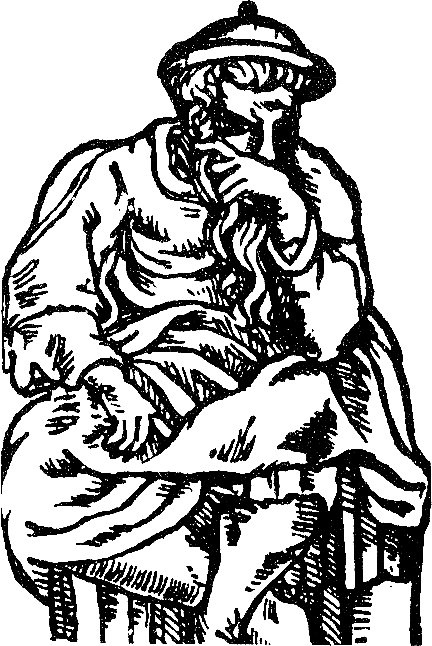
Rabbi Akiva (illustration from the 1568 Mantua Haggadah)

The Mishnah deduced from the two uses of the words "they shall enter" in Numbers 5:22 and 27 that just as the bitter water tested the suspected wife, so it tested the suspected paramour, punishing him as well if they were guilty. And Rabbi Akiva taught that if she was guilty, just as she was prohibited to her husband (who would have to divorce her), so was she prohibited to the paramour (and could not marry him), for Numbers 5:29 says, "defiled . . . And is defiled." Rabbi Joshua taught that Zechariah ben HaKazav used to expound the matter that way. And Rabbi taught that the word "defiled" occurs twice in Numbers 5:14 and 29 because one occurrence referred to her being prohibited to the husband and the other to the paramour. The Gemara explained that just as the guilty woman would be punished in her belly and thigh, so too would the paramour.

Reading the report of Exodus 32:20 that Moses "took the calf . . . ground it to powder, and sprinkled it on the water, and made the children of Israel drink it," the Sages interpreted that Moses meant to test the Israelites much as the procedure of Numbers 5:11–31 tested a wife accused of adultery.

A midrash taught that there is nothing greater before God than the "amen" that Israel answers. Rabbi Judah ben Sima taught that the word "amen" contains three kinds of solemn declarations: oath, consent, and confirmation. Numbers 5:21–22 demonstrates oath when it says, "Then the priest shall cause the woman to swear . . . and the woman shall say: 'Amen, Amen.'" Deuteronomy 27:26 demonstrates consent when it says, "And all the people shall say: 'Amen.'" And 1 Kings 1:36 demonstrates confirmation when it says, "And Benaiah the son of Jehoiada answered the king, and said: 'Amen; so say the Lord.'"

A midrash told of two sisters who looked alike. The first sister was married and lived in one city, and the second sister was also married and lived in another city. The first sister's husband accused her of infidelity and sought to bring her to Jerusalem to drink the bitter waters. That sister went to the second sister and told her of her predicament. The second sister volunteered to go in her stead and drink, and the first sister agreed. The second sister dressed herself in the first sister's clothes and drank the bitter waters and was found not guilty. She returned to the home of the first sister, who came out to greet her and embraced her sister and kissed her on the lips. When they kissed one another, the first sister breathed in the smell of the bitter waters and immediately died, as Ecclesiastes 8:8 sys, "No human has control over the wind to contain the wind, nor is there control on the day of death."

A baraita read Numbers 5:31, "And the man shall be cleared of transgression, and that woman shall bear her transgression," to teach that when the husband was clear of transgression, the waters evaluated his wife's faithfulness, but if the husband was not clear of transgression, the waters did not evaluate his wife's faithfulness.

The Mishnah taught that when adulterers multiplied, Rabban Joḥanan ben Zakkai discontinued the ceremony of Numbers 5:11–31, as Hosea 4:14 says, "I will not punish your daughters when they commit harlotry, nor your daughters-in-law when they commit adultery; for they themselves consort with lewd women, and they sacrifice with harlots; and the people that is without understanding is distraught."

=== Numbers chapter 6 ===
==== The Nazirite ====
Tractate Nazir in the Mishnah, Tosefta, Jerusalem Talmud, and Babylonian Talmud interpreted the laws of the nazirite (נָזִיר, nazir) in Numbers 6:1–21.

It was taught in a baraita that Rabbi taught that the laws of the nazirite in Numbers 6:1–21 follow immediately those of the woman accused of being unfaithful in Numbers 5:11–31 to teach that anyone who sees an unfaithful wife in her ruination should (take a lesson from her ways and) completely abstain from wine (for wine brought her to her end). Similarly, a midrash taught that when they made the suspected wife drink, they told her that much might have been due to wine. And all the Israelites who had seen it would come home and bemoan the person who had drunk wine, got intoxicated, committed sin, and died. And so, they would swear never to taste wine, so that they might not meet the same fate. And the midrash provided another explanation: Just as the nazirite was separated from wine, so God separated the faithless wife from other women. Similarly, another midrash taught that wine leads to whoredom. And thus, God wrote the section about the nazirite after the section about the suspected wife to indicate that one should not copy the deeds of the adulterer and adulteress who drank wine and disgraced themselves, but that one who is afraid of sin should separate from wine.

The Sifre taught that the words of Numbers 6:2, "When either man or woman shall clearly utter a vow, the vow of a nazirite," excluded minors from taking such a vow. The Sifre taught that the rule of Numbers 6:2 thus applied only to those who knew the meaning of making such a special vow. And on that basis the rule of Mishnah Niddah 5:6 was given that the vows of a boy of the age of 12 years and one day must be examined to determine whether the boy understood their significance.

The Sifre taught that the words of Numbers 6:2, "shall clearly utter a vow, the vow of a nazirite, to consecrate himself unto the Lord," applied only if the person took the vow willingly and not under duress.

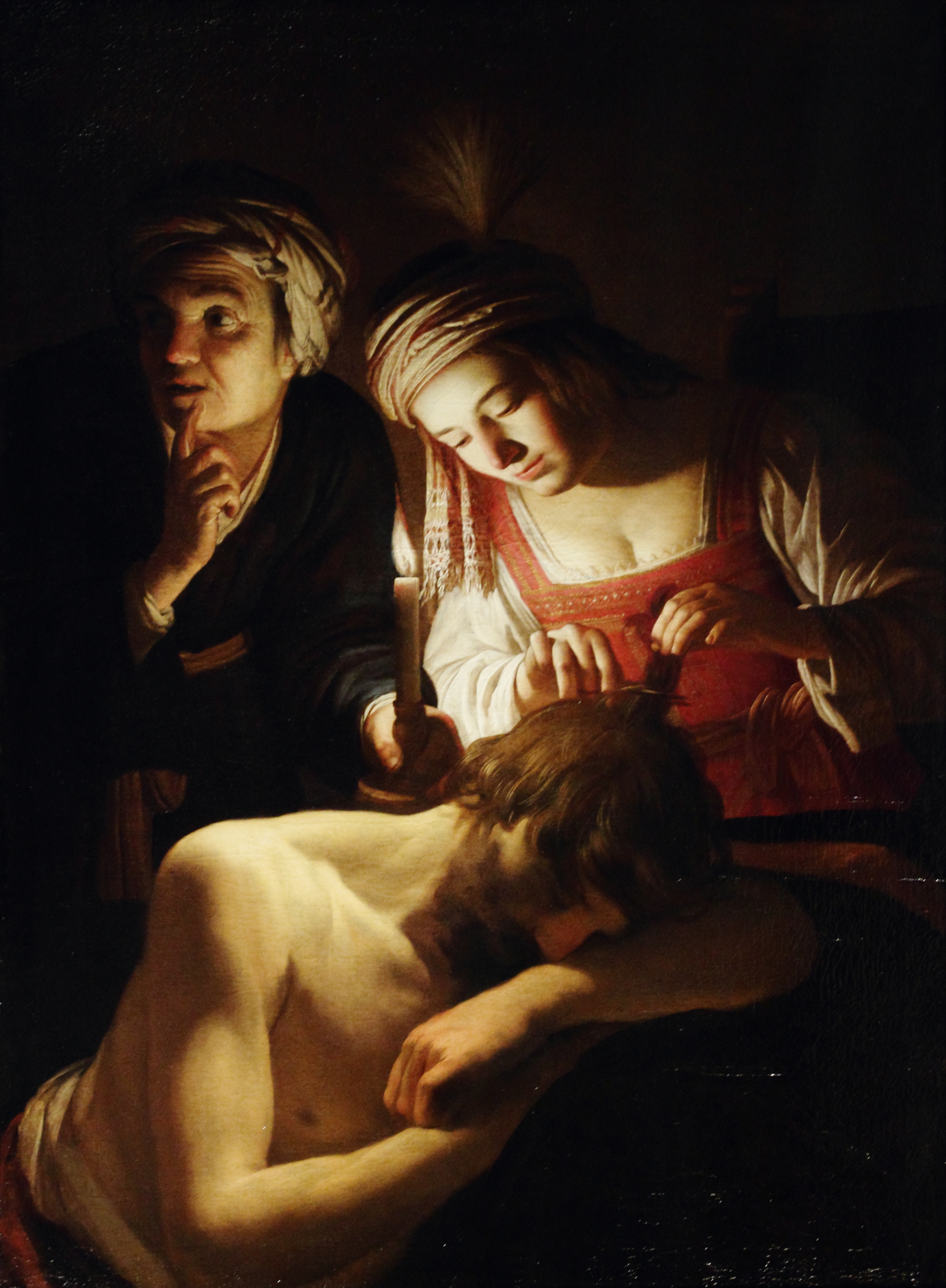
Samson and Delilah (1615 painting by Gerard van Honthorst)

The Mishnah interpreted the "nazirite's vow" of Numbers 6:2. The Mishnah taught that all substitutes for a nazirite vow functioned just like a nazirite vow. A person who said, "I shall be one," became a nazirite. A person who said, "I shall be comely," "a nazirite," "a nazik," "a naziah," or "a paziah," became a nazirite. A person who said, "I intend to be like this," or "I intend to curl my hair," or "I mean to tend my hair," or "I undertake to develop tresses," became a nazirite. Rabbi Meir said that a person who said, "I take upon myself an obligation involving birds," became a nazirite," but the sages said that this person did not become a nazirite.

A person who said, "I declare myself a nazirite to abstain from pressed grapes," or "from grape stones," or "from cutting my hair," or "from contracting ritual defilement," became a nazirite subject to all the regulations of naziriteship.

A person who said, "I vow to be like Samson," "the son of Manoah," "the husband of Delilah," or "the one who plucked up the gates of Gaza," or "the one whose eyes the Philistines put out," became a nazirite like Samson (who was a nazirite for life). The difference between nazirites like Samson and life-nazirites was that life-nazirites could thin their hair with a razor and then offer three animal sacrifices, while should they be ritually defiled, they had to offer the sacrifice prescribed for defilement. Nazirites like Samson were not permitted to thin their hair, and if ritually defiled, they did not offer the sacrifice prescribed for defilement.

A nazirite vow of unspecified duration remained in force 30 days.

The Sifre asked why Numbers 6:1–4 set forth the effectiveness of nazirite vows, when the general rule of Numbers 30:2 would suffice to teach that all vows—including nazirite vows—are binding. The Sifre explained that Numbers 6:1–4 warned that a person making a nazirite vow would be bound to at least a 30-day nazirite period.

A person who said, "I intend to be a nazirite for one long period," or "I intend to be a nazirite for one short period," became a nazirite for 30 days, even if the person added, "for as long as it takes to go from here to the end of the earth." A person who said, "I intend to be a nazirite, plus one day," or "I intend to be a nazirite, plus an hour," or "I intend to be a nazirite, once and a half," became a nazirite for two 30-day periods. A person who said, "I intend to be a nazirite for 30 days plus an hour," became a nazirite for 31 days, as there was no naziriteship for a period of hours.

People who said, "I intend to be a nazirite as the hairs of my head," or "the dust of the earth," or "the sands of the sea," became life-nazirites, cutting their hair every 30 days. Rabbi said that such nazirites did not cut their hair every 30 days. Rabbi said that the nazirites who cut their hair every 30 days were the ones who said, "I undertake naziriteships as the hair on my head," or "the dust of the earth," or "the sands of the sea."

They interrogated people who said, "I intend to be a nazirite a house full," or "a basket full," to determine their intent. A person who said, "I vowed one long period of naziriteship," became a nazirite for 30 days. But a person who said, "I vowed without attaching any precise meaning to the statement," became a nazirite for life, as the Rabbis regarded the basket as though it were full of mustard seed.

If a person said, "I intend to be a nazirite, as from here to such and such a place," they estimated the number of days that it took to get to the place mentioned. If the journey would take fewer than 30 days, then the nazirite becomes a nazirite for 30 days; otherwise the nazirite became a nazirite for that number of days.

A person who said, "I intend to be a nazirite, as the number of days in a solar year," would be a nazirite for 365 terms. Rabbi Judah said that such a case once occurred, and when the nazirite completed the 365 terms, the nazirite died.

Rabbi Simeon the Just was so skeptical of the reasons for which nazirites might have interrupted their status that he found only one that he really trusted. He said that only once in his life had he eaten of the trespass-offering brought by a defiled tear in connection with an interrupted nazirite vow. On that occasion a nazirite came from the south country, and Simeon the Just saw that he had beautiful eyes, was of handsome appearance, and with thick locks of hair symmetrically arranged. Simeon the Just asked him what reason the nazirite had seen to destroy this beautiful hair by shaving it for the nazirite vow. The nazirite replied that he was a shepherd for his father and once he went to draw water from a well and gazed upon his reflection in the water, and his evil desires rushed upon him and sought to drive him from the world through sin. But the shepherd swore that day that he would shave his beautiful hair off for the sake of Heaven. Simeon the Just immediately arose and kissed the nazirite's head, praying that there would be many nazirites such as him in Israel. And Simeon the Just said that it was of this nazirite that Numbers 6:2 says, "When either a man or a woman shall separate themselves to vow a vow of a nazirite, to separate themselves unto the Lord." Rabbi Mani inquired why Simeon the Just did not eat of the guilt-offering of a nazirite. If it was because the nazirite was a sinner because he tormented himself, depriving himself of wine, that would be inconsistent with ever eating of the sin-offering (for example) for tasting forbidden fat or of the sin-offering for tasting blood. Simeon the Just thought that people made the nazirite vow in a fit of temper, and since they vowed in a fit of temper, they would ultimately come to regret it. And once they regretted it, their sacrifices become like those of people who slaughtered unconsecrated animals in the Temple court (which would be disrespectful and forbidden). This nazirite, however, vowed after due mental deliberation and his mouth and heart were in agreement.

The Mishnah taught that Numbers 6:2–8 forbade a nazirite three things: ritual defilement, cutting of hair, and products of the vine. The Mishnah taught that all products of the vine could be measured together, and that there was no penalty for violation of the nazirite's vow unless the nazirite ate an olive's bulk of grapes or drank a quarter of a log of wine. Rabbi Akiva said that there was a penalty even if the nazirite soaked bread in wine and enough was absorbed to make up an olive's bulk.

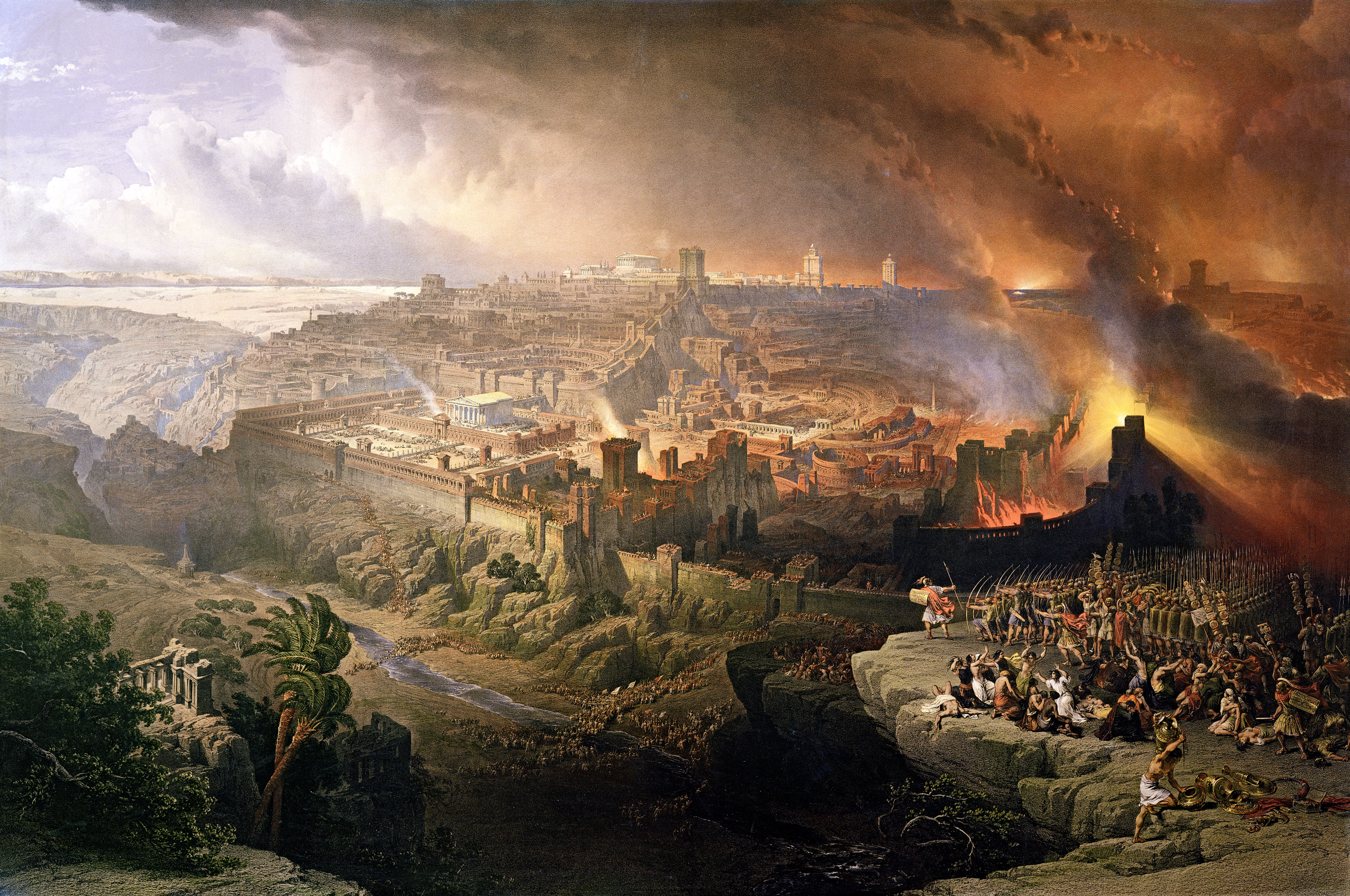
Siege and Destruction of Jerusalem by the Romans (1850 painting by David Roberts)

The Mishnah taught that there was a separate penalty for wine, for grapes, for grape seeds, and for grape skins. But Rabbi Eleazar ben Azariah said that there was no penalty for grape seeds or grape skins unless the nazirite ate at least two grape seeds and one grape skin.

In the Talmud, Rabbi Joshua discouraged asceticism and abstaining from wine. The Rabbis taught in a baraita that when the Romans destroyed the Second Temple, large numbers of Judeans became ascetics, binding themselves neither to eat meat nor to drink wine. Rabbi Joshua asked the ascetics why they did not eat meat or drink wine. The ascetics asked how they could eat meat when priests used to offer meat on the altar that the Romans had destroyed. And they asked how they could drink wine when priests used to pour wine as a libation on the altar (as part of the Temple service) but did so no more. Rabbi Joshua told them that according to their logic, they should not eat bread either, as the meal offerings had ceased. The ascetics agreed, saying that they could live on fruit. Rabbi Joshua told them that they should not eat fruit either, for there was no longer an offering of first fruits. The ascetics replied that they could manage with fruits of types that the Israelites had not brought as first fruits. But Rabbi Joshua told them that they should not drink water either, for there was no longer a ceremony of the pouring of water (on Sukkot, as described in Mishnah Sukkah). To this the ascetics had no answer. So Rabbi Joshua taught them that not to mourn at all was impossible, because the Temple had been destroyed. But to mourn too much was also impossible, because we may not impose on the community a hardship that the majority cannot endure.

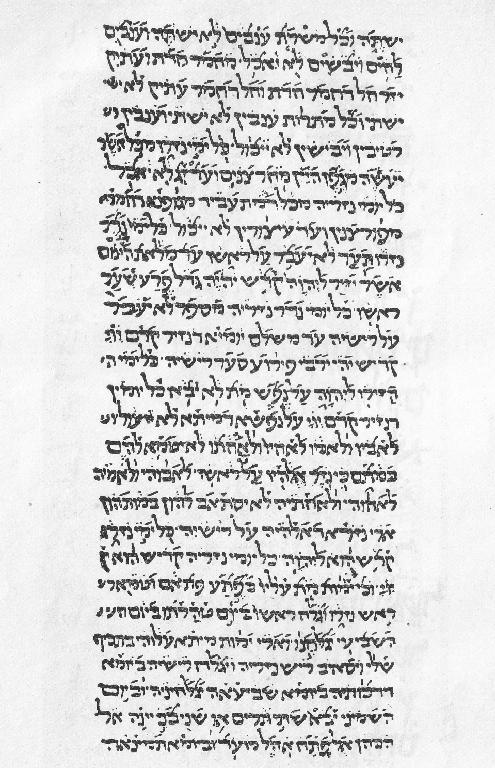
Numbers 6:3–10 in Hebrew alternating with the Aramaic Targum Onkelos in a 12th-century manuscript from the British Library

If nazirites cut their hair or had their hair cut by bandits, 30 days of their nazirite term were rendered void. Nazirites who cut their own hair incurred a penalty, no matter whether they used scissors or a razor, or no matter how little they trimmed their hair. Nazirites were allowed to clean their hair or part it with their fingers, but they were not allowed to comb it. Rabbi Ishmael said that they were not allowed to clean their hair with earth, because it causes the hair to fall out.

A nazirite who drank wine all day long incurred only a single penalty. If the nazirite was repeatedly warned not to drink and then drank anyway, the nazirite incurred a penalty for each warning. Similarly, nazirites who cut their hair all day long incurred only one penalty, but if they were repeatedly warned not to cut and then cut anyway, they incurred a penalty for each warning. And similarly, nazirites who defile themselves by contact with the dead all day long incurred only one penalty, but if they were repeatedly warned not to defile themselves and then defiled themselves anyway, they incurred a penalty for each warning.

The Mishnah taught that defilement and cutting of hair had a stringency that products of the vine did not, as defilement and cutting of hair rendered void the previous period of nazirite observance, while consuming products of the vine did not. Products of the vine had a stringency that defilement or cutting of hair did not, as the prohibition of products of the vine had no exception, while the law allowed exceptions for where cutting of hair was a religious duty or where there was an abandoned corpse. Defilement also had a stringency that cutting of hair did not, as defilement rendered void the whole of the preceding period and entails the offering of a sacrifice, while cutting of hair rendered voided only 30 days and did not entail a sacrifice.

The Sifre compared the prohibition of a nazirite having contact with dead bodies in Numbers 6:6–7 with the similar prohibition of a High Priest having contact with dead bodies in Leviticus 21:11. And the Sifre reasoned that just as the High Priest was required nonetheless to become unclean to see to the burial of a neglected corpse (met mitzvah), so too was the nazirite required to become unclean to see to the burial of a neglected corpse.

The Mishnah employed the prohibition of Numbers 6:6 to imagine how one could with one action violate up to nine separate commandments. One could (1) plow with an ox and a donkey yoked together (in violation of Deuteronomy 22:10) (2 and 3) that are two animals dedicated to the sanctuary, (4) plowing mixed seeds sown in a vineyard (in violation of Deuteronomy 22:9), (5) during a Sabbatical year (in violation of Leviticus 25:4), (6) on a Festival-day (in violation of, for example, Leviticus 23:7), (7) when the plower is a priest (in violation of Leviticus 21:1) and (8) a nazirite (in violation of Numbers 6:6) plowing in a contaminated place. Ḥananya ben Ḥaḥinai said that the plower also may have been wearing a garment of wool and linen (in violation of Leviticus 19:19 and Deuteronomy 22:11). They said to him that this would not be in the same category as the other violations. He replied that neither is the nazirite in the same category as the other violations.

Tractate Kinnim in the Mishnah interpreted the laws of pairs of sacrificial pigeons and doves in Leviticus 1:14, 5:7, 12:6–8, 14:22, and 15:29; and Numbers 6:10.

The Mishnah taught that they buried the cut hair of a nazirite.

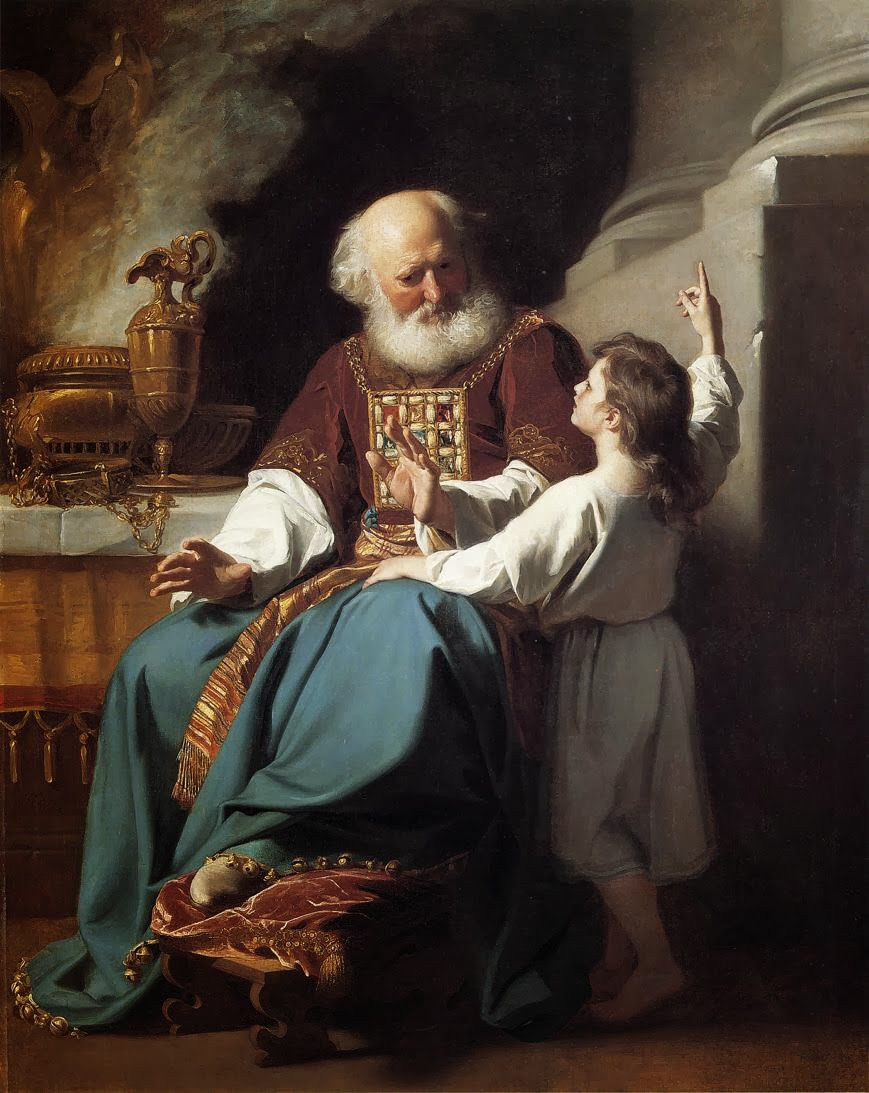
Eli and Samuel (1780 painting by John Singleton Copley)

Queen Helena of Adiabene converted to Judaism. When her son went to war, she vowed that if he returned in peace, she would be a nazirite for seven years. Her son did return, and she observed her nazirite vow for seven years. At the end of the seven years, she went to the Land of Israel and the House of Hillel ruled that she had to be a nazirite for seven more years. Towards the end of this seven years, she contracted ritual defilement, and so altogether she was a nazirite for 21 years. Rabbi Judah said that she was a nazirite for only 14 years (plus 30 days). If a person vowed a naziriteship of long duration and completed it and then arrived in the Land of Israel, the House of Shammai taught that the person would then need to be a nazirite for 30 more days, but House of Hillel taught that the person's naziriteship began for its full term again as at the first.

In the Mishnah, the Sages related of Miriam of Tarmod that one kind of blood was sprinkled on her behalf when she was told that her daughter was dangerously ill. She went and found her daughter had died (and thus Miriam became accidentally unclean), and the sages told her to offer her remaining sacrifices after purification.

The Mishnah reported that Rabbi Nehorai taught that Samuel was a nazirite, as in 1 Samuel 1:11, Samuel's mother Hannah vowed, "and no razor (מוֹרָה, morah) shall come upon his head." Similarly, in Judges 13:5 (in the haftarah for the parashah), an angel told Samson's mother, "no razor (מוֹרָה, morah) shall come upon his head; for the child shall be a nazirite unto God from the womb." The Mishnah reasoned that just as Scripture used "razor" (מוֹרָה, morah) in the case of Samson to show that he was a nazirite, so Scripture used "razor" (מוֹרָה, morah) in the case of Samuel to show that he was a nazirite.

Rabbi Eleazar ha-Kappar taught that Numbers 6:11 required priests to "make atonement for" nazirites because the nazirites denied themselves wine. Rabbi Eleazar ha-Kappar thus reasoned that if nazirites were considered sinners because they denied themselves wine, then those who fast voluntarily or deprive themselves of other things are sinners, too. But Rabbi Eleazar said that the nazirite was termed "holy," as Numbers 6:5 says, "he shall be holy, he shall let the locks of the hair of his head grow long." Rabbi Eleazar thus reasoned that if nazirites were considered holy because they denied themselves just wine, then those who fast voluntarily are holy, too.

It was taught in a baraita that Rabbi Judah taught that the early pious ones were eager to bring a sin-offering, because God never caused them to sin. So they made a free-will nazirite vow to God, so as to be able to bring a sin-offering. But Rabbi Simeon taught that the early pious ones did not make nazirite vows. They would bring offerings freely, but they did not take nazirite vows, so as not to be designated sinners. For Numbers 6:11 says, "And [the priest] shall make atonement for him, for that he sinned against a soul."

Abaye summarized that Simeon the Just, Rabbi Simeon, and Rabbi Eleazar ha-Kappar all came to the same conclusion—that a nazirite was a sinner. The Gemara questioned whether Numbers 6:11 might refer only to a nazirite who became unclean. But the Gemara concluded that Numbers 6:11 says that the priest must "make atonement" because the nazirite who became unclean sinned twice (both by becoming a nazirite at all and by defiling his nazirite vow).

Similarly, Rav taught that a person will have to give account on the judgment day for every good permissible thing that the person might have enjoyed and did not.

Similarly, Hillel the Elder taught that washing one's body in the bathhouse was a religious duty. For if the statues of kings, which were inscribed in theatres and circuses, were scoured and washed by the person appointed to look after them, how much more should a person, who has been created in the Image and Likeness of God, as Genesis 9:6 says, "For in the image of God made He man." A midrash thus taught that Proverbs 11:17, "The merciful man does good to his own soul," applies to this teaching of Hillel the Elder.

The Gemara taught that there were three who were required to cut their hair, and whose hair cutting was a religious duty: nazirites (as stated in Numbers 6:18), those afflicted with skin disease (מְּצֹרָע, metzora, as stated in Leviticus 14:9), and the Levites. Citing the Mishnah, the Gemara taught that if any of them cut their hair without a razor, or left behind two hairs, their act was invalid.

==== The Priestly Blessing ====
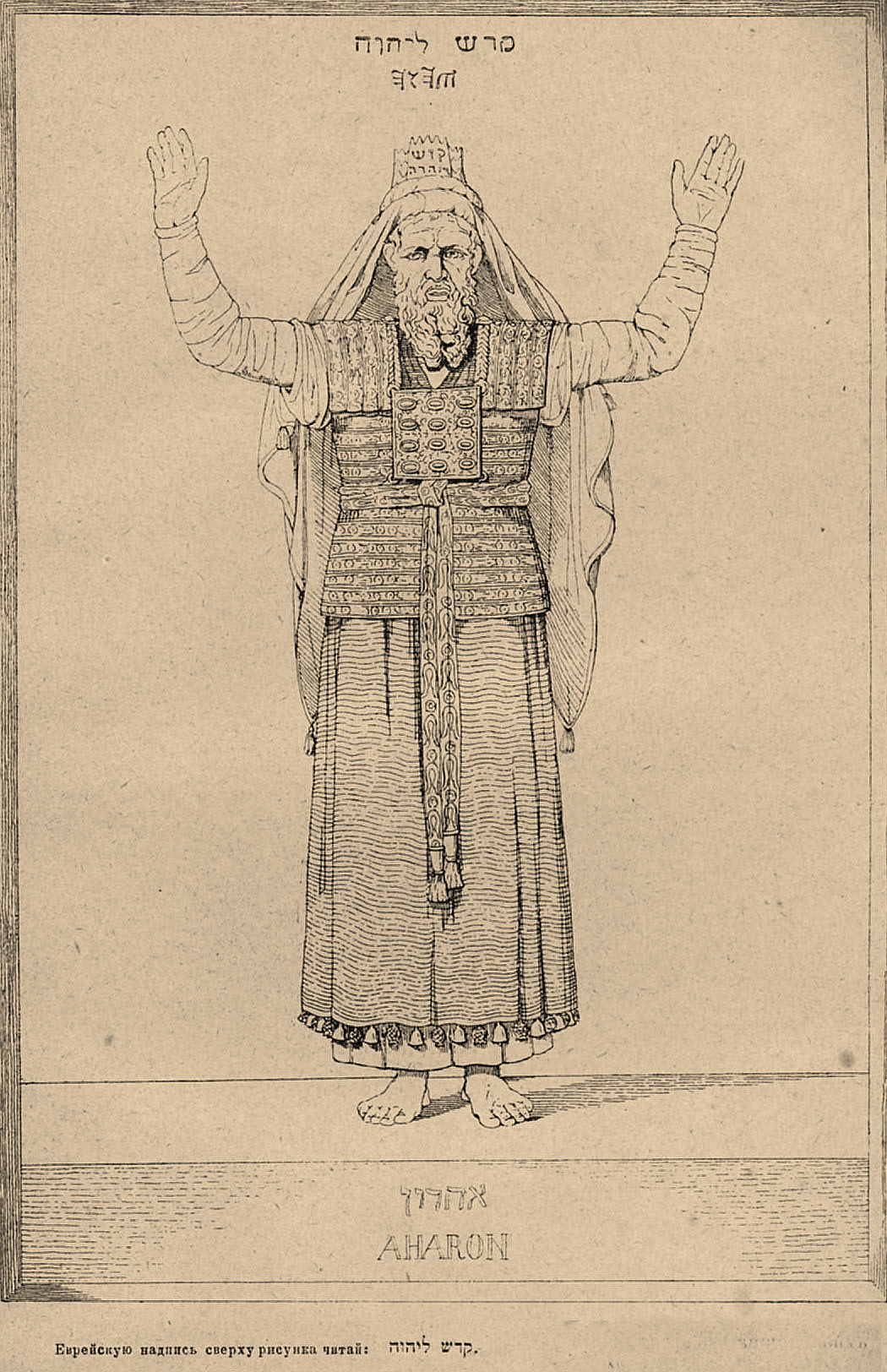
Aaron blessing (illustration from the 1906–1913 Jewish Encyclopedia of Brockhaus and Efron)

A midrash taught that the Priestly Blessing in Numbers 6:22–27 follows immediately the laws of the nazirite in Numbers 6:1–21 to teach that God commanded that just as a nazirite must not taste wine, so the priests must not taste wine when they are about to bless Israel. And for a like reason, the priests do not lift their hands in blessing during the afternoon service because of the possibility of intoxication.

The Mishnah taught that to prevent a prayer leader from erring in prayer, the leader should not respond "amen" after the Priestly Blessing, because of the potential for confusion. And even if there is no priest other than the prayer leader, the leader should not lift the leader's hands to bless the congregation, lest the leader become confused. If, however, the leader is certain that the leader can lift the leader's hands and resume the prayer without becoming confused, the leader may recite the Priestly Blessing.

Rav Havivi (or some say Rav Assi) of Hozna'ah said to Rav Ashi that a Tanna taught that Aaron first said the Priestly Blessing of Numbers 6:22–27 on "the first month of the second year, on the first day of the month" (Exodus 40:17, the first of Nisan), the same day that Moses erected the Tabernacle (as reported in Numbers 7:1), and the same day that the princes brought their first offerings (as reported in Numbers 7:2–3). A Tanna taught that the first of Nisan took ten crowns of distinction by virtue of the ten momentous events that occurred on that day. The first of Nisan was: (1) the first day of the Creation (as reported in Genesis 1:1–5), (2) the first day of the princes' offerings (as reported in Numbers 7:10–17), (3) the first day for the priesthood to make the sacrificial offerings (as reported in Leviticus 9:1–21), (4) the first day for public sacrifice, (5) the first day for the descent of fire from Heaven (as reported in Leviticus 9:24), (6) the first for the priests' eating of sacred food in the sacred area, (7) the first for the dwelling of the Shechinah in Israel (as implied by Exodus 25:8), (8) the first for the Priestly Blessing of Israel (as reported in Leviticus 9:22, employing the blessing prescribed by Numbers 6:22–27), (9) the first for the prohibition of the high places (as stated in Leviticus 17:3–4), and (10) the first of the months of the year (as instructed in Exodus 12:2).

The Mishnah taught that the priests recited the Priestly Blessing of Numbers 6:24–26 every day.

The Mishnah taught that in the province of Judea outside the Temple, the priests would say the Priestly Blessing as three blessings, but in the Temple, they would say it as one single blessing. In the Temple, the priests would pronounce the Name of God as it is written, but outside the Temple they would say its substituted form. In the province, the priests raised their hands at the height of their shoulders, but in the Temple, the priests raised their hands above their heads, except the High Priest, who did not raise his hands higher than the frontlet on his forehead. Rabbi Judah said that even the High Priest raised his hands higher than the frontlet, as Leviticus 9:22 reports, “And Aaron lifted up his hands toward the people and blessed them.”

A midrash taught that great is peace, for the world could not be maintained except by peace, and the Torah is wholly peace, as Proverbs 3:17 says, "Her ways are ways of pleasantness, and all her paths are peace." The reading of the Shema concludes (in the Evening, Maariv, Prayer Service) with the words: "He spreads the tabernacle of peace over His people." The Amidah prayer concludes with peace. And the Priestly Blessing of Numbers 6:24–26 concludes in Numbers 6:26 with peace. Rabbi Simeon ben Ḥalafta observed that there is no vessel that holds a blessing save peace, as Psalm 29:11 says, "The Lord will give strength to His people; the Lord will bless His people with peace."

In a baraita, Rabbi Ishmael interpreted Numbers 6:23, "In this way you shall bless the children of Israel," to report the priests' blessing of Israel, and Rabbi Ishmael interpreted Numbers 6:27, "And I will bless them," to mean that God then blesses the priests. Rabbi Akiva, however, interpreted Numbers 6:27, "And I will bless them," to mean that when the priests bless Israel, God affirms their blessing of Israel. The Gemara explained that according to Rabbi Akiva's position, the priests also receive a blessing according to the teaching of Rav Naḥman bar Isaac, who deduced from God's promise to Abraham in Genesis 12:3, "And I will bless them that bless you," that since the priests bless Abraham's descendants with the Priestly Blessing of Numbers 6:23–27, God therefore blesses the priests.

A midrash interpreted the Priestly Blessing of Numbers 6:24, "The Lord bless you and keep you," to mean that God bless you with wealth and guard that you may perform good deeds with it. Rabbi Nathan interpreted it to mean may God bless you with regards to your possessions and guard you with regard to your person.

Rabbi Isaac asked whether those blessed are not automatically guarded, and those guarded are not blessed. Rabbi Isaac thus interpreted "guard you" to mean from the Evil Inclination, that it not drive you out of the world. Another midrash interpreted "guard you" to mean that others have no dominion over you. Another midrash interpreted "The Lord . . . keep you" to pray that God would keep the covenant that God made with Israel's forefathers, as Deuteronomy 7:12 says, "The Lord your God shall keep with you the covenant . . . ." Another midrash interpreted "keep you" to mean that God will keep your soul at the hour of death.

A midrash interpreted the Priestly Blessing of Numbers 6:25, "The Lord make His face to shine upon you," to mean that God will give you light of the Shechinah.

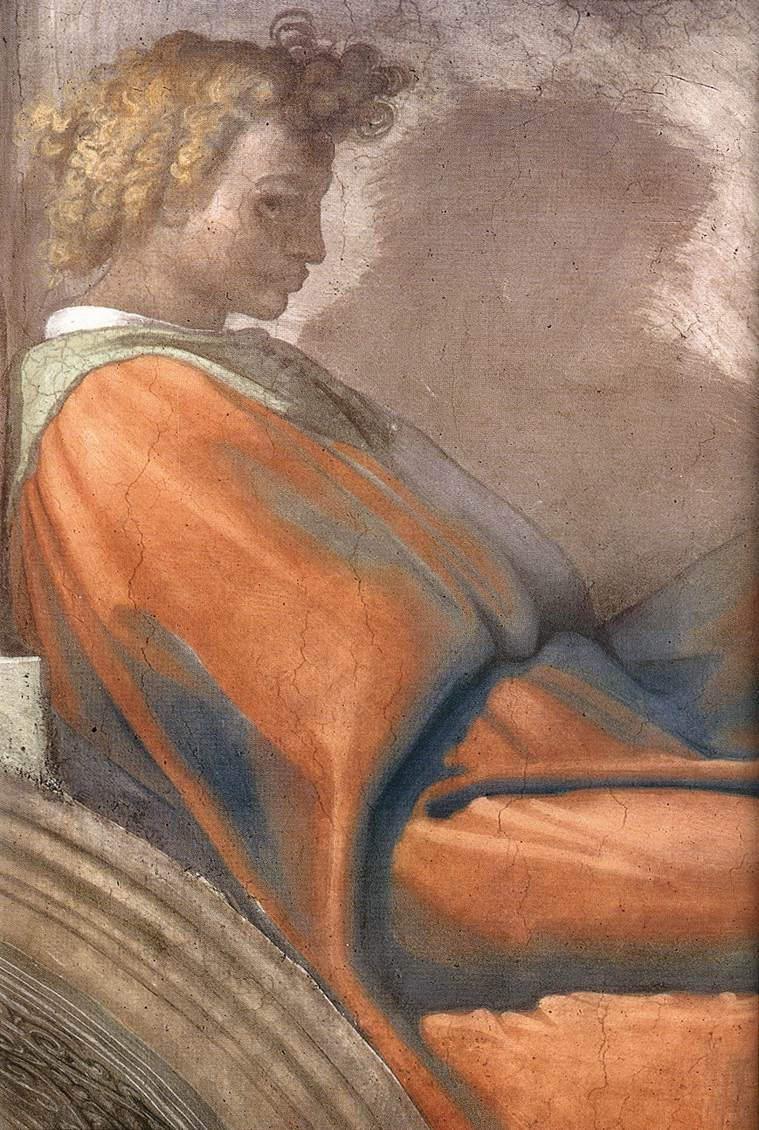
Naḥshon ben Amminadav (1511–1512 fresco by Michelangelo in the Sistine Chapel)

=== Numbers chapter 7 ===
A midrash told an account in connection with God's words in Numbers 7:7, "My servant Moses is . . . is trusted in all My house." The Sages told that when Moses came down from Mount Sinai, he saw Aaron beating the Golden Calf into shape with a hammer. Aaron intended to delay the people until Moses came down, but Moses thought that Aaron was participating in the sin and was incensed with him. So God told Moses that God knew that Aaron's intentions were good. The midrash compared this to a prince who became mentally unstable and started digging to undermine his father's house. His tutor told him not to weary himself but to let him dig. When the king saw it, he said that he knew the tutor's intentions were good and declared that the tutor would rule over the palace. Similarly, when the Israelites told Aaron in Exodus 32:1, "Make us a god," Aaron replied in Exodus 32:1, "Break off the golden rings that are in the ears of your wives, of your sons, and of your daughters, and bring them to me." And Aaron told them that since he was a priest, they should let him make it and sacrifice to it, all with the intention of delaying them until Moses could come down. So God told Aaron that God knew Aaron's intention, and that only Aaron would have sovereignty over the sacrifices that the Israelites would bring. Hence in Exodus 28:1, God told Moses, "And bring near Aaron your brother, and his sons with him, from among the children of Israel, that they may minister to Me in the priest's office." The midrash told that God told this to Moses several months later in the Tabernacle itself when Moses was about to consecrate Aaron to his office. Rabbi Levi compared it to the friend of a king who was a member of the imperial cabinet and a judge. When the king was about to appoint a palace governor, he told his friend that he intended to appoint the friend's brother. So God made Moses superintendent of the palace, as Numbers 7:7 reports, "My servant Moses is . . . is trusted in all My house," and God made Moses a judge, as Exodus 18:13 reports, "Moses sat to judge the people." And when God was about to appoint a High Priest, God notified Moses that it would be his brother Aaron.

The midrash concluded that when Numbers 31:6 reports that "Moses sent . . . Phinehas the son of Eleazar the priest to the war with the holy vessels," it refers to the Ark of the Covenant, to which Numbers 7:9 refers when it says, "the service of the holy things." But Rabbi Joḥanan deduced from the reference of Exodus 29:29 to "the holy garments of Aaron" that Numbers 31:6 refers to the priestly garments containing the Urim and Thummim.

Rabbi Simeon bar Abba in the name of Rabbi Joḥanan taught that every time Scripture uses the expression "and it was" (וַיְהִי, vayechi), it intimates the coming of either trouble or joy. If it intimates trouble, there is no trouble to compare with it, and if it intimates joy, there is no joy to compare with it. Rabbi Samuel bar Naḥman made a distinction: In every instance where Scripture employs “and it was” (vayechi), it introduces trouble, while when Scripture employs “and it shall be” (vehayah), it introduces joy. The Sages raised an objection to Rabbi Samuel's view, noting that to introduce the offerings of the princes, Numbers 7:12 says, "And he that presented his offering . . . was (vayeḥi)," and surely that was a positive thing. Rabbi Samuel replied that the occasion of the princes' gifts did not indicate joy, because it was manifest to God that the princes would join with Korah in his dispute (as reported in Numbers 16:1–3). Rabbi Judah ben Rabbi Simon said in the name of Rabbi Levi ben Parta that the case could be compared to that of a member of the palace who committed a theft in the bathhouse, and the attendant, while afraid of disclosing his name, nevertheless made him known by describing him as a certain young man dressed in white. Similarly, although Numbers 16:1–3 does not explicitly mention the names of the princes who sided with Korah in his dispute, Numbers 16:2 nevertheless refers to them when it says, "They were princes of the congregation, the elect men of the assembly, men of renown," and this recalls Numbers 1:16, "These were the elect of the congregation, the princes of the tribes of their fathers . . . ," where the text lists their names. They were the "men of renown" whose names were mentioned in connection with the standards; as Numbers 1:5–15 says, "These are the names of the men who shall stand with you, of Reuben, Elizur the son of Shedeur; of Simeon, Shelumiel the son of Zurishaddai . . . ."

The Sifra taught that the goat of the sin-offering about which Moses inquired in Leviticus 10:16 was the goat brought by Naḥshon ben Amminadav, as reported in Numbers 7:12, 16.

A Midrash taught that Naḥshon ben Aminadab was called that name because he was the first to plunge into the wave (נַחשׁוֹל, naḥshol) of the Reed Sea. And Rabbi Simeon bar Yoḥai said that God told Moses that because Naḥshon sanctified God's Name by the sea, he would get to be the first to present his offering in the newly constructed Tabernacle, as reported in Numbers 7:12.

Noting the similarity of language between "This is the sacrifice of Aaron" in Leviticus 6:13 and "This is the sacrifice of Naḥshon the son of Amminadab" and each of the other princes of the 12 tribes in Numbers 7:17–83, the Rabbis concluded that Aaron's sacrifice was as beloved to God as the sacrifices of the princes of the 12 tribes.

A midrash taught that the length of the Tabernacle courtyard reported in Exodus 27:18 at 100 cubits added to the length of the Tabernacle—30 cubits—to total 130 cubits. And the midrash taught that this number was alluded to when (as Numbers 7:37 reports) the prince of the Tribe of Simeon brought an offering of "one silver dish, the weight of which was 130 shekels." The midrash taught that the dish was an allusion to the court that encompassed the Tabernacle as the sea encompasses the world.

Rabbi Phinehas ben Yair taught that the 60 rams, 60 goats, and 60 lambs that Numbers 7:88 reports that the Israelites sacrificed as a dedication-offering of the altar symbolized (among other things) the 60 cities of the region of Argob that Deuteronomy 3:4 reports the Israelites conquered.

Rabbi Azariah in the name of Rabbi Judah ben Rabbi Simon taught that the mode of conversation between God and Moses in the tent of meeting reported in Numbers 7:89 reflected that Israel had outgrown the infancy of its nationhood. Rabbi Azariah in the name of Rabbi Judah ben Rabbi Simon explained in a parable. A mortal king had a daughter whom he loved exceedingly. So long as his daughter was small, he would speak with her in public or in the courtyard. When she grew up and reached puberty, the king determined that it no longer befit his daughter's dignity for him to converse with her in public. So he directed that a pavilion be made for her so that he could speak with his daughter inside the pavilion. In the same way, when God saw the Israelites in Egypt, they were in the childhood of their nationhood, as Hosea 11:1 says, "When Israel was a child, then I loved him, and out of Egypt I called My son." When God saw the Israelites at Sinai, God spoke with them as Deuteronomy 5:4 says, "The Lord spoke with you face to face." As soon as they received the Torah, became God's nation, and said (as reported in Exodus 24:7), "All that the Lord has spoken will we do, and obey," God observed that it was no longer in keeping with the dignity of God's children that God should converse with them in the open. So God instructed the Israelites to make a Tabernacle, and when God needed to communicate with the Israelites, God did so from the Tabernacle. And thus Numbers 7:89 bears this out when it says, "And when Moses went into the tent of meeting that He might speak with him."

== In medieval Jewish interpretation ==
The parashah is discussed in these medieval Jewish sources:

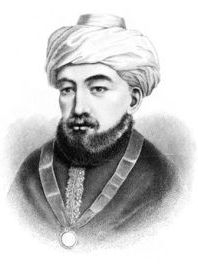
Maimonides

=== Numbers chapter 4 ===
Numbers 4:21–33 refers to duties of the Levites. Maimonides and the siddur report that the Levites would recite the Psalm for the Day in the Temple.

=== Numbers chapter 5 ===
Maimonides read Numbers 5:5–7 to teach that if a person violates any one of the commandments of the Torah (whether positive or negative, intentionally or erroneously), when the person repents and turns away from the sinful way, the person is obliged to confess before God. Maimonides taught that one makes such a confession by saying: "I beseech You, O Great Name! I have sinned; I have been obstinate; I have committed profanity against You, particularly in doing thus and such. Now, I have repented and am ashamed of my actions; forever will I not relapse into this thing again." Maimonides taught that this is the elementary form of confession, but whoever elaborates in confessing is praiseworthy.

Maimonides called the ritual for the suspected wife in Numbers 5:11–31 "a miracle received in our nation by tradition" and compared it to the account of skin disease in Leviticus 13–15, which Maimonides noted all saw as a punishment for slander. Maimonides noted the evident good effect of such beliefs.

Maimonides taught that the greater the sin that a person committed, the lower was the species from which the person's sin-offering was brought. Thus, Maimonides argued that luxury and incense were absent from the offerings of the woman suspected of adultery because those who brought the offering were not proper in their deeds, and they were to be reminded by their offerings that they needed to repent, as if they had been told that their offering was without any ornamental addition on account of the wickedness of their deeds. As the sotah acted more disgracefully than a person who sinned in ignorance, her offering was of the lowest kind—of barley flour.

Maimonides noted that Numbers 5:15 calls the sotah's offerings "an offering of memorial, bringing iniquity to remembrance"—and not "a sweet savor to the Lord" (as Leviticus 1:9, for example, calls the burning of a burnt offering). Maimonides argued that this is because the burning of the sotah's sin offering symbolized that the sin for which the offering was brought was utterly removed and destroyed, like the offering that was being burnt; no trace of the sin would remain, as no trace was left of the offering, which was destroyed by fire. Because of the offering’s association with the sin, the smoke that the offering produced was not "a sweet savor to the Lord" but despised and abhorred.

Maimonides taught that if a man had engaged in forbidden relations during his adult life, the curse-bearing waters of Numbers 5:11–31 did not test his wife's fidelity. Even if he engaged in relations with his fiancé while she was living in her father's house (which the Rabbis prohibited) the waters did not test his wife's fidelity. Maimonides derived this from Numbers 5:31, which states: "The man will then be free of sin, and the woman will bear [the burden of] her sin." Maimonides taught that this verse implied that only when the man was "free of sin" would "the woman . . . bear [the burden of] her sin."

=== Numbers chapter 6 ===
==== The Nazirite ====
Maimonides taught that the purpose of the nazirite laws in Numbers 6:1–21 was to keep people away from wine—which ruined people. Maimonides wrote that the law in Numbers 6:4 prohibiting the nazirite from eating anything made from the grapevine as an additional precaution, implying that people must consume wine only as much as is necessary. For Numbers 6:5 calls those who abstain from drinking wine "holy"—equal to the sanctity of the High Priest—an honor given nazirites because they abstain from wine.

Maimonides taught that nazirite vows must be observed even after the destruction of the Temple. Therefore, when a person takes a nazirite vow in the present era, that person must observe it forever, because there is no Temple where the person can go to offer sacrifices at the conclusion of the nazirite vow. Maimonides wrote that a nazirite vow may be observed only in the Land of Israel (as the Sages decreed that the Diaspora conveys ritual impurity, and a nazirite thus cannot observe the vow there). A person who takes a nazirite vow in the Diaspora is penalized and obligated to go to the Land of Israel and observe the nazirite vow there for the length of the vow. Accordingly, a person who takes a nazirite vow in the Diaspora in the present era is compelled to go to the Land of Israel and observe the nazirite vow there until death or until the Temple is rebuilt. (Abraham ben David (The Ra'avad), however, questioned what purpose would be served by going to the Land of Israel in the present era, as all are impure, even there, because of contact with a human corpse (or the impurity that results from a corpse) and there are no ashes from a red heifer with which we can purify ourselves. Hence, the Ra'avad concluded that it is forbidden to take a nazirite vow in the present era, whether in the Diaspora or in the Land of Israel.) Maimonides taught that throughout the entire time that a nazirite is in the Diaspora, the nazirite is forbidden to drink wine, to become impure due to contact with the dead, and to get a haircut. The nazirite must uphold all the requirements stemming from a nazirite vow, even though the days do not count in the Diaspora. The nazirite who transgresses by drinking wine, cutting hair, or touching a corpse would be liable for lashes. Maimonides wrote that a person who says, "I will be a nazirite if I do this and this" or "if I do not do this or this" is a wicked person. But Maimonides argued that a person who takes a nazirite vow to God in a holy manner is delightful and praiseworthy, for concerning this, Numbers 6:7–8 says, "The diadem of his God is upon his head. . . . He is holy to God," and Scripture equates him with a prophet, as Amos 2:11 says, "And from your sons, I will raise [some] as prophets, and from your youths, [some] as nazirites."

But Maimonides also wrote that if one considers envy, desire, vainglory, and like as evil tendencies and resolves to separate oneself from them exceedingly and eschew meat, wine, marrying, comfortable quarters, comfortable clothes, and the like, such is an evil way and is forbidden. Maimonides wrote that one who follows this way is called a sinner. Therefore, the sages commanded that people must not deprive themselves of anything other than the things of which the Torah deprives them, nor shall they bind themselves by vows and oaths to abstain from things that are permitted.

==== The Priestly Blessing ====
Notwithstanding Esau's conflicts with Jacob in Genesis 25–33, the Baal HaTurim, reading the Priestly Blessing of Numbers 6:24–26, noted that the numerical value (gematria) of the Hebrew word for "peace" (שָׁלוֹם, shalom) equals the numerical value of the word "Esau" (עֵשָׂו, Eisav). The Baal HaTurim concluded that this hints at the Mishnaic dictum (in Avot 4:15) that one should always reach out to be the first to greet any person, even an adversary.

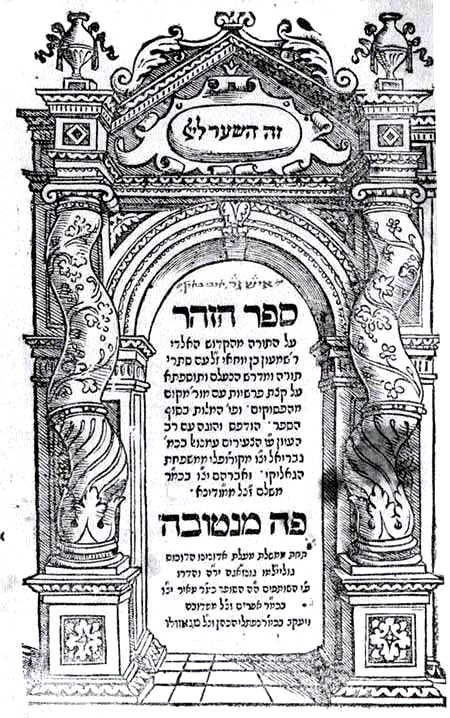
The Title Page of the Zohar

The Zohar found in the Priestly Blessing components of God's essential Name. In the Zohar, Rabbi Simeon taught from the Book of Mystery that the Divine Name has both a revealed and a concealed form. In its revealed form, it is written as the four-letter Name of God, the Tetragrammaton, but in its undisclosed form it is written in other letters, and this undisclosed form represents the most Recondite of all. In the Zohar, Rabbi Judah taught that even the revealed form of the Name is hidden under other letters (as the name ADoNaY, אֲדֹנָי, is hidden within ADNY, אדני) to screen the most Recondite of all. In the letters of God's Name are concealed 22 attributes of Mercy, namely, the 13 attributes of God in Exodus 34:6–7 and nine attributes of the Mikroprosopus, the lesser revealed aspect of God. They all combine in one composite Name. When people were more reverent, the priests openly spoke the Name in the hearing of all, but after irreverence became widespread, the Name became concealed under other letters. When the Name was disclosed, the priest would concentrate his mind on its deep and inner meaning, and he would utter the Name in such a way as to accord with that meaning. But when irreverence became common in the world, he would conceal all within the written letters. The Zohar taught that Moses uttered the 22 letters in two sections, first in Exodus 34:6–7 in the attributes of God, and second in Numbers 14:18, when he uttered nine attributes of Mercy that are inherent in the Mikroprosopus, and which are radiated from the light of God. All this the priest combined when he spread forth his hands to bless the people pursuant to Numbers 6:23–26, so that all the worlds received God's blessings. It is for this reason that Numbers 6:23 says simply "saying" (אָמוֹר, amor), instead of the imperative form "say" (אִמְרִי, imri), in a reference to the hidden letters within the words of the Priestly Blessing. The word אָמוֹר, amor has in its letters the numerical value of 248 minus one (א equals 1; מ equals 40; ו equals 6; ר equals 200; and 1 + 40 + 6 + 200 = 247), equal to the number of a man's bodily parts, excepting the one part on which all the rest depend. All these parts thus receive the Priestly Blessing as expressed in the three verses of Numbers 6:24–26.

Maimonides read the references in the Priestly Blessing to God's face (פָּנָיו, panav) to signify "attention and regard."

== In modern interpretation ==
The parashah is discussed in these modern sources:

=== Numbers chapter 5 ===
Amy Kalmanofsky said that Numbers 5:11–31 has elicited a wide range of reactions, from viewing the ritual to be unforgivably misogynistic, demonstrating women's vulnerability and men's privileged position in Israelite society, to believing that the ritual worked to protect accused women.

Jacob Milgrom said that the priestly legislator used the ordeal of Numbers 5:11–31 to remove jurisdiction over and punishment of the suspected adulteress from human hands and thereby guarantee that she would not be put to death.

Tamara Cohn Eskenazi said that the Torah makes no mention of, and provides no procedure for, the man whom the husband necessarily must have suspected of having been with his wife.

Sharon Keller said Numbers 5:28 means that an innocent wife would be able to maintain her pregnancy. Keller saw the sotah ritual as involving a pregnant woman whose husband suspected that he was not the father. Keller said that within the context of Numbers 5:11–31, an intact pregnancy after the ritual proved that the husband had indeed fathered the child.

Ishay Rosen Zvi said that the Mishnaic Sotah ritual was never practiced in the manner the Mishnah prescribed.

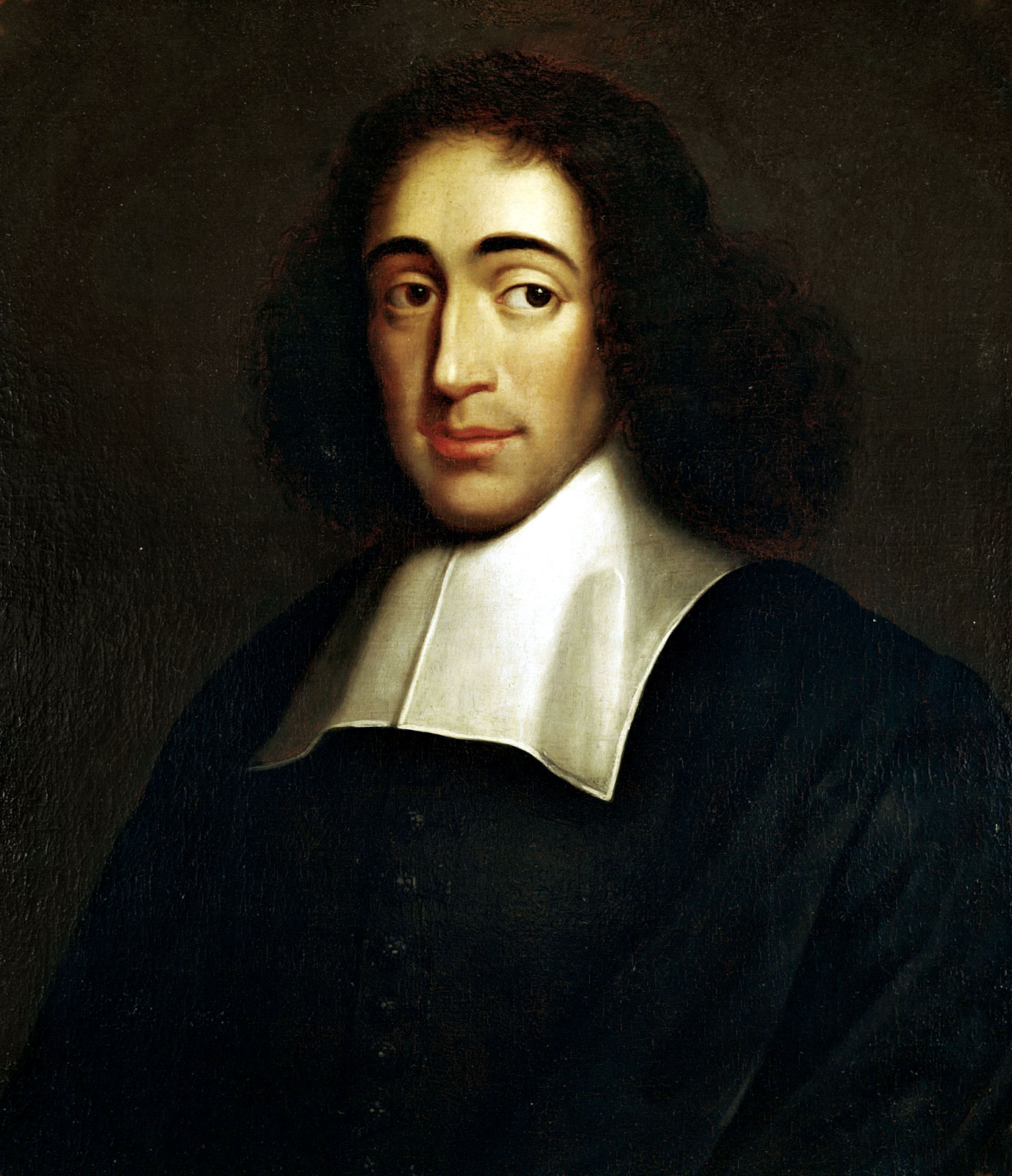
Spinoza

=== Numbers chapter 6 ===
Baruch Spinoza read Genesis 14:18–20 to relate that Melchizedek was king of Jerusalem and priest of the Highest God, that in the exercise of his priestly functions—like those Numbers 6:23 describes—he blessed Abraham, and that Abraham gave to this priest of God a tithe of all his spoils. Spinoza deduced from this that before God founded the Israelite nation, God constituted kings and priests in Jerusalem and ordained for them rites and laws. Spinoza deduced that while Abraham sojourned in the city, he lived scrupulously according to these laws, for Abraham had received no special rites from God; and yet Genesis 26:5 reports that he observed the worship, precepts, statutes, and laws of God, which Spinoza interpreted to mean the worship, statutes, precepts, and laws of king Melchizedek.

Diagram of the Documentary Hypothesis

== In critical analysis ==
Some scholars who follow the Documentary Hypothesis attribute all of the text of the parashah to the Priestly source who wrote in the 6th or 5th century BCE.

== Commandments ==
According to Sefer ha-Chinuch, there are 7 positive and 11 negative commandments in the parashah.

- To send the impure from the Temple
- Impure people must not enter the Temple.
- To repent and confess wrongdoings
- To fulfill the laws of the sotah
- Not to put oil on the sotah's meal offering
- Not to put frankincense on the sotah's meal offering
- The nazarite must not drink wine, wine mixtures, or wine vinegar.
- The nazarite must not eat fresh grapes.
- The nazarite must not eat raisins.
- The nazarite must not eat grape seeds.
- The nazarite must not eat grape skins.
- The nazarite must not cut his or her hair.
- The nazarite must let his or her hair grow.
- The nazarite must not be under the same roof as a corpse.
- The nazarite must not come into contact with the dead.
- The nazarite must shave after bringing sacrifices upon completion of the nazirite period.
- The Kohanim must bless the Jewish nation daily.
- The Levites must transport the ark on their shoulders.

== In the liturgy ==
Reuven Hammer noted Mishnah Tamid recorded what was in effect the first siddur, as a part of which priests daily recited the Priestly Blessing of Numbers 6:24–26.

Many Jews recite the Priestly Blessing, Numbers 6:24–26, as the first section of the Torah to which they turn after reciting the Blessings of the Torah in the morning. And the Priestly Blessing is reflected in the closing prayer for peace of the Amidah prayer in each of the three prayer services.

== Haftarah ==
The haftarah for the parashah is Judges 13:2–25, which is about the birth of Samson, the nazirite.

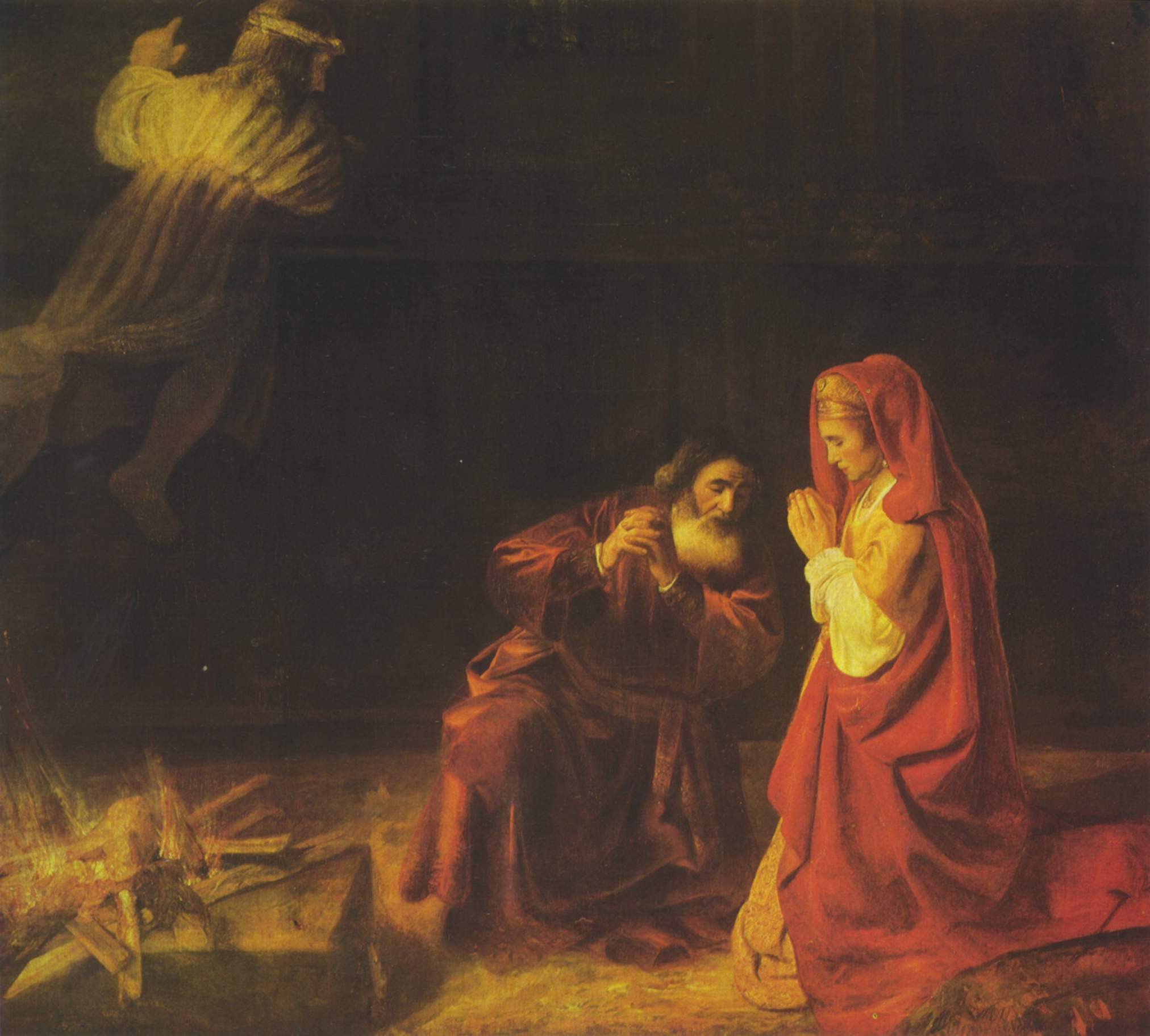
The Offer of Manoah (1641 painting by Rembrandt)

=== Summary of the haftarah ===
Manoah's wife was barren, but an angel of the Lord appeared and told her that she would bear a son. The angel warned her not to drink wine or strong drink or eat any unclean thing, and foretold that no razor would come upon her son's head, for he would be nazirite from birth and would begin to save Israel from the Philistines.

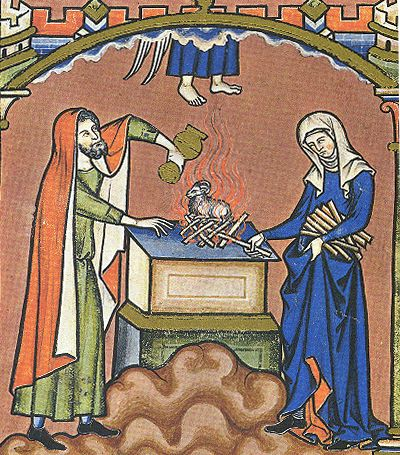
Manoah and his wife sacrifice to God (painting from the 1250 Morgan Bible)

Manoah was told by his wife what happened, and Manoah entreated God to let the man of God come again and teach them what to do. God heeded Manoah and sent the angel to the woman as she sat alone in the field. Manoah's wife ran and told Manoah, and he followed her to the angel, and asked him whether he was the one who had spoken to his wife, and he said that he was. Manoah asked the angel how they should raise the child, and the angel told him that they should do what he had told Manoah's wife: She was not to eat any product of the grapevine, drink wine or strong drink, or eat any unclean thing.

Manoah asked the angel to stay so that they could serve him a meal. But the angel told Manoah that even if he stayed, he would not eat, and if they wanted to make a burnt-offering, they should offer it to God. Manoah did not recognize that he was an angel, and asked him for his name so that when his prophecy proved true, they could honor him. But the angel asked why Manoah asked for his name, as it was hidden.

So Manoah offered to God a young goat and a meal-offering, and as the flame went up off the altar toward heaven, the angel ascended in the flame and disappeared, and Manoah and his wife fell on their faces, as Manoah realized that he was an angel. Manoah told his wife that they would surely die, as they had seen God, but she replied that if God had wanted to kill them, God would not have received the burnt-offering or shown them what God did.

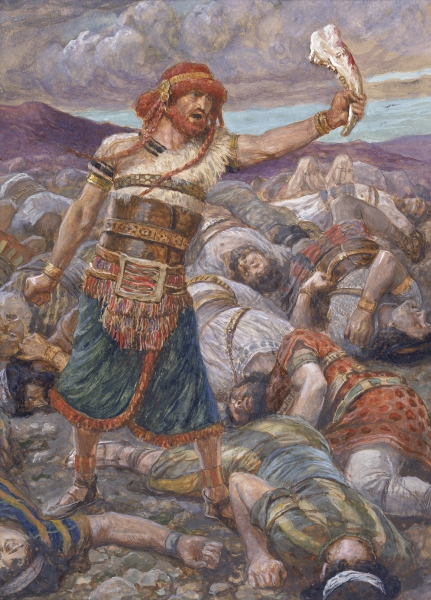
Samson Slays a Thousand Men (watercolor circa 1896–1902 by James Tissot)

And the woman bore a son and called him Samson, and the child grew, and God blessed him, and the God's spirit began to move him in Mahaneh-dan, between Zorah and Eshtaol.

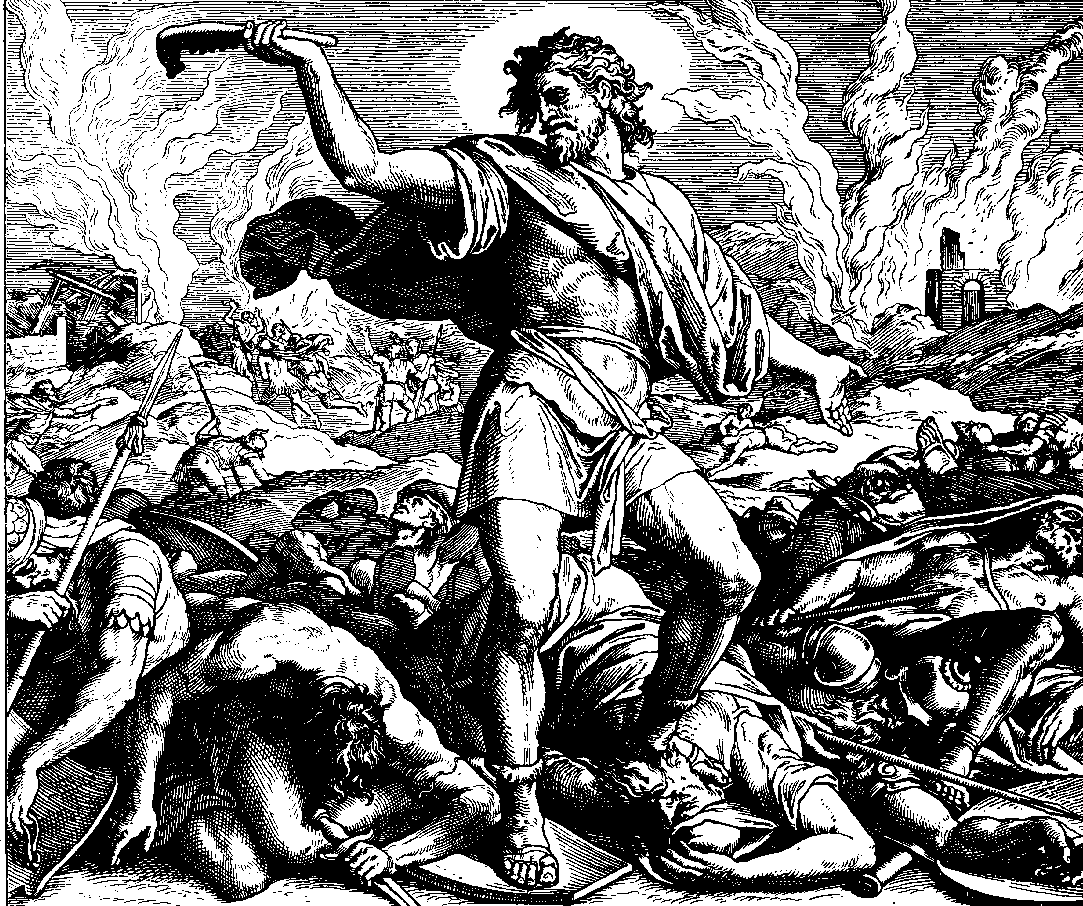
Samson killed a thousand men with the jawbone of an ass (woodcut by Julius Schnorr von Carolsfeld from the 1860 Die Bibel in Bildern)

=== Connection between the haftarah and the parashah ===
Both the parashah and the haftarah relate to the nazirite status.

Both the parashah and the haftarah speak of abstention from "wine and strong drink." And both the parashah and the haftarah note that "no razor shall come upon his head."

The parashah and the haftarah do differ, however, about some aspects of the nazirite status. While the parashah addresses one voluntarily becoming a nazirite, the haftarah speaks of one committed by another to nazirite status from birth. And while the parashah contemplates the nazirite period ending, the haftarah envisions a lifetime commitment.

In his career after the haftarah, Samson proceeded to violate each of the three nazirite prohibitions. He apparently consumed intoxicants, frequently came in contact with the dead, and ultimately allowed his hair to be cut.

=== The haftarah in classical rabbinic interpretation ===
The Gemara taught that Samson's mother was named Zelelponith. The Gemara taught that the oral tradition passed along this fact to provide a reply to the heretics (should they ask why the written Torah does not supply the name of the mother of such an important figure).
