= Birkot HaTorah =

Birkot HaTorah (Hebrew: ברכות התורה, “blessings of the Torah”) are blessings concerning the giving of the Torah to Israel that are recited before Torah study during Birkot HaShachar of the daily morning prayer service (Shacharit) of Judaism, as mandated by Halakha. According to the Shulchan Aruch, reciting the blessings is obligatory before studying the Tanakh, Midrash, Mishnah, or Gemara. It is also customary to recite them prior to any Torah study that will be taught that day.

== The order of the blessings ==
The Torah blessings are structured as a series of three sections:

1. In the first part, one recites according to the regular wording of the blessing of any mitzvah: One blesses God, who sanctified Jews with His mitzvot and commanded Jews to occupy themselves with the study of Torah.
2. Next, one requests success in the subsequent Torah study: One requests that the Torah, which God is traditionally understood to have given Israel to alone, "be pleasant" to the student; that one should merit learning it with purpose; and that one and one's descendants understand the depth of its content.
3. After the second blessing, another is recited as thanksgiving for God's giving the Torah to the people of Israel: One blesses and thanks God for choosing the Jews from among all peoples to receive His Torah.
4. The third blessing is also recited by individuals receiving an aliyah to the Torah before its chanting in a given synagogue service.

== The importance of Birkot HaTorah ==
In the Talmud, it is written that one of the reasons for the destruction of the Land of Israel is to know a Rav, the one who studied Torah without first blessing the Birkot HaTorah. Rabbi's explanation is an interpretation of the verse in the book of Jeremiah, which describes God answering the question "Why the Land of Israel was destroyed?":

Is anybody so wise as to understand this? To whom has GOD's mouth spoken, so that it can be related: Why is the land in ruins, laid waste like a wilderness, with none passing through?

The destruction of the land, according to Jeremiah, is linked to the abandonment of the Torah. Rav emphasizes the need for both "they left my Torah" and "did not follow it," indicating they failed to bless before studying.

== Thought as speech ==
In tractate Berakhot, the Amoraim were divided as to whether contemplation (i.e., thought) should be considered speech. According to Rav Chisda, thought is not considered speech; the evidence for this is that an unclean person is not allowed to say holy things, yet the unclean person should think about the words of the food blessing in their mind. Hence, a thought is not considered speech; as such, people must ponder the sacred so that they will not be idle from sacred words while others are engaged in blessings of praise.

Some Talmudists, like Ravina II (and possibly Ravina I), considered thought to be speech. As the Mishnah commands a person to ponder the words of the blessing of food, the thought must be speech. Against this, as this mitzvah requires only that the body be pure when speaking sacred words, the duty to maintain a pure body is only when speaking of holiness and not in contemplation.
