= Samson =

Important character from the Book of Judges of the Hebrew Bible

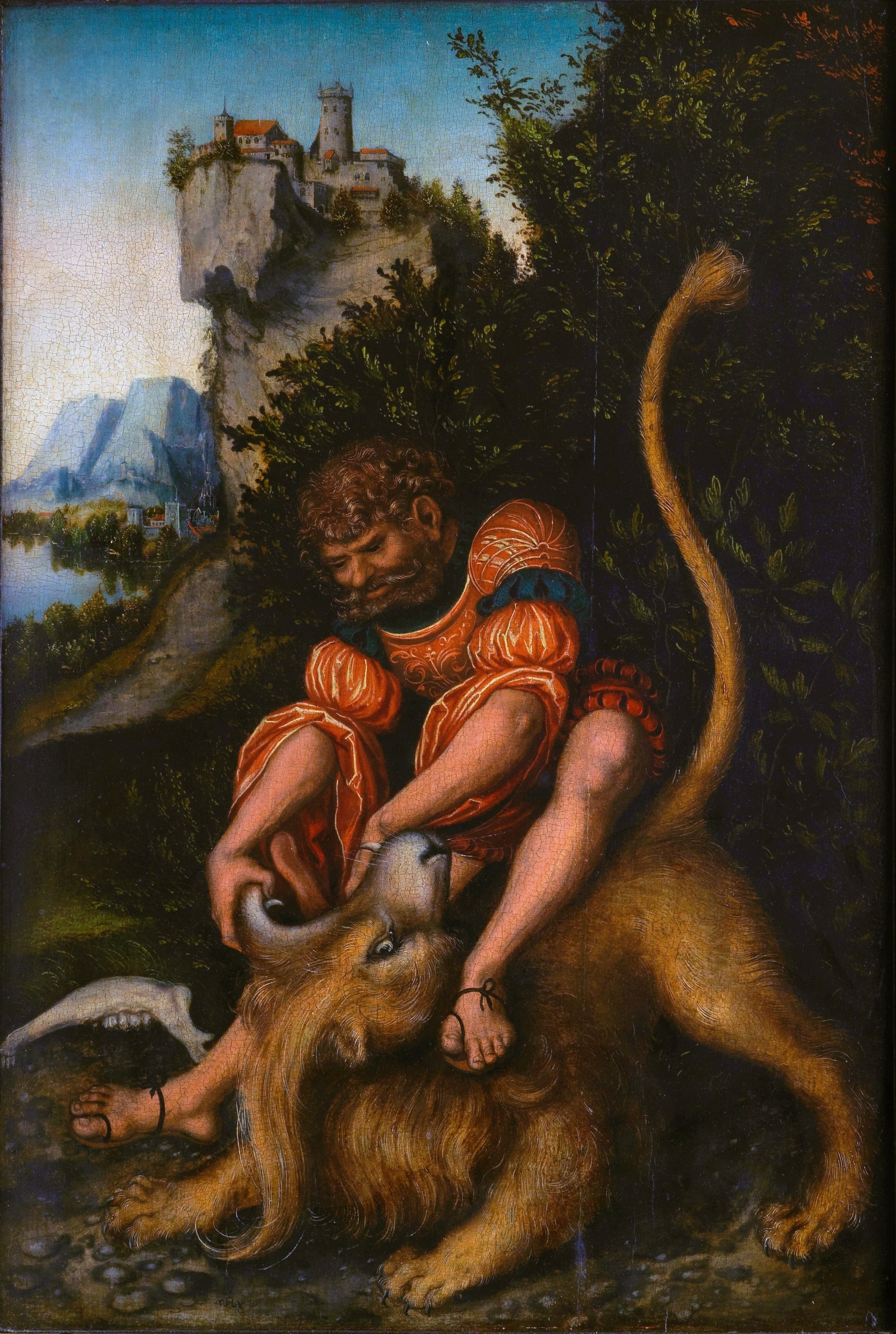
- Samson's Fight with the Lion (1525) by Lucas Cranach the Elder
- Resting place: Zorah, Nahal Sorek
- Predecessor: Abdon
- Successor: Eli
- Partner: Delilah
- Parents: Manoah (father); not named (mother)

Samson (/ˈsæmsən/; Hebrew: שִׁמְשׁוֹן, romanized: Šimšōn, lit. 'man of the sun') (Note: Greek: Σαμψών, romanized: Sampsṓn. In English, the transliteration Sampson is also sometimes used for his name.) was the last of the judges of the ancient Israelites mentioned in the Book of Judges (chapters 13 to 16) and one of the last leaders who "judged" the twelve tribes of Israel before the institution of the monarchy. He is sometimes regarded as an Israelite version of the popular Near Eastern folk hero archetype also embodied by the Sumerian Gilgamesh and Enkidu, as well as the Greek Heracles. Samson was given superhuman powers by God in the form of extreme strength.

The biblical account states that Samson was a Nazirite and that he was given immense strength to aid him against his enemies and allow him to perform superhuman feats, including slaying a lion with his bare hands and massacring a Philistine army with a donkey's jawbone. The cutting of Samson's long hair would violate his Nazirite vow and nullify his ability.

Samson is betrayed by his lover Delilah, who, sent by Philistine officials to entice him, orders a servant to cut his hair while he is sleeping and turns him over to the Philistines, who gouged out his eyes and forced him to mill grain at Gaza. While there, his hair begins to grow again. When the Philistines take Samson into their temple of Dagon, Samson asks to rest against one of the support pillars. After being granted permission, he prays to God and miraculously recovers his strength, allowing him to bring down the columns – collapsing the temple and killing both himself and the Philistines.

Samson has been the subject of Christian, rabbinic and Islamic commentary, with some Christians viewing him as a type of Jesus, based on similarities between their lives. Notable depictions of Samson include John Milton's closet drama Samson Agonistes and Cecil B. DeMille's 1949 Hollywood film Samson and Delilah. Samson also plays a major role in Western art and traditions. Samson's narrative also inspired modern military and political lingo, including Israel's nuclear strategy "Samson Option" and units like Samson's Foxes.

== Biblical narrative ==
=== Birth ===
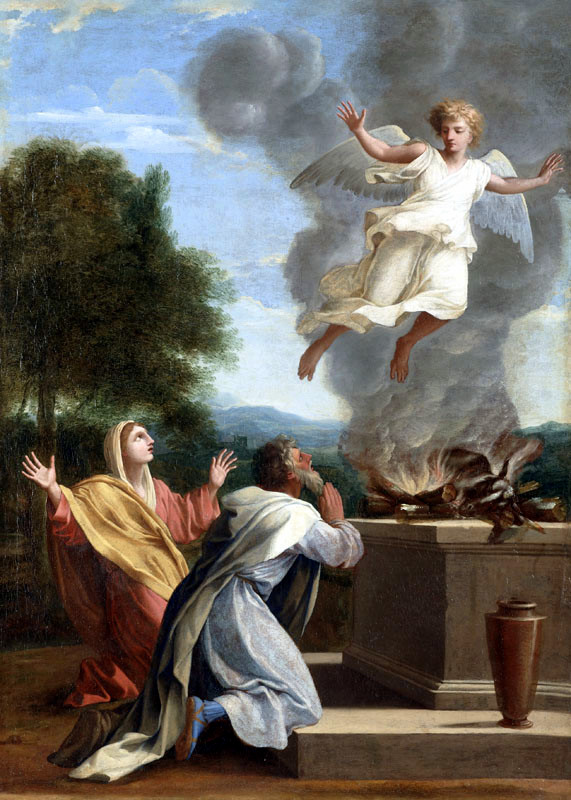
The Sacrifice of Manoah (1640–1650) by Eustache Le Sueur

According to the account in the Book of Judges, Samson lived during a time of repeated conflict between Israel and Philistia, when God was disciplining the Israelites by giving them "into the hand of the Philistines". Manoah was an Israelite from Zorah, descended from the Danites, and his wife had been unable to conceive. The Angel of the Lord appears to Manoah's wife and proclaims that the couple would soon have a son who would begin to deliver the Israelites from the Philistines.

The Angel of the Lord states that Manoah's wife was to abstain from all alcoholic drinks, unclean foods, and her promised child was not to shave or cut his hair. He was to be a Nazirite from birth. In ancient Israel, those wanting to be especially dedicated to God for a time could take a Nazirite vow which included abstaining from wine and spirits, not cutting hair or shaving, and other requirements. Manoah's wife believes the Angel of the Lord; her husband was not present, so he prays and asks God to send the messenger once again to teach them how to raise the boy who is going to be born.

After the Angel of the Lord returns, Manoah asks him his name, but he says, "Why do you ask my name? It is beyond understanding." Manoah then prepares a sacrifice, but the Angel of the Lord will only allow it to be for God. He touches it with his staff, miraculously engulfing it in flames, and then ascends into the sky in the fire. This is such dramatic evidence of the nature of the Messenger that Manoah fears for his life, since it was said that no one could live after seeing God. However, his wife convinces him that, if God planned to slay them, he would never have revealed such things to them. In due time, their son Samson is born, and he is raised according to the angel's instructions.

=== Marriage to a Philistine ===
When he is a young adult, Samson leaves the hills of his people to see the cities of Philistia. He falls in love with a Philistine woman from Timnah, whom he decides to marry, ignoring the objections of his parents over the fact that she is not an Israelite. In the development of the narrative, the intended marriage is shown to be part of God's plan to strike at the Philistines.

According to the biblical account, Samson is repeatedly seized by the "Spirit of the Lord", who blesses him with immense strength. The first instance of this is seen when Samson is on his way to ask for the Philistine woman's hand in marriage, when he is attacked by a lion. He simply grabs it and rips it apart, as the spirit of God divinely empowers him. However, Samson keeps it a secret, not even mentioning the miracle to his parents. He arrives at the Philistine's house and becomes betrothed to her. He returns home, then comes back to Timnah some time later for the wedding. On his way, Samson sees that bees have nested in the carcass of the lion and made honey. He eats a handful of the honey and gives some to his parents.

At the wedding feast, Samson tells a riddle to his thirty groomsmen (all Philistines). If they can solve it, he will give them thirty pieces of fine linen and garments, but if they cannot they must give him thirty pieces of fine linen and garments. The riddle is a veiled account of two encounters with the lion, at which only he was present:

Out of the eater came something to eat.
Out of the strong came something sweet.

The Philistines are infuriated by the riddle. The thirty groomsmen tell Samson's new wife that they will burn her and her father's household if she did not discover the answer to the riddle and tell it to them. At the urgent and tearful imploring of his bride, Samson gives her the solution, and she passes it on to the thirty groomsmen.

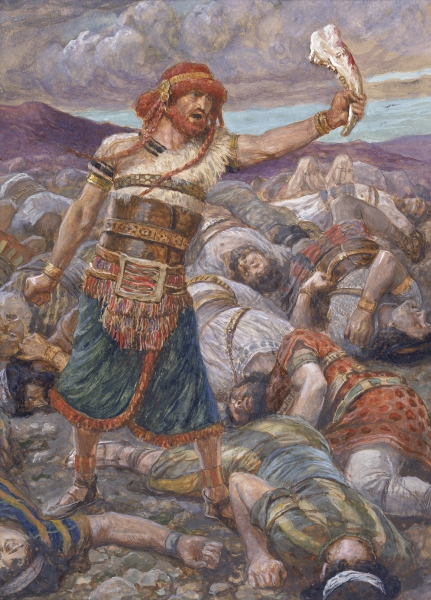
Samson Slays a Thousand Men with the Jawbone of an Ass (c. 1896–1902) by James Tissot

Before sunset on the seventh day, they say to him,

What is sweeter than honey?
and what is stronger than a lion?

Samson replies,

If you had not plowed with my heifer,
you would not have solved my riddle.

Samson then travels to Ashkelon (a distance of roughly 30 miles) where he strikes down thirty Philistines for their garments; he then returns and gives those garments to his thirty groomsmen. In a rage, Samson returns to his father's house. The family of his bride instead give her to one of the groomsmen as wife. Some time later, Samson returns to Timnah to visit his wife, unaware that she is now married to one of his former groomsmen. But her father refuses to allow Samson to see her, offering to give Samson a younger sister instead.

Samson goes out, gathers 300 foxes, and ties them together in pairs by their tails. He then attaches a burning torch to each pair of foxes' tails and turns them loose in the grain fields and olive groves of the Philistines. The Philistines learn why Samson burned their crops and burn Samson's wife and father-in-law to death in retribution.

In revenge, Samson slaughters many Philistines, saying, "I have done to them what they did to me." Samson then takes refuge in a cave in the rock of Etam. An army of Philistines go to the tribe of Judah and demand that 3,000 men of Judah deliver them Samson. With Samson's consent, given on the condition that the Judahites would not kill him themselves, they tie him with two new ropes and are about to hand him over to the Philistines when he breaks free of the ropes. Using the jawbone of an ass, he kills 1,000 Philistines.

=== Delilah ===
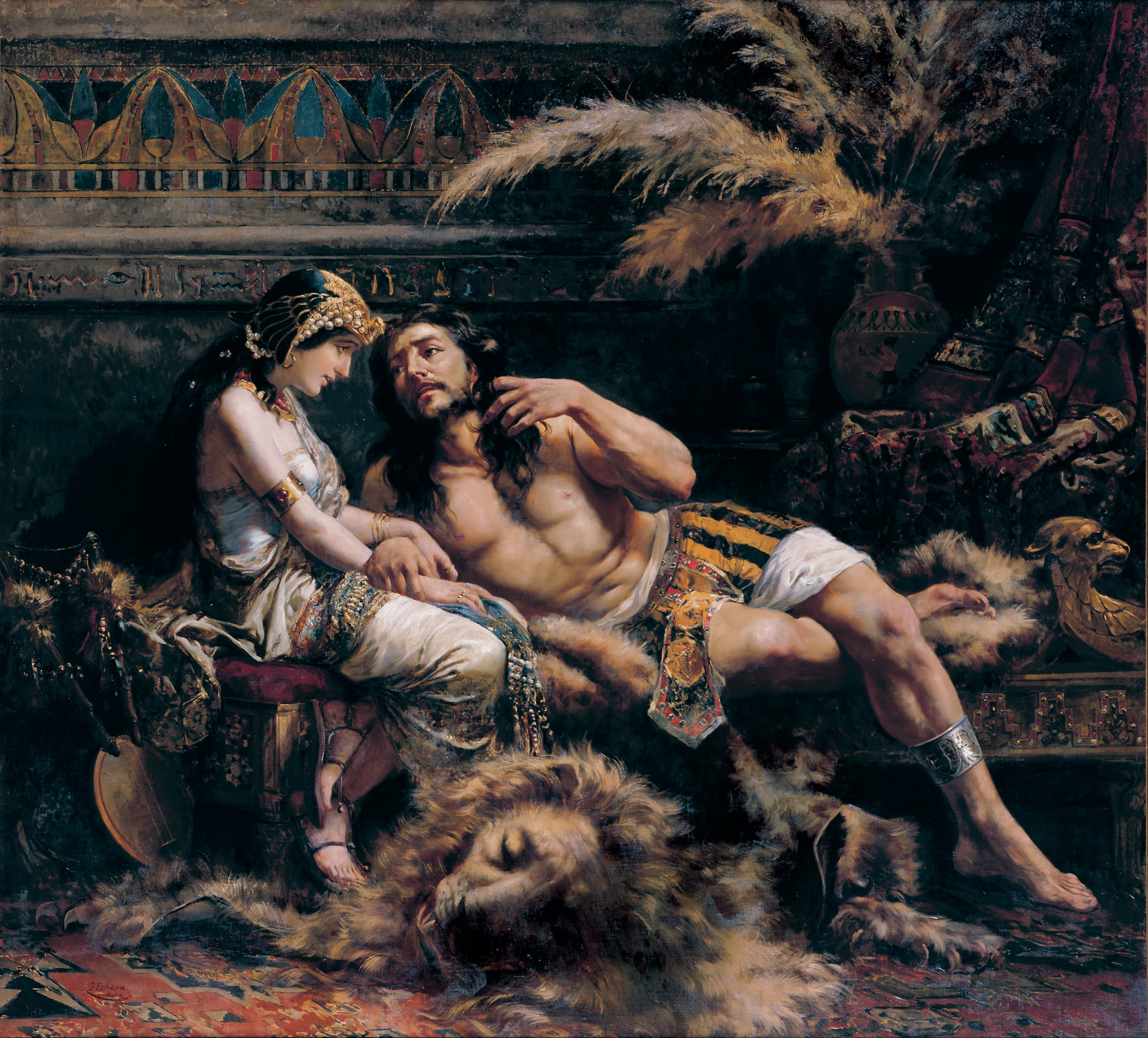
Samson and Delilah (1887) by Jose Etxenagusia

Later, Samson travels to Gaza, where he sees a prostitute (Hebrew: אִשָּׁ֣ה זוֹנָ֔ה) and visits her. His enemies wait at the gate of the city to ambush him, but he tears the gate from its very hinges and frame and carries it to "the hill that is in front of Hebron".

He then falls in love with Delilah in the valley of Sorek. The Philistines approach Delilah and induce her with 1,100 pieces of silver to find the secret of Samson's strength so that they can capture their enemy, but Samson refuses to reveal the secret and teases her, telling her that he will lose his strength if he is bound with fresh bowstrings. She does so while he sleeps, but when he wakes up he snaps the strings. She persists, and he tells her that he can be bound with new ropes. She ties him up with new ropes while he sleeps, and he snaps them, too. She asks again, and he says that he can be bound if his locks are woven into a weaver's loom. She weaves them into a loom, but he simply destroys the entire loom and carries it off when he wakes.

Delilah, however, persists and Samson finally capitulates and tells Delilah that God supplies his power because of his consecration to God as a Nazirite, symbolized by the fact that a razor has never touched his head and that if his hair is cut off the vow would be broken and he would lose his strength. Delilah then woos him to sleep "in her lap" and calls for a servant to cut his hair. Samson loses his strength and he is captured by the Philistines, who blind him by gouging out his eyes. They then take him to Gaza, imprison him, and put him to work turning a large millstone and grinding grain.

=== Death ===
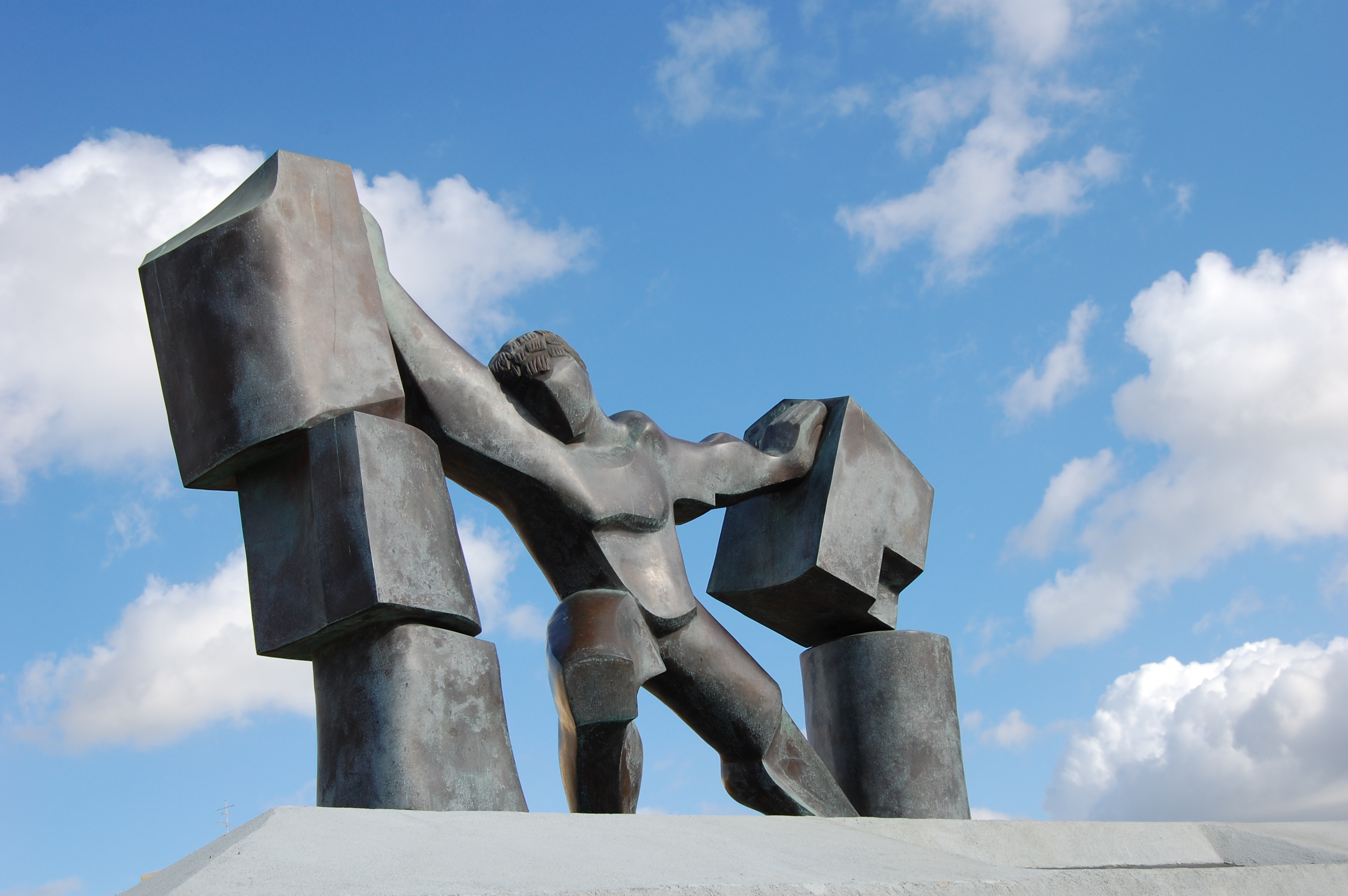
Statue in Ashdod

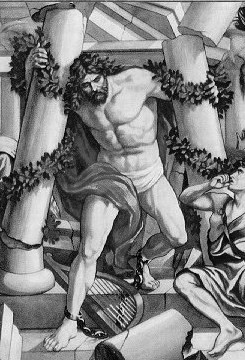
Bible illustration

According to the biblical narrative, Samson died when he grasped two pillars of the Temple of Dagon and "bowed himself with all his might" (Judges 16:30, KJV). This has been variously interpreted as Samson pushing the pillars apart (left) or pulling them together (right).

One day, the Philistine leaders assemble in a temple for a religious sacrifice to Dagon, one of their most important deities, for having delivered Samson into their hands. They summon Samson so that people can watch him perform for them. The temple is so crowded that people are even climbing onto the roof to watch – and all the rulers of the entire government of Philistia have gathered there too, some 3,000 people in all. Samson is led into the temple, and he asks his captors to let him lean against the supporting pillars to rest. However, while in prison his hair had begun to grow again. He prays for strength and God gives him strength to break the pillars, causing the temple to collapse, killing him and the people inside.

After his death, Samson's family recovered his body from the rubble and buried him near the tomb of his father Manoah. A tomb structure which some attribute to Samson and his father stands on the top of the mountain in Tel Tzora, although a separate tradition passed down by the traveler Isaac Chelo in 1334 alleges that Samson was buried at the monument known as al-Jārib in Sheikh Abū Mezār, a village (now ruin) located near Tel Beit Shemesh. Near the village there used to be shown a hewn rock, known as Qal'at al-mafrazah, on whose top and sides are quarried different impressions and thought to be the altar built by Manoah. At the conclusion of Judges 16, it is said that Samson had "judged" Israel for twenty years.

== Interpretations ==
=== Archaeology ===
In August 2012, archaeologists from Tel Aviv University announced the discovery of a circular stone seal, approximately 15 mm (0.59 in) in diameter, which was found on the floor of a house at Beth Shemesh and appears to depict a man, possibly long-haired, next to the sketchy depiction of a large animal resembling contemporary images of lions. The seal is dated to the 11-12th century BCE. According to Haaretz, "excavation directors Prof. Shlomo Bunimovitz and Dr. Zvi Lederman of Tel Aviv University say they do not suggest that the human figure on the seal is the biblical Samson. Rather, the geographical proximity to the area where Samson lived, and the time period of the seal, show that a story was being told at the time of a hero who fought a lion, and that the story eventually found its way into the biblical text and onto the seal". The human figure appears to be unarmed, which would correspond to the Samson story.

=== Rabbinic literature ===
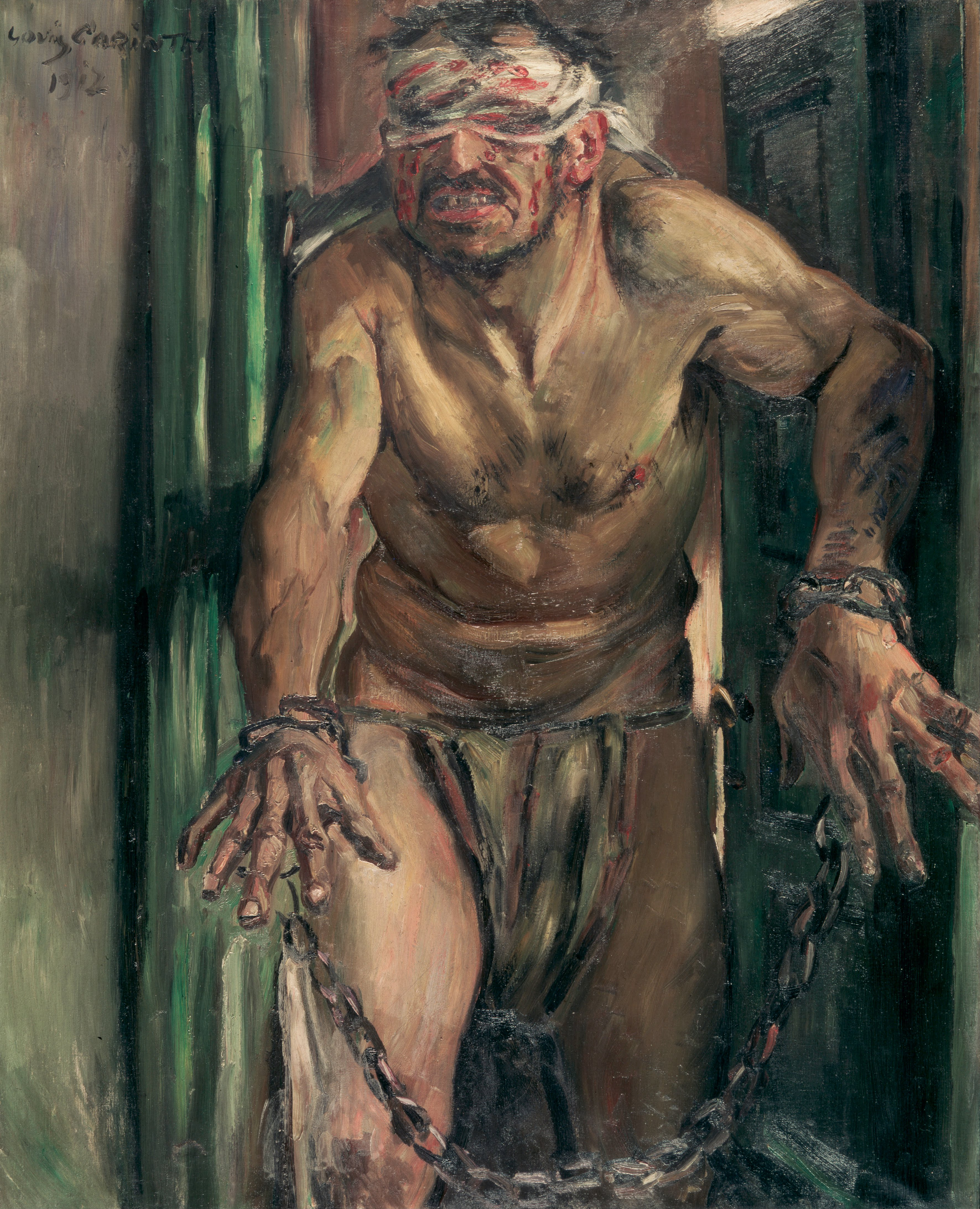
The Blinded Samson (1912) by Lovis Corinth

Rabbinic literature identifies Samson with Bedan, a Judge mentioned by Samuel in his farewell address (1 Samuel 12:11) among the Judges who delivered Israel from their enemies. However, the name "Bedan" is not found in the Book of Judges. The name "Samson" is derived from the Hebrew word šemeš, which means "sun", so that Samson bore the name of God, who is called "a sun and shield" in Psalms 84:12; and as God protected Israel, so did Samson watch over it in his generation, judging the people even as did God. Samson's strength was divinely derived (Talmud, Tractate Sotah 10a).

Jewish legend records that Samson's shoulders were sixty cubits broad. Many Talmudic commentaries, however, explain that this is not to be taken literally, for a person that size could not live normally in society; rather, it means that he had the ability to carry a burden 60 cubits wide (approximately 30 meters) on his shoulders. He was lame in both feet but, when the spirit of God came upon him, he could step with one stride from Zorah to Eshtaol, while the hairs of his head arose and clashed against one another so that they could be heard for a like distance. Samson was said to be so strong that he could uplift two mountains and rub them together like two clods of earth, yet his superhuman strength, like Goliath's, brought woe upon its possessor.

In licentiousness, he is compared with Amnon and Zimri, both of whom were punished for their sins. Samson's eyes were put out because he had "followed them" too often. (As his eyes led him astray by lust, this was the reason he was blinded.) It is said that, in the twenty years during which Samson judged Israel, he never required the least service from an Israelite, and he piously refrained from taking the name of God in vain. Therefore, as soon as he told Delilah that he was a Nazarite of God, she immediately knew that he had spoken the truth. When he pulled down the temple of Dagon and killed himself and the Philistines, the structure fell backward so that he was not crushed, his family being thus enabled to find his body and to bury it in the tomb of his father.

In the Talmudic period, some seem to have denied that Samson was a historical figure, regarding him instead as a purely mythological personage. This was viewed as heretical by the rabbis of the Talmud, and they attempted to refute this. They named Hazzelelponi as his mother in Numbers Rabbah Naso 10 and in Bava Batra 91a and stated that he had a sister named "Nishyan" or "Nashyan".

=== Christian interpretations ===
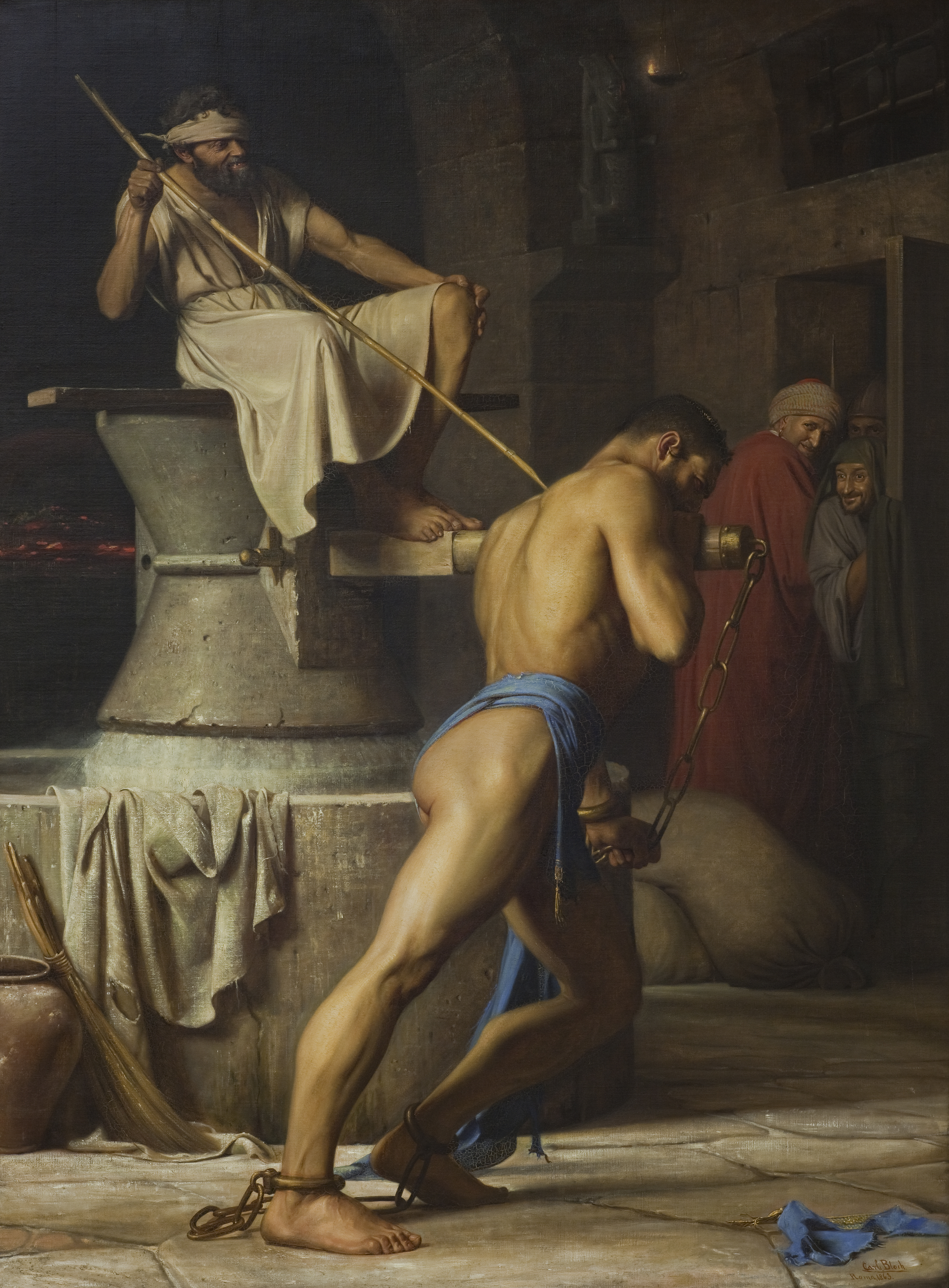
Samson in the Treadmill (1863) by Carl Bloch

Samson's story has also garnered commentary from a Christian perspective; the Epistle to the Hebrews praises him for his faith. Ambrose, following the portrayal of Josephus and Pseudo-Philo, represents Delilah as a Philistine prostitute, and declares that "men should avoid marriage with those outside the faith, lest, instead of love of one's spouse, there be treachery." Caesarius of Arles interpreted Samson's death as prefiguring the crucifixion of Jesus, remarking: "Notice here an image of the cross. Samson extends his hands spread out to the two columns as to the two beams of the cross." He also equates Delilah with Satan, who tempted Christ.

Following this trend, more recent Christian commentators have viewed Samson as a type of Jesus Christ, based on similarities between Samson's story and the life of Jesus in the New Testament. Samson's and Jesus' births were both foretold by angels, who predicted that they would save their people. Samson was born to a barren woman, and Jesus was born of a virgin. Samson defeated a lion; Jesus defeated Satan, whom the First Epistle of Peter describes as a "roaring lion looking for someone to devour". Samson's betrayal by Delilah has also been compared to Jesus' betrayal by Judas Iscariot; both Delilah and Judas were paid in pieces of silver for their respective deeds. Ebenezer Cobham Brewer notes in his A Guide to Scripture History: The Old Testament that Samson was "blinded, insulted [and] enslaved" prior to his death, and that Jesus was "blindfolded, insulted, and treated as a slave" prior to his crucifixion. Brewer also compares Samson's death among "the wicked" with Christ being crucified between two thieves.

=== Islamic literature ===
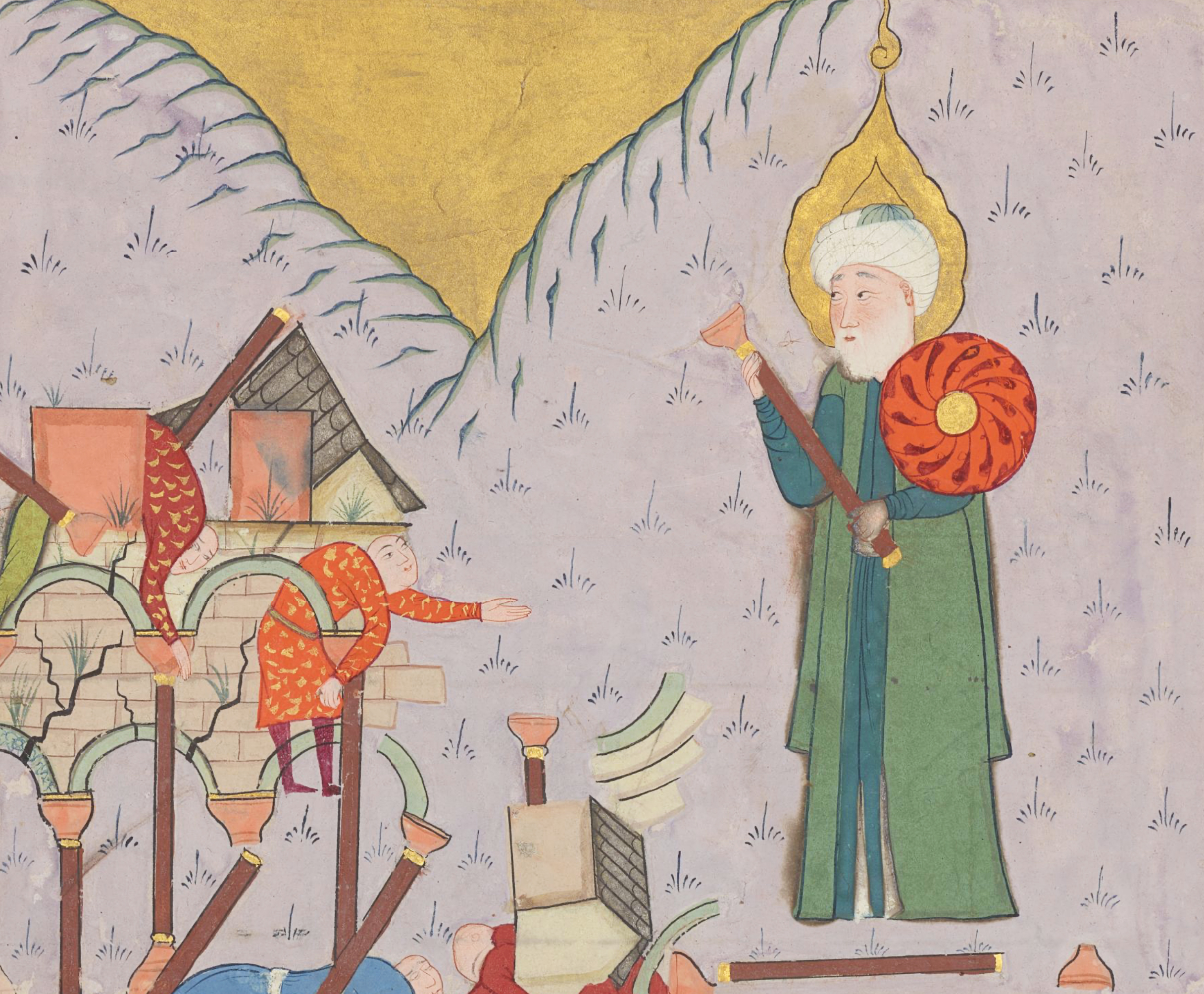
Islamic 1585–1590 illustration depicting Shamshun, collapsing a pagan temple by pulling away a column

The Quran and authentic hadith never mentions Samson by name and characteristics specifically. However, there are several non-canonical works of Quran exegesis and scholastic traditions among Islamic literature that mention Samson (Arabic: شمشون, romanized: Shamshūn), particularly in the study of tafsir.

Ibn Abi Hatim, a Hadith scholar and son of Abu Hatim Muhammad ibn Idris al-Razi, mentioned Samson in his exegesis by quoting the opinion of Mujahid ibn Jabr where he described Samson as "an Israelite who wore armor and struggling in the way of God for 1,000 months".

Al-Tabari and Abu Ishaq al-Tha'labi incorporated the biblical figure of Samson into the Quranic prophetic world. Al-Tabari in particular has given details in History of the Prophets and Kings by incorporating biblical narratives with the authority of Israʼiliyyat tradition from Wahb ibn Munabbih, that his mother gave birth to him after she made a nazar (vow) to God. Samson lived nearby a pagan society, where he actively raided their settlement alone, armed with a camel's jawbone and always obtained spoils of war from his successful raids. This tradition of al-Tabari was traced from one of his teacher, Muhammad ibn Hamid ar-Razi. This tradition by Muhammad ibn Hamid also recorded by al-Dhahabi through the records from Abu Dawud al-Sijistani, al-Tirmidhi, Ibn Majah, Tabari, and al-Baghawi. However, al-Dhahabi also reported that the tradition from Muhammad Ibn Hamid were deemed inauthentic or flawed narrator by Hadith experts such as Ya'qub ibn Syaibah and Muhammad al-Bukhari. Furthermore, Ibn Ishaq also criticize the transmitter whose Muhammad ibn Hamid received from, which was Salamah ibn al-Fadl. Ibn Ishaq deemed him as unreliable narrator who were notorious for narrating traditions without stating his sources.

Abu Ishaq al-Tha'labi featured al-Tabari's narration in his tafsir with more extensive details, where the nisba of Samson was "Shamsun ibn Masuh". Furthermore, Abu Ishaq added the raids of Samson against the pagan kingdom were happened for the span of 1,000 month and killed "thousands of infidels", where it became a proverb in the saying "better than a thousand months" for the Laylat al-Qadr (Night of Power) which believed by Muslims as a moment of night where every good deeds and faith observance multiplied for more than 1,000 months.

Ibn Kathir stated in his Tafsir Ibn Kathir that an episode in verses 3–4 of the surah al-Qadr of the Qur'an was about the lifetime of Samson, who goes to jihad (religious war) for the span of 1,000 month (83 years). Badr al-Din al-Ayni in his work Umdat al-Qari and Ahmad ibn Muhammad al-Thalabi in his Tafsir al-Tha'labi also associated Samson with this Qur'anic verse. Ahmad al-Thalabi also stated that Samson was one of the prophets and messengers in Islam and applied the honorific "Peace Be Upon Him" to him. Tha'labi traced his interpretation to Wahb ibn Munabbih.

=== Scholarly ===
==== Comparison with other religious and mythological figures ====
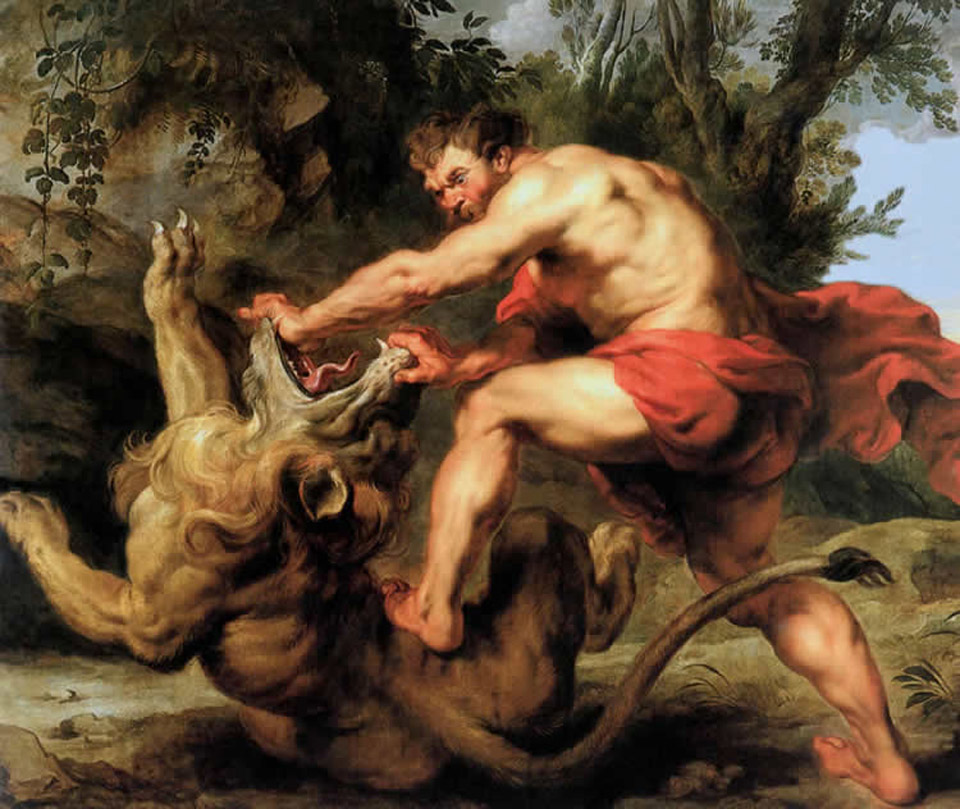
Samson Slaying the Lion (1628) by Peter Paul Rubens

Some modern academics have interpreted Samson as a solar deity, as a demi-god (such as Hercules or Enkidu, among others) somehow enfolded into Jewish religious lore, or as an archetypical folk hero. According to Jack M. Sasson, Samson would later be understood as a giant because of the size and function of the fortified city gates of Gaza. Furthermore, he describes the Biblical figure as a "comic hero", and argues the narrative does not demand historical validation, but to consider the possibility that such traditions include sharper lessons than those strictly derived from history.

In the late nineteenth and early twentieth centuries, some comparative mythologists interpreted Samson as a euhemerized solar deity, arguing that Samson's name is derived from Hebrew šemeš, meaning "Sun", and that his long hair might represent the Sun's rays. These solar theorists also pointed out that the legend of Samson is set within the general vicinity of Beth Shemesh, a village whose name means "Temple of the Sun". They argued that the name Delilah may have been a wordplay with the Hebrew word for night, layla, which "consumes" the day. Although this hypothesis is still sometimes promoted in scholarly circles such as by Robin Baker, it has generally fallen out of favor due to the superficiality of supporting evidence.

An interpretation far more popular among current scholars holds that Samson is a Hebrew variant of the same international Near Eastern folk hero which inspired the earlier Mesopotamian Enkidu and the later Greek Heracles (and, by extension, his Roman adaptation Hercules). Heracles and Samson both slew a lion bare-handed (the former killed the Nemean lion). Likewise, they were both believed to have once been extremely thirsty and drunk water which poured out from a rock, and to have torn down the gates of a city. They were both betrayed by a woman (Heracles by Deianira, Samson by Delilah), who led them to their respective dooms. Both heroes, champions of their respective peoples, die by their own hands: Heracles ends his life on a pyre; whereas Samson makes the Philistine temple collapse upon himself and his enemies. In this interpretation, the annunciation of Samson's birth to his mother is a censored account of divine conception. Robert Karl Gnuse posited that Samson moving two posts to the top of the hill may be inspired by the legend of Hercules erecting two pillars at the Strait of Gibraltar.

Samson also strongly resembles Shamgar, another hero mentioned in the Book of Judges, who, in Judges 3:31, is described as having slain 600 Philistines with an ox-goad.

Concerning the birth narrative of Samson, Marc Zvi Brettler argues that the Biblical text in Judges 13 subtly indicates that the angel of YHWH is Samson's actual father, and not Manoah, and thus he is conceived as a demigod.

==== Traditional views ====
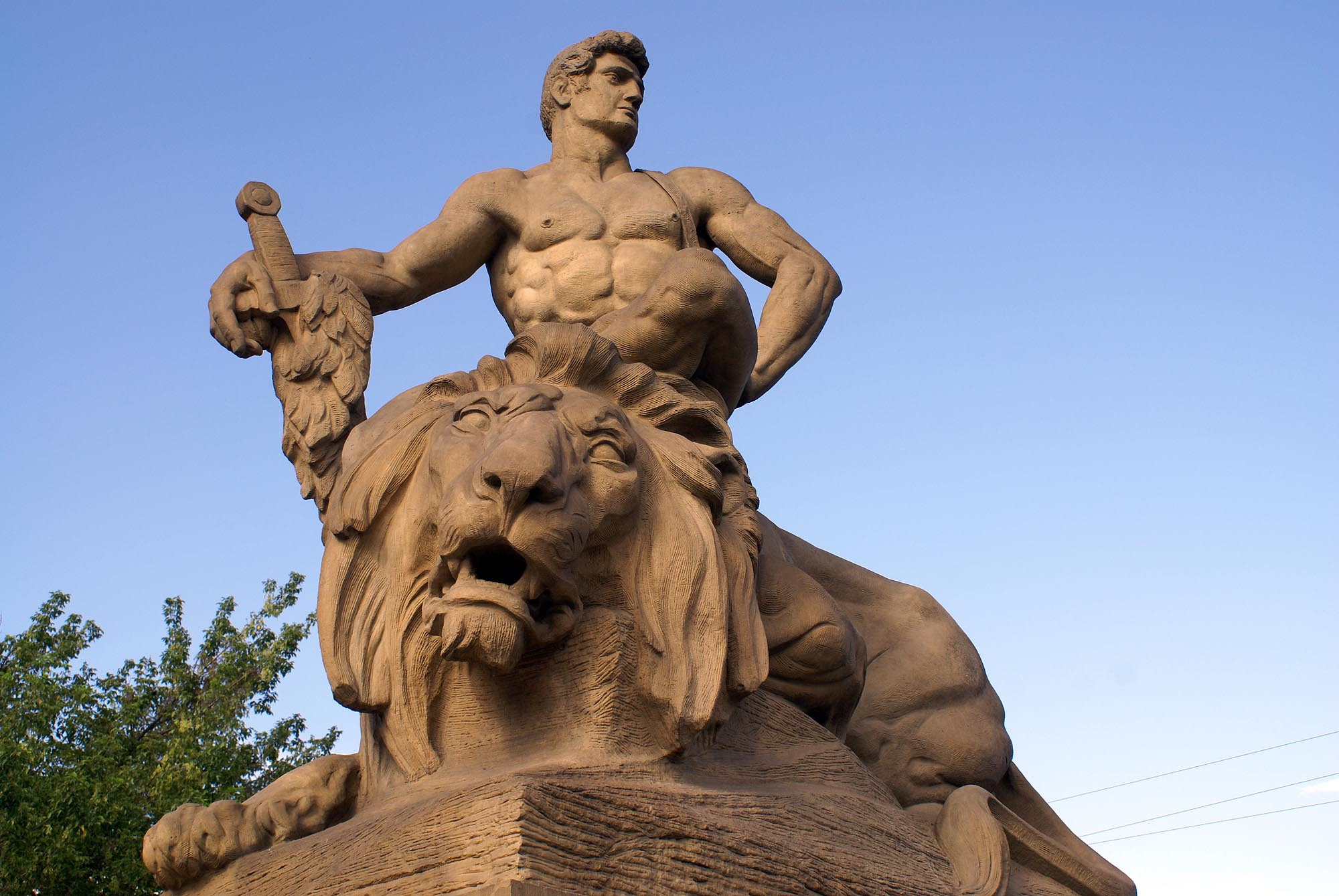
A monument of Samson in Wrocław, Poland

These views are disputed by traditional and conservative biblical scholars who consider Samson to be a literal historical figure and thus reject any connections to mythological heroes. The concept of Samson as a "solar hero" has been described as "an artificial ingenuity". Joan Comay, co-author of Who's Who in the Bible: The Old Testament and the Apocrypha, The New Testament, believes that the biblical story of Samson is so specific concerning time and place that Samson was undoubtedly a real person who pitted his great strength against the oppressors of Israel.

==== Religious and moral meaning or lack of it ====
In contrast, James King West considers that the hostilities between the Philistines and Hebrews appear to be of a "purely personal and local sort". He also considers that Samson stories have, in contrast to much of Judges, an "almost total lack of a religious or moral tone".

Conversely, Elon Gilad of Haaretz writes "some biblical stories are flat-out cautions against marrying foreign women, none more than the story of Samson". Gilad notes how Samson's parents disapprove of his desire to marry a Philistine woman and how Samson's relationship with Delilah leads to his demise. He contrasts this with what he sees as a more positive portrayal of intermarriage in the Book of Ruth.

=== Death by suicide ===
In Arabic language media, the story of Samson's suicide is often described as the first suicide attack. Multiple writers in English have also interpreted Samson's suicide and the associated killing of thousands of Philistines as a suicide attack, portrayed in a positive light by the text, and compared him to those responsible for the September 11 attacks.

The story of Samson, as told by John Milton in Samson Agonistes, was one of the examples of "Suicide bombers in Western literature" included in a study by Japanese-born German academic Arata Takeda. Takeda's article was published by Contemporary Justice Review. Takeda's other examples were Ajax, The Robbers, and The Just Assassins. He also covered the same concept in his thesis for doctorate from the University of Tübingen. His conclusion that "suicide bombings are not the expressions of specific cultural peculiarities or exclusively religious fanaticisms. Instead, they represent a strategic option of the desperately weak who strategically disguise themselves under the mask of apparent strength, terror, and invincibility".

Some Christians and Jews claim Samson committed an act of "self sacrifice" rather than suicide. Professor emeritus Claude Mariottini argues that Samson's suicide was an act of personal vengeance.

== Cultural influences ==
=== Cultural traditions ===
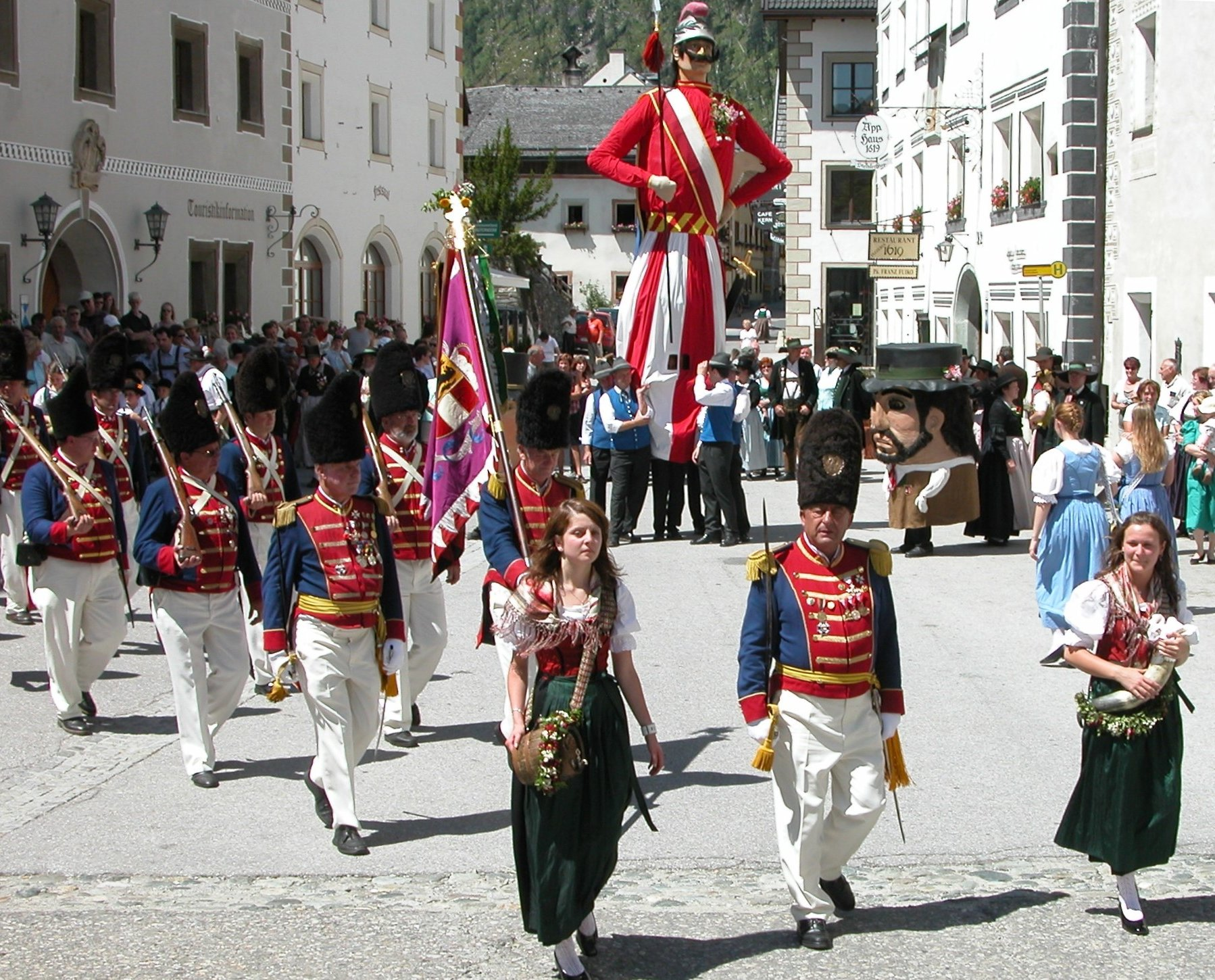
Samson parade Mauterndorf, Austria

Samson is the emblem of Lungau, Salzburg, and parades in his honor are held annually in ten villages of the Lungau and two villages in the north-west Styria (Austria). During the parade, a young bachelor from the community carries a massive figure made of wood or aluminum said to represent Samson. The tradition, which was first documented in 1635, was entered into the UNESCO list of Intangible Cultural Heritage in Austria in 2010.

=== References to Samson in media and the arts ===
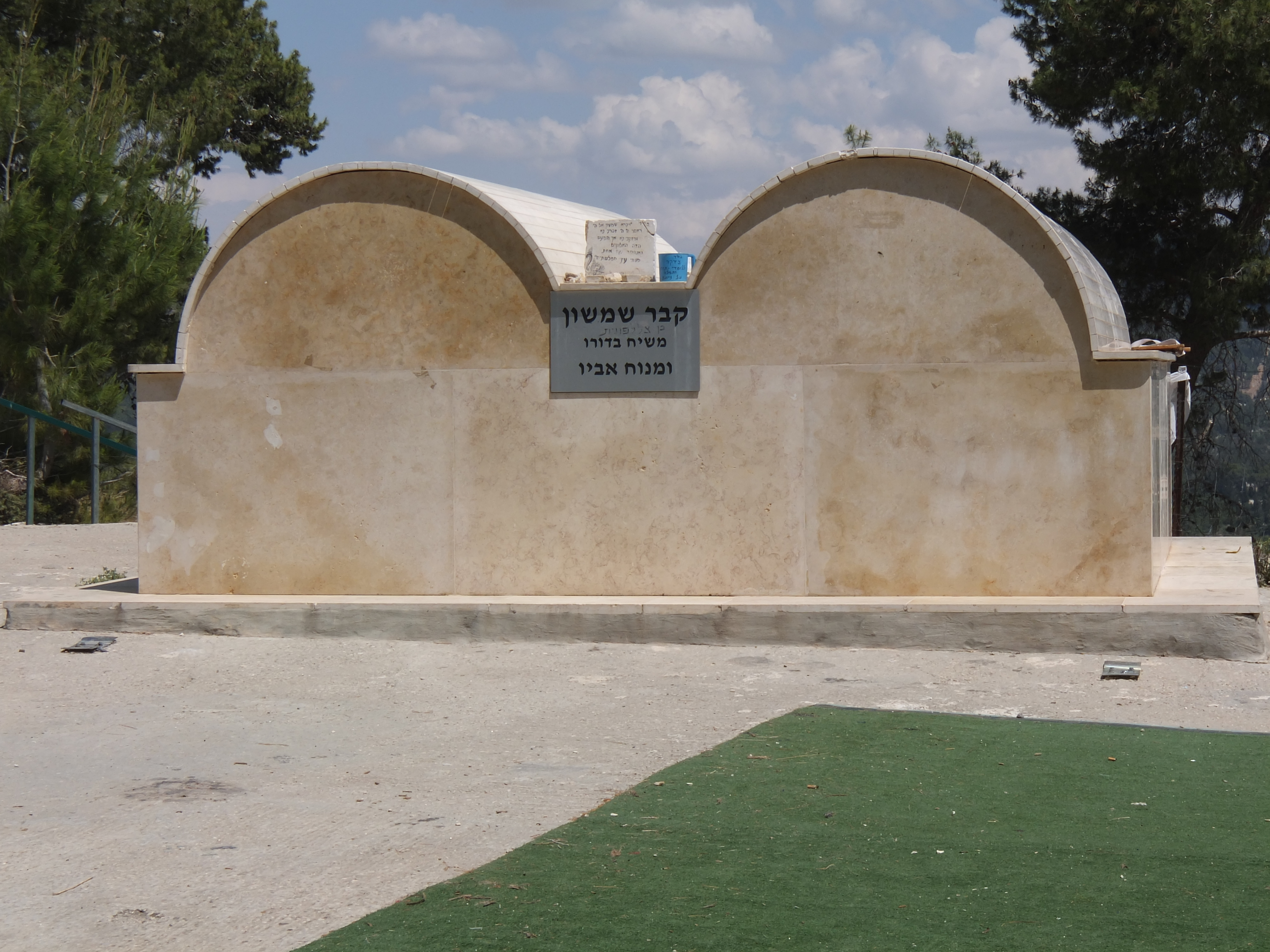
Alleged site of Samson's tomb in the Zorah (Tzora) forest

As an important biblical character, Samson has been referred to in popular culture and depicted in a vast array of films, artwork, and popular literature. Preserved Smith argued that John Milton's closet drama Samson Agonistes is an allegory for the downfall of the Puritans and the restoration of the English monarchy in which the blinded and imprisoned Samson represents Milton himself, the "Chosen People" represent the Puritans, and the Philistines represent the English Royalists. The play combines elements of ancient Greek tragedy and biblical narrative. Samson is portrayed as a hero, whose violent actions are mitigated by the righteous cause in whose name they are enacted. The play casts Delilah as an unrepentant, but sympathetic, deceiver and speaks approvingly of the subjugation of women.

In 1735, George Frideric Handel wrote the oratorio Samson, with a libretto by Newburgh Hamilton, based on Samson Agonistes. The oratorio is almost entirely set inside Samson's prison and Delilah only briefly appears in Part II. In 1877, Camille Saint-Saëns composed the opera Samson and Delilah with a libretto by Ferdinand Lemaire in which the entire story of Samson and Delilah is retold. In the libretto, Delilah is portrayed as a seductive femme fatale, but the music played during her parts invokes sympathy for her. The narrative of Samson and Delilah is retold in indie pop singer Regina Spektor's "Samson" (2002), which includes the lyrics "I cut his hair myself one night / A pair of dull scissors and the yellow light / And he told me that I'd done alright."

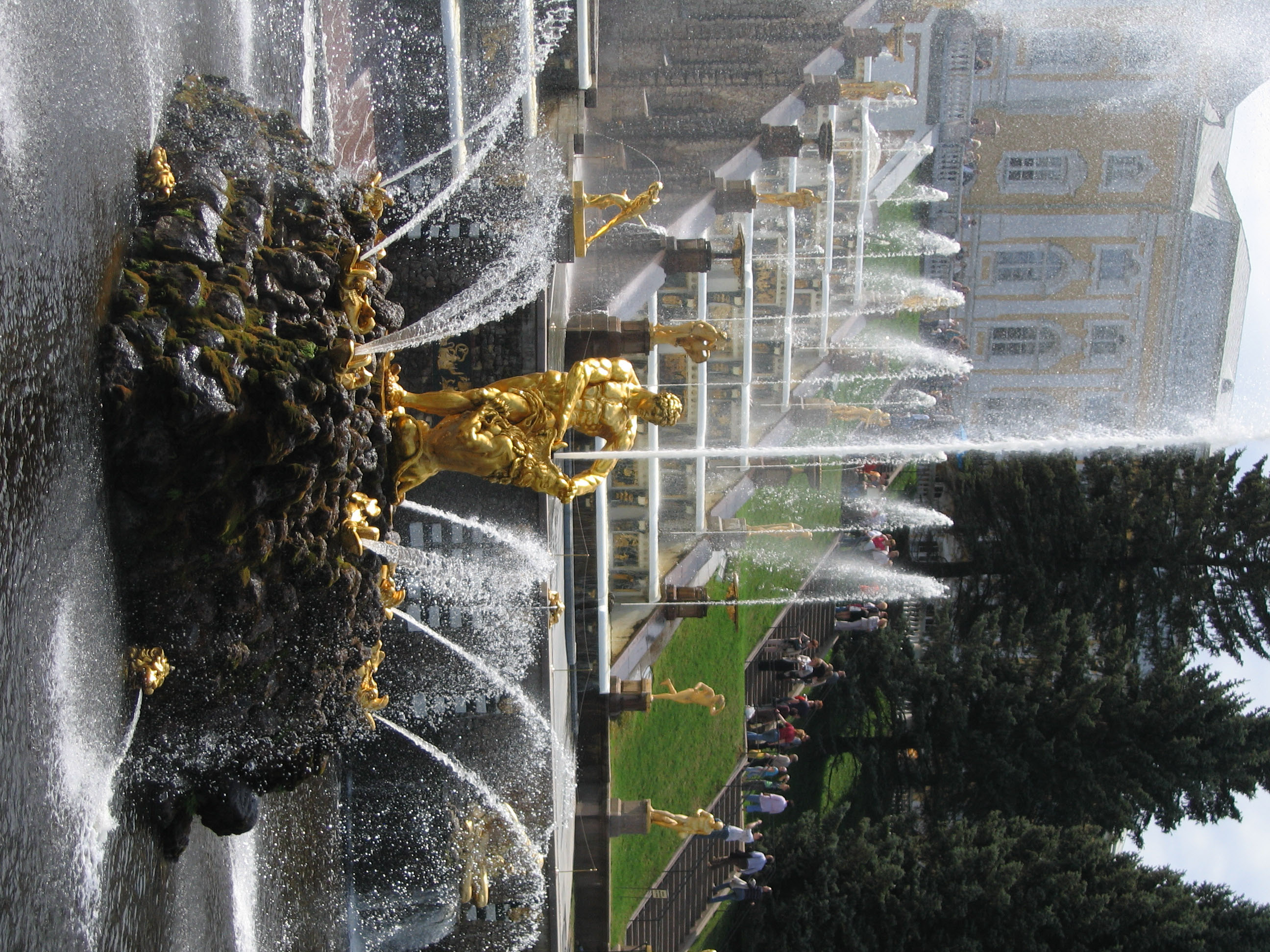
Statue of Samson and the lion in Peterhof, Russia

The 1949 biblical drama Samson and Delilah, directed by Cecil B. DeMille and starring Victor Mature and Hedy Lamarr in the titular roles, was widely praised by critics for its cinematography, lead performances, costumes, sets, and innovative special effects. It became the highest-grossing film of 1950, and was nominated for five Academy Awards, winning two. According to Variety, the film portrays Samson as a stereotypical "handsome but dumb hulk of muscle".

Samson has been especially honored in Russian artwork because the Russians defeated the Swedes in the Battle of Poltava on the feast day of St. Sampson, a Christian saint who shares Samson's name. The lion slain by Samson was interpreted to represent Sweden, as a result of the lion's placement on the Swedish coat of arms. In 1735, C. B. Rastrelli's bronze statue of Samson slaying the lion was placed in the center of the great cascade of the fountain at Peterhof Palace in Saint Petersburg.

The Grateful Dead told the story of Samson and Delilah in their song "Samson and Delilah", which was played over 350 times in live concert settings.

=== Political and military news and commentary ===
In Arabic language media, the story of Samson's suicide is often described as the first suicide attack.

In Arabic Samson's dying words differ slightly from the usual Biblical quote. In Arabic the expression is phrased differently, as roughly "Against me and my enemies, O Lord!" (Arabic: عليّ وعلى أعدائي يا رب). The phrase is a proverb in Arabic, about an attacker's desire to harm his enemy even at the cost of the attacker causing his own death. This expression has been used in the newspaper The New Arab to describe Russian nuclear strategy.

Noam Chomsky and others have said Israel suffers from a "Samson complex" which could lead to the destruction of Israel as well as Israel's opponent.

=== Military and militant references to Samson ===
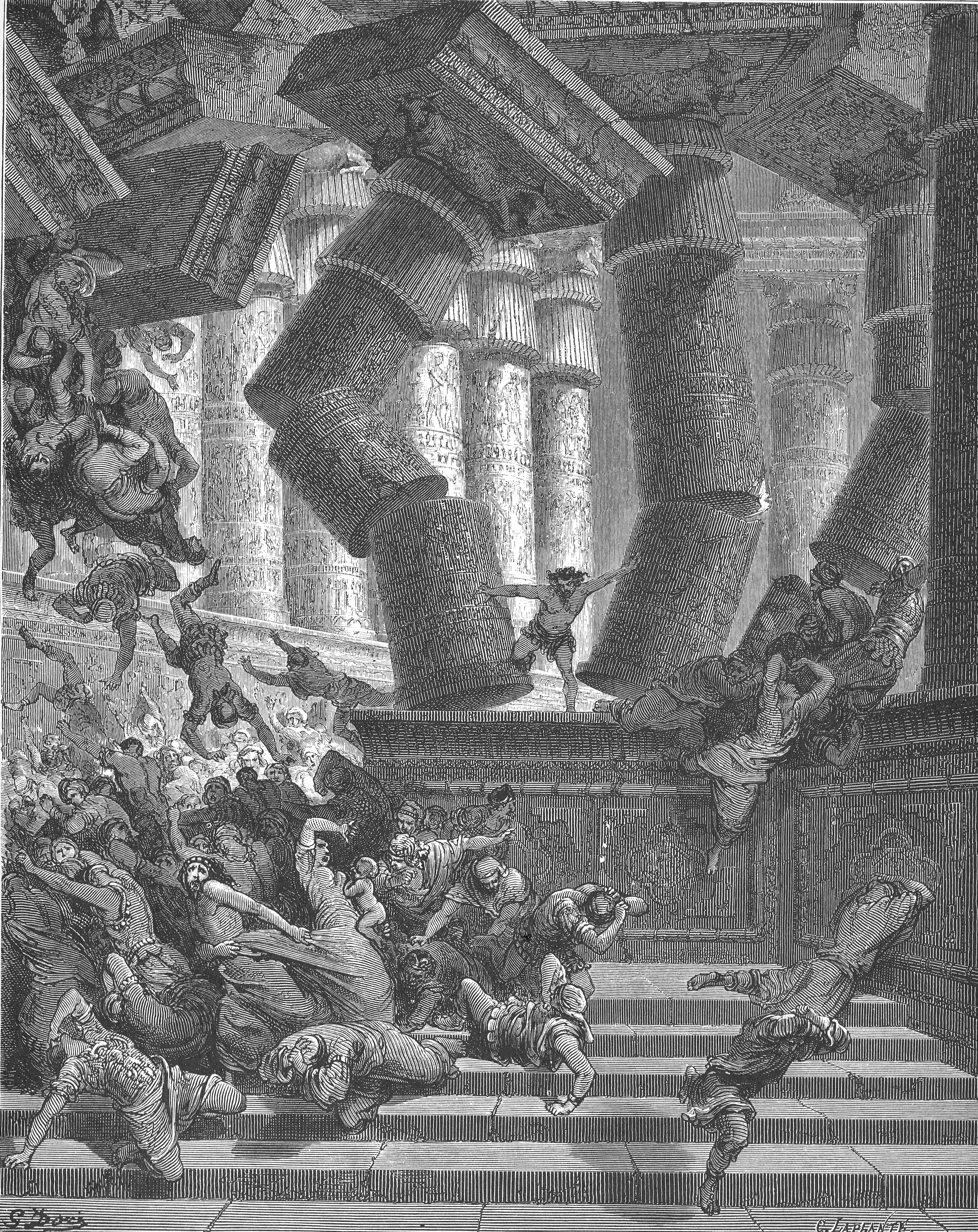
Illustration of Samson by Gustave Doré, the illustrator of the Bible that was handed to a British prison guard, on 21 April 1947, by an Irgun militant who blew himself up moments later

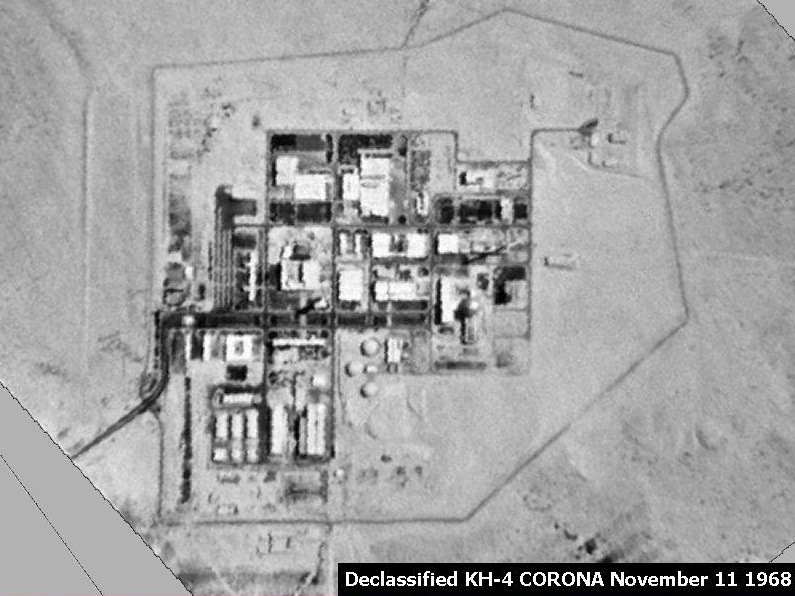
The nuclear research center near Dimona, as viewed from a Corona satellite in the late 1960s. Israel's nuclear strategy is often called the Samson Option.

Numerous current and historical military units, pieces of military hardware, operations, and strategies have names have reference the story of Samson, from both formal defense forces and irregular militant groups. Some refer to his strength, or stories during his lifetime. However, most military references to Samson refer to his death or his dying words from Judges 16:30.

==== The Samson Option nuclear strategy ====
The Samson Option is the name of Israel's nuclear strategy. The strategy was described by Seymour Hersh in his book of the same name. Israel's alleged nuclear strategy, the "Samson Option", takes its name from Samson's suicide in Gaza City, the same Biblical story that the Lehi and Irgun militant group used to describe potential and attempted suicide attacks. The story is about an Israelite judge named Samson, who kills himself and the Philistines who captured him by pushing apart the pillars of a Dagon temple, bringing down the roof crushing everyone.

==== Militant suicide operations ====
The Lehi militant group used the story of Samson's death, in Judges 16, in discussions about possible and planned suicide attacks, during their insurgency in Palestine against the British in the Middle East and Europe. In a meeting about ways to assassinate General Evelyn Barker, the British Army commander in Mandatory Palestine, a young woman volunteered to carry out the assassination as a suicide bombing. They refer to it as a "Let my soul die with the Philistines" proposal (Hebrew: תמות נפשי עם פלשתים) as a reference to the words of Samson in (Judges 16:30), or a "Samson option". On that occasion other members of the group allegedly rejected her offer. She also had a physical disability that might have made her unable to carry out the plan the group had in mind. The Lehi memorialize her among their martyrs and fallen combatants (Hebrew: הללי לח"י), but her cause of death is not described. Lehi militants, and the Irgun commander, did approve a different suicide operation plan in 1947, The only resulting casualties were one militant from each group, both male and both much younger than the women whose offer was rejected.

==== Operation Samson ====
The name Operation Samson or Operation Shimshon (Hebrew: מבצע שמשון, romanized: Mivtsa Shimshon or Mivtza Shimshon) has been used, or discussed but rejected, for multiple military or militant plans.

===== 1947 Operation Samson =====
Operation Samson was the name of a suicide operation planned by the Lehi militant group in April 1947. A Lehi militant and an Irgun militant killed themselves with IEDs made by a second Lehi militant, but the original plan was to kill some of their British opponents in the process. Shortly before midnight on 21 April 1947, two condemned Zionist militants – Meir Feinstein and Moshe Barazani – wrote "Mene! Mene! Tekel Upharsin!", from Daniel 5:25, on the walls of their shared death row cell in Jerusalem Central Prison in British-controlled Palestine, shortly before they then blew themselves to pieces. But when Lehi and Irgun veterans tell the story, they usually quote Samson's dying words from Judges 16:30, "let me die with the Philistines" (Hebrew: תמות נפשי עם פלשתים).

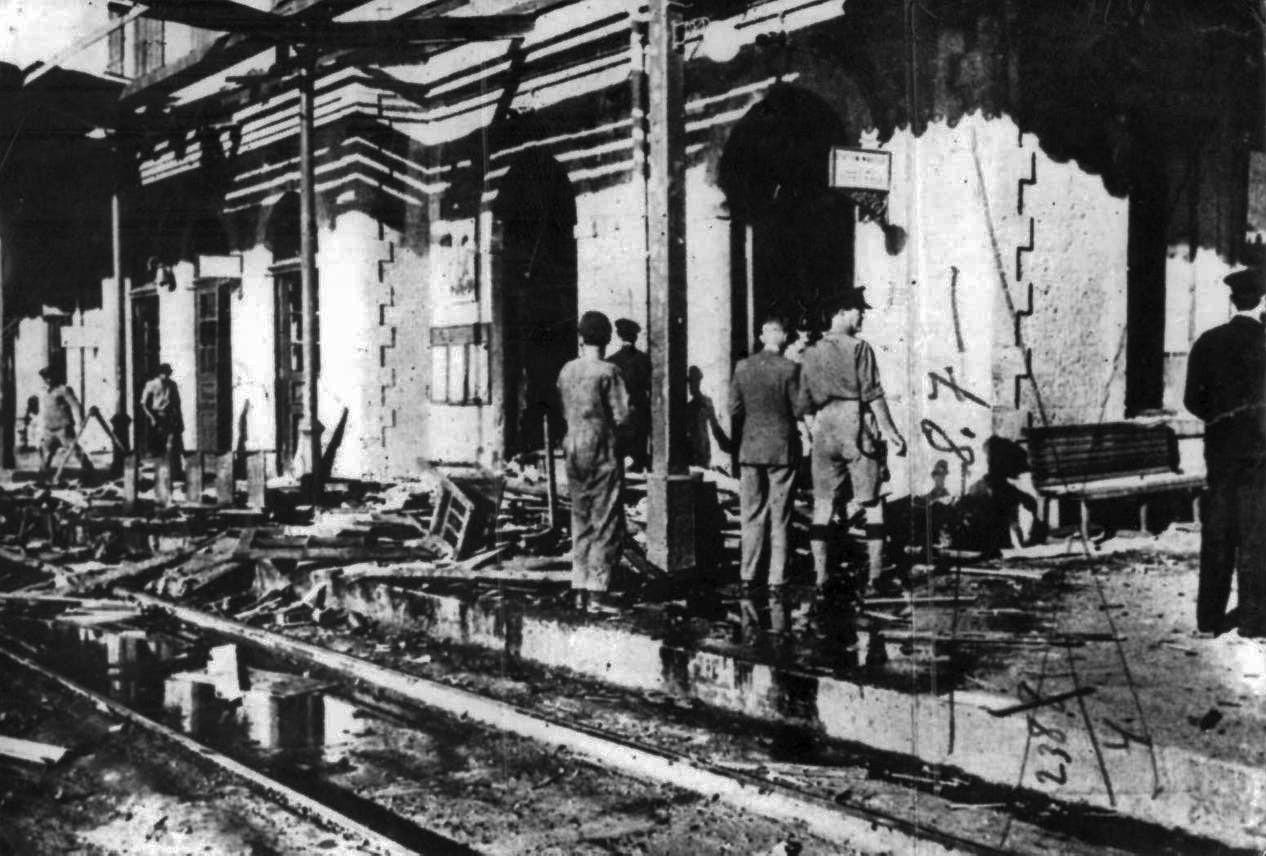
Damage caused to Jerusalem railway station by a suitcase bomb. One of the militants involved blew himself up in prison 6 months later, after being sentenced to death for the train station bombing.

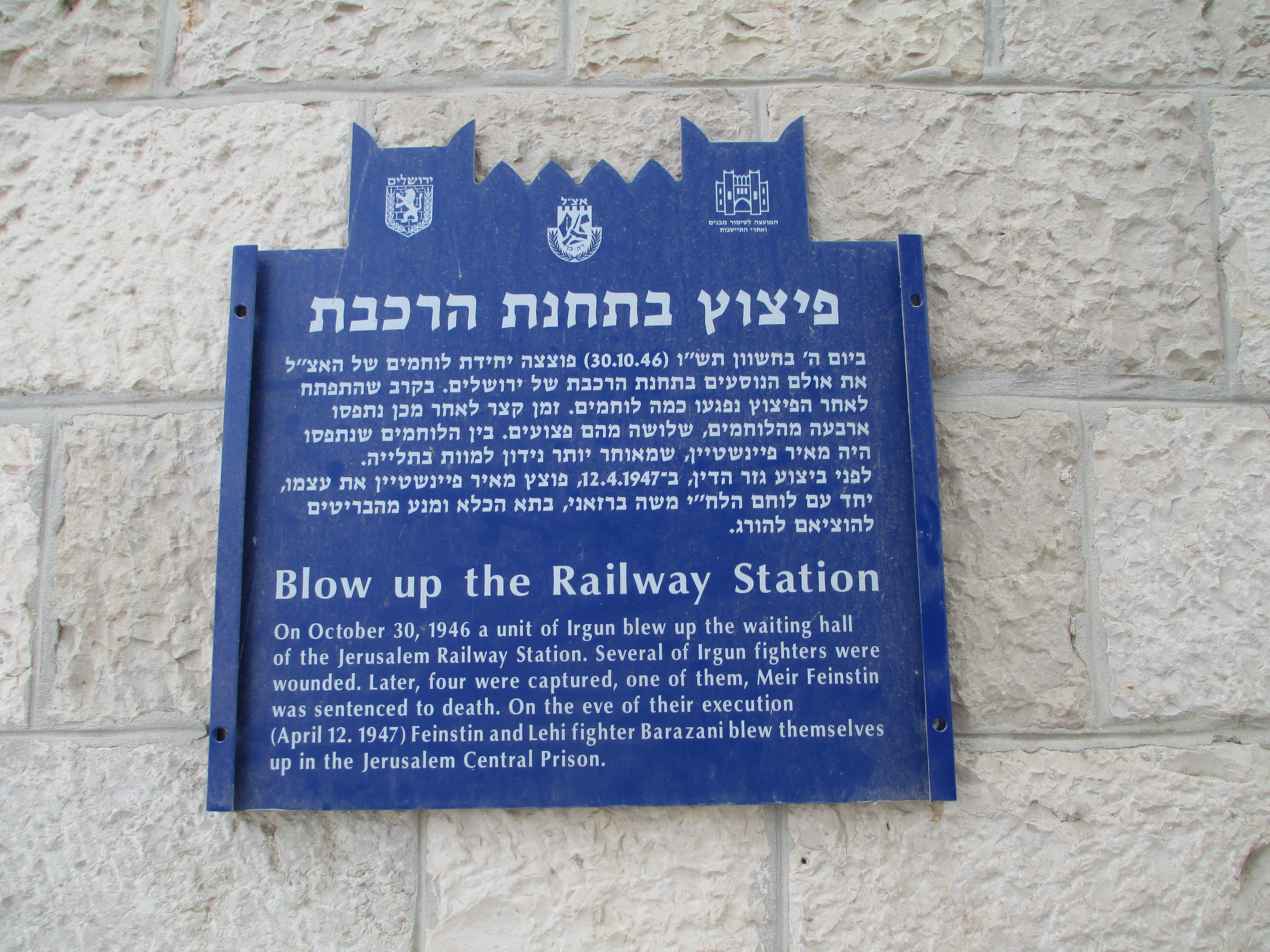
Plaque at the Jerusalem-Khan railway station about the bombing and the suicide afterwards (Note: 12 April is a misprint, other sources say the night of 21–22 April)

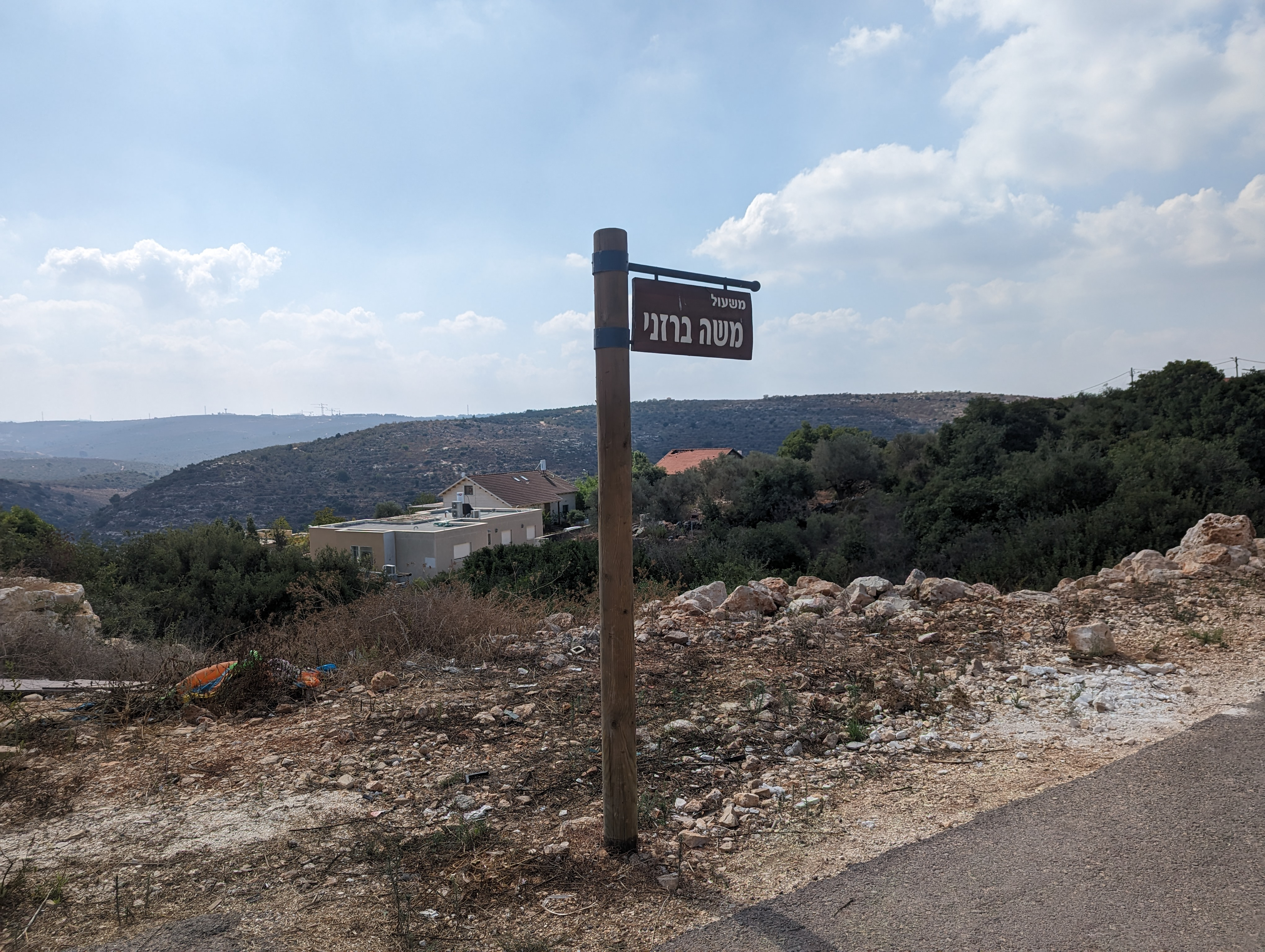
Sign for a path named after Moshe Barazani (the Lehi militant), in the Yair Farm settlement (named after Lehi founder Yair Stern), in the West Bank, Palestine

===== 1967 Operation Samson =====
Operation Samson, also spelled Shimshon, was the name of a nuclear weapons plan during the Six-Day War in 1967, The codename Shimshon was used by the Israeli military for a plan to detonate an improvised nuclear weapon or two in Egypt's Sinai desert during the Six-Day War, atop Mount Sinai by helicopter or possibly at the border via improvised nuclear truck bombs.

In an article titled "Last Secret of the Six-Day War", The New York Times reported that in the days before the war, Israel planned to insert a team of paratroopers by helicopter into the Sinai. Their mission was to set up and remotely detonate a nuclear bomb on a mountaintop as a warning to belligerent surrounding states. While outnumbered, Israel effectively eliminated the Egyptian Air Force and occupied the Sinai, winning the war before the test could even be set up. Retired Israeli brigadier general Itzhak Yaakov referred to this operation as the Samson Option.

===== Rejected name for Operation Gideon's Chariots =====
In May 2025, Operation Samson was suggested, and rejected, as a name for the operation that was named Operation Gideon's Chariots. The reason for rejection was that the plan did not intend that the army would die with the enemy in the way that Samson died with the Philistines he killed.

==== Military units named after Samson (Shimshon) ====
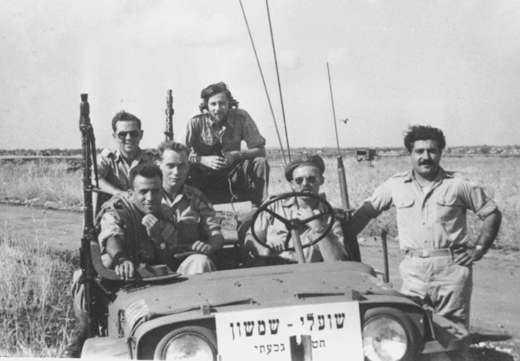
The original Samson's Foxes unit

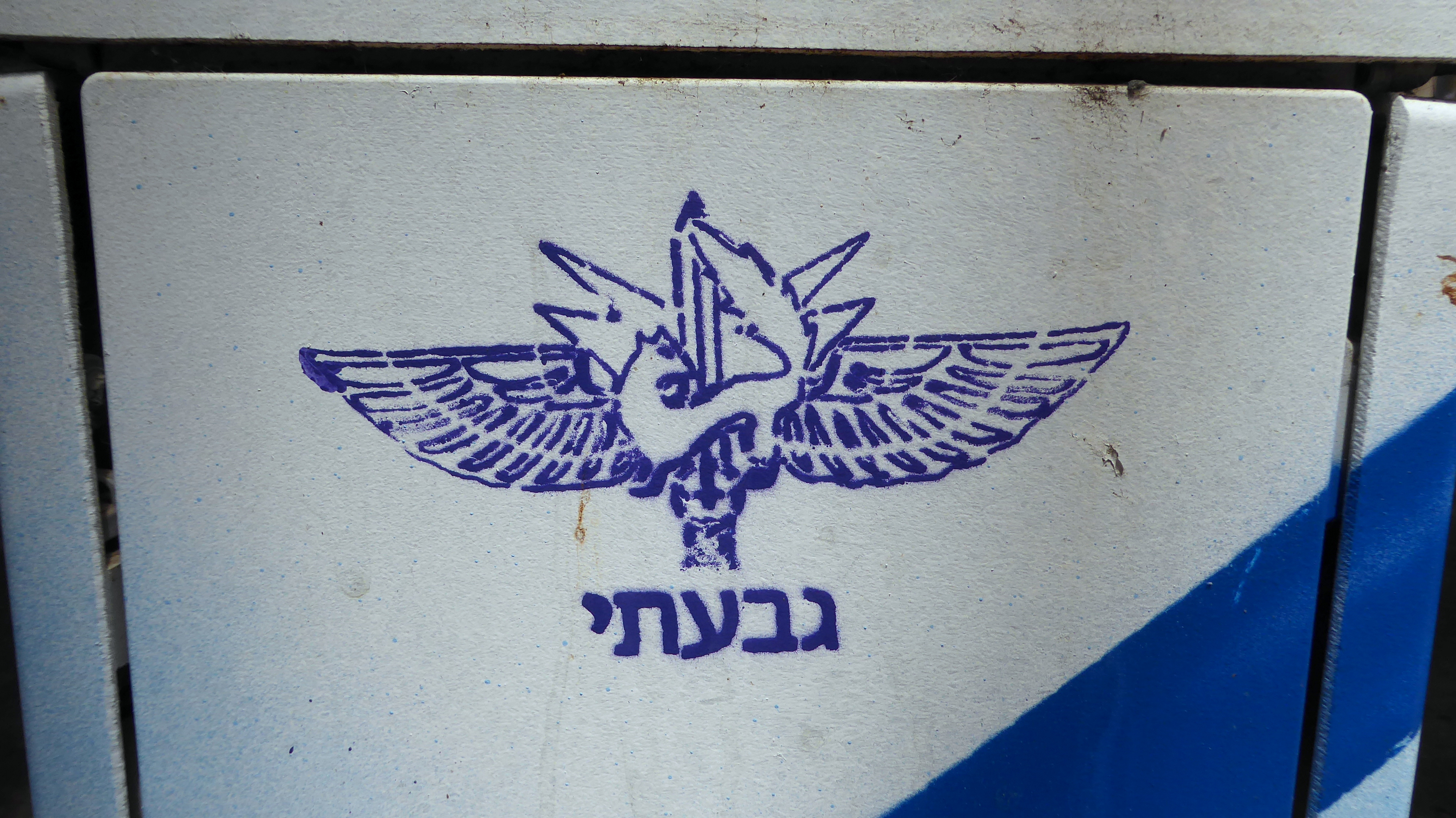
Graffiti on electrical cabinets in Ramat Gan in 2024, showing the Givati Brigade insignia with the fox

===== Samson's Foxes =====
Samson's Foxes (Hebrew: שועלי שמשון, romanized: Shualey Shimshon) were a military unit formed in 1948, now defunct. The unit's name is derived from the story in Judges 15:4 where Samson is described as having attached torches to the tails of three hundred foxes, leaving the panicked beasts to run through the fields of the Philistines, burning all in their wake.

===== Shualey Shimshon =====
Shualey Shimshon (Samson's Foxes) is now the name of the 846th Battalion (Patrol Battalion) of the Givati Brigade.

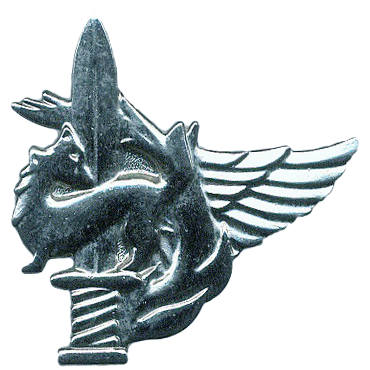
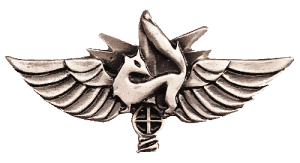
Left: Modern Givati Brigade insignia. Middle: Givati fighter pin. Right: Givati Brigade patrol battalion pin.

===== Samson Unit =====
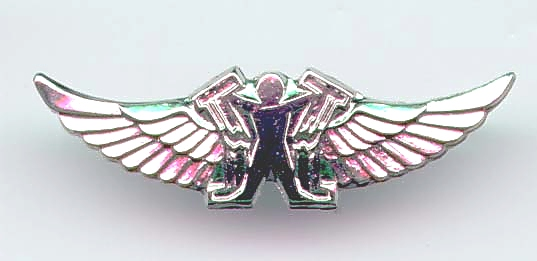
Pin of the Samson Unit

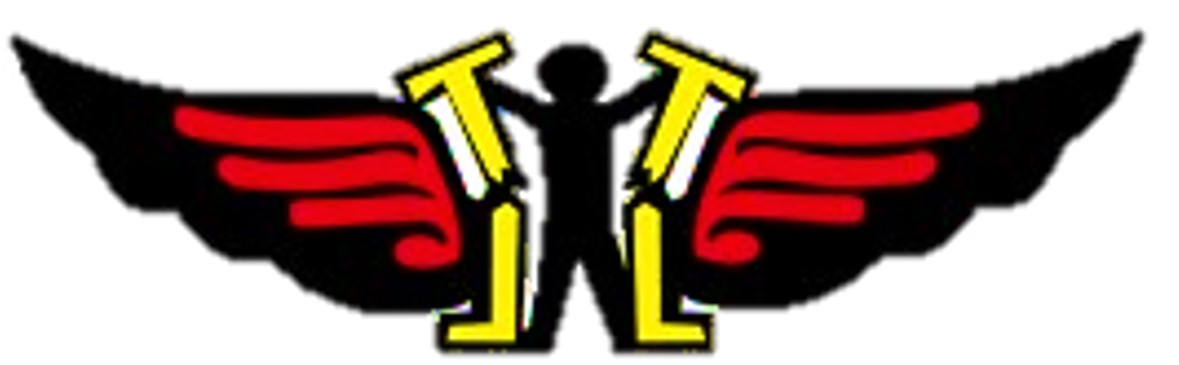
The Samson Unit's insignia is now used by the Kfir Brigade's Shimshon Battalion.

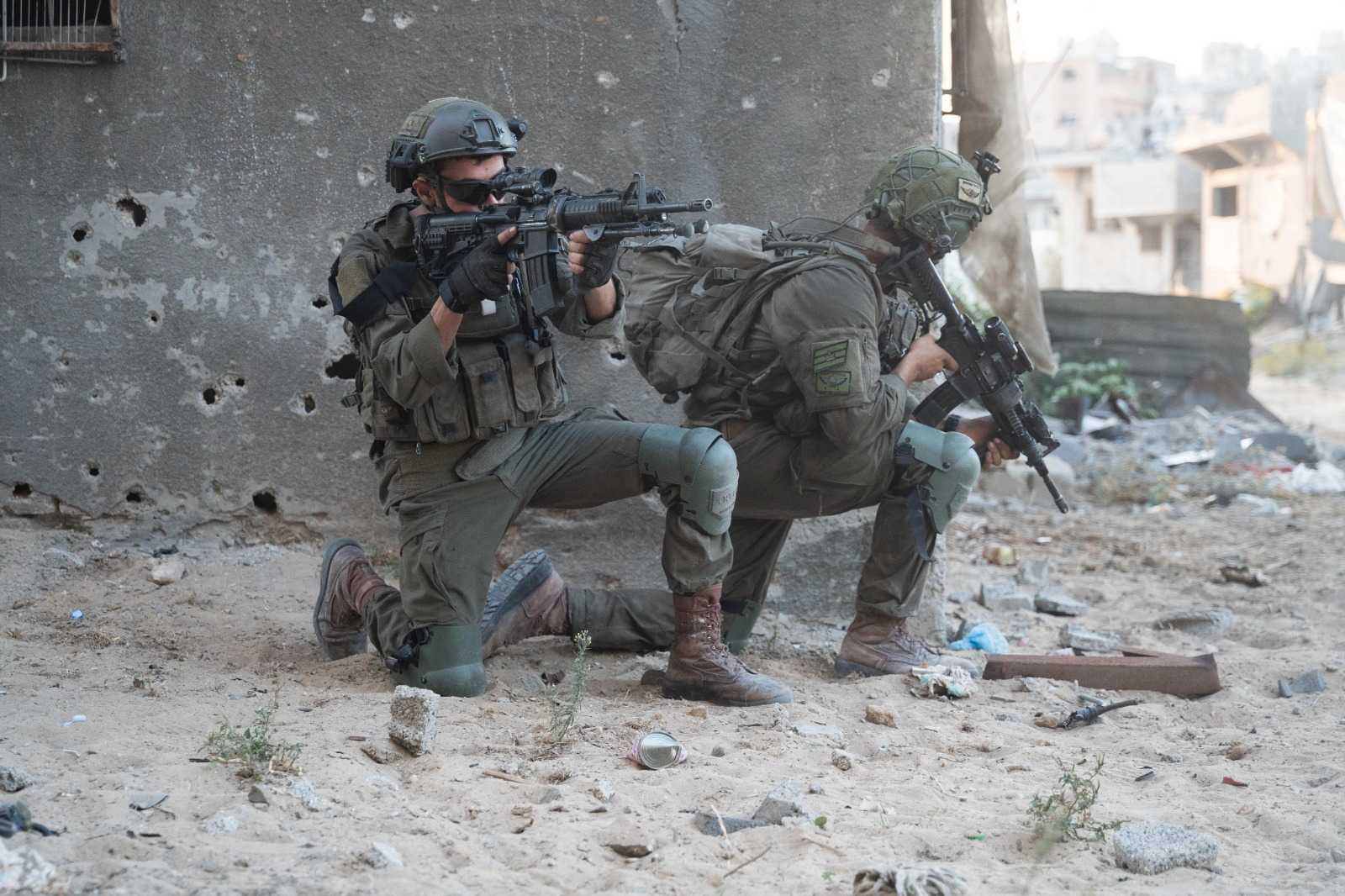
Shimshon Battalion fighters in Jabaliya during the Siege of North Gaza in November 2024, during the Gaza War

The Samson Unit (Hebrew: יחידת שמשון, romanized: Yehidat Shimshon) was an IDF undercover unit that operated in the Gaza Strip from 1986 until 1996. Their main role was conducting undercover military operations against irregular militants in the Gaza Strip. The insignia of the Samson Unit (1986–1996) depict Samson pushing apart the pillars of the temple of Dagon in was in Gaza City.

===== Shimshon Battalion 92nd Infantry Battalion of the Kfir Brigade =====
The Samson Unit's name and insignia were transferred to the Shimshon Battalion, the 92nd Infantry Battalion of the Kfir Brigade (Hebrew: חטיבת כפיר).

==== Military hardware ====
===== Samson Remote Controlled Weapon Station =====
The Samson Remote Controlled Weapon Station also known as Katlanit (קטלנית in Hebrew: "lethal") is a remote weapon system that enables a variety of devices to be operated automatically or by remote control, including 5.56 mm, 7.62 mm, and 12.7 mm .50 BMG machine guns, 40 mm automatic grenade launchers, anti-tank missiles and observation pods.

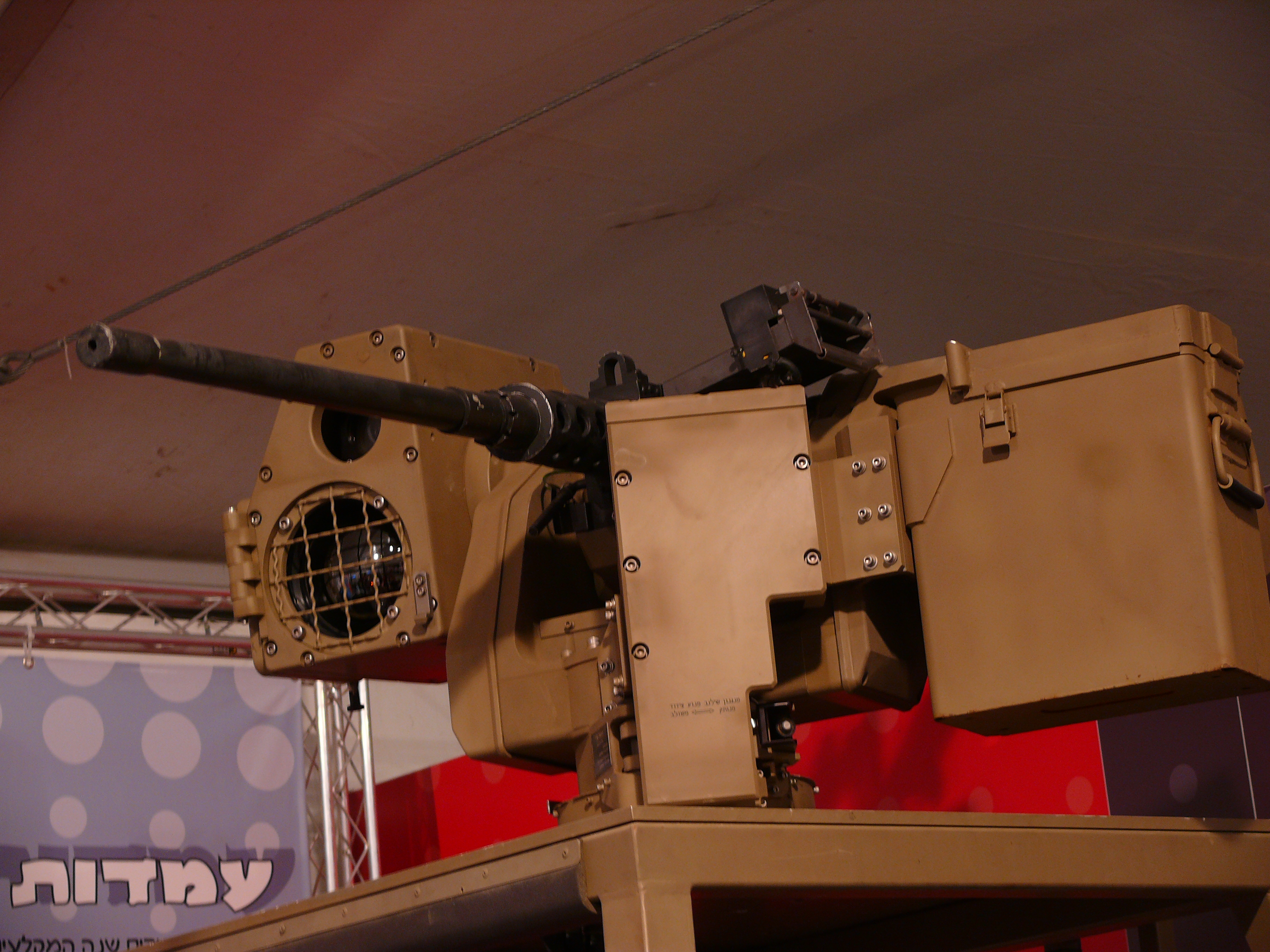
M2 Browning machine gun controlled by Samson RCWS

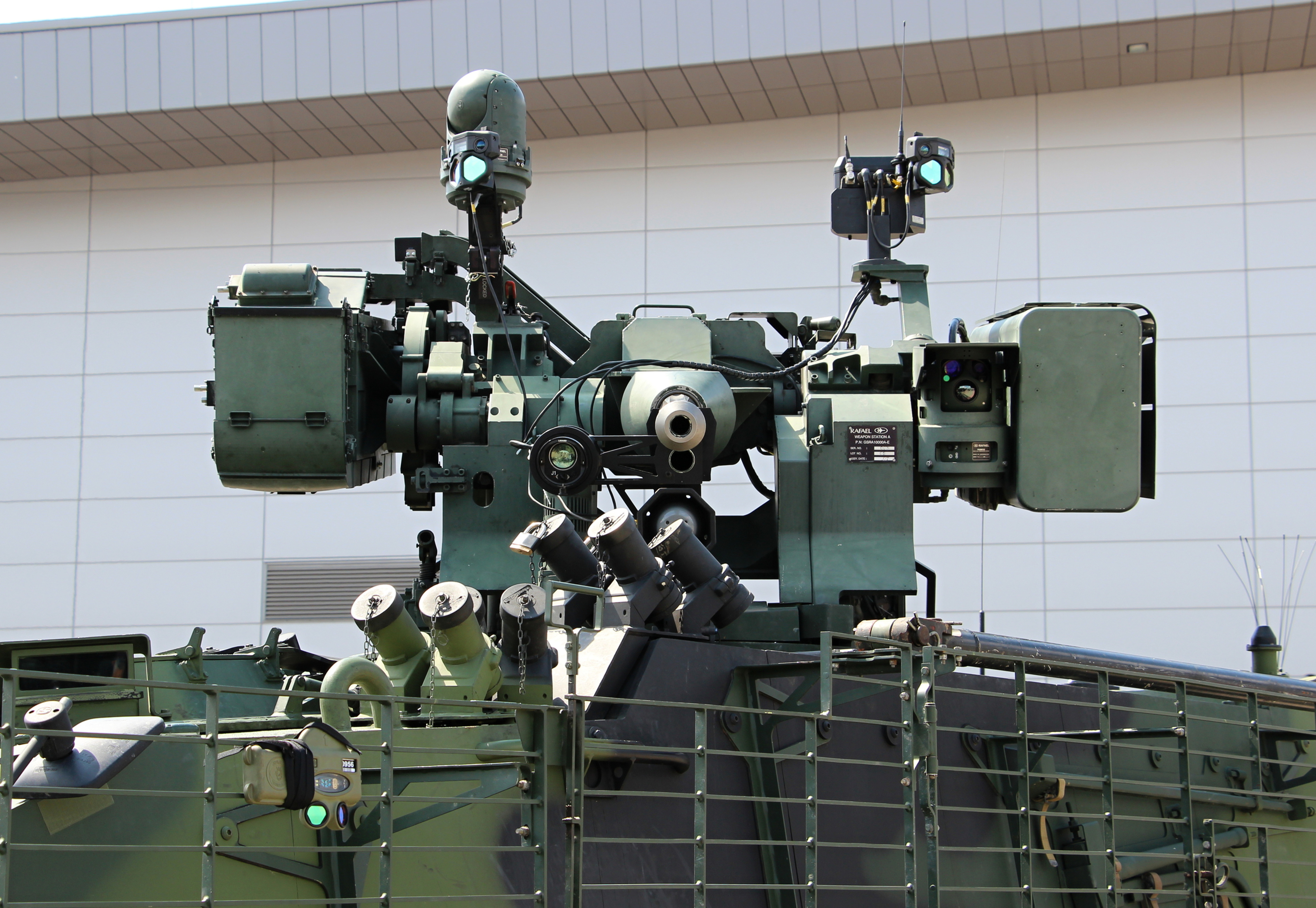
Samson mounted on Czech Pandur II IFV

===== FV106 Samson =====
FV106 Samson was a British Army armoured recovery vehicle, one of the CVR(T) family. The main role of this vehicle was to recover the CVR(T) family of vehicles, but could also recover other light tracked vehicles such as the FV430 series.

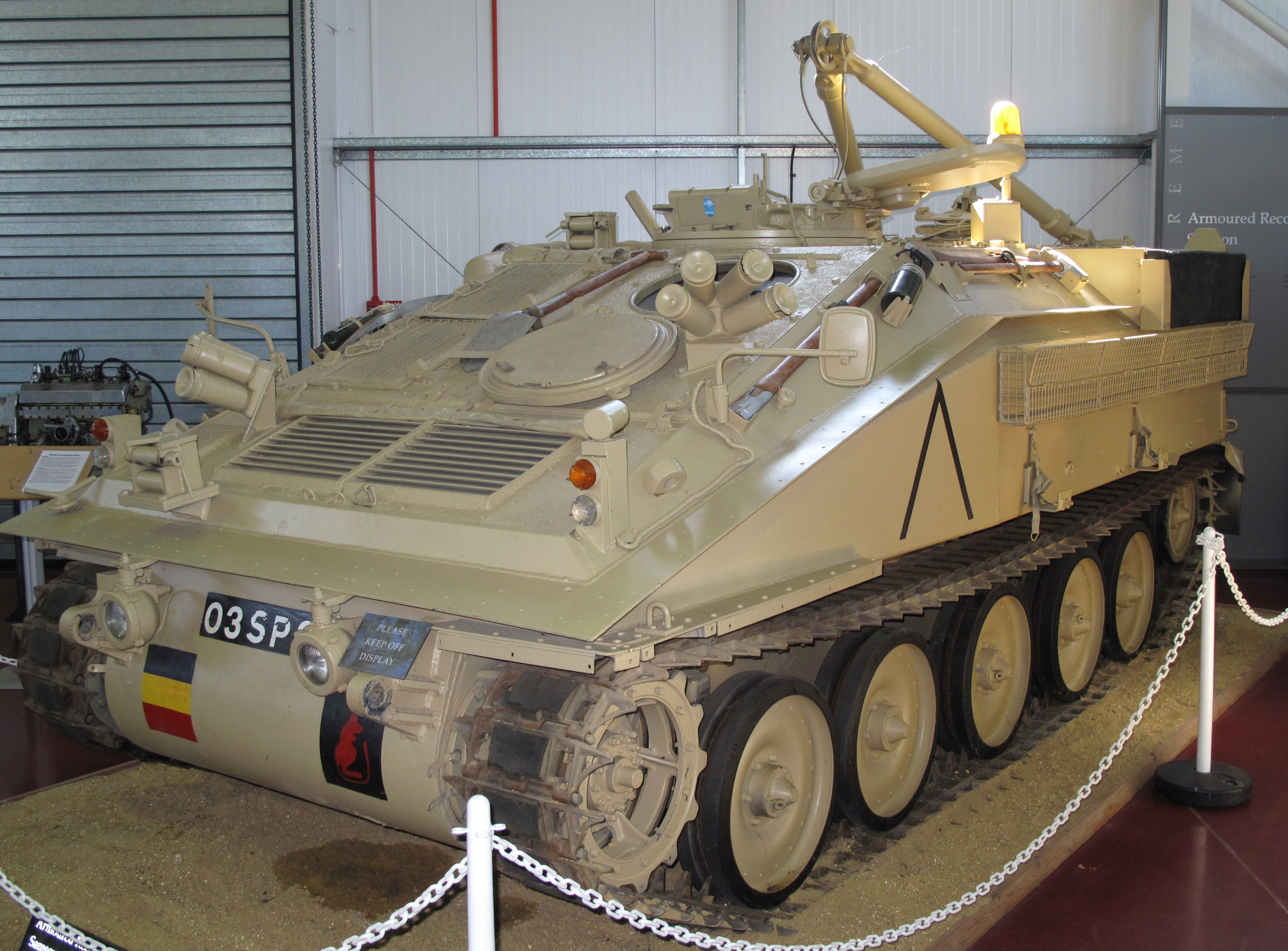

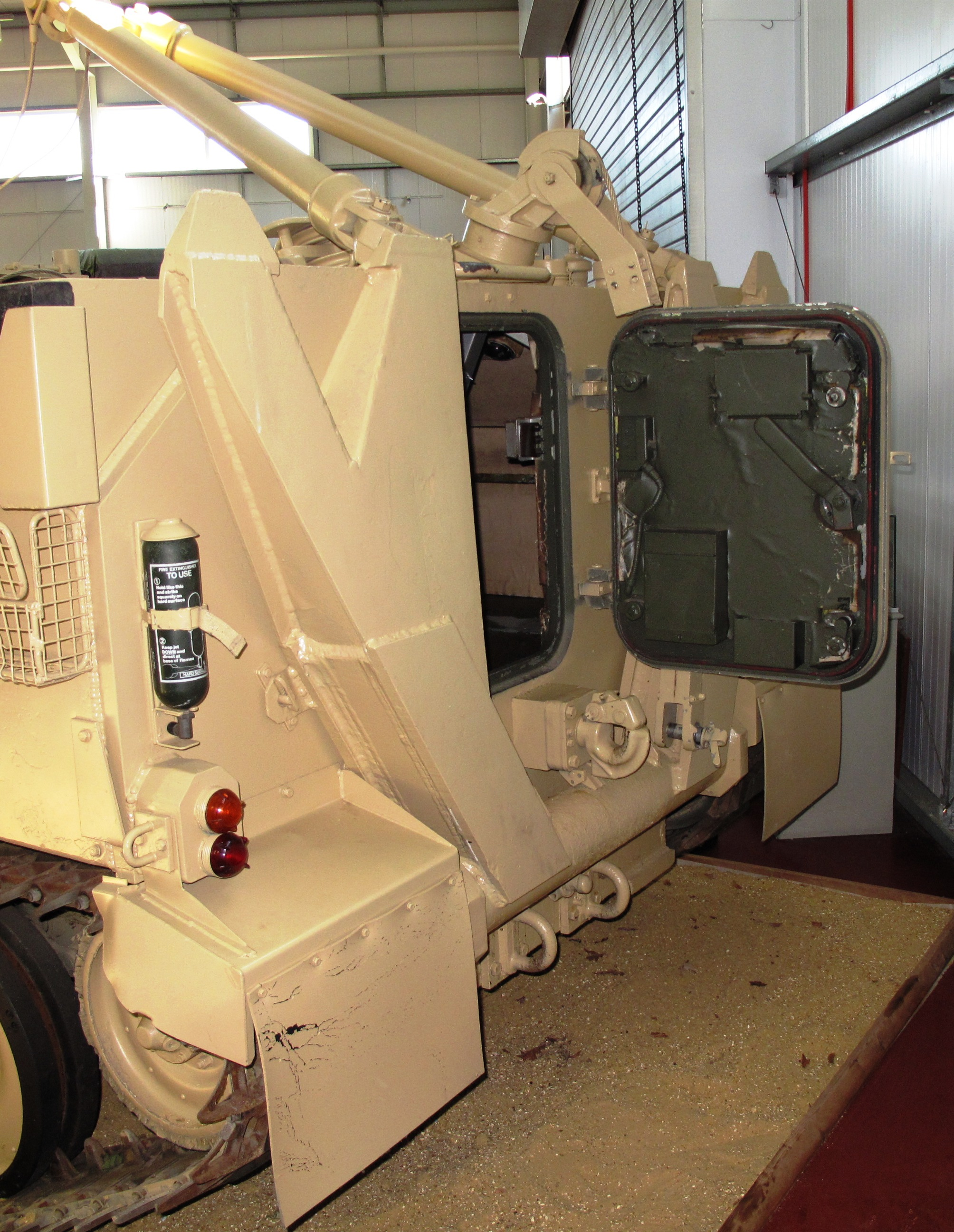
FV106 Samson front (left) and rear view (right) of a Samson showing the rear crew hatch, A-frame and anchor

===== Lockheed Martin C-130J Super Hercules =====
Shimshon (Hebrew: שמשון, romanized: Shimshon or Hebrew: השמשון, romanized: HaShimshon, lit. 'The Samson') is the name for some models of the Lockheed Martin C-130J Super Hercules.

They are used by the 103 Squadron of the Israeli Air Force. The 103 Squadron of the Israeli Air Force, also known as the Elephants Squadron, is a C-130J Super Hercules squadron based at Nevatim Airbase. The Squadron formerly operated the C-130E and KC-130H models of the Hercules.

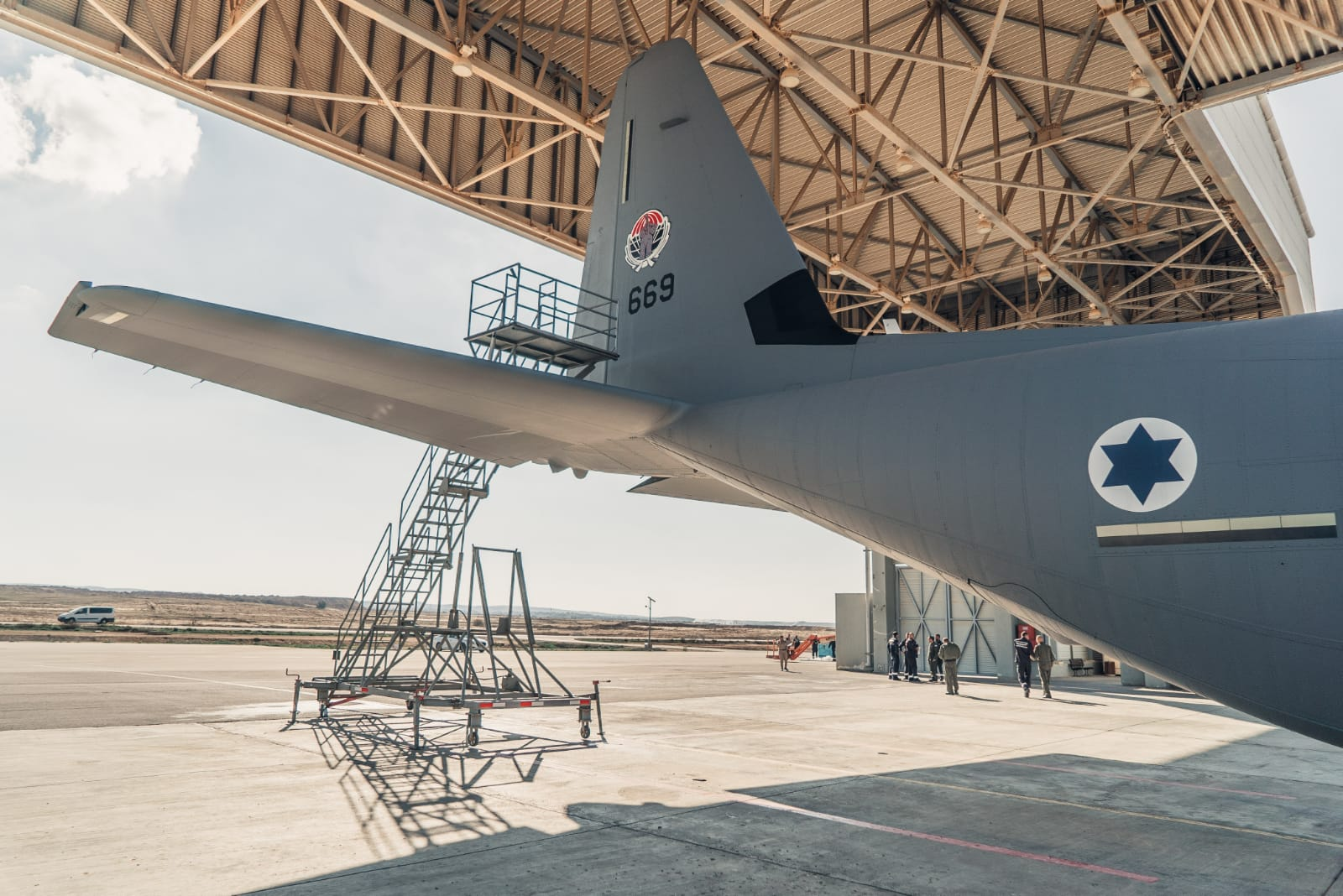
The Samson Squadron expanding its operational activities

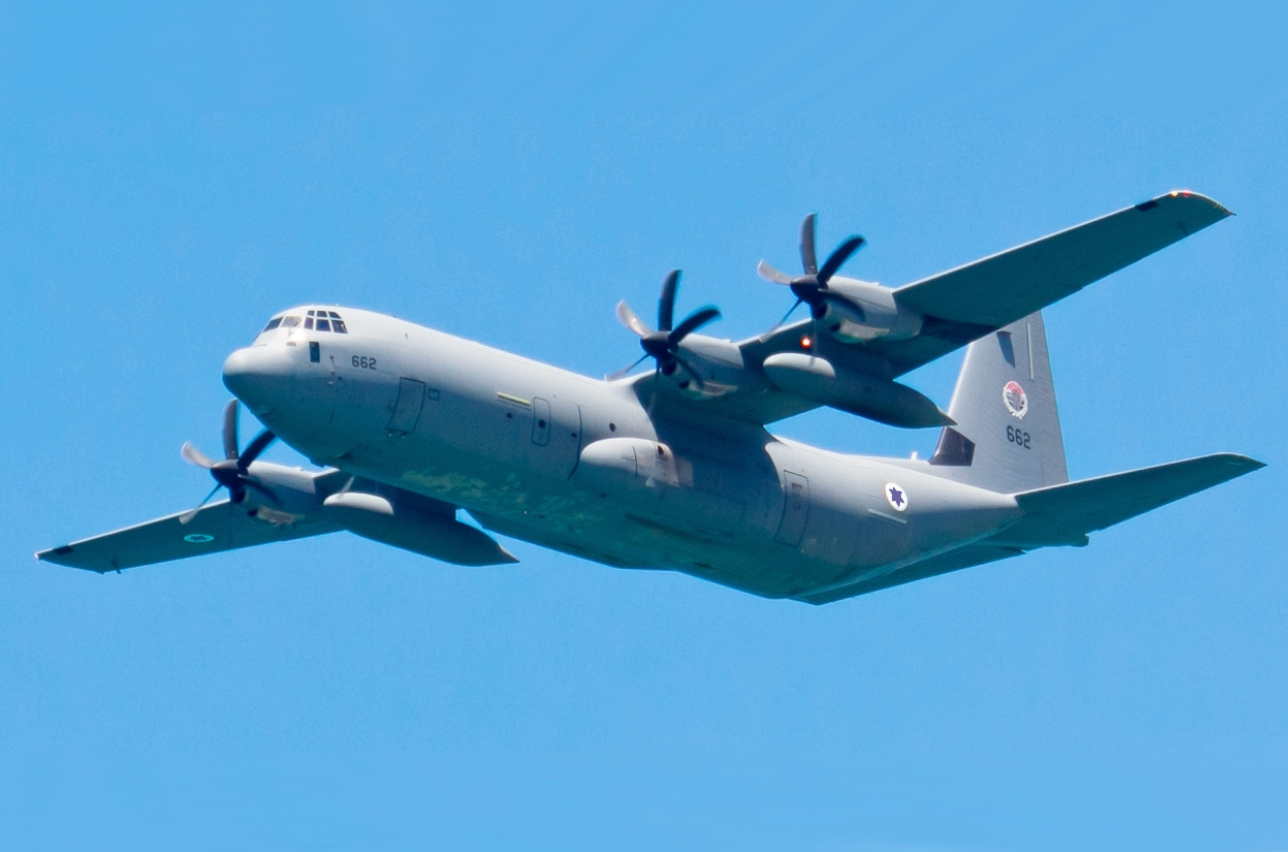
C-130J Shimshon during Israel's 68th Independence Day

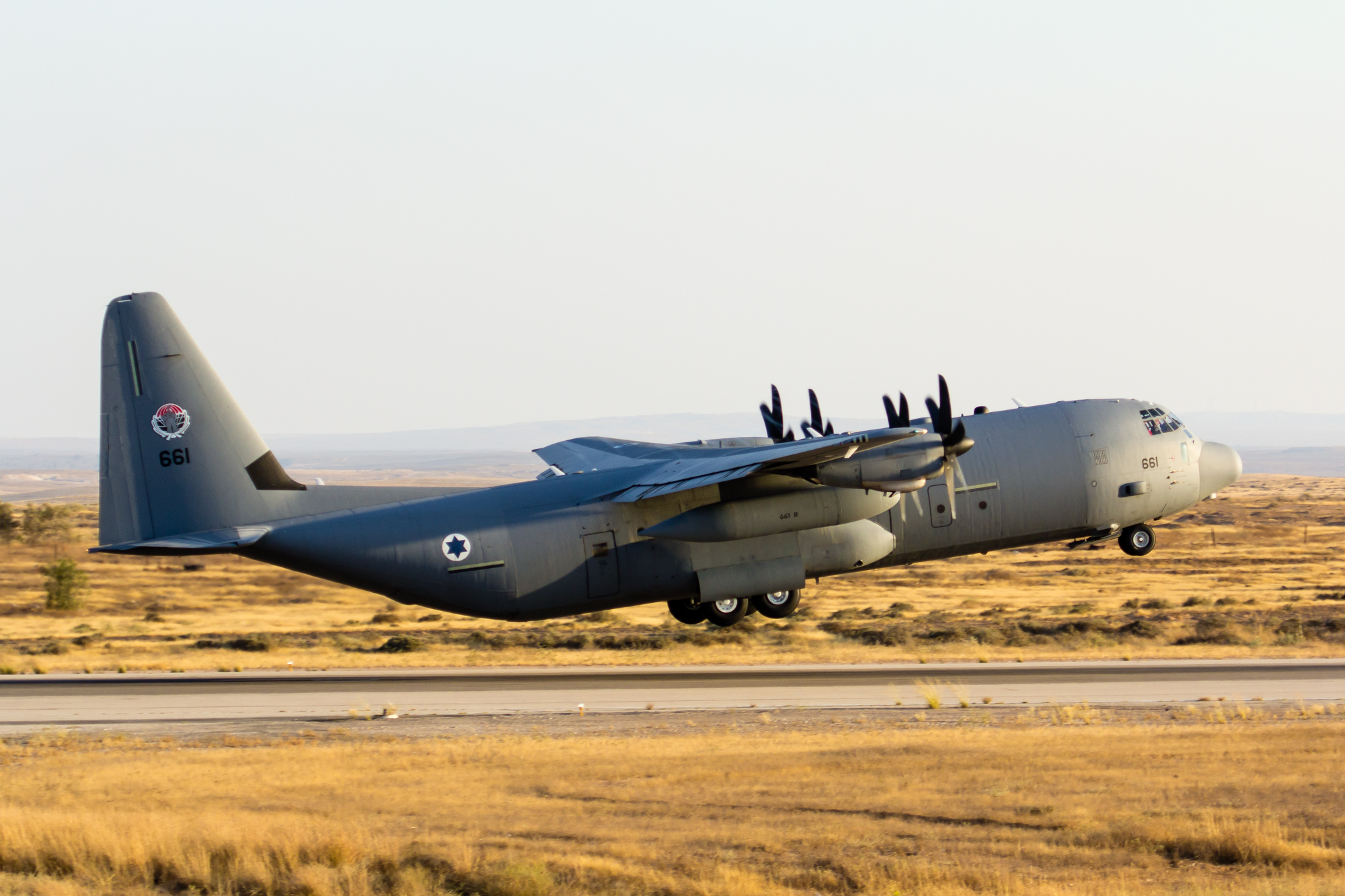
103 Squadron Aircraft taking off

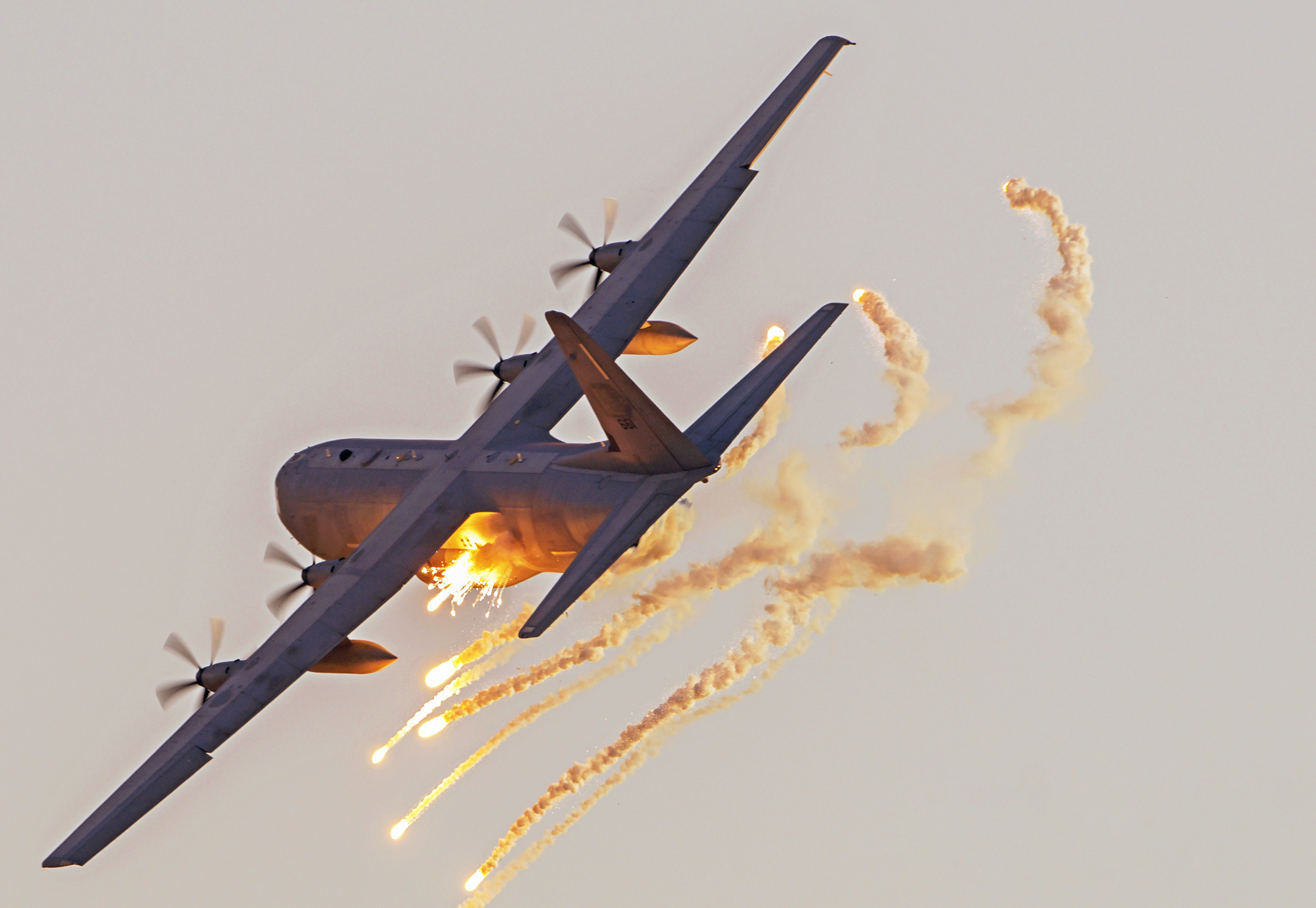
Samson-C130J aircraft of the 'Elephant' Squadron

== See also ==
- Delilah
- Judas Iscariot
- Kiss of Judas
- Samson and Delilah (1984 film)
- Super strength

== Sources ==
- Hersh, Seymour (1991), The Samson Option: Israel's Nuclear Arsenal and American Foreign Policy, Random House
- Klein, Yair (3 May 2022). היום בהיסטוריה: פיינשטיין וברזני מקדימים את התליין [Today in History: Feinstein and Barzani outrun the executioner]. srugim.co.il (in Hebrew). Israel. Archived from the original on 30 June 2025.

Samson Tribe of Dan
Preceded by Abdon	Judge of Israel	Succeeded by Eli
