= Samson Unit =

Unit 367
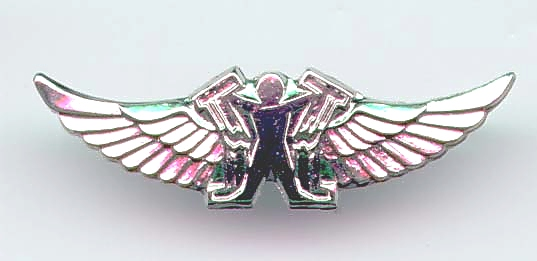
- Badge of Samson Unit
- Active: 1986–1996
- Country: Israel
- Branch: Israeli Ground Forces
- Type: Mista'arvim
- Role: Special Reconnaissance; Undercover Counterterrorism; Counterterrorism
- Size: ~250
- Garrison/HQ: Nuria Military Base

Unit 367, Samson Unit, or Shimshon (שמשון), was a special forces unit within the Israel Defense Forces named after the biblical figure Samson.

== History ==
Shimshon unit's modus operandi focused on undercover military operations against Palestinian militants in the Gaza Strip.

Shimshon was disbanded in 1996 following the Oslo Accords.

Samson Unit's roles are believed to have included:

- Intelligence collection in the battlespace on an ongoing basis, as means to continuously know the area, and as preparation for upcoming operations. Samson reportedly gathered intelligence for its and other units’ operations.
- Counter-terrorism operations in the Gaza Strip, which included psychological warfare and the arrest of key enemy combatants
