= 103 Squadron (Israel) =

Israeli military unit

- טייסת הפילים
- Country: Israel
- Allegiance: Israeli Air Force
- Branch: Air Force
- Size: Squadron
- Garrison/HQ: Nevatim Airbase
- Nickname: Elephants Squadron

Aircraft flown
- Transport: C-130J Super Hercules; C-130E & KC-130H

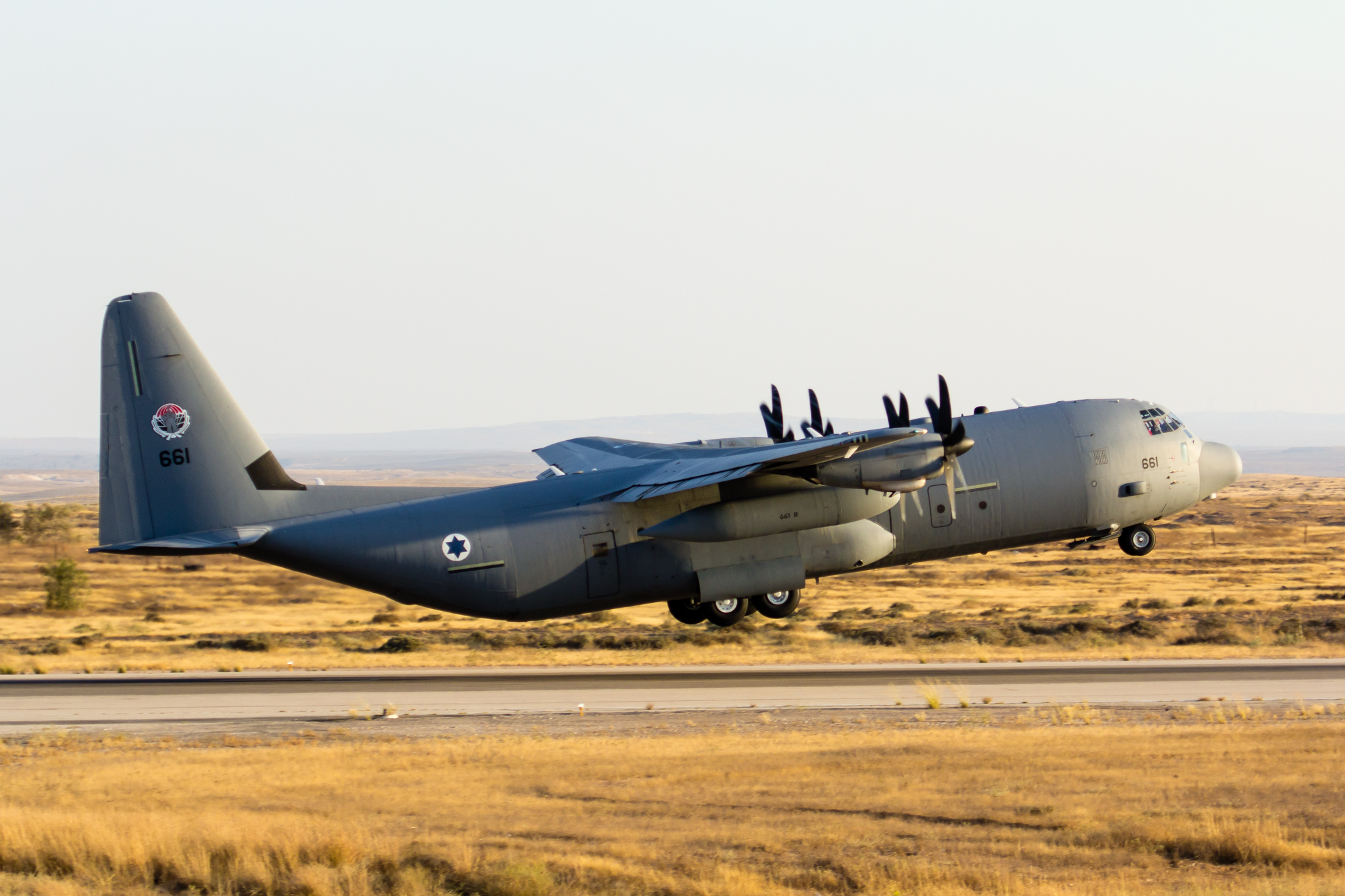
Squadron Aircraft taking off

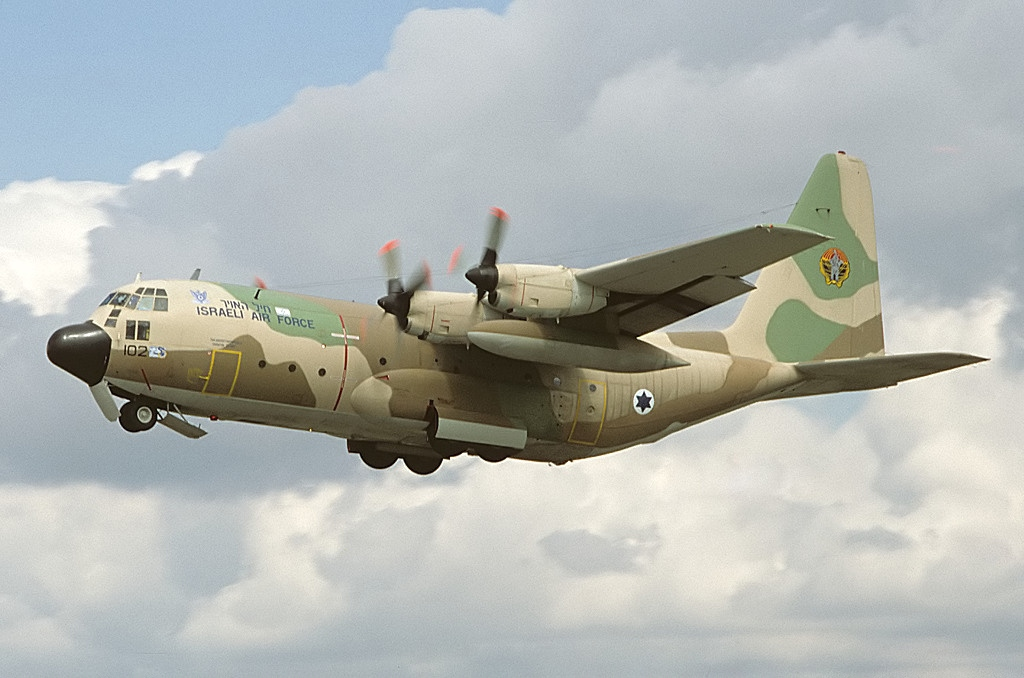
C-130 of the squadron during an exercise

The 103 Squadron of the Israeli Air Force, also known as the Elephants Squadron, is a C-130J Super Hercules squadron based at Nevatim Airbase. The Squadron formerly operated the C-130E and KC-130H models of the Hercules.
