= Judean Mountains Natural Region =

Coordinates: 31°46′55″N 35°13′10″E

- Natural Region
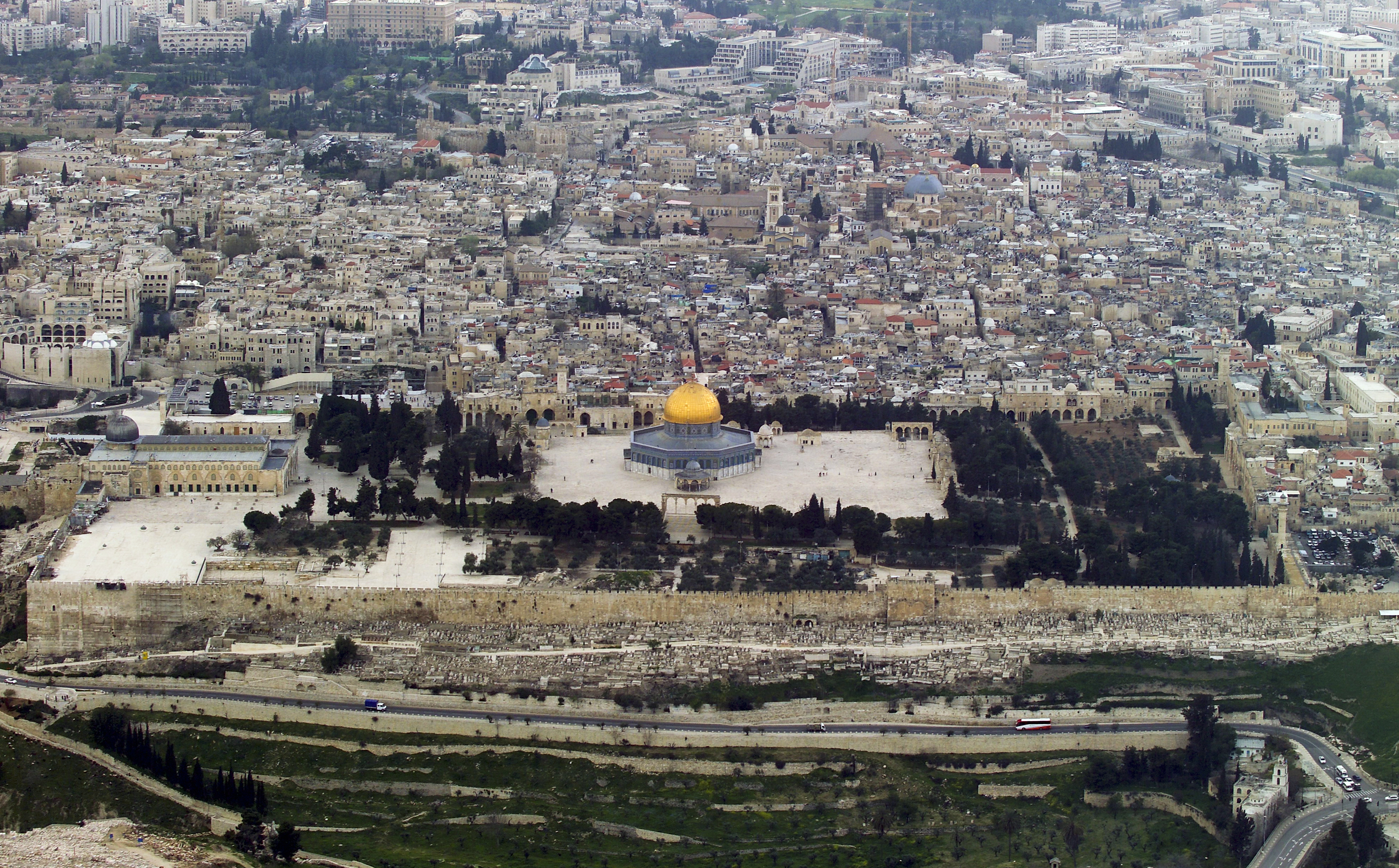
- Panorama of Jerusalem
- Country: Israel
- District: Jerusalem
- Subdistrict: None
- Largest City: Jerusalem

Area
  - Total: 316 km^{2} (122 sq mi)

Population (2024)
  - Total: 1,129,987

Ethnicity
  - Jews and others: 58.5%
  - Arabs: 36.8%

The Judean Mountains Natural Region is a natural region in the Jerusalem District of Israel. Jerusalem is the largest city in the natural region.

== Geography ==
Districts, Subdistricts and Natural Regions of the State of Israel, 2018

As its name suggests, the natural region consists of the portion of the Judean Mountains that is located within the Jerusalem District. It is located near the geographic center of Israel, centered on Jerusalem. It has an area of 316 km^{2}. 93 percent of the natural region's population resides in Jerusalem. Other sizable towns in the natural region include Mevaseret Zion, Abu Ghosh, and Kiryat Ye'arim, all of which are suburbs of Jerusalem. The natural region is contained within the Mateh Yehuda Regional Council.

== Demographics ==
With a population of 1,129,987 as of 2024, the Judean Mountains Natural Region is the most populous natural region in Israel. 58 percent of the residents of the natural region are Jewish. 37 percent of residents are Arabs, who are concentrated in East Jerusalem (many of whose Arabs are not Israeli citizens) as well as the three western Jerusalem suburbs of Abu Ghosh, Ein Naqquba, and Ein Rafa (whose residents are all Arab citizens of Israel).

Historical population
Year	Pop.	±%
1972	330,900	—
1983	446,600	+35.0%
1995	653,000	+46.2%
2008	815,030	+24.8%
2022	1,083,344	+32.9%
2024	1,129,987	+4.3%

== Administrative local authorities ==
Cities	Local Councils	Villages
Jerusalem (see also: Jerusalem Municipality)	Abu Ghosh; Kiryat Ye'arim; Mevaseret Zion; Tzur Hadassah	Mateh Yehuda: Aminadav; Bar Giora; Beit Meir; Beit Nekofa; Beit Zayit; Ein Kerem Agricultural School; Ein Naqquba; Ein Rafa; Eitanim; Even Sapir; Givat Ye'arim; Kiryat Anavim; Kiryat Ye'arim Youth Village; Ksalon; Ma'ale HaHamisha; Mata; Mevo Beitar; Motza Illit; Nataf; Nes Harim; Neve Ilan; Ora; Ramat Rachel; Ramat Raziel; Sho'eva; Shoresh; Tzova; Yad HaShmona; Yedida

== Voting Patterns ==
In the 2022 election, 72 percent of voters in the natural region voted for the parties of the right-wing coalition led by Benjamin Netanyahu, while 22 percent voted for the parties of the center-left coalition led by Yair Lapid and 3 percent voted for the Arab parties.

In the 2026 election, 65 percent of voters in the natural region voted for the parties of the right-wing coalition led by Benjamin Netanyahu, while 23 percent voted for the parties of the center-left coalition led by Gadi Eisenkot and 6 percent voted for the Arab parties. An additional 2 percent voted for the Reservists, and 1.9 percent voted for Amcha Yisrael. Voter turnout increased 14 percent from the 2022 election.
