= Judean Foothills Natural Region =

Coordinates: 31°44′34″N 34°59′45″E

- Natural Region
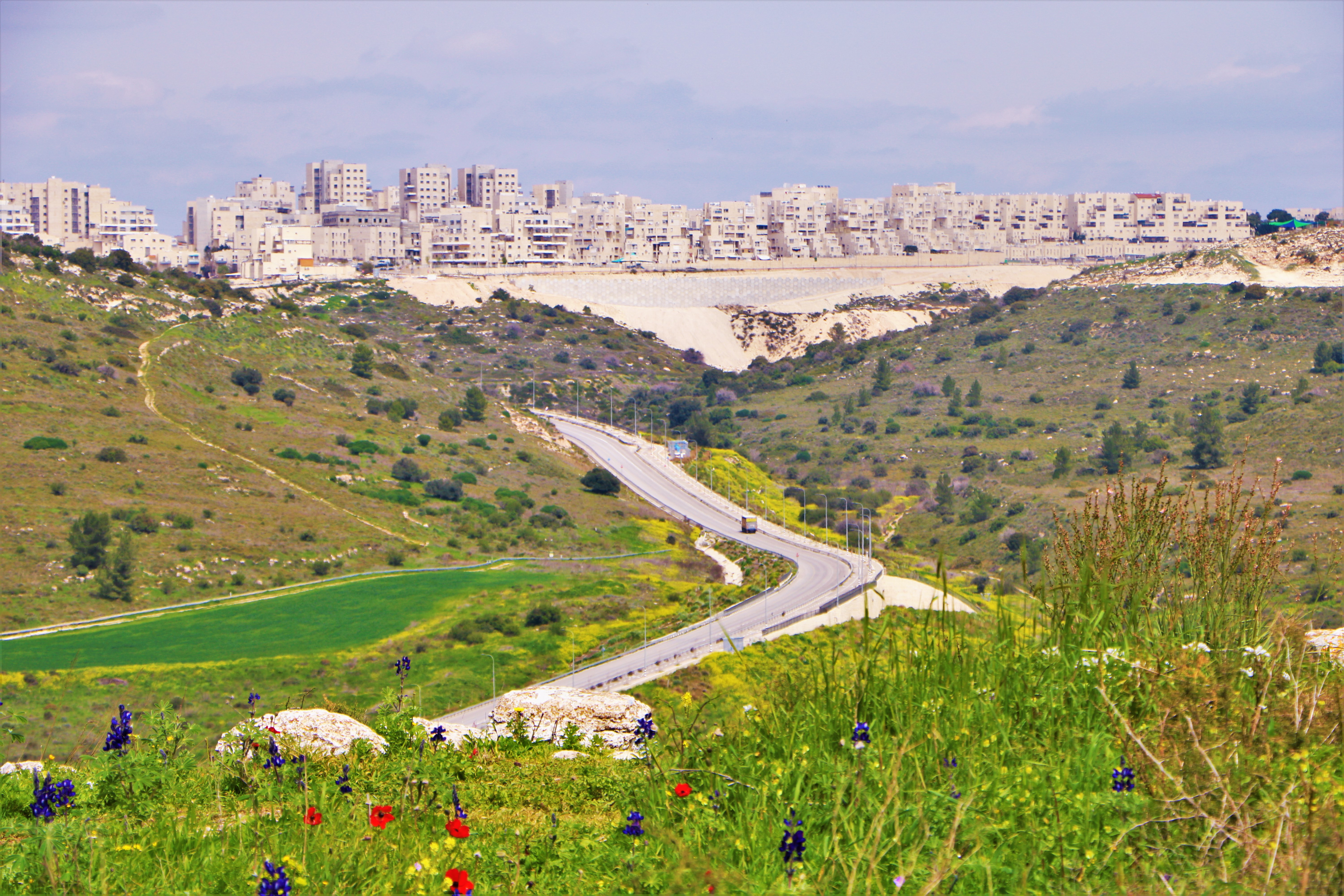
- Beit Shemesh, the largest city in the Judean Foothills Natural Region
- Country: Israel
- District: Jerusalem
- Subdistrict: None
- Largest City: Beit Shemesh

Area
  - Total: 337 km^{2} (130 sq mi)

Population (2024)
  - Total: 201,608

Ethnicity
  - Jews and others: 97.7%
  - Arabs: 0.2%

The Judean Foothills Natural Region is a natural region in the Jerusalem District of Israel. Beit Shemesh is the largest city in the natural region.

== Geography ==
Districts, Subdistricts and Natural Regions of the State of Israel, 2018

As its name suggests, the natural region consists of a large portion of Israel's Judean Foothills, also known as the Shephelah, located between the Israeli coastal plain and the Judean Mountains. It is located west of Jerusalem, east of Ashdod, and southeast of Tel Aviv. It has an area of 337 km^{2}. The largest city in the natural region is Beit Shemesh, which contains 88 percent of the natural region's population. There are no other towns in the natural region with more than 2,000 people. All localities in the natural region except for Beit Shemesh are part of the Mateh Yehuda Regional Council.

== Demographics ==
The vast majority of the residents of the natural region are Jewish. The only localities with a significant percentage of non-Jewish residents are Neve Shalom, a mixed Jewish-Arab village, and Deir Rafat, a Catholic monastery.

Historical population
| Year | Pop. | ±% |
|---|---|---|
| 1972 | 18,600 | — |
| 1983 | 23,200 | +24.7% |
| 1995 | 35,900 | +54.7% |
| 2008 | 89,340 | +148.9% |
| 2022 | 169,546 | +89.8% |
| 2024 | 201,608 | +18.9% |

== Administrative local authorities ==
| Cities | Local Councils | Villages |
|---|---|---|
| Beit Shemesh | [None] | Mateh Yehuda: Aderet; Agur; Avi'ezer; Bekoa; Deir Rafat; Eshta'ol; Gefen; Giv'at Shemesh; Giv'at Yeshayahu; Giv'ot Eden; Gizo; Harel; Kfar Uria; Kfar Zoharim; Luzit; Mahseya; Mesilat Zion; Naham; Nahshon; Nehusha; Netiv HaLamed-Heh; Neve Michael; Neve Shalom; Sdot Micha; Srigim; Tal Shahar; Ta'oz; Tarum; Tirosh; Tzafririm; Tzlafon; Tzora; Yish'i; Zanoah; Zekharia |

== Voting Patterns ==
In the 2022 election, 83 percent of voters in the natural region voted for the parties of the right-wing coalition led by Benjamin Netanyahu, while 14 percent voted for the parties of the center-left coalition led by Yair Lapid and 0.4 percent voted for the Arab parties.

In the 2026 election, 80 percent of voters in the natural region voted for the parties of the right-wing coalition led by Benjamin Netanyahu, while 13 percent voted for the parties of the center-left coalition led by Gadi Eisenkot and 0.4 percent voted for the Arab parties. An additional 1.7 percent voted for the Reservists, and 1.5 percent voted for Amcha Yisrael. Voter turnout increased 25 percent from the 2022 election.
