= Ein Kerem (disambiguation) =

Ein Kerem is a neighborhood in Jerusalem.

Ein Kerem may also refer to:

- Ein Kerem Street in Jerusalem
- Ein Kerem Agricultural School
