= Yedida =

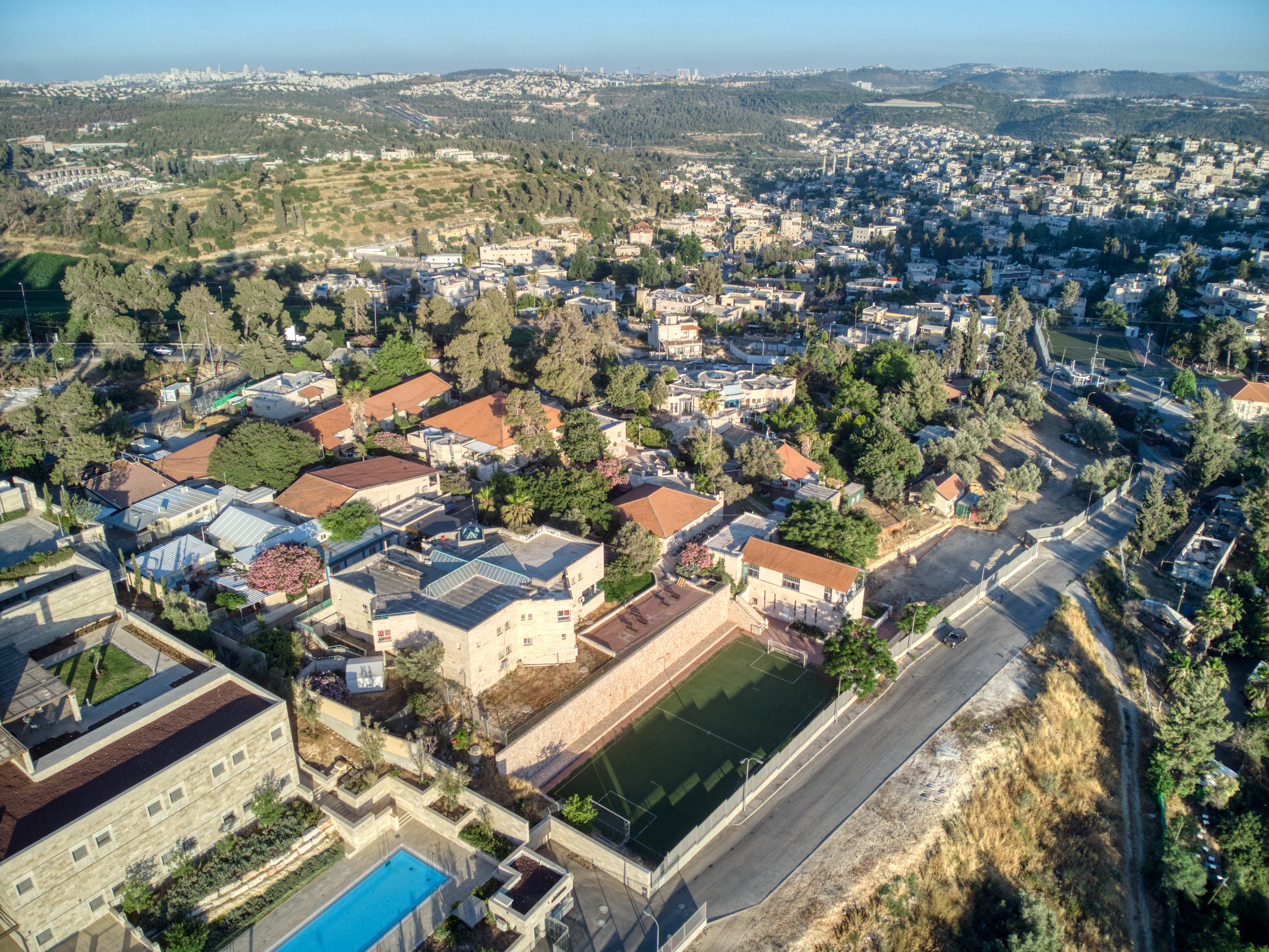

- Location within Jerusalem District
- Coordinates: 31°48′44″N 35°6′17″E
- Country: Israel
- District: Jerusalem
- Council: Mateh Yehuda
- Founded: 1964
- Population (2024): 225

Yedida (Hebrew: יְדִידָה, lit. 'Friend') is a special education institute and village in central Israel. Located between Abu Ghosh and Ma'ale HaHamisha, it falls under the jurisdiction of Mateh Yehuda Regional Council. In 2024 it had a population of 225.

== History ==
The village was established in 1964 and was named after Jedidah, the mother of Josiah. It consists of a boarding school for people at the age of 17–50.

== See also ==
- Education in Israel
