= Mateh Yehuda Regional Council =

Coordinates: 31°45′N 34°53′E

Mateh Yehuda מטה יהודה ماتيه يهودا
- Regional council (from 1964)
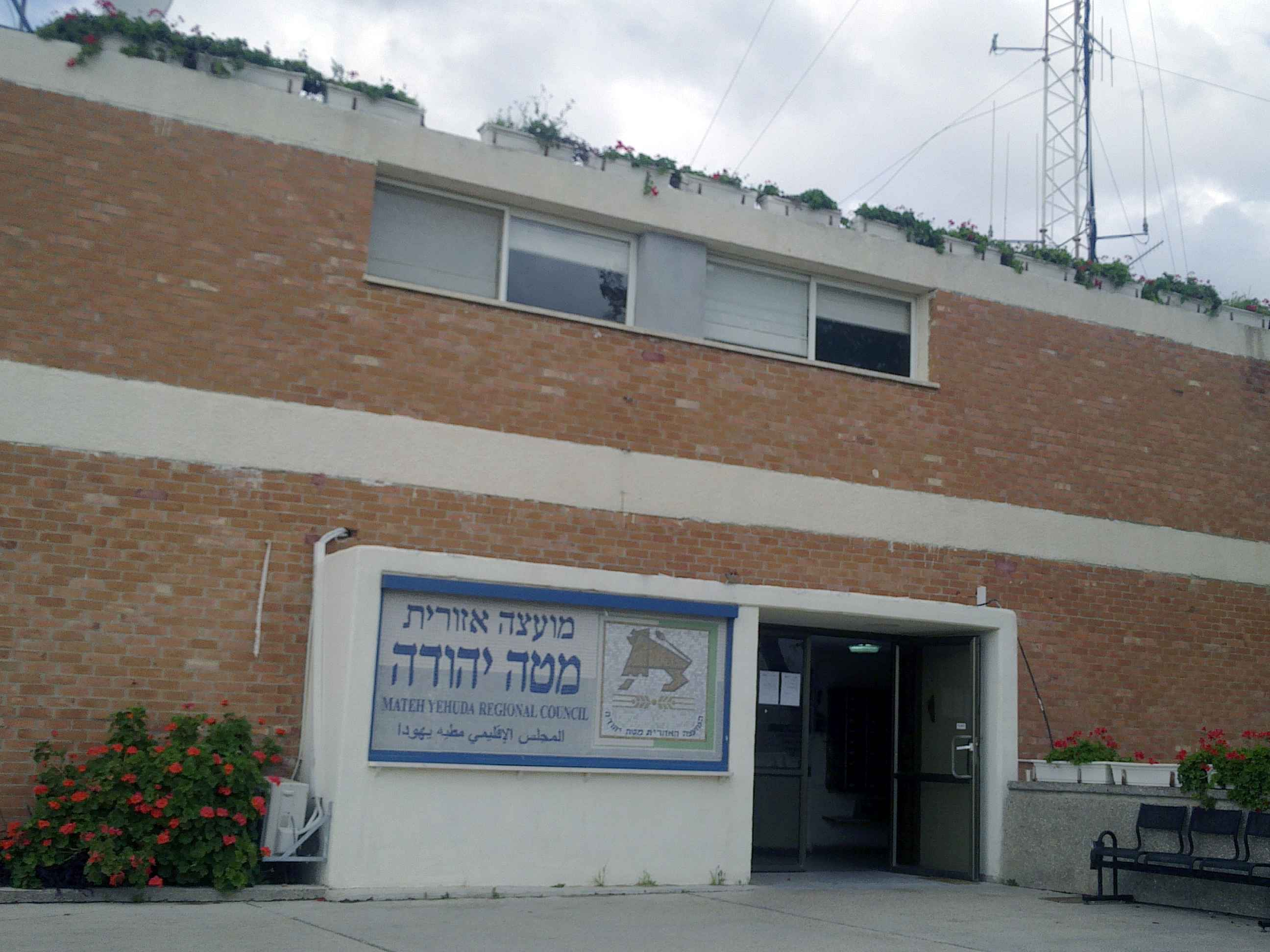
- Interactive map of Mateh Yehuda
- Country: Israel
- District: Jerusalem
- Natural region: Judean Foothills, Judean Mountains

Government
  - Head of Municipality: Niv Vizel

Area
  - Total: 480,420 dunams (480.42 km^{2}; 185.49 sq mi)

Population (2024)
  - Total: 51,125
  - Density: 106.42/km^{2} (275.62/sq mi)
- Website: www.m-yehuda.org.il

Mateh Yehuda Regional Council (Hebrew: מועצה אזורית מטה יהודה, Mo'atza Azorit Mateh Yehuda, Arabic: المجلس الإقليمي ماتيه يهودا) is a regional council in the Jerusalem District of Israel. In 2024 it was home to 51,125 people.

The name of the regional council stems from the fact that its territory was part of the land allotted to the Tribe of Judah, according to the Bible.

== Places and communities ==
The regional council administers moshavim, kibbutzim, Arab villages and other rural settlements in the Jerusalem corridor, north and south of the Jerusalem-Tel Aviv highway, from Jerusalem in the southeast to Latrun in the northwest, and down to the area of Beit Shemesh (Ha'ela Valley) in the south.

The settlements vary greatly in their character. There are religious, secular and mixed Jewish communities, two Arab communities, and the only mixed Arab–Jewish village in Israel, Neve Shalom. Many of the Jewish communities in the Mateh Yehuda district were established by immigrants from India, Yemen, Iraq, Iran and countries in Eastern Europe.

30% of the lands of the Palestinian village of Battir in the West Bank, as well as a few of its buildings, lie on the Israeli side of the Green Line. These parts of Battir are nominally within the regional council's area of jurisdiction, but authority over them is exercised by the PA municipality of Battir in practice.

=== List of villages ===
- Jewish collective villages (Kibbutzim)
  - Harel · Kiryat Anavim · Ma'ale HaHamisha · Nahshon · Netiv HaLamed-Heh · Ramat Rachel · Tzora · Tzova
- Jewish cooperative villages (Moshavim)
  - Aderet · Agur · Aminadav · Aviezer · Bar Giora · Beit Zayit · Beit Meir · Beit Nekofa · Bekoa · Eshtaol · Even Sapir · Gefen · Givat Ye'arim · Givat Yeshayahu · Kfar Uria · Kisalon · Luzit · Mevo Beitar · Mata · Mahsia · Mesilat Zion · Naham · Nehusha · Nes Harim · Neve Ilan · Neve Michael · Ora · Ramat Raziel · Sdot Micha · Sho'eva · Shoresh · Ta'oz · Tal Shahar · Tarum · Tirosh · Tzafririm · Tzelafon · Yad HaShmona · Yish'i · Zanoah · Zekharia
- Community settlements
  - Nataf · Srigim · Giv'ot Eden· Tzur Hadassah · Gizo · Motza Illit
- Arab villages
  - Ein Naqquba · Ein Rafa
- Arab-Jewish village
  - Neve Shalom
- Other settlements
  - Deir Rafat · Ein Kerem Agricultural School · Eitanim · Givat Shemesh · Kfar Zoharim · Kiryat Ye'arim Youth Village · Yedida

== Demographics ==
Historical population
Year	Pop.	±%
1972	15,300	—
1983	17,800	+16.3%
1995	21,800	+22.5%
2008	34,470	+58.1%
2022	49,704	+44.2%
2024	50,980	+2.6%

== Tourism ==
The tourist activities in the area include mountain hiking, major sections on the Israel National Trail, biking and historical sight seeing. Other attractions include natural phenomenon as Avshalom stalactites cave and natural water springs. Mate Yehuda is also home to goat cheese farms, over 30 wineries, including award-winning Katlav and Nevo, 11 breweries and dozens of artists.

== Voting Patterns ==
In the 2022 election, 47 percent of voters in the regional council voted for the parties of the right-wing coalition led by Benjamin Netanyahu, while 46 percent voted for the parties of the center-left coalition led by Yair Lapid and 7 percent voted for the Arab parties.

In the 2026 election, 47 percent of voters in the regional council voted for the parties of the center-left coalition led by Gadi Eisenkot, while 39 percent voted for the parties of the right-wing coalition led by Benjamin Netanyahu and 8 percent voted for the Arab parties. An additional 4 percent voted for the Reservists, and 2.5 percent voted for Amcha Yisrael. Voter turnout increased 15 percent from the 2022 election.

== Partnerships ==
The regional council has sister city-like partnerships with these municipalities:

- Vantaa, Finland
- Würzburg district, Bavaria, Germany
- Nümbrecht, North Rhine-Westphalia, Germany
- Dorohoi, Romania

The regional council and Beit Shemesh are linked to South Africa and Washington, D.C., in the Partnership 2gether program of the Jewish Agency for Israel.
