= Givat Shemesh =

Givat Shemesh: גבעת שמש (Hebrew); جفعات شيمش (Arabic)
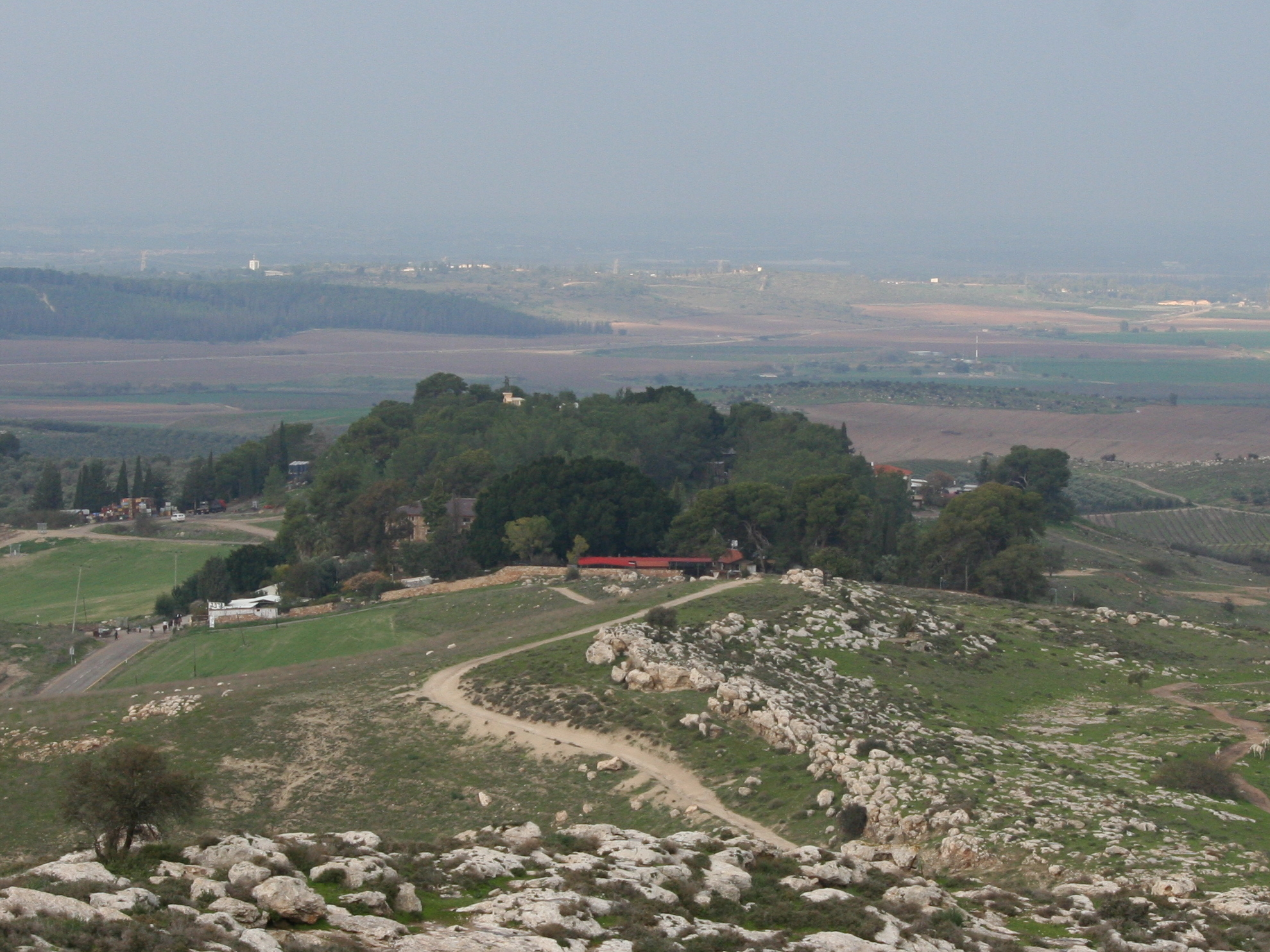

- Location within Jerusalem District
- Coordinates: 31°46′27″N 34°57′2″E
- Country: Israel
- District: Jerusalem
- Council: Mateh Yehuda
- Founded: 1954
- Population (2021): 56
- Website: www.retorno.org

Givat Shemesh (Hebrew: גִּבְעַת שֶׁמֶשׁ, lit. Sun Hill) is a village and drug rehabilitation centre in central Israel. Located near Beit Shemesh above kibbutz Tzora and run by the Retorno organisation, it falls under the jurisdiction of Mateh Yehuda Regional Council. In 2021 it had a population of 56.

== History ==
Givat Shemesh is located on the land of the depopulated Arab village of Dayr Rafat, just west of the village site. Dayr Rafat, along with four other villages, were overtaken by Israeli forces on 17–18 July 1948, in the midst of the 1948 Arab-Israeli War. The villages had been on the front line since April 1948 and most of the inhabitants had already left the area and the few who remained at each village were expelled.

The Retorno rehabilitation centre was established in 1989 in Mexico by Rabbi Eitan Eckstein, and later opened in Israel. The centre has elements of Judaism in and around the therapy program and religious practice is the general lifestyle in the centre.

== See also ==
- Education in Israel
