= Sho'eva =

Sho'eva: שואבה (Hebrew)
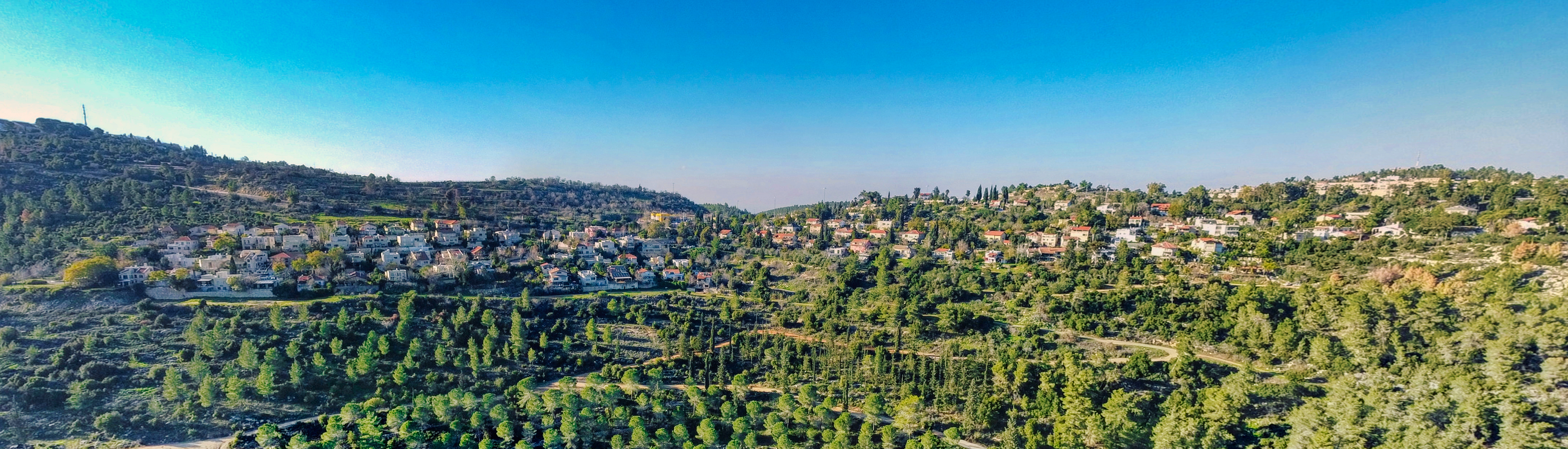

- Location within Jerusalem District
- Coordinates: 31°47′54″N 35°4′41″E
- Country: Israel
- District: Jerusalem
- Council: Mateh Yehuda
- Affiliation: Agricultural Union
- Founded: 1950
- Founder: Yemenite Jews
- Population (2024): 579

Sho'eva (Hebrew: שׁוֹאֵבָה) is a moshav in central Israel. Located west of Jerusalem, it falls under the jurisdiction of Mateh Yehuda Regional Council. In 2024 it had a population of 579.

== History ==
The moshav was established as a work village in 1950 by immigrants from Yemen. The chosen site had previously belonged to the Arab village of Saris, which was destroyed in 1948 during the 1948 Arab-Israeli War. In 1952 settlement planning authorities decided that the village had been established by mistake and demanded that the settlers vacate. When they refused, the water supply and other services were reduced to motivate the residents to leave. Although the village closed in 1952, it was re-established in 1959.
