= Kfar Zoharim =

Kfar Zoharim: כפר זוהרים (Hebrew)
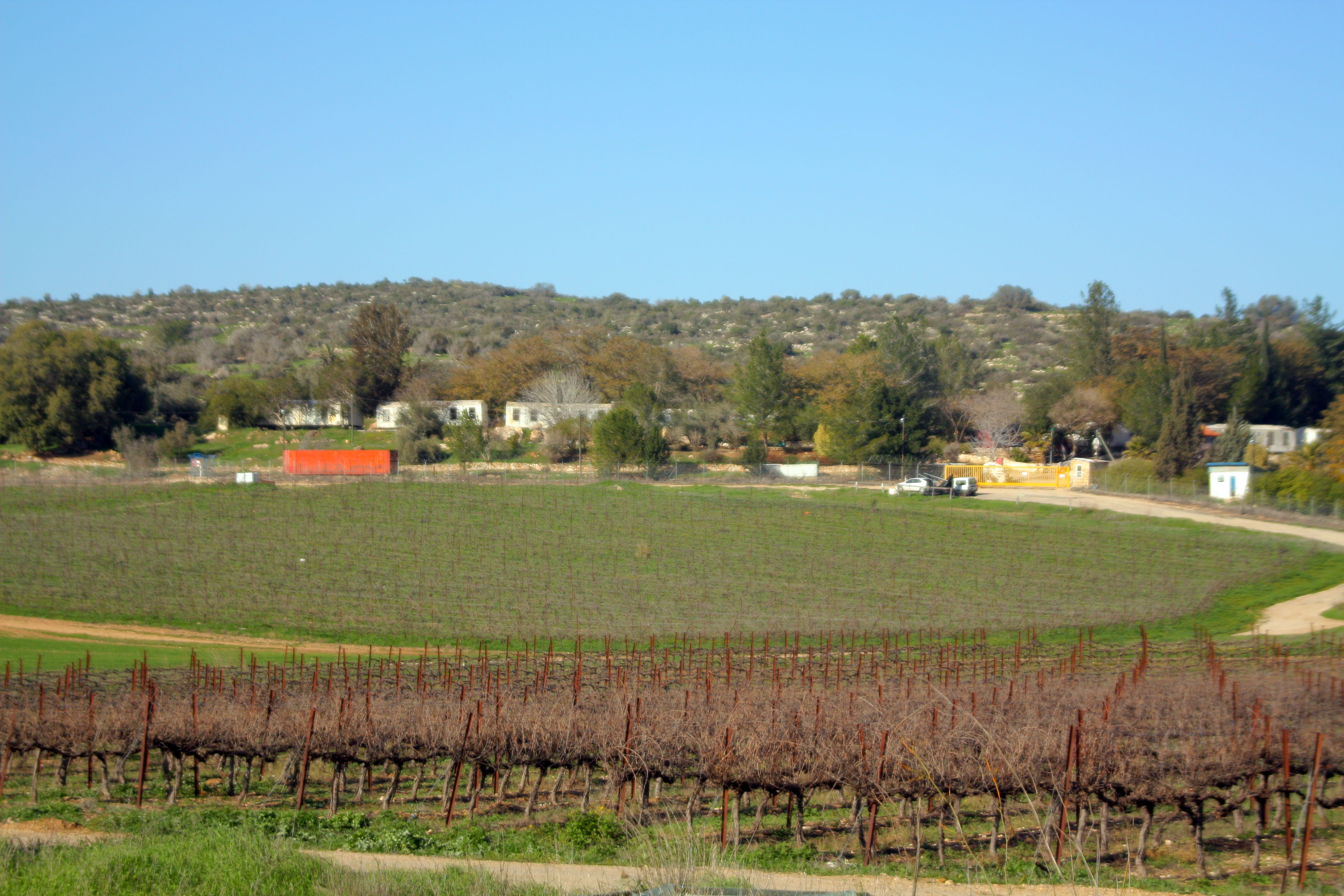

- Location within Jerusalem District
- Coordinates: 31°37′21″N 34°55′32″E
- Country: Israel
- District: Jerusalem
- Council: Mateh Yehuda
- Founded: 1993
- Founder: Jerusalem residents
- Population (2024): 160
- Website: www.ry-zoharim.org

Kfar Zoharim (Hebrew: כְּפַר זָהֳרִים, lit. 'Village of Lights'), officially Ramot Yehuda-Zoharim (Hebrew: רמות יהודה-זוהרים, lit. 'Judea Heights-Lights'), is an Israeli educational therapy youth village for teenagers aged 14–18 from the ultra-Orthodox community who do not fit into regular educational frameworks. It falls under the jurisdiction of Mateh Yehuda Regional Council. In 2024 it had a population of 160.

== History ==
The village was established in 1993 by former members of the Black Panthers. It was named after the singer Zohar Argov, a drug addict. The village was managed by Ramot Yehuda, an organization that received funding from the National Authority for the War on Drugs. The treatment program lasted a year and a half. There was also an emergency center for drug addicts.

In 2012 it was taken over by Israel Prize laureate Rabbi Yitzchak David Grossman and adapted to the needs of the ultra-Orthodox community.
