= Zanoah =

Zanoah: זנוח (Hebrew); زنواح (Arabic)
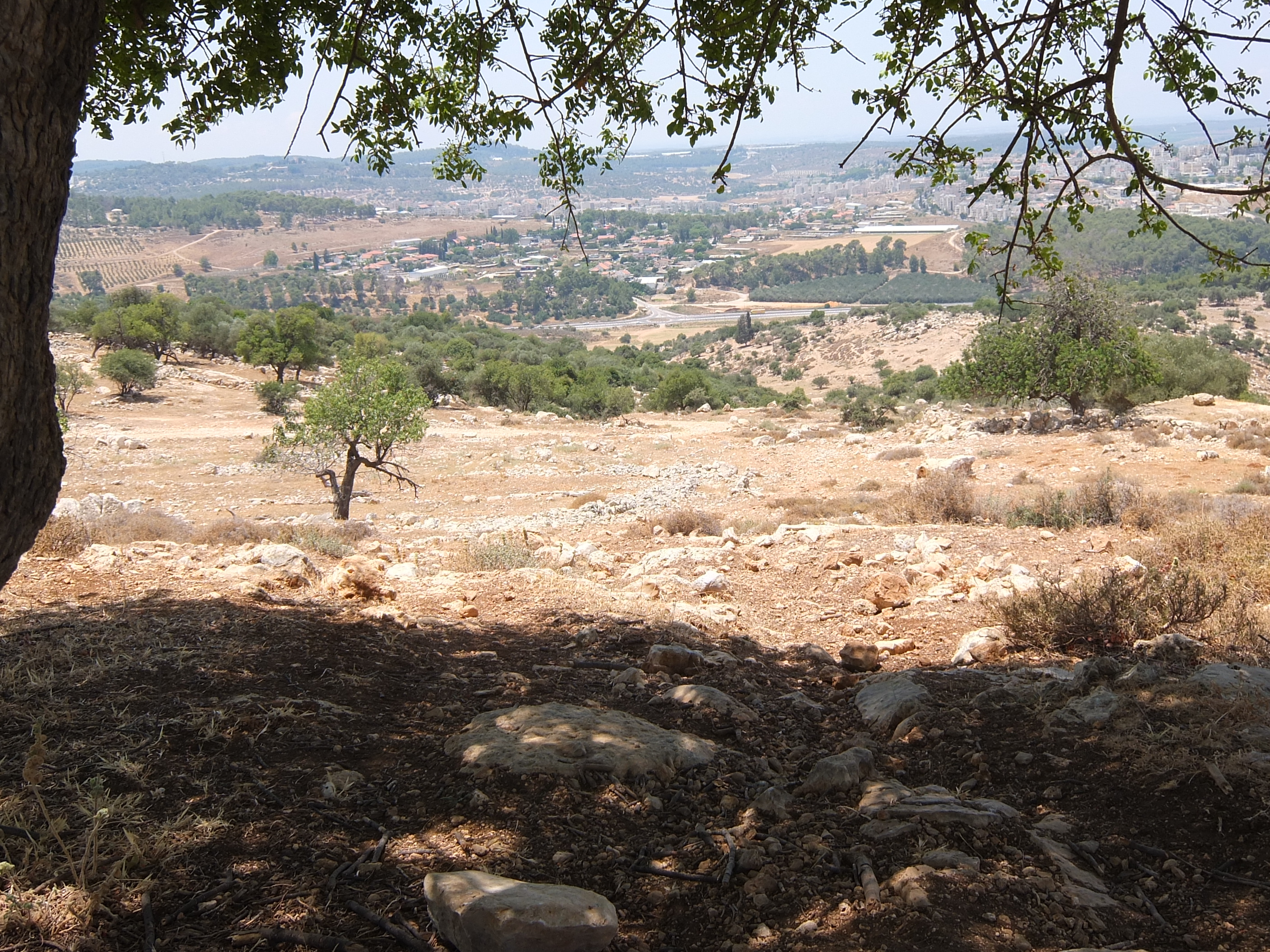

- Location within Jerusalem District
- Coordinates: 31°43′56″N 34°59′57″E
- Grid position: 150125 PAL
- Country: Israel
- District: Jerusalem
- Council: Mateh Yehuda
- Affiliation: Poalei Agudat Yisrael
- Founded: 1950
- Founder: Yemenite Jews
- Population (2024): 484

Zanoah (Hebrew: זָנוֹחַ) is a moshav in central Israel. Located adjacent to Beit Shemesh, it falls under the jurisdiction of Mateh Yehuda Regional Council. In 2024 it had a population of 484.

== Modern history ==
The village was established in 1950 by immigrants from Yemen, and was initially named Dayraban Gimel after the nearby depopulated Palestinian village of Dayr Aban. Subsequently, the moshav was renamed Zanoah after the ancient biblical settlement in the Judean Lowlands, mentioned in the Book of Joshua (15:33-34). It is possible that this settlement appears in the Amarna letters under the name "Zano". The ancient settlement is identified with Khurbet Zanuʻ, 1 km south of the moshav. In the following years the founders left and were replaced by immigrants from Morocco.

== Education ==
The Beit Shemesh Yeshiva is located in Zanoah. Most of the students are from Ramat Beit Shemesh Alef. Aside from Talmud study, the curriculum includes English language and mathematics, and unlike many such institutions in Israel today, students study for the Bagrut matriculation exams. From 2004 to 2015, when it closed, Zanoah was also the home of Yeshivat Yesodei HaTorah, which offered a gap year program for international English-speaking students.

== History of archaeological site ==
The old site lies on a hill, adjacent to the watercourse Nahal Zanoah, a stream that runs north and drains into Nahal Sorek. Although listed in Joshua 15:34 as being a city in the plain, it is actually partly in the hill country, partly in the plain.

The ruins of Khurbet Zanuʻ which lie on a high hill south of the moshav are thought to be the ancient village of Zanoah, mentioned in Egyptian letters, later part of the tribe of Judah (Joshua 15:34), and in the "Second Temple period ... reinhabited," as recorded in the Bible (Nehemiah 3:13). (Note: There were two towns bearing the same name; one in the Shefelah of Judah, called זנוח (Zanoah), and the other in the mountainous district of Judah, also called זנוח (Zanoah)) During the 1st-century CE, the village was known by the name Zenoha.

An overhead power line now runs through the ancient site. The site reeks with antiquity, with the signs of an old settlement everywhere. The area of the old settlement is extensive, with razed structures that once stood as walls and houses. Shards of broken pottery are strewn extensively throughout the grounds, with several open-mouthed cisterns and antres.

Zanoah is mentioned in the Book of Nehemiah as one of the towns resettled by the Jewish exiles returning from the Babylonian captivity and who helped to construct the walls of Jerusalem during the reign of the Persian king, Artaxerxes I (Xerxes). Nehemiah further records that those returnees were the very descendants of the people who had formerly resided in the town before their banishment from the country, who had all returned to live in their former places of residence. Whether the reference there refers to the Zanoah in the Shefelah (Joshua 15:34) or to the Zanoah in the Judaean mountains (now known as Khirbet Zanuta) is now unclear, as there were two places by the same name. Based on the archaeological evidence, Zanoah in the Shefelah was a settled village during the Persian period.

According to the Mishnah, compiled in the 2nd-century CE (Munich MS., Menahot 83b), the finest of the wheat used to grow in the valley adjacent to Zanoah, from whence it was taken for the Omer offering in the Temple.

Eusebius (3rd–4th century CE) mentions Zanoah in his Onomasticon as a village "within the borders of Eleutheropolis (Beit Gubrin) on the way to Ailia (Jerusalem)," and which was still inhabited in his day.

C.R. Conder and H.H. Kitchener described the ruins of Khurbet Zanûa, visited by them in 1881.

An archaeological survey of the site was conducted in 2008 by Pablo Betzer on behalf of the Israel Antiquities Authority (IAA). The site has never been excavated.

== Gallery of the nearby Zanoah Ruin (Kh. Zanua) ==
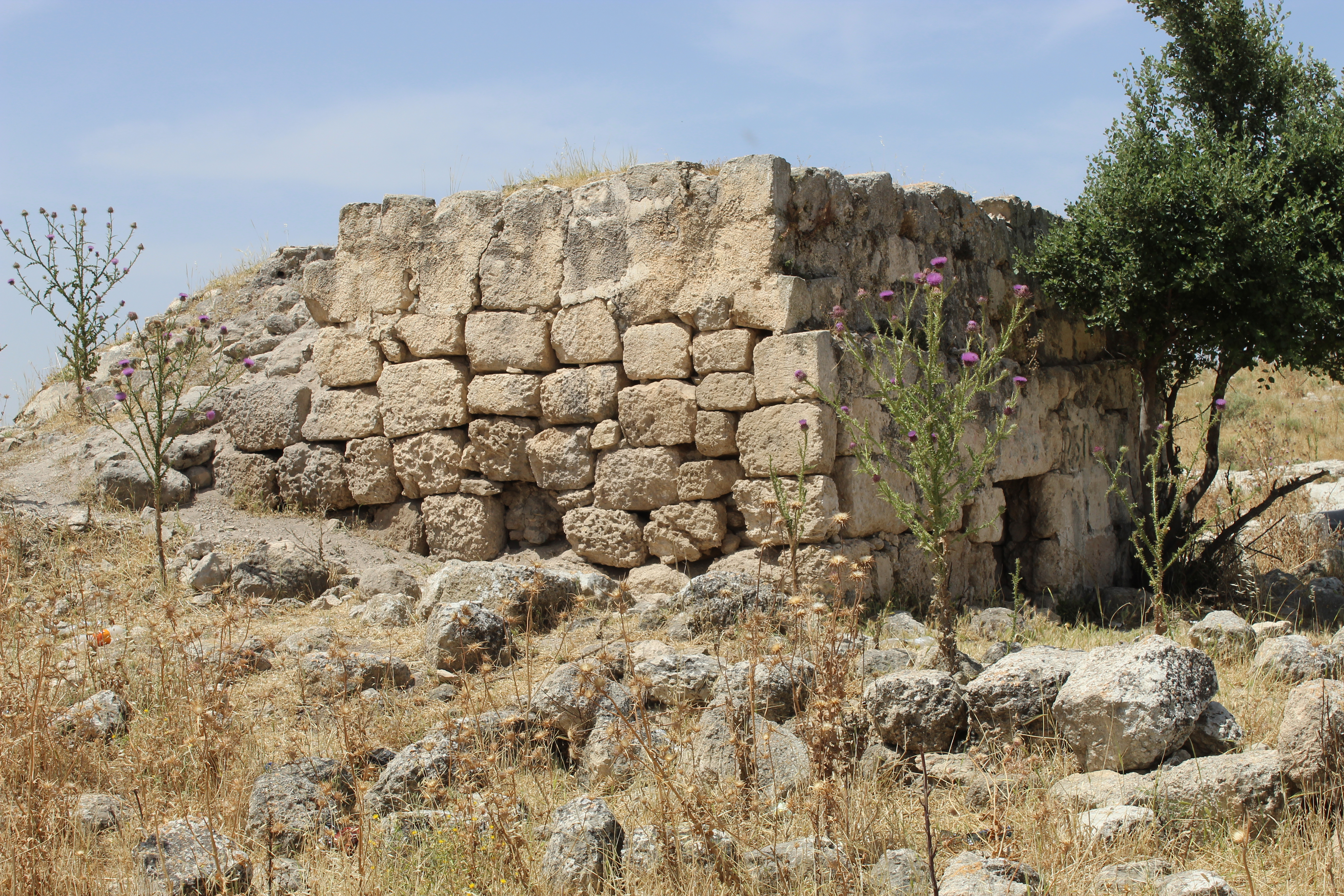
Zanoah ruin, old house of recycled stones

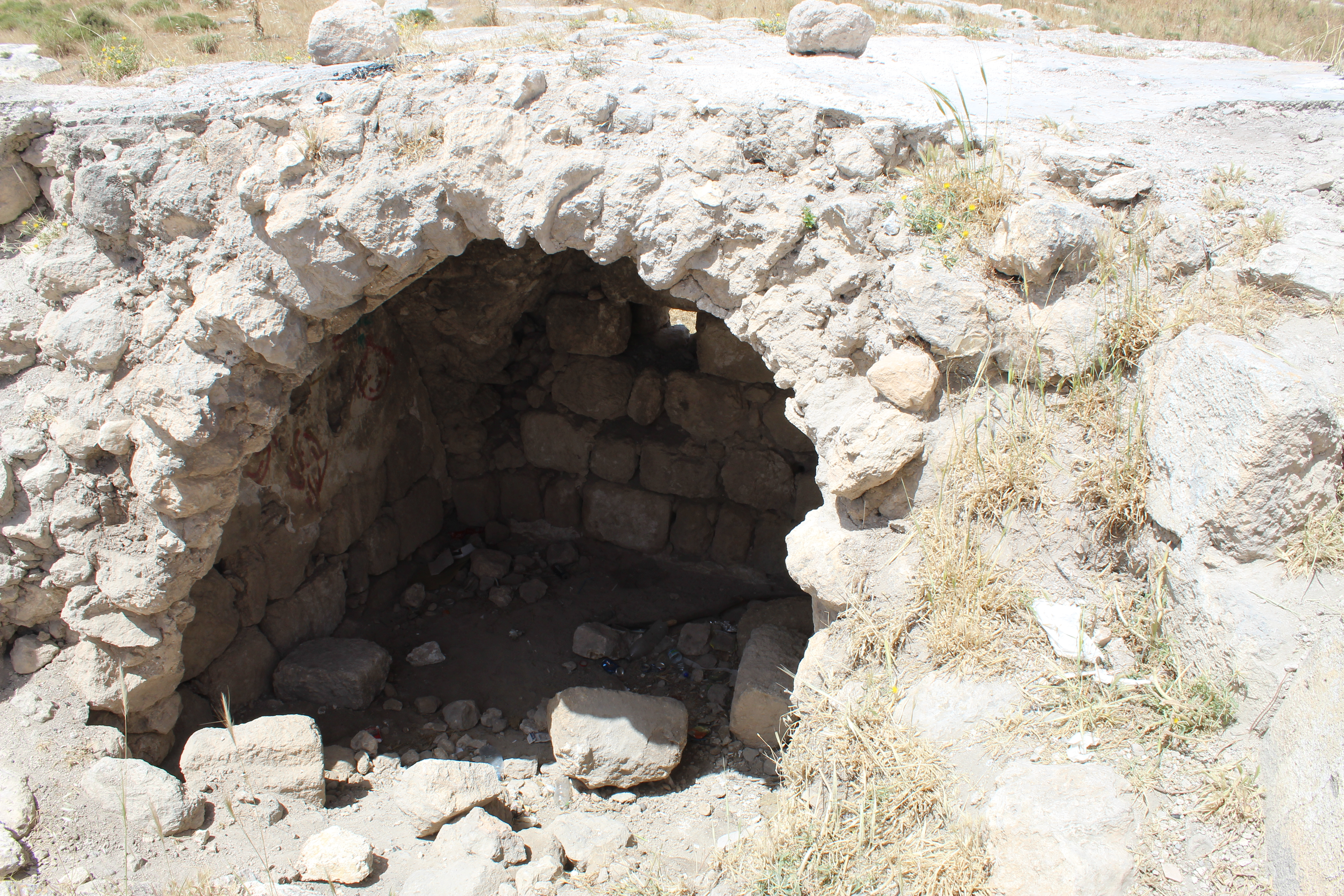
Arched doorway, Kh. Zanua (Old Zanoah)

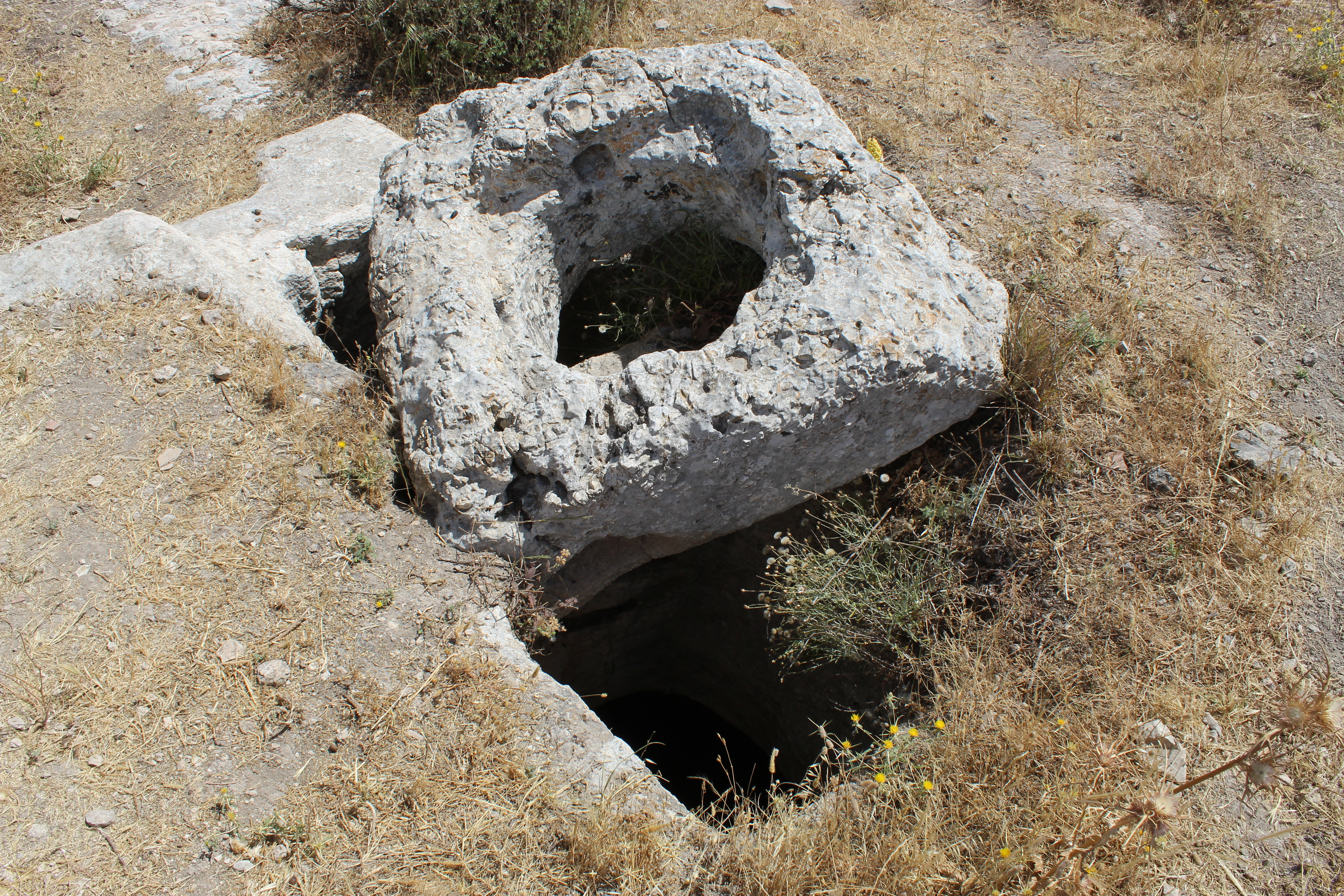
Voussoir stone in Zanoah

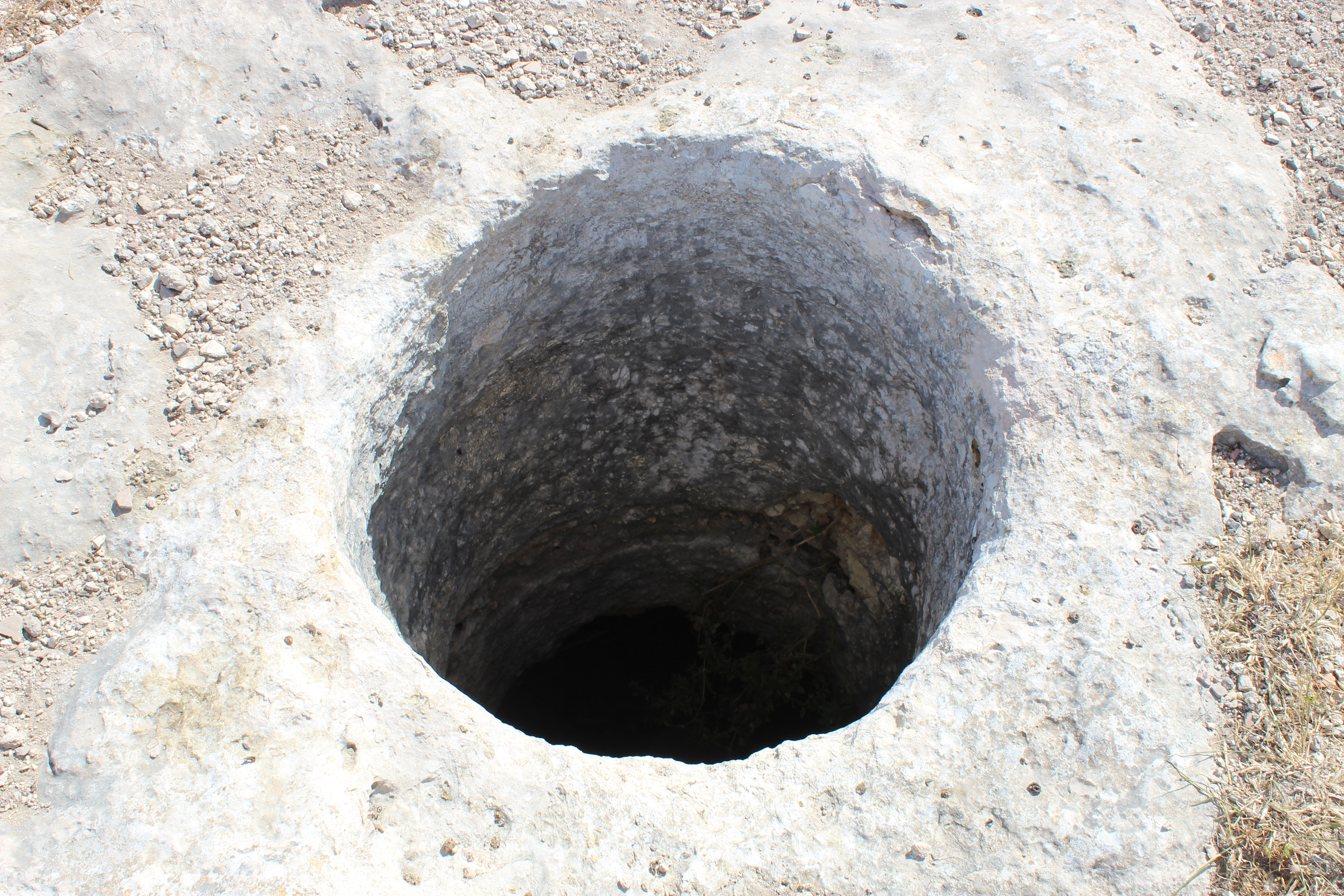
Gaping hole in cistern at the Zanoah Ruin

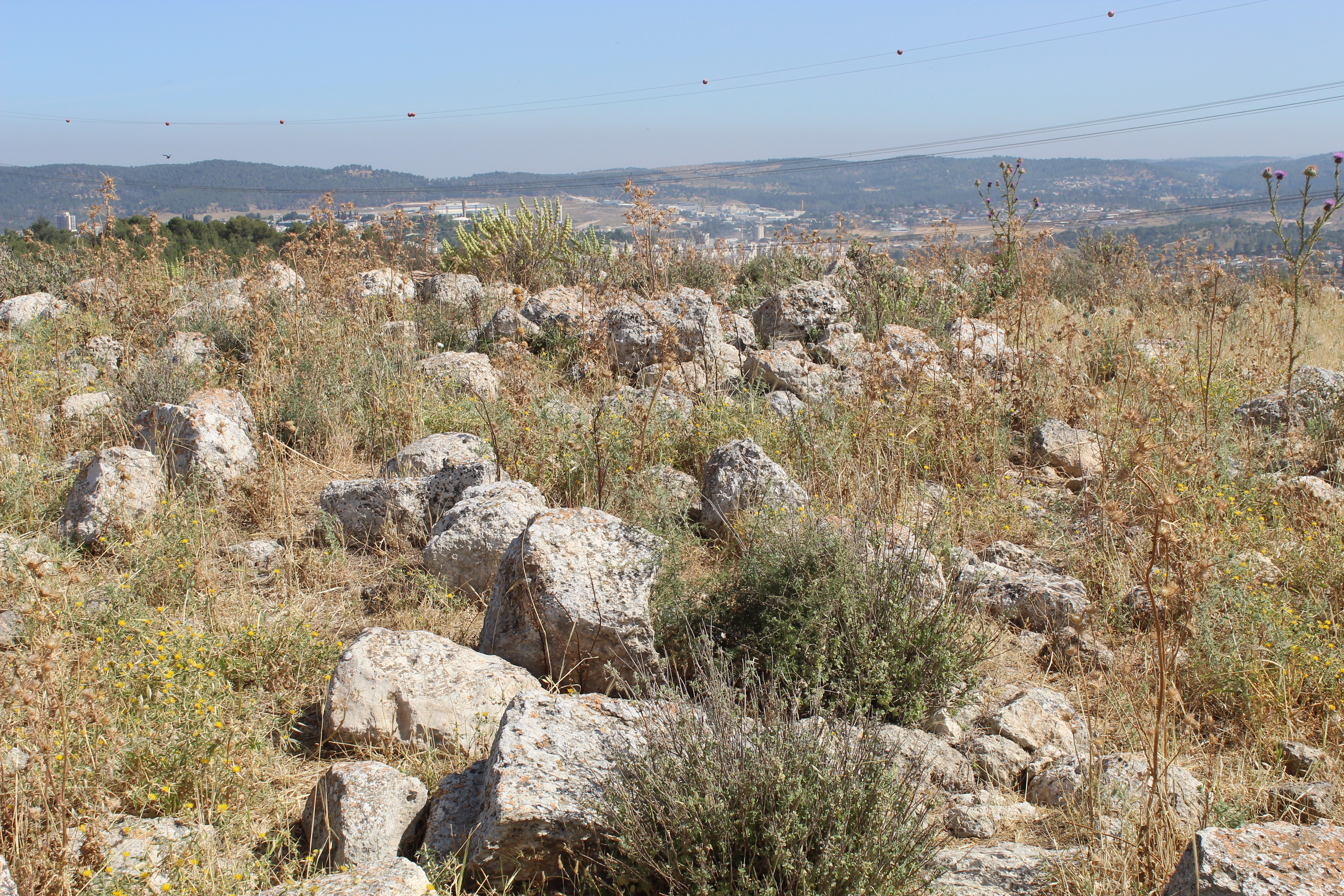
General view of ruins at the Zanoah ruin (Khurbet Zanua)

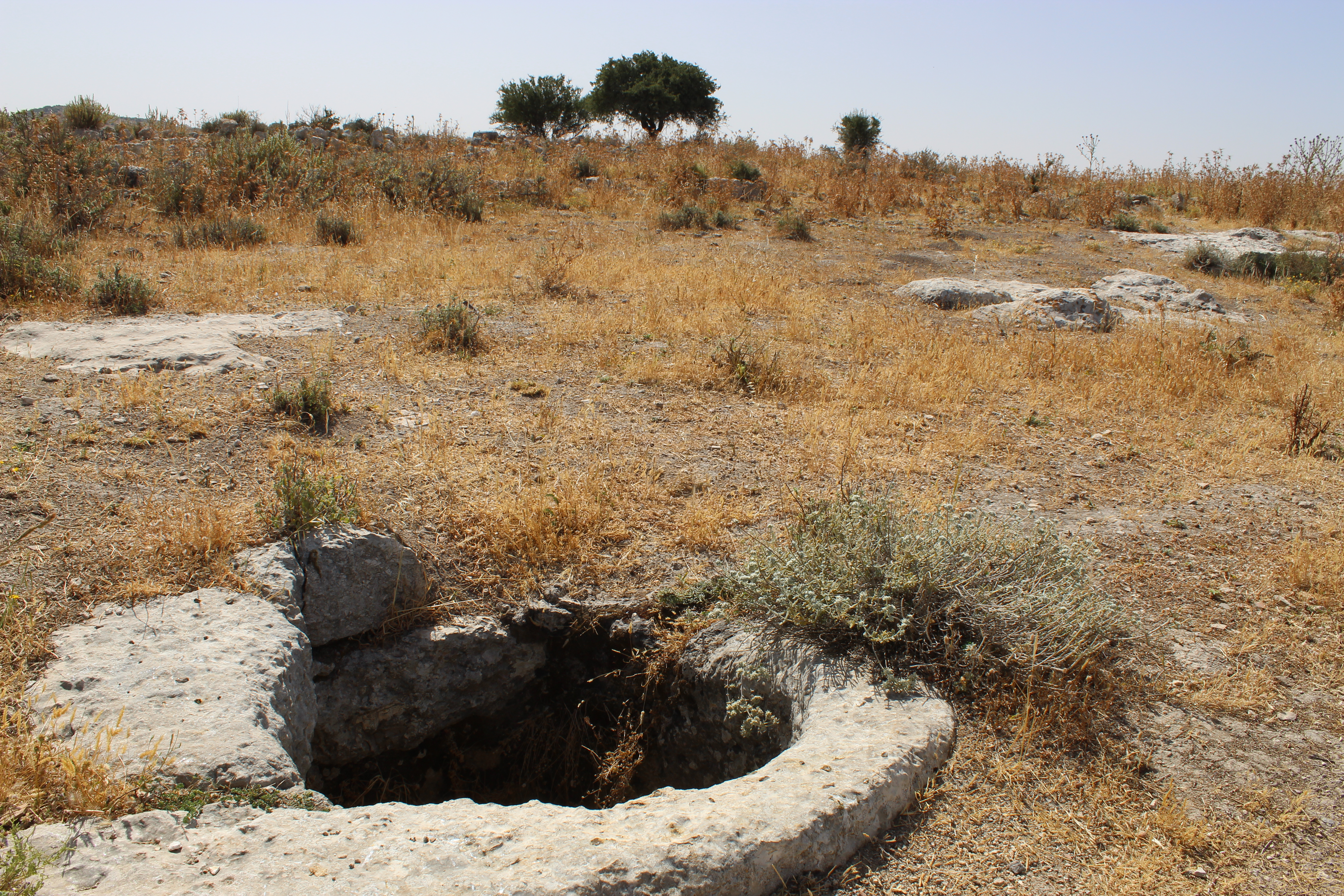
Open cistern at the Zanoah ruin

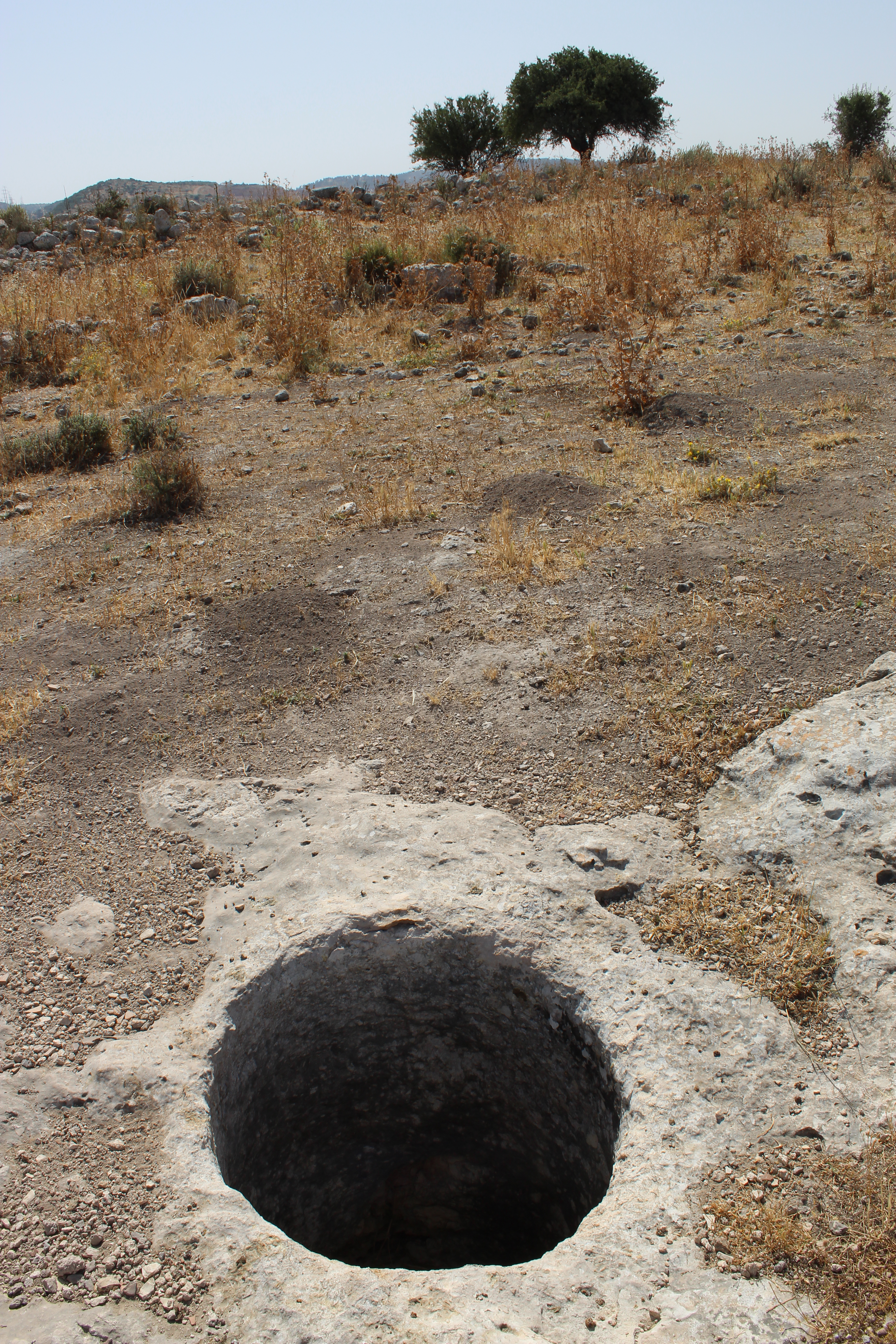
Open pit in the Old Zanoah

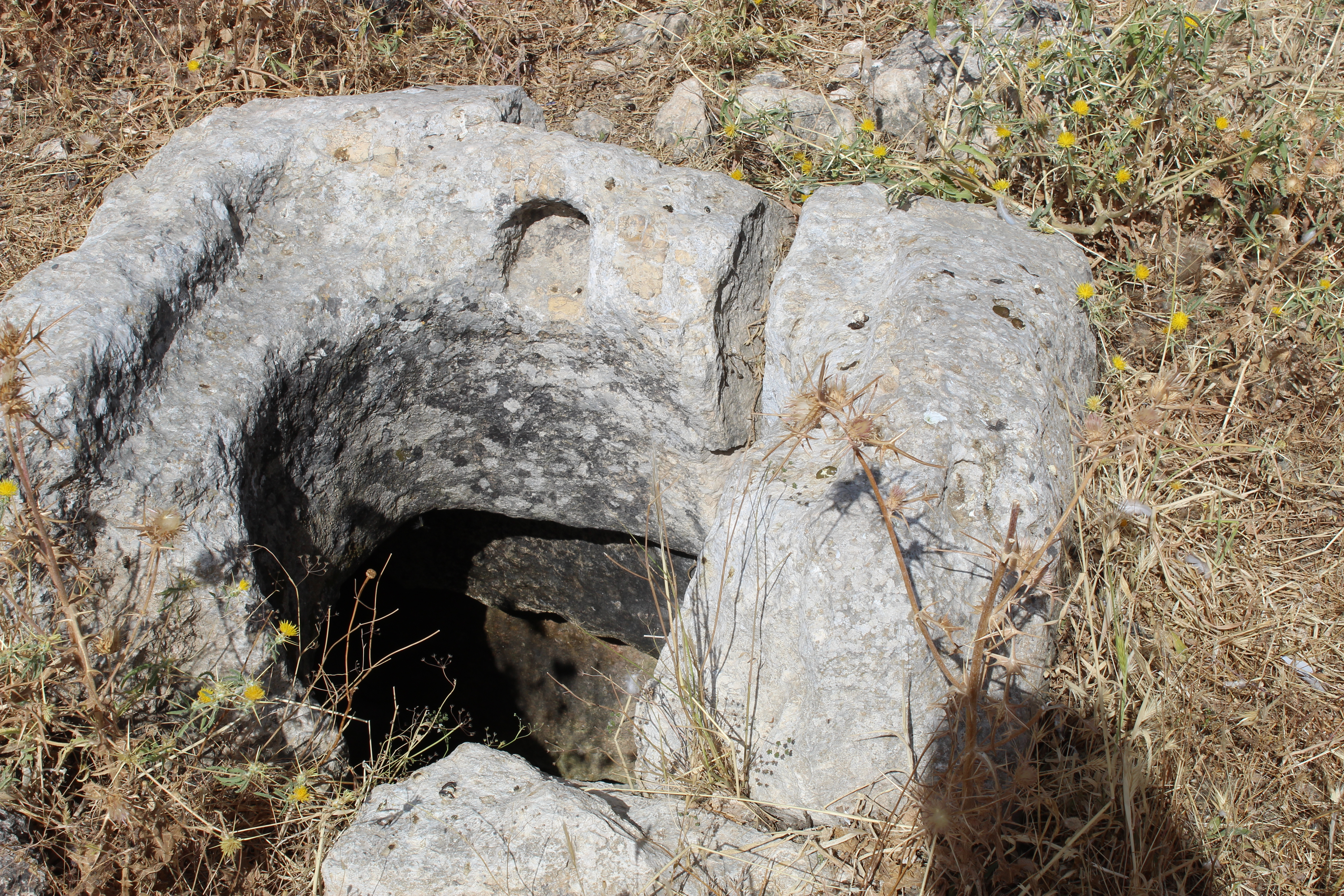
Stone covering of cistern

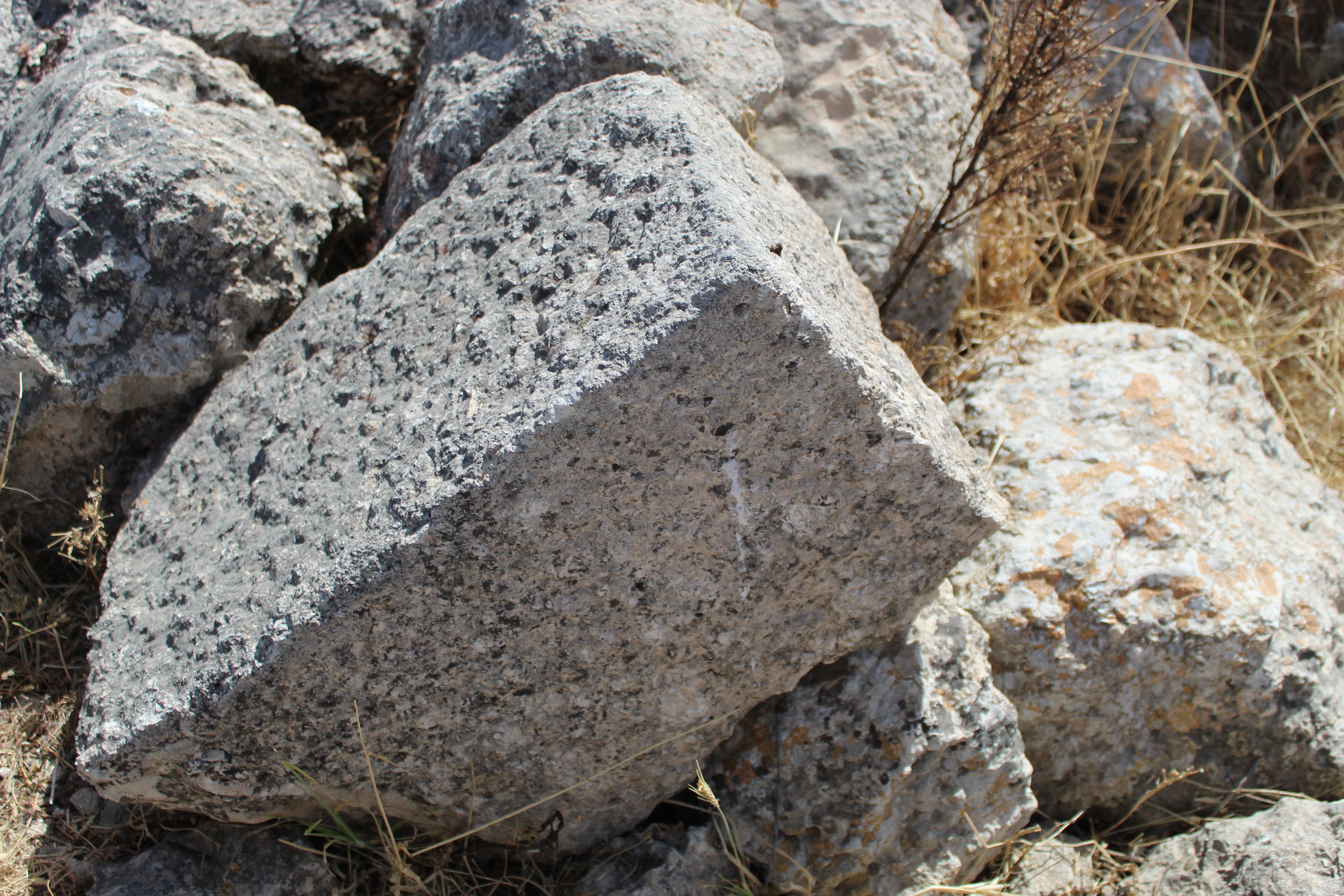
Razed blocks of hewn stones at Zanoah

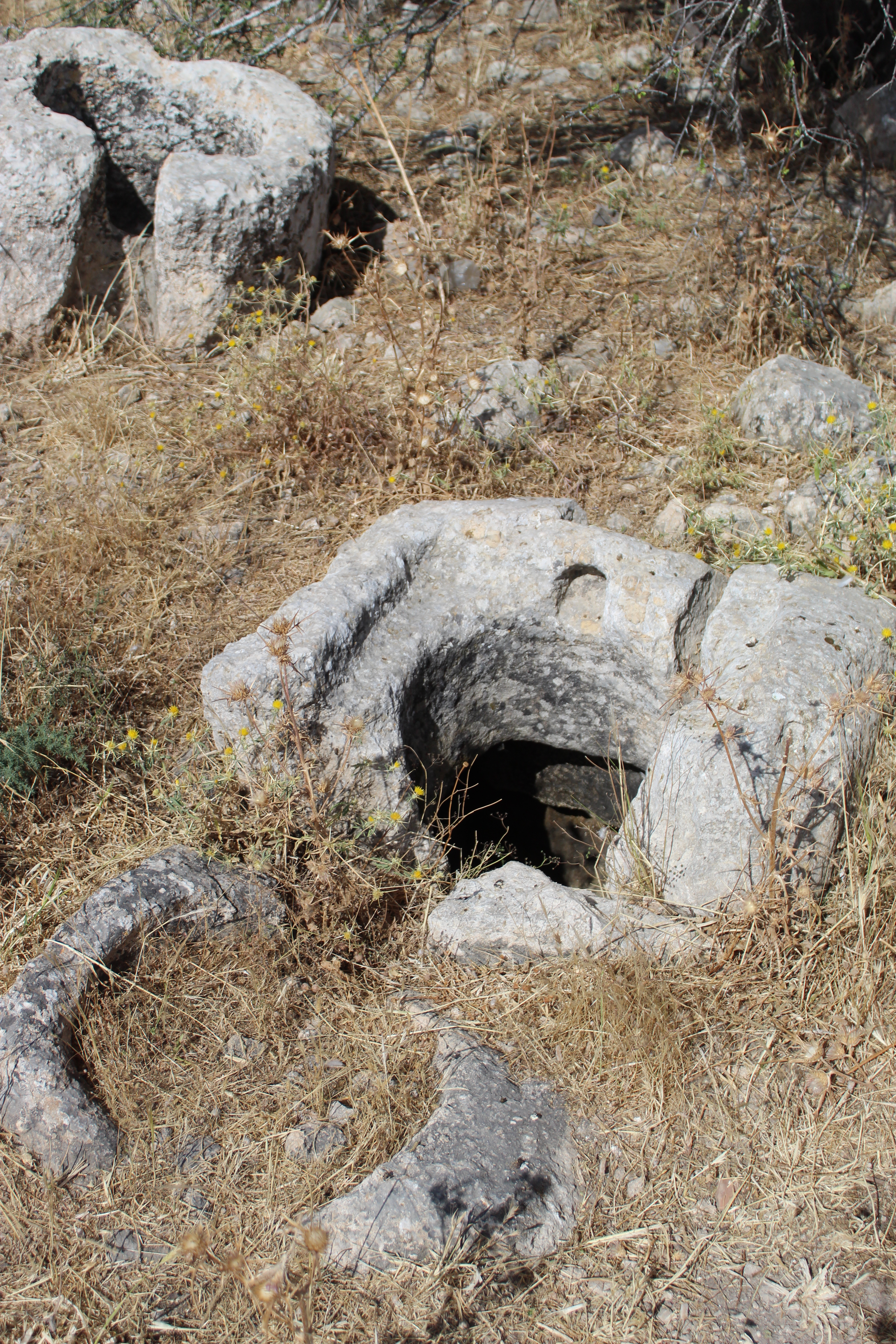
Stone relics at ruin of Zanoah

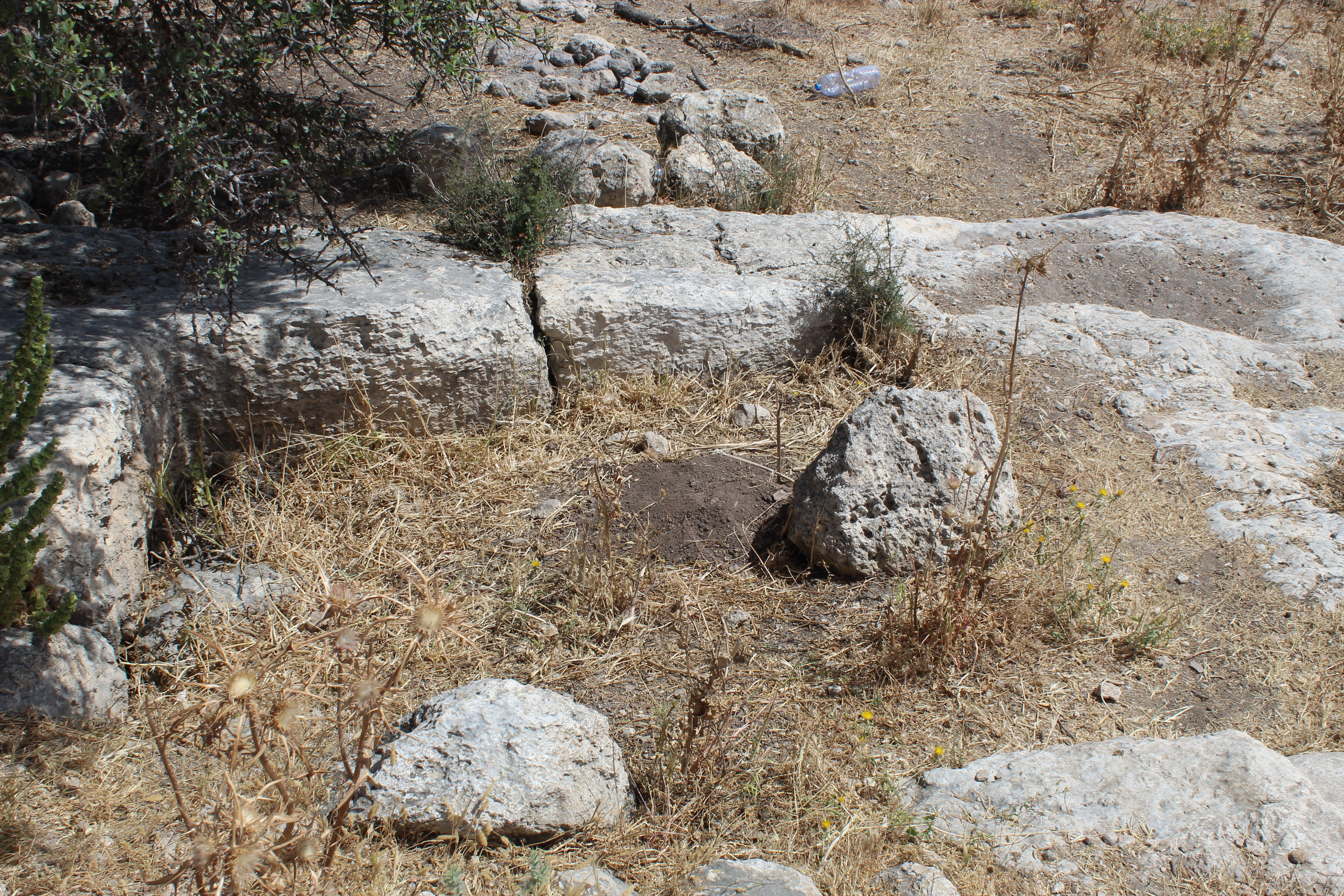
Rock-carved foundation of house in the Zanoah ruin

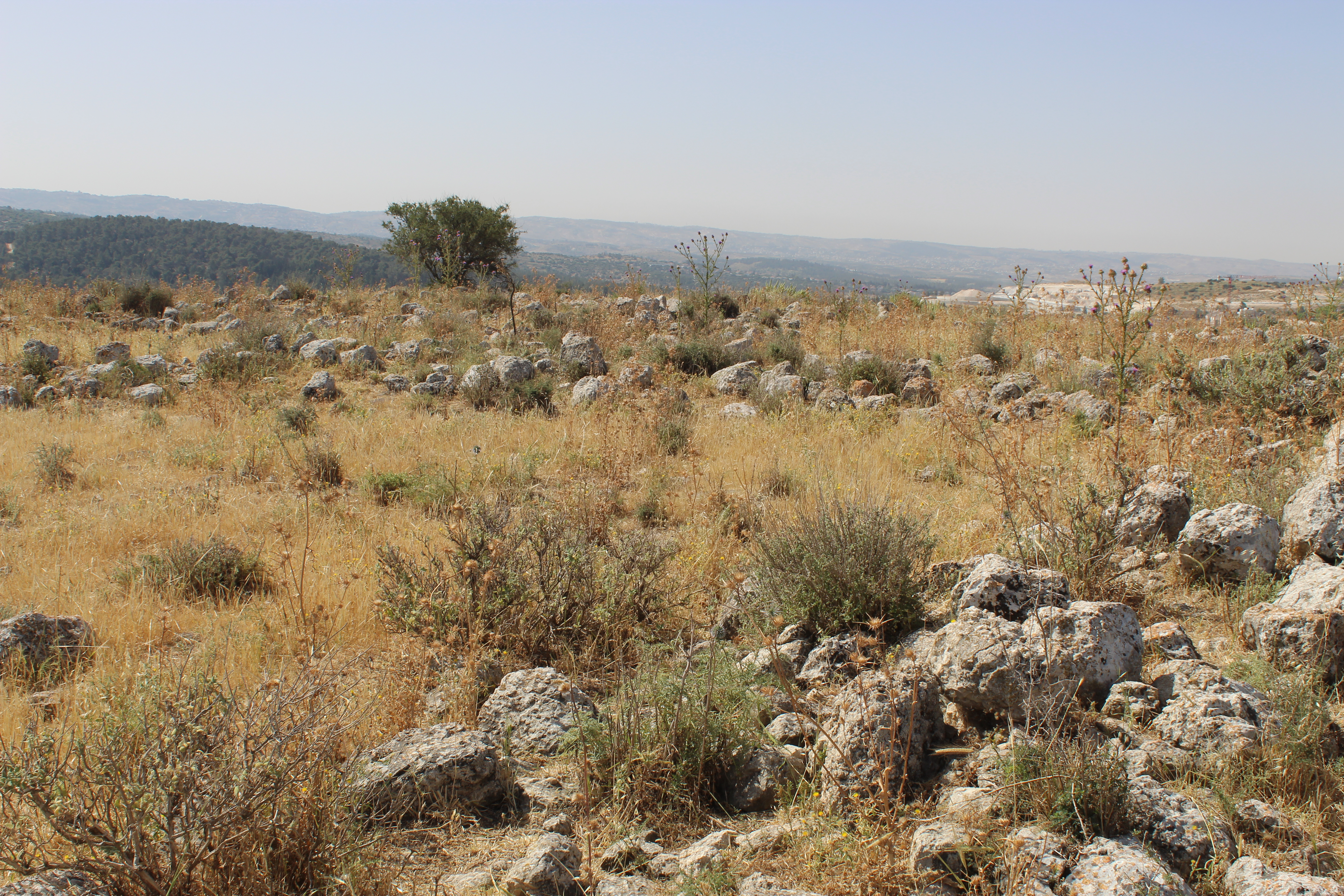
General view of ruins at Khurbet Zanua (Zanoah)

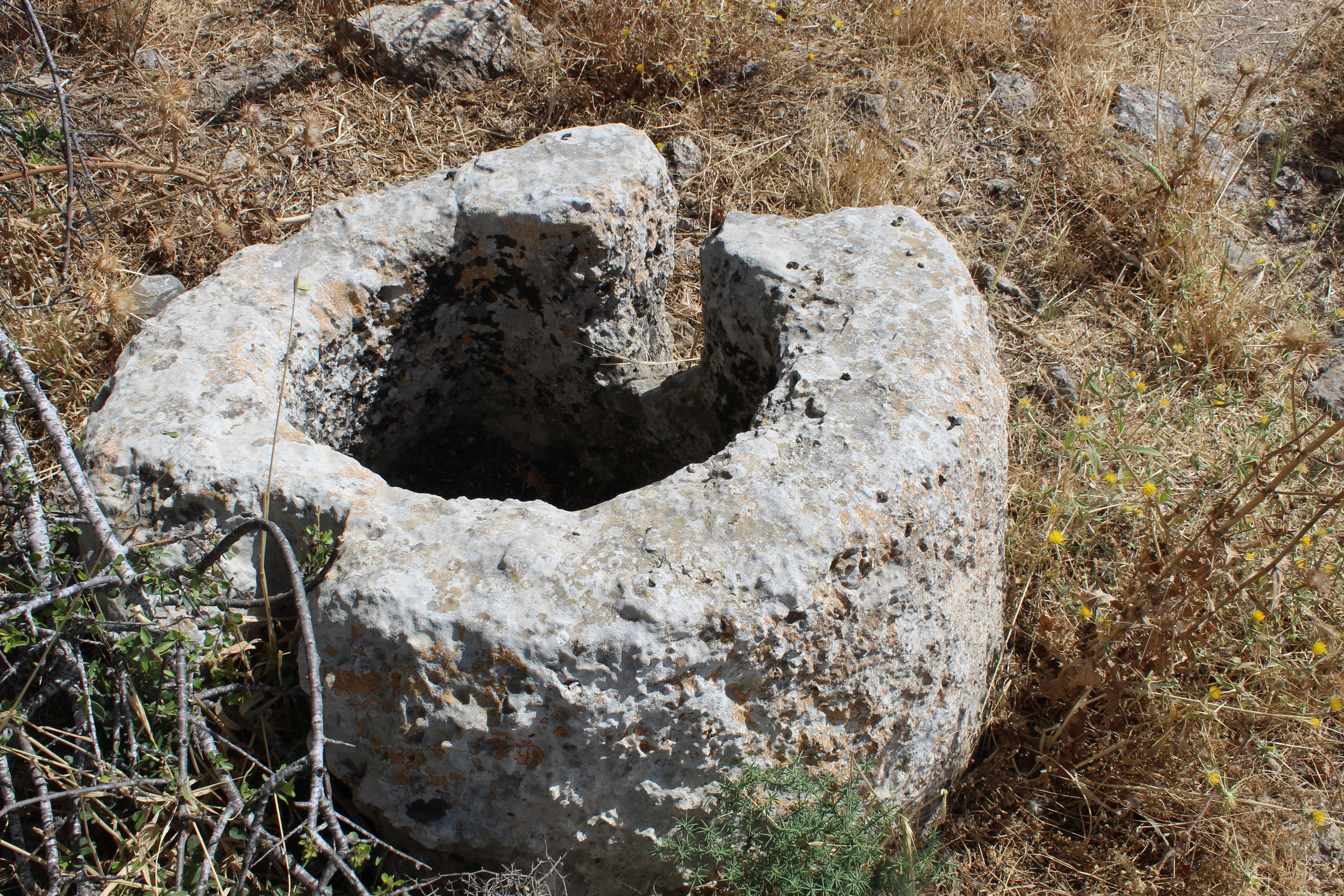
Stone relic of Zanoah

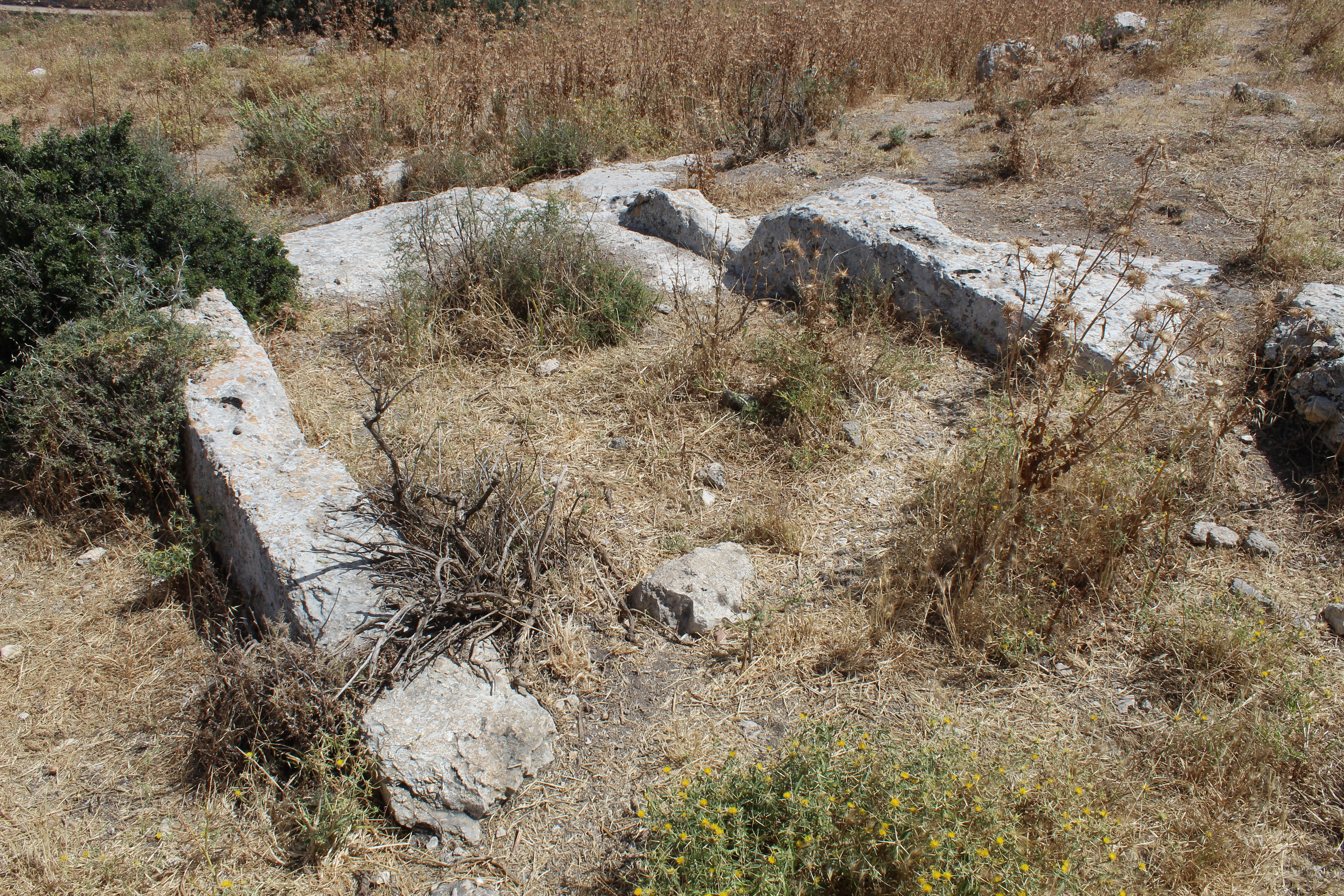
House foundation at Kh. Zanoah
