= Neve Ilan =

Neve Ilan: נוה אילן (Hebrew); نفي إيلان (Arabic)
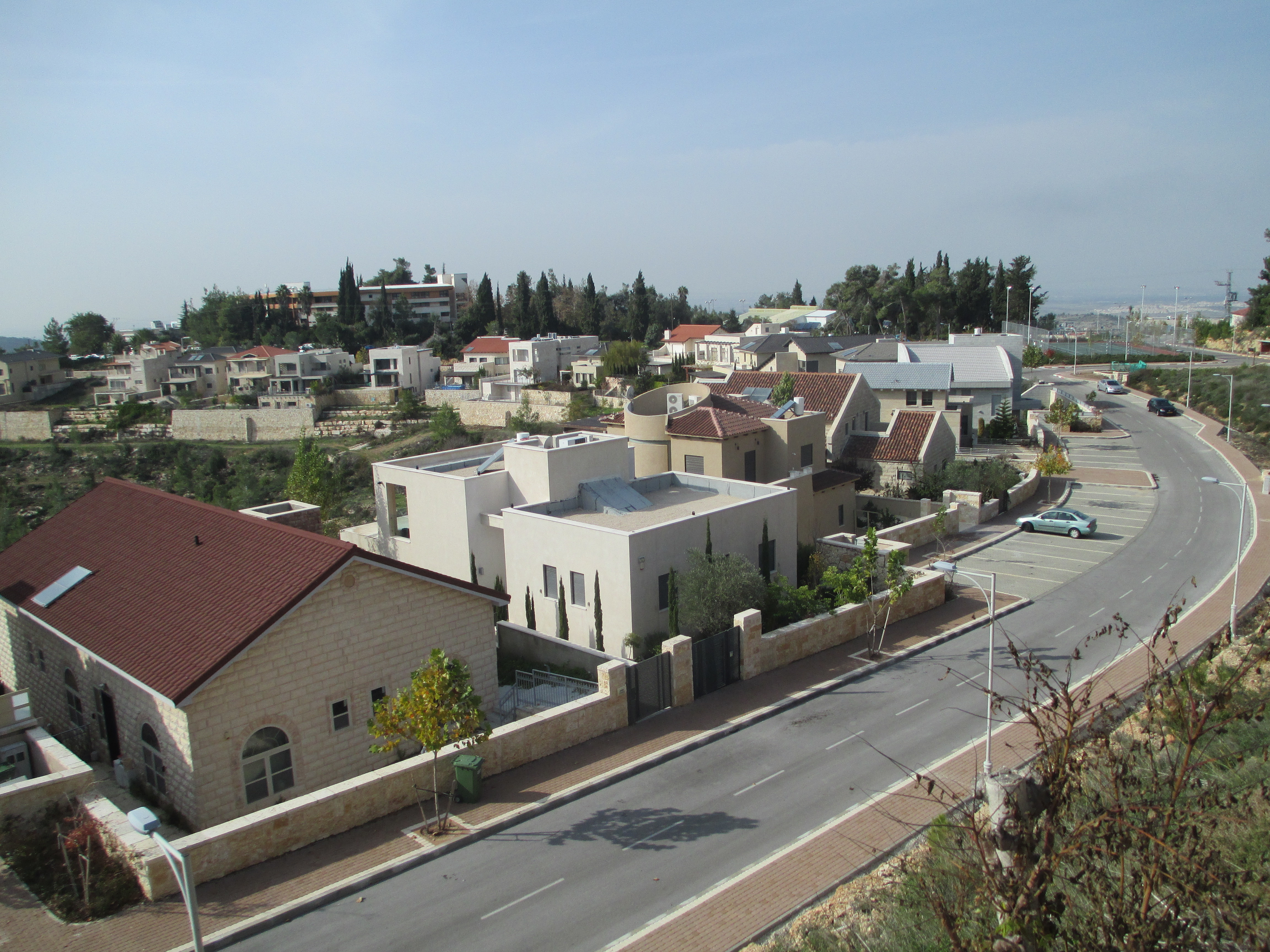

- Location within Jerusalem District
- Coordinates: 31°48′30″N 35°4′45″E
- Country: Israel
- District: Jerusalem
- Council: Mateh Yehuda
- Affiliation: Kibbutz Movement
- Founded: October 1946 (kibbutz); 1971 (moshav)
- Population (2024): 1,052

Neve Ilan (Hebrew: נְוֵה אִילָן, lit. Oasis of Ilan) is a moshav shitufi in central Israel. Located west of Jerusalem, it falls under the jurisdiction of Mateh Yehuda Regional Council. In 2024 it had a population of 1,052.

== Gallery ==
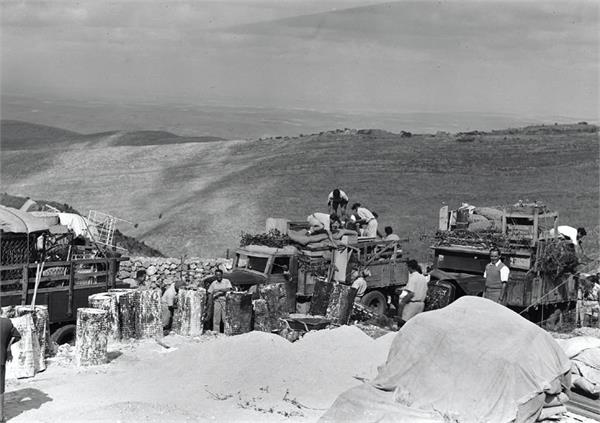
First settlers 27 October 1946

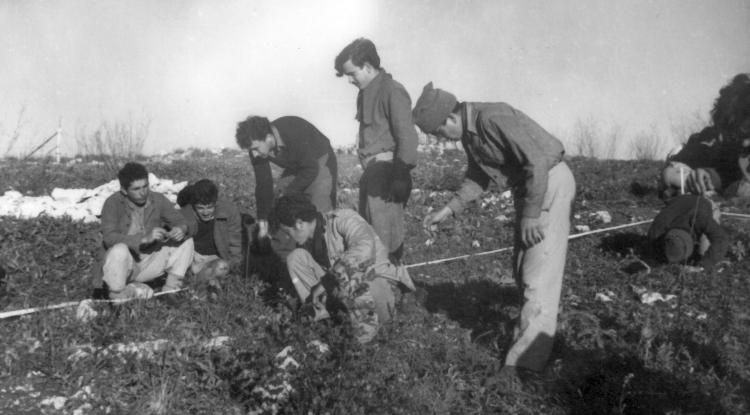
Palmach land mine trading in Neve Ilan, 1947

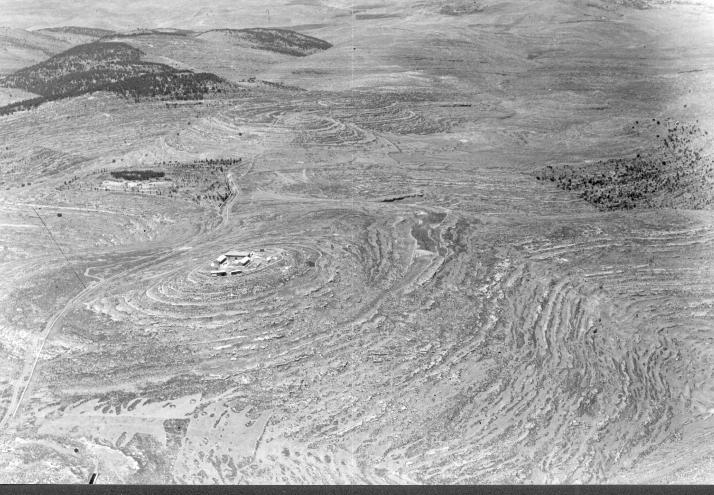
Neve Ilan 1948

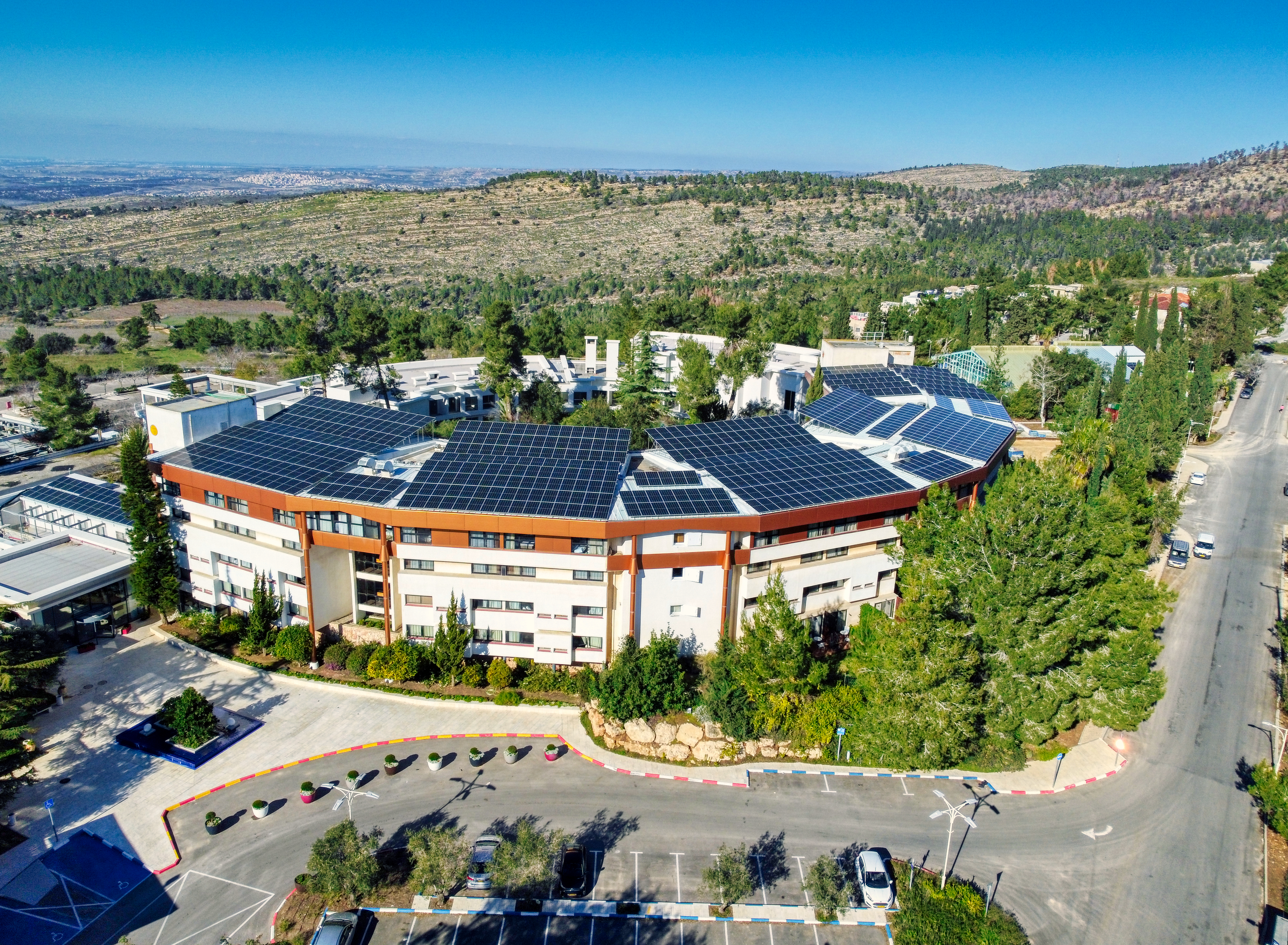
Neve Ilan Hotel, 2022

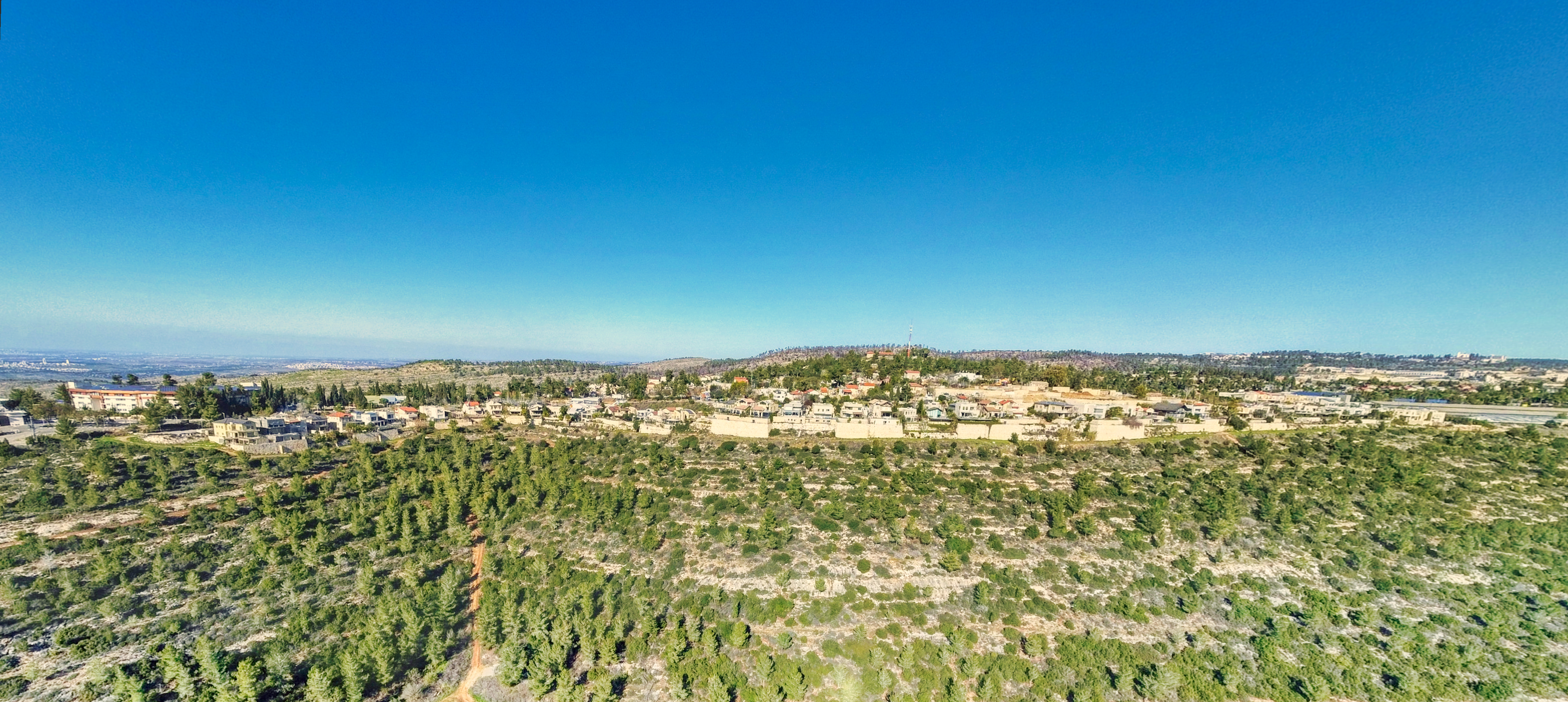
Neve Ilan, 2022
