= Ein Kerem Agricultural School =

Ein Kerem Agricultural School: בית ספר אזורי עין כרם (Hebrew)
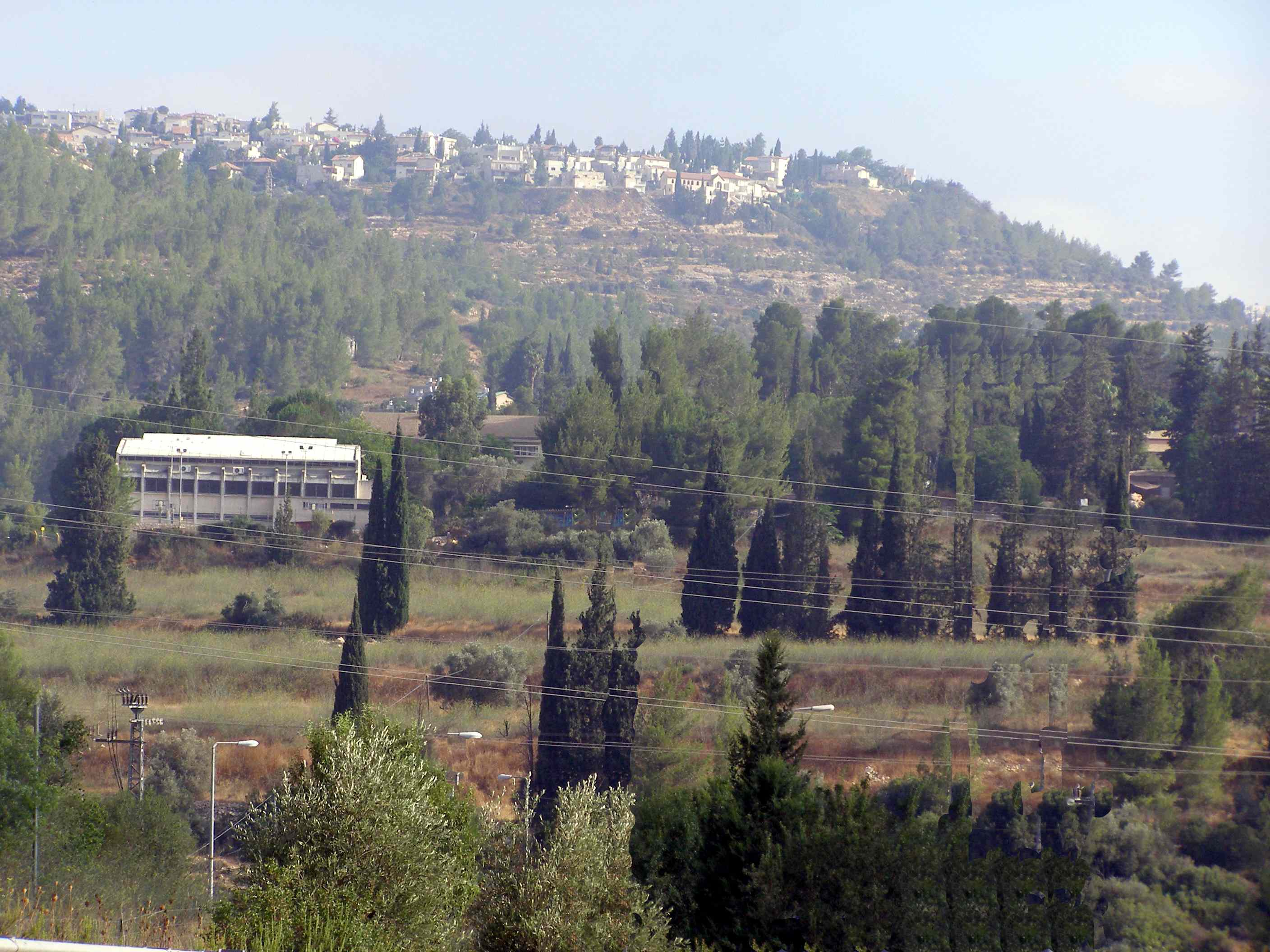

- Location within Jerusalem District
- Coordinates: 31°46′41″N 35°9′13″E
- Country: Israel
- District: Jerusalem
- Council: Mateh Yehuda
- Region: Jerusalem corridor
- Founded: 1948
- Website: www.einkarem.org.il

Ein Kerem Agricultural School (Hebrew: בית הספר החקלאי עין כרם, Beit HaSefer HaHakla'i Ein Kerem), also known as Ein Kerem Community Environmental School (Hebrew: בית הספר הקהילתי סביבתי עין כרם, Beit HaSefer HaKehilati Svivati Ein Kerem) is a school in central Israel. Located near Ein Kerem, it falls under the jurisdiction of Mateh Yehuda Regional Council.

== History ==
Ein Kerem school opened in 1948, after a farm school established in 1933 in East Talpiot by Rachel Yanait Ben-Zvi (later wife of President Yitzhak Ben-Zvi) moved to abandoned buildings in Ein Kerem that belonged to Palestinians after they fled during the events of the Nakba of 1948.

Aharon Appelfeld, who went on to become of one of Israel's leading authors, attended the Ein Kerem Agricultural School. He writes about the school in his memoirs:

In 1946–1948 I was in Youth Aliyah and in 1948–1950 I attended the agricultural school that Rachel Yanait had set up in ‘Ein Karem, as well as Hannah Meisel's agricultural school in Nahalal. For four straight years I was in contact with the soil and I was sure that fate intended me to be a worker of the soil. I loved the soil and, especially, the trees that I tended. My daily routine was clear during those years: reveille before dawn, arduous labor from 6:00 to 8:00, a full and aromatic breakfast, and uninterrupted work after that. I loved the afternoon naps that I took on hot summer days. In fact, part of my being was somnolent in those years. The war years dropped through me like a stone and I went and communed with the soil, the Hebrew language, and the books that I read with immense thirst.”

Today, Ein Kerem Agricultural School is a regional high school for localities in the Matte Yehuda Regional Council area. It offers classes in horticulture, nutrition, treatment of potted plants, geology, environmental studies, theater, Arabic and biology in addition to the regular curriculum.

== See also ==
- Education in Israel
