= Ma'ale HaHamisha =

Kibbutz in central Israel

Ma'ale HaHamisha: מעלה החמישה (Hebrew)
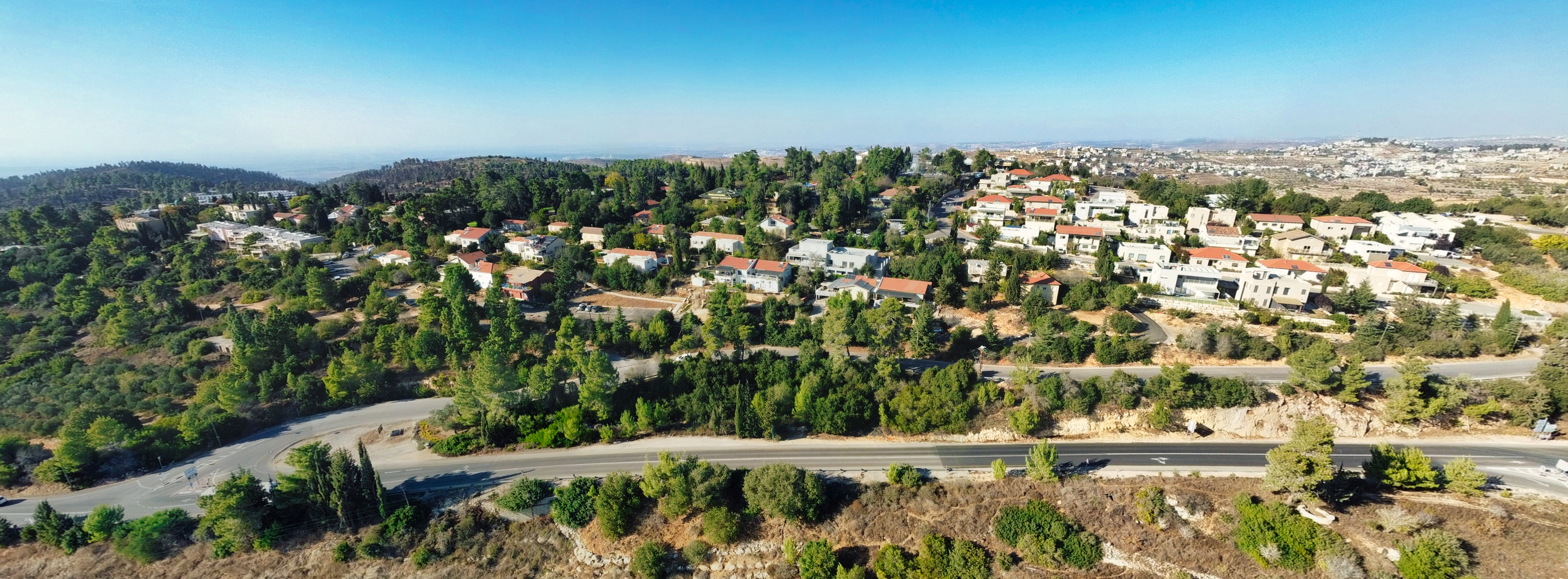
- Etymology: Ascent of the Five
- Location within Jerusalem District Location within Israel
- Coordinates: 31°49′2″N 35°6′39″E
- Country: Israel
- District: Jerusalem
- Council: Mateh Yehuda
- Affiliation: Kibbutz Movement
- Founded: 19 July 1938
- Founder: Gordonia members
- Population (2024): 901

Ma'ale HaHamisha (Hebrew: מעלה החמישה, lit. 'Ascent of the Five') is a kibbutz in central Israel. Located in the Judean hills just off the Jerusalem–Tel Aviv highway, It falls under the jurisdiction of Mateh Yehuda Regional Council. In 2024 it had a population of 901.

== History ==
The kibbutz was founded by members of the Gordonia youth movement on 19 July 1938 as one of 57 tower and stockade settlements founded almost overnight between 1936 and 1939 in order to establish a permanent Jewish presence in Palestine under the threat of attacks during the Arab revolt. It was named after five men ambushed and killed by Arab gunmen nearby. Ma'ale HaHamisha took in refugees from Gush Etzion in 1949.

== Economy ==
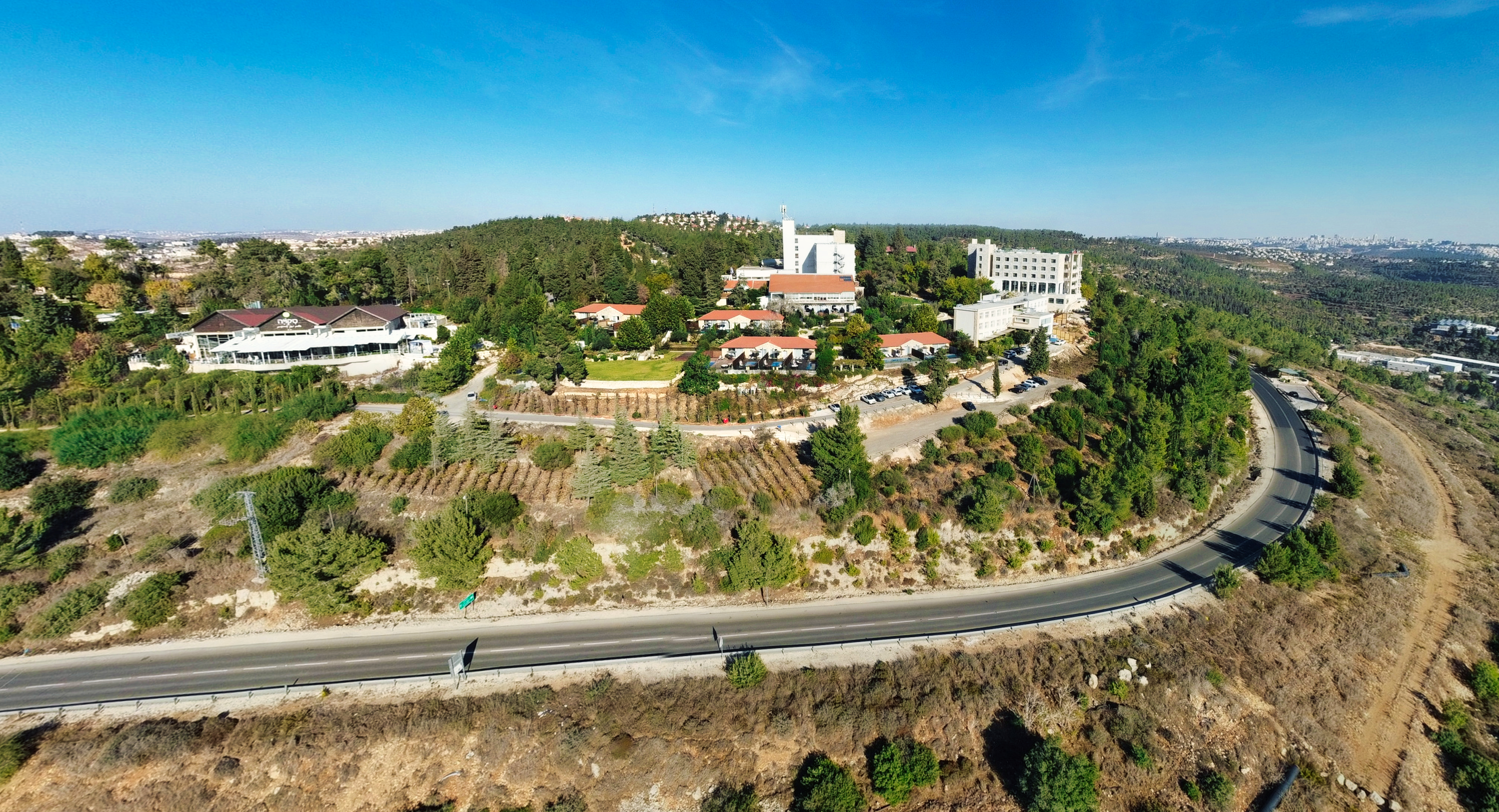
Tourism and events complex

The kibbutz originally supported itself primarily on agriculture and developed both the Ma'ale HaHamisha cauliflower and peach, as well as gaining income from a hotel. In the early 2000s, the main issue in privatization of the kibbutz was what type of financial and social change could take place. Until then, all sources of income, including German reparations and old age payments, went into the kibbutz kitty, which supplied all necessities, communal and individual. The concept of sliding pay scales for different work — promoted primarily by the younger generation — had to be reconciled with the contributions of the veteran members.

The kibbutz struggled over the fate of community property. Members' apartments might be individually owned, but over the years, as the older generation remained in smaller units, bigger apartments were built for the younger generation and for a new familial sleeping scheme that had abandoned separate children’s houses. Members also had to decide what to do with the hotel and conference center. It took intervention by an outside arbitrator to reconcile the differences. In January 2005 the kibbutz was privatized.

Today the kibbutz economy is based on the Ma'ale HaHamisha Hotel and Sakoya events hall.

== Notable people ==
- Avigdor Arikha

== Gallery ==
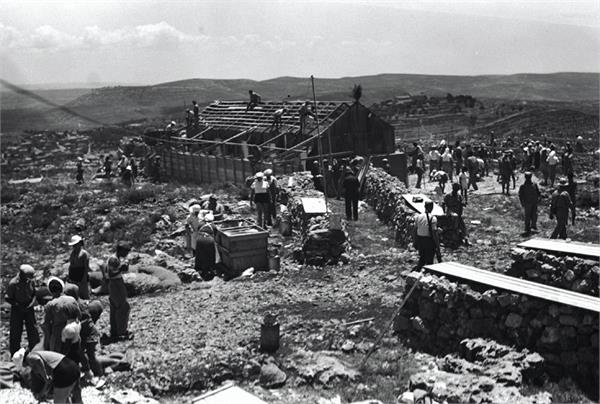
Ma'ale HaHamisha July 1938

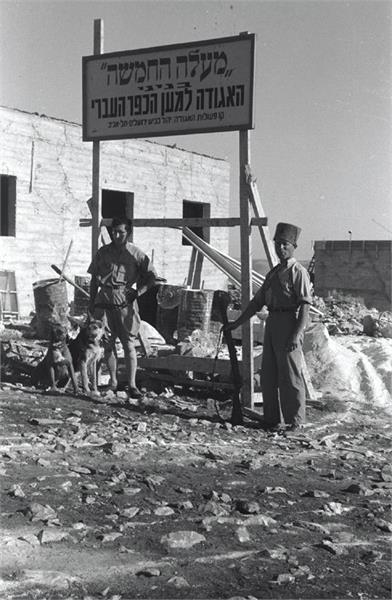
Ma'ale HaHamisha November 1938

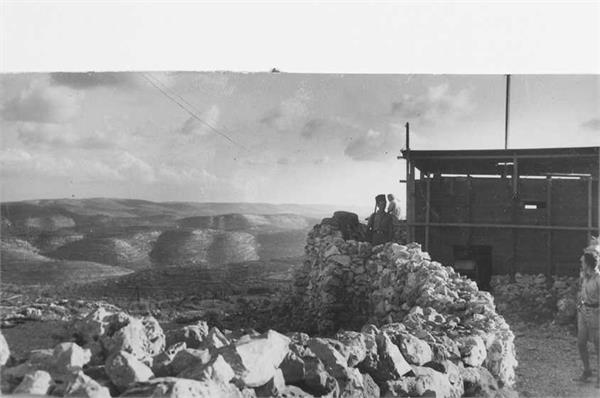
Ma’ale HaHamisha 1938

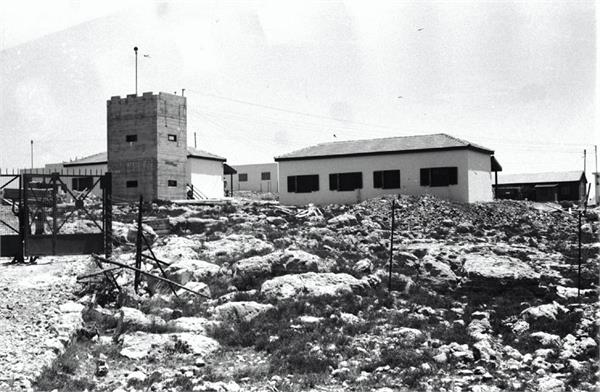
Ma'ale HaHamisha July 1939

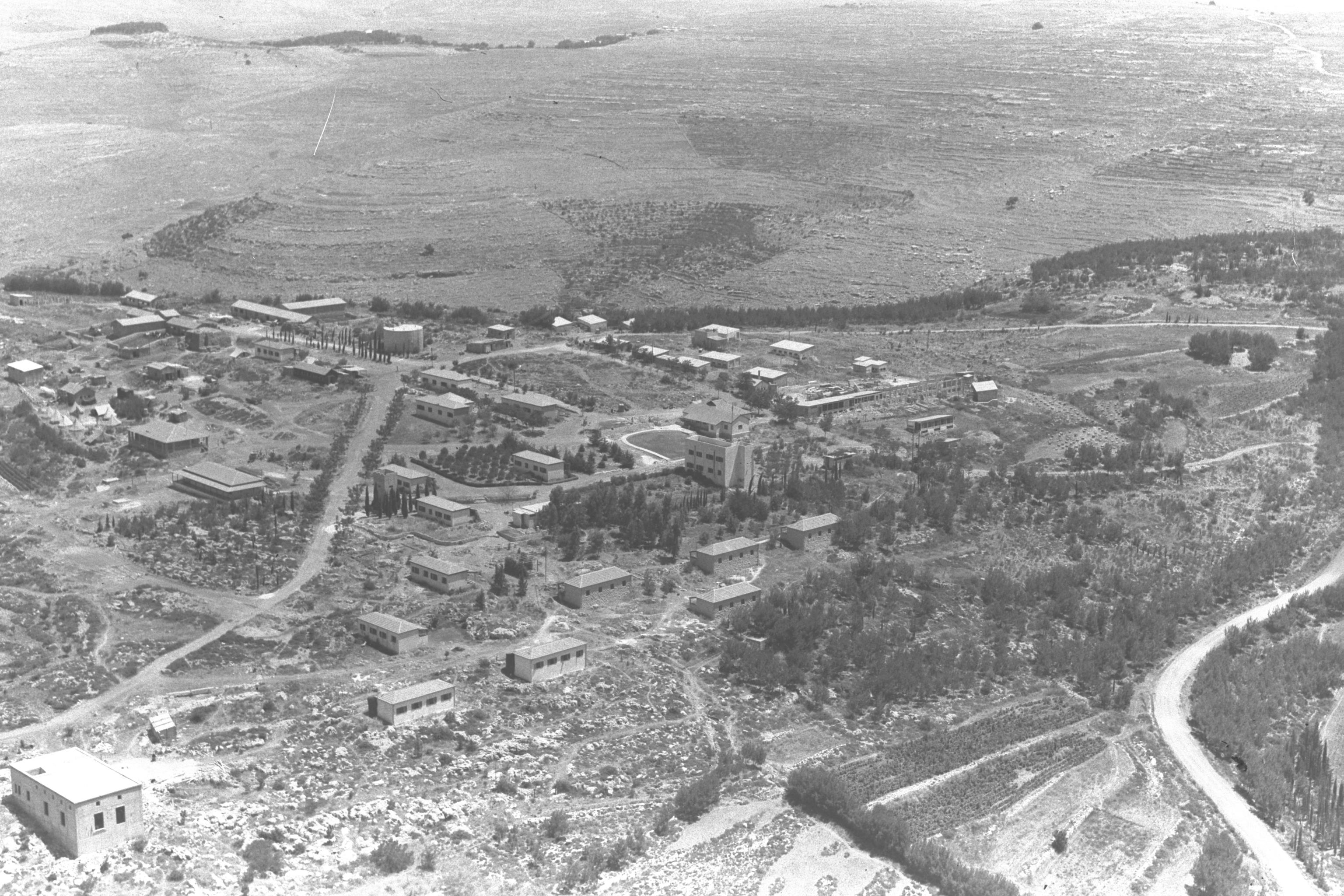
Ma'ale HaHamisha 1945

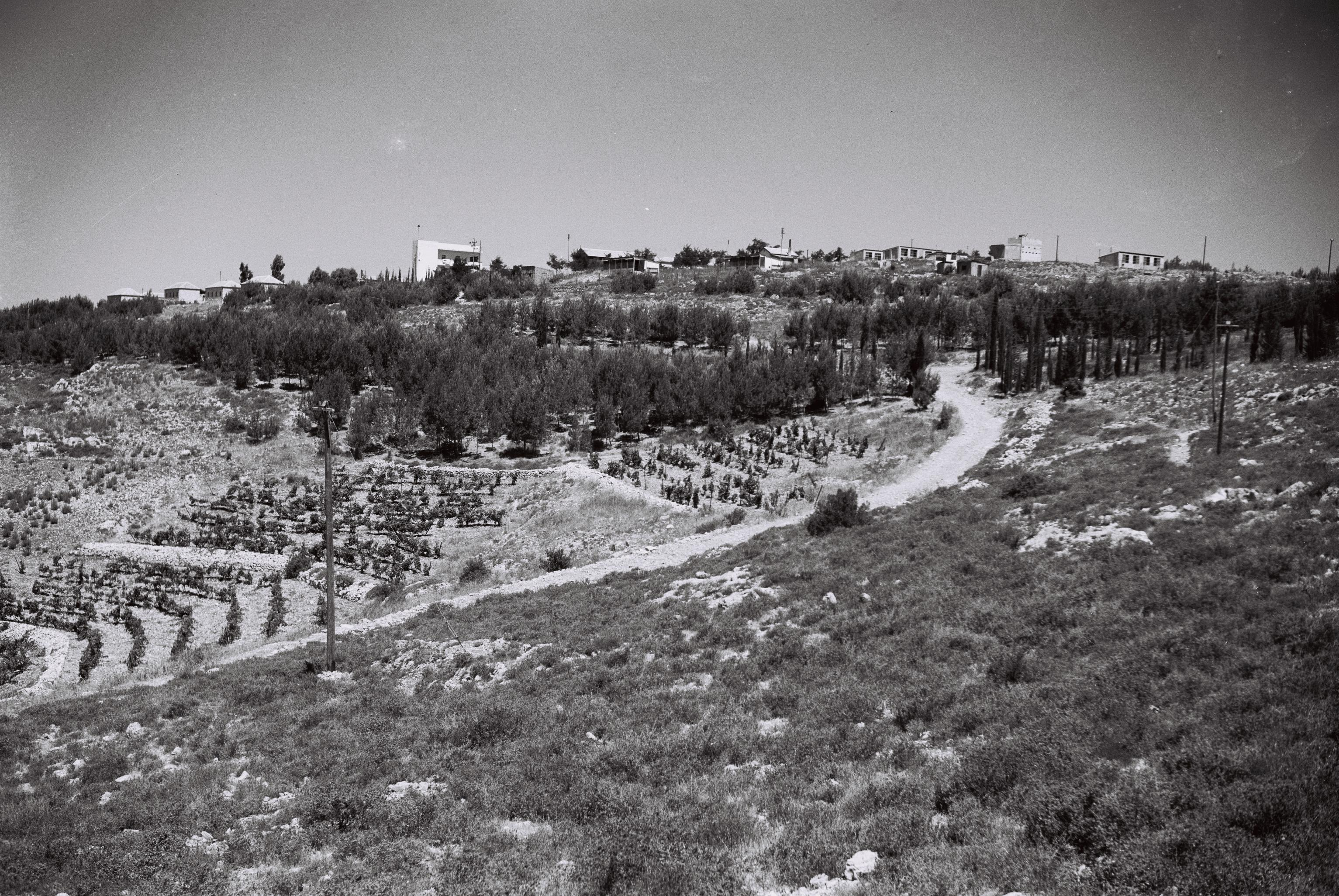
Ma'ale HaHamisha 1945

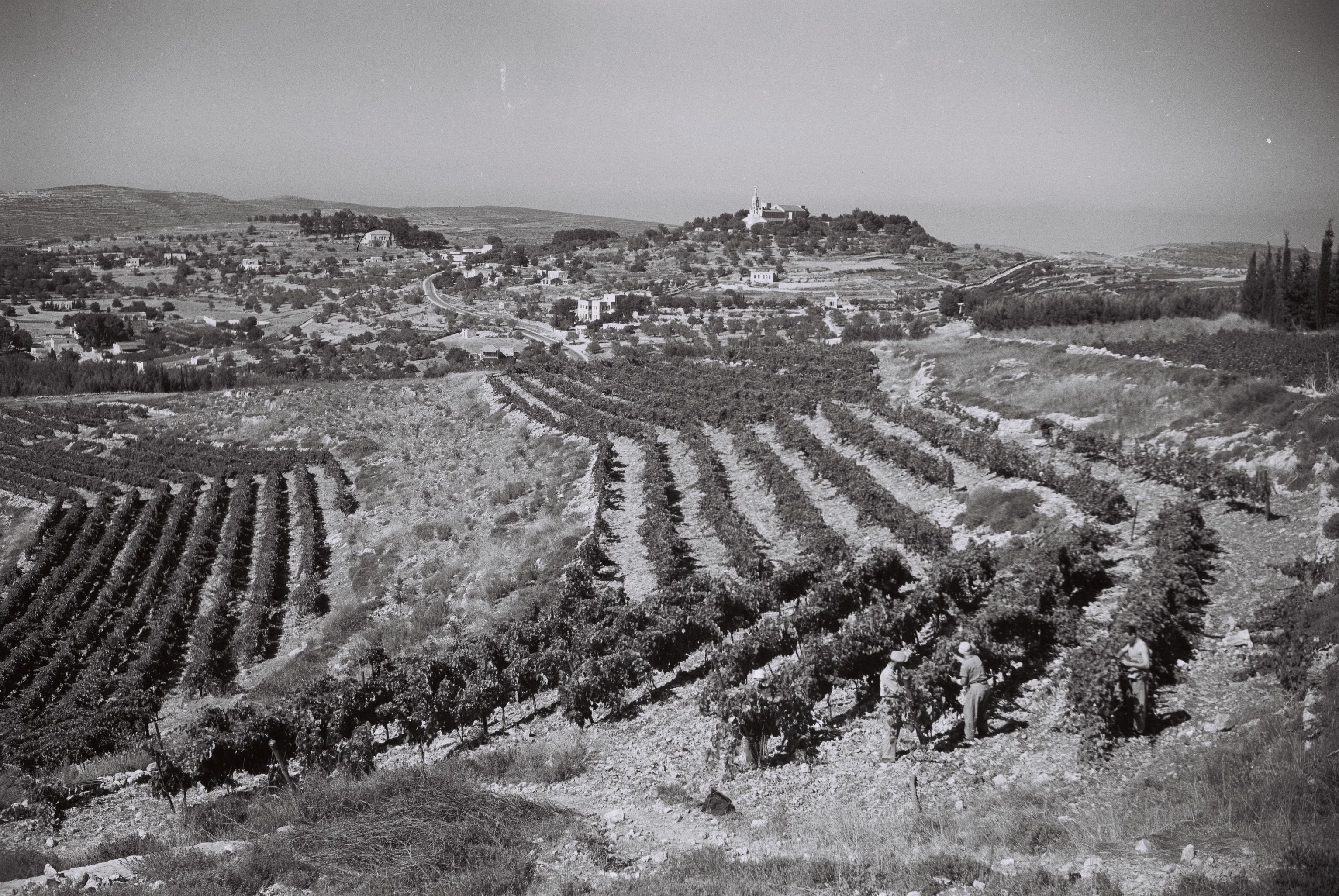
Ma'ale HaHamisha 1945

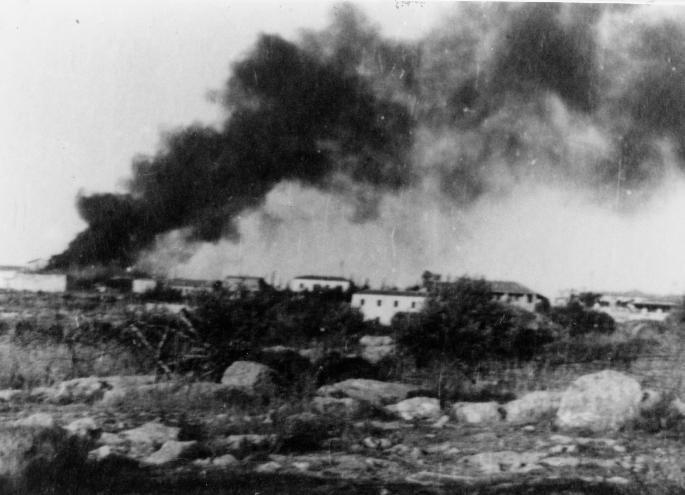
Food warehouse at Ma'ale HaHamisha on fire following shelling from Radar Hill, 1948

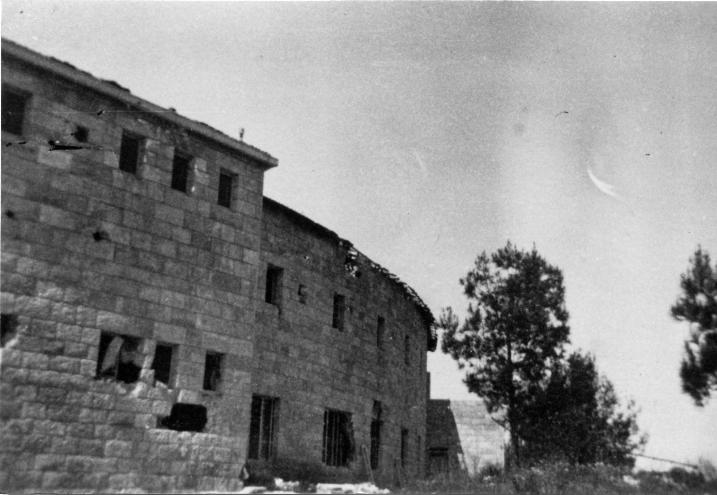
Peperman building, Ma'ale HaHamisha, after battle with Arab Legion

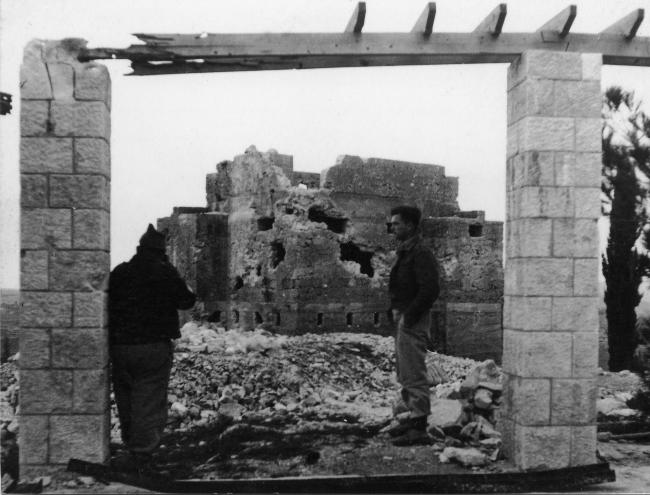
1948 damage to the Peperman sanatorium
