= Jerusalem District =

District of Israel

- District of Israel

transcription(s)
  - Hebrew: מחוז ירושלים
  - Arabic: منطقة القدس
- Interactive map of Jerusalem District
- Coordinates: 31°45′N 35°00′E
- Cities: 2
- Local councils: 4
- Regional council: 1
- Capital: Jerusalem

Government
  - District Commissioner: Haim Yifrach

Area
  - Total: 652 km^{2} (252 sq mi)

Population (2024)
  - Total: 1,331,595
  - Density: 2,040/km^{2} (5,290/sq mi)
- ISO 3166 code: IL-JM

The Jerusalem District (Hebrew: מחוז ירושלים; Arabic: منطقة القدس) is one of the six administrative districts of Israel. The district capital is Jerusalem and its total land area is 652 km^{2}. The population of 1,331,595 is 64.4% Jewish and 31.2% Arab. A fifth (21%) of the Arabs in Israel live in the Jerusalem Municipality, which includes both East and West Jerusalem. Israel's annexation of East Jerusalem has not been recognized by the international community.

Most Arabs in the Jerusalem District are Palestinians, eligible to apply for citizenship under Israeli law, but either decline to apply or are unsuccessful in doing so. Arab citizens of Israel constitute a significant minority in the district, living in Abu Ghosh, Beit Safafa and East Jerusalem, where Arab professionals have settled since the late 1970s, mainly for the provision of legal and other services to the local population. The non-Jewish population is 95.2% Muslim, 3.5% Christian with the others unclassified by religion.

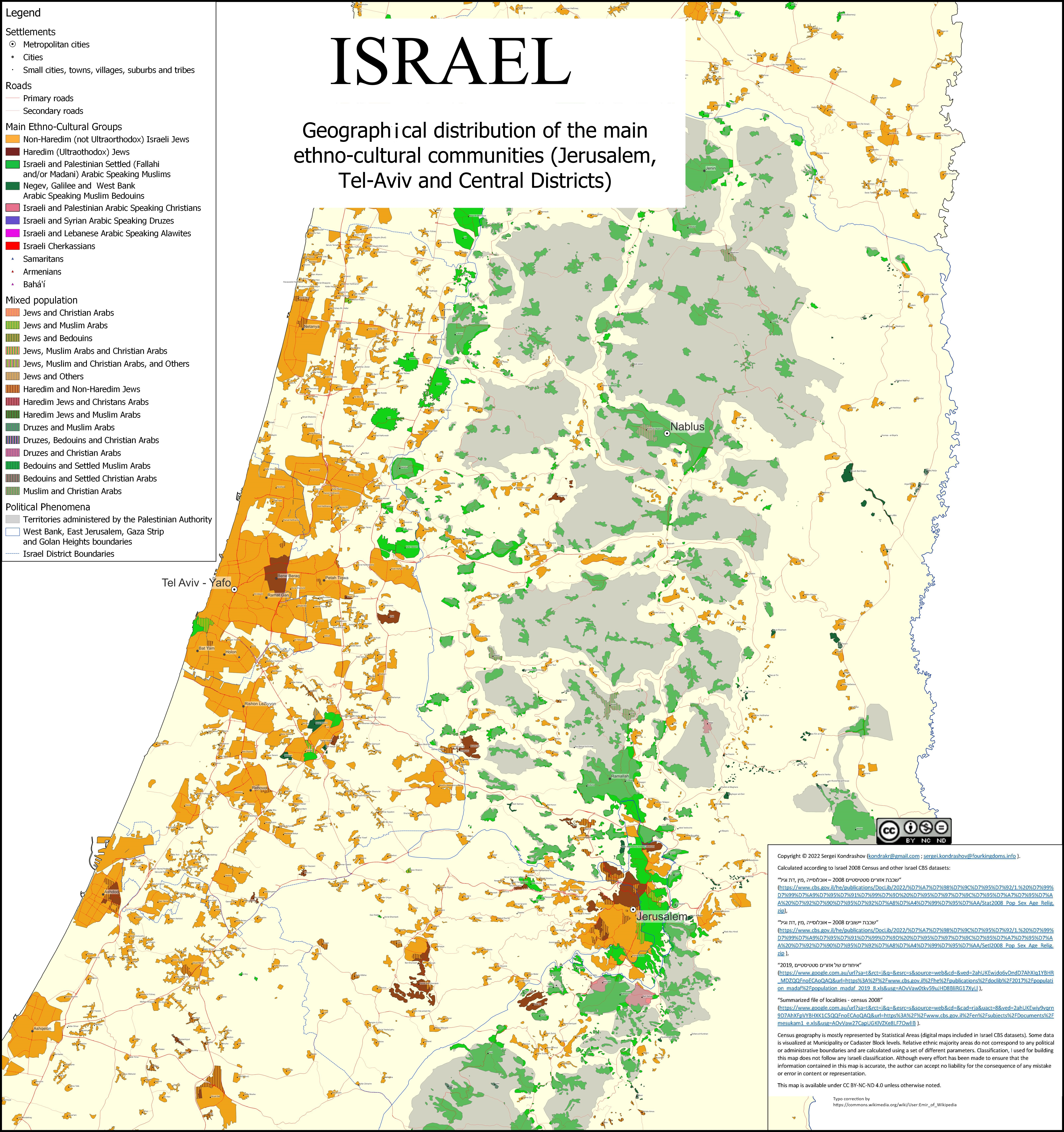
Geographical distribution of the main ethno-cultural communities, Jerusalem, Tel-Aviv and Central districts.

== Demographics ==
Historical population
Year	Pop.	±%
1972	349,500	—
1983	469,800	+34.4%
1995	688,900	+46.6%
2008	904,370	+31.3%
2022	1,252,880	+38.5%
2024	1,331,595	+6.3%

== Administrative local authorities ==
Natural Regions
Judean Foothills; Judean Mountains
Cities	Local councils	Regional council
Beit Shemesh (Note: A part of the Judean Foothills Natural Region.); Jerusalem (Note: A part of the Judean Mountains Natural Region.)	Abu Ghosh; Kiryat Ye'arim; Mevaseret Zion; Tzur Hadassah	Mateh Yehuda

Notes

The Jerusalem Municipality, including East Jerusalem and other annexed parts of the West Bank, constituted 125 km^{2} (48 sq mi), about 19% of the Jerusalem District in 2008.

== See also ==
- Arab localities in Israel
- Jerusalem Governorate
- Judaean Mountains
- List of cities in Israel
- Status of Jerusalem
- Timeline of Jerusalem
- Valley of Elah
