= Yish'i =

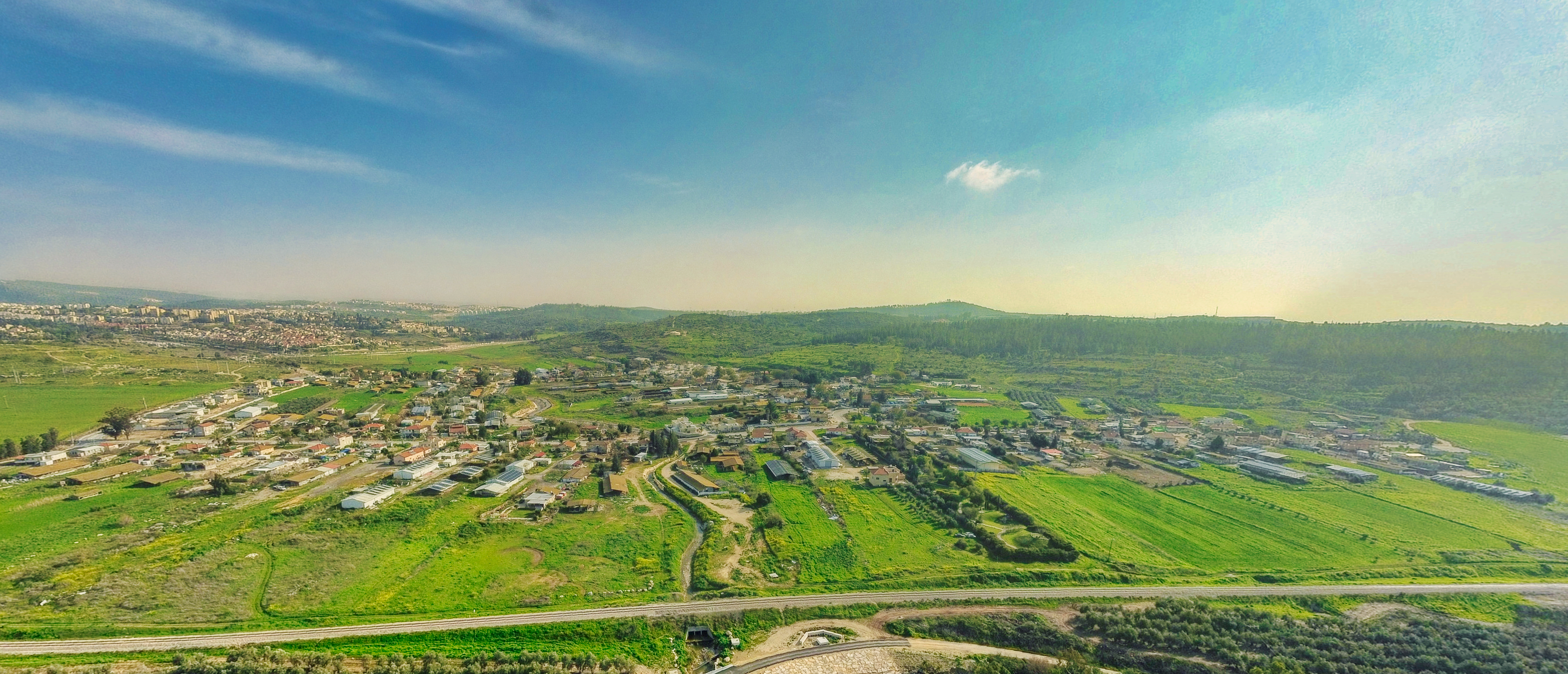

- Location within Jerusalem District
- Coordinates: 31°45′3″N 34°58′0″E
- Country: Israel
- District: Jerusalem
- Council: Mateh Yehuda
- Affiliation: Hapoel HaMizrachi
- Founded: 12 July 1950
- Founder: Yemenite Jews
- Population (2024): 938

Yish'i (Hebrew: יִשְׁעִי, lit. 'My Salvation') is a moshav in central Israel. Located near Beit Shemesh, it falls under the jurisdiction of Mateh Yehuda Regional Council. In 2024 it had a population of 938.

== Etymology ==
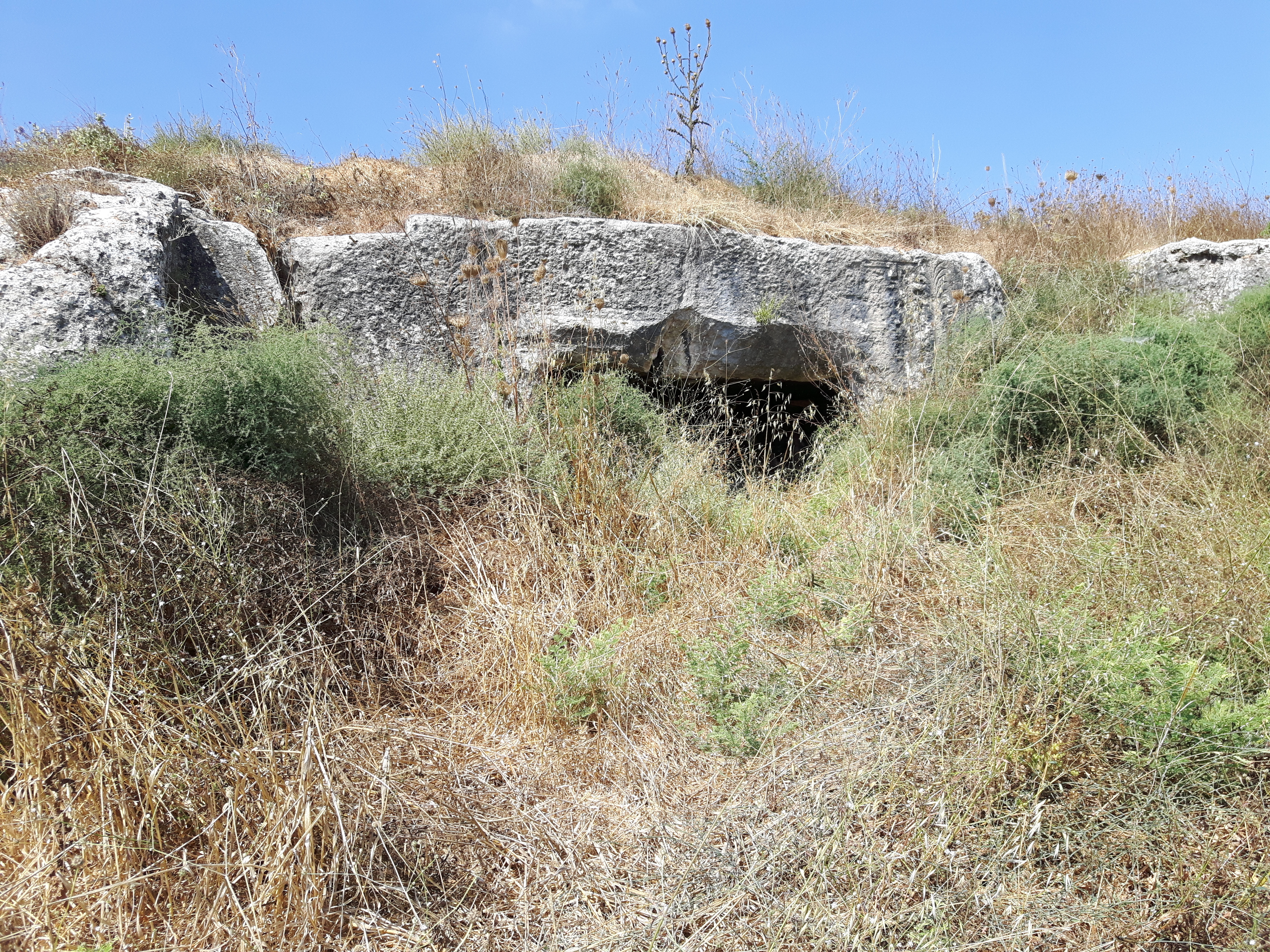
Elaborated Jewish tomb in Moshav Yish'i

The village's name it taken from Psalms 27:1;

The LORD is my light and my salvation; whom shall I fear? The LORD is the stronghold of my life; of whom shall I be afraid?

== History ==
The village was established on 12 July 1950 by immigrants from Yemen.

In ancient times, the Judahite town of Engannim, today the archaeological site of Horbat Gannim, was located immediately to the south. The moshav was built on the pre-1948 village lands of the depopulated Palestinian village of Dayr Aban.

The moshav specializes in modern and organic agriculture. In the past, the residents' economy was based on many avocado plantations, broiler farming and field crops, but today the vast majority of farms do not make a living from agriculture. Many residents rent housing units in the settlement. Most of the residents currently make a living from foreign jobs. The moshav has several private swimming pools, active living areas, and several businesses.

Above the moshav, in the area intended for expansion, is the archaeological site "Kherbat Am-Jena", which is identified with the biblical city of Ein Ganim in the Judean Lowlands. Also, nearby is the ancient site Be'er Limon that is dated to the Roman period and where there is a water source enclosed by an ancient stone building.

== Nature ==
Nahal Yishai crosses the moshav running under two bridges. Water flow continues even in the summer, with laboratory tests determining the source as groundwater.

As winter arrives the stream becomes a natural habitat for frogs to breed in, as well as African softshell turtles, which were also observed there. Following the frogs and the earthworm, come flocks of cuckoos and herons, which nest there every autumn. In the inner complex between the two main roads, a wild area and orchards. In this area there is a large herd of jackals, which is under the control of the Israel Nature and Parks Authority. Mongooses, foxes and, more rarely, hyenas have been observed in the moshav. There is a permanent population of barn-owls, falcons, as well as hawks.

Storks are known to stop and rest on the roof tops in the moshav as they migrate from Europe to Africa and back. In the olive vineyard in the center of the moshav there is a massive nest of finches. Many plant species were recorded in the Yish'i area, among them common iris, cyclamen, Rover bellflower, and the growth of the autumn mandrake mentioned in the book of Genesis was also recorded.

== Gallery ==
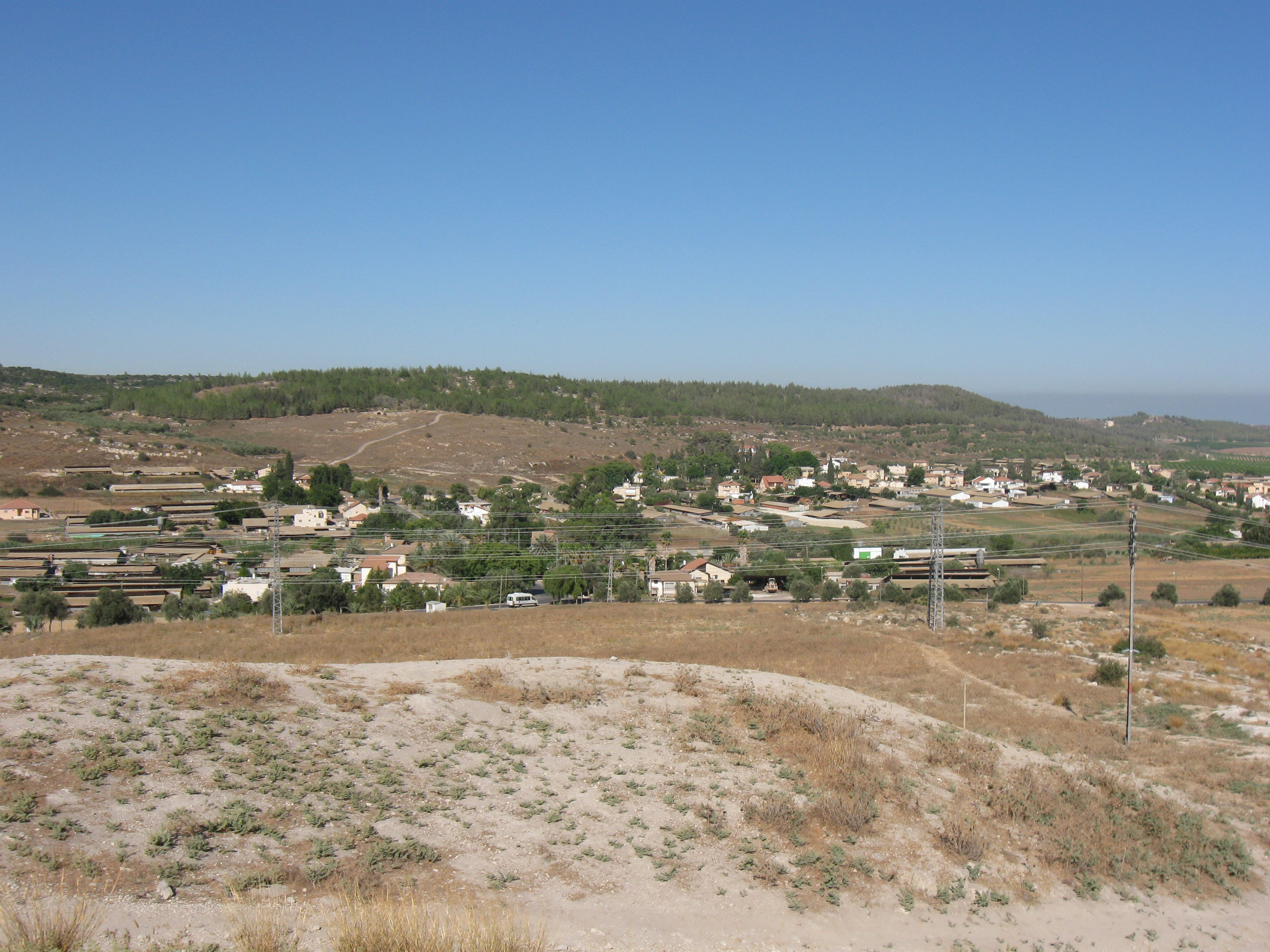
A view of Yish'i

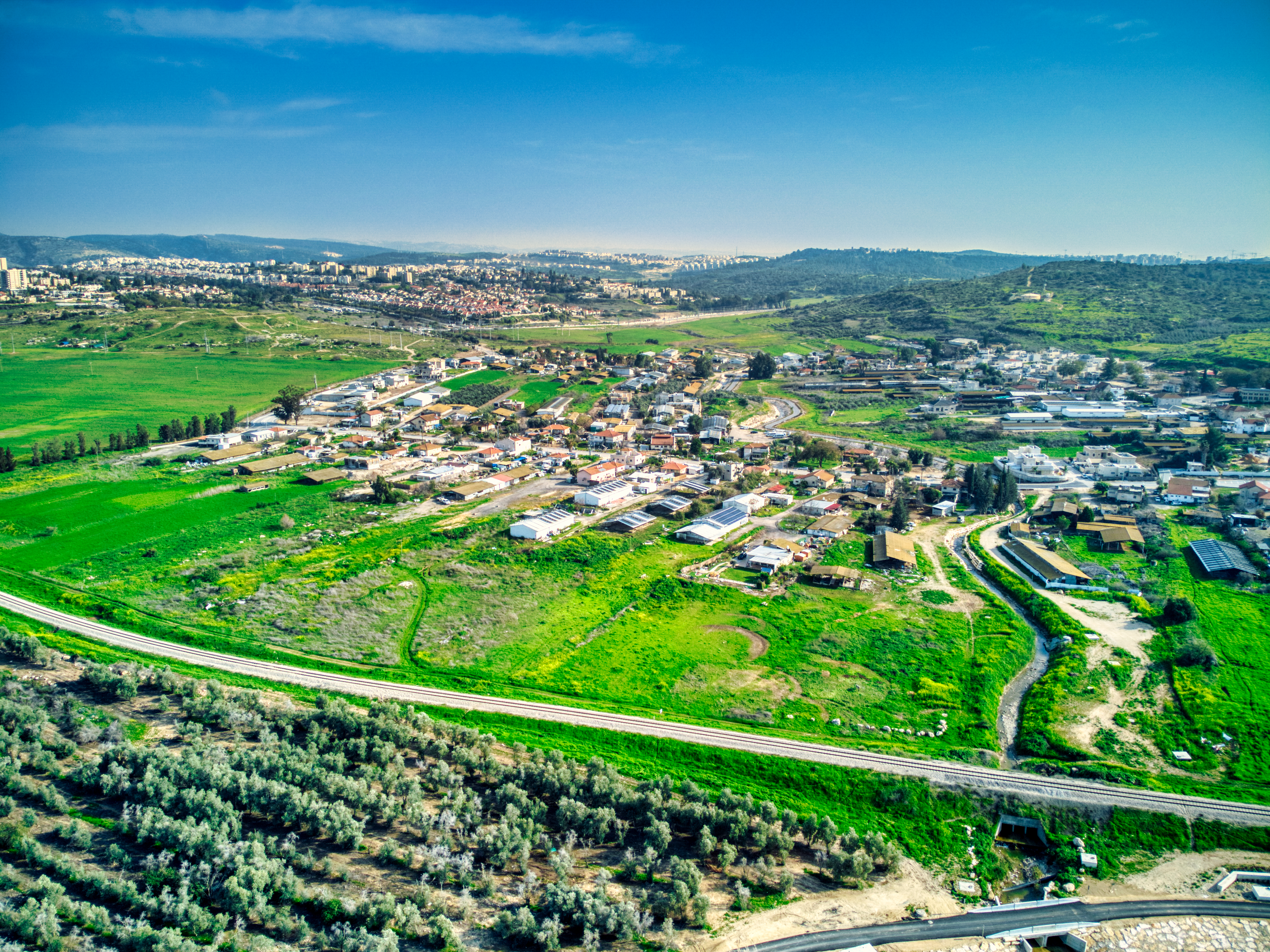
Yish'i - East of Yish'i riverbed

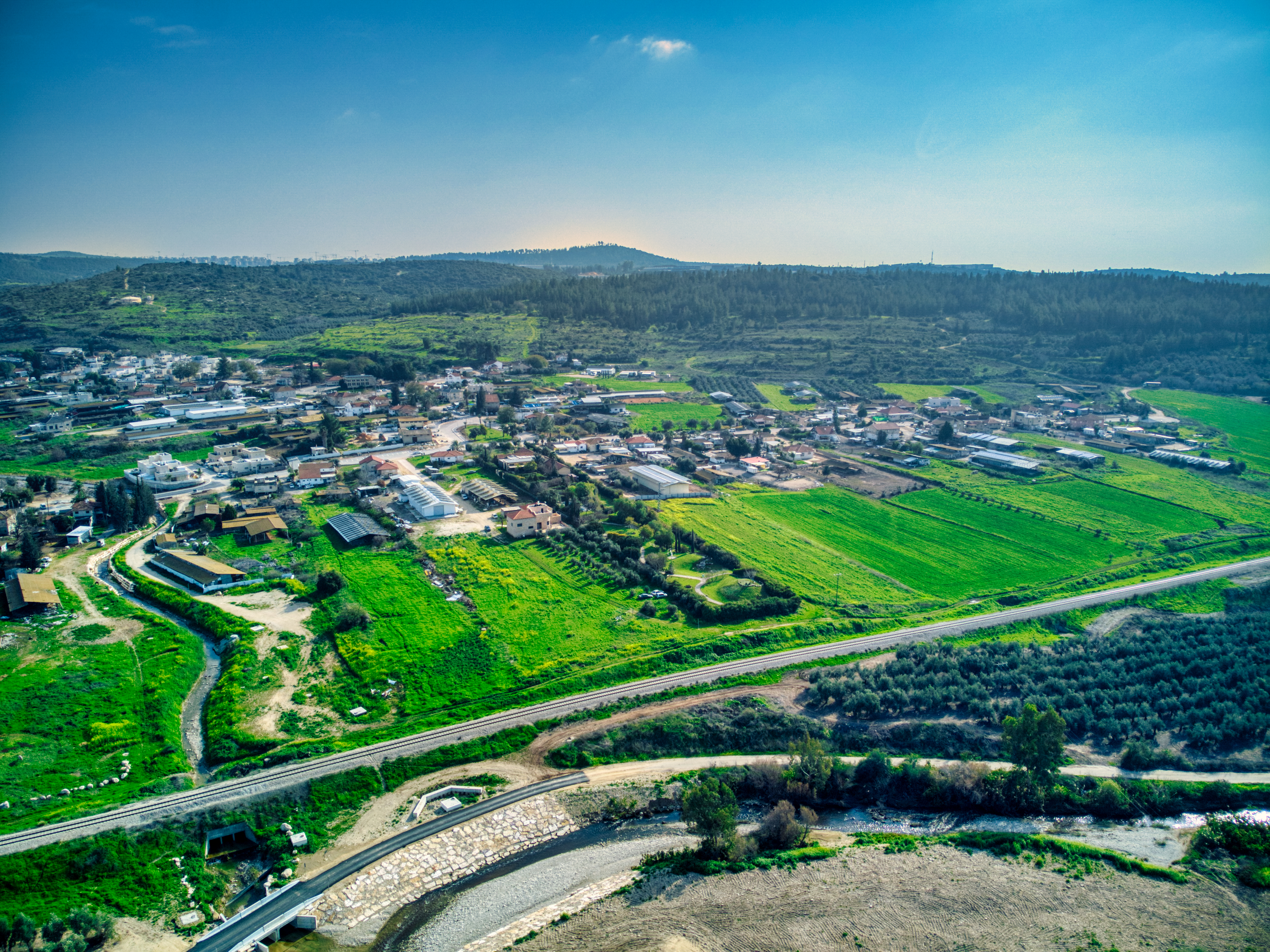
Yish'i - West of Yish'i riverbed

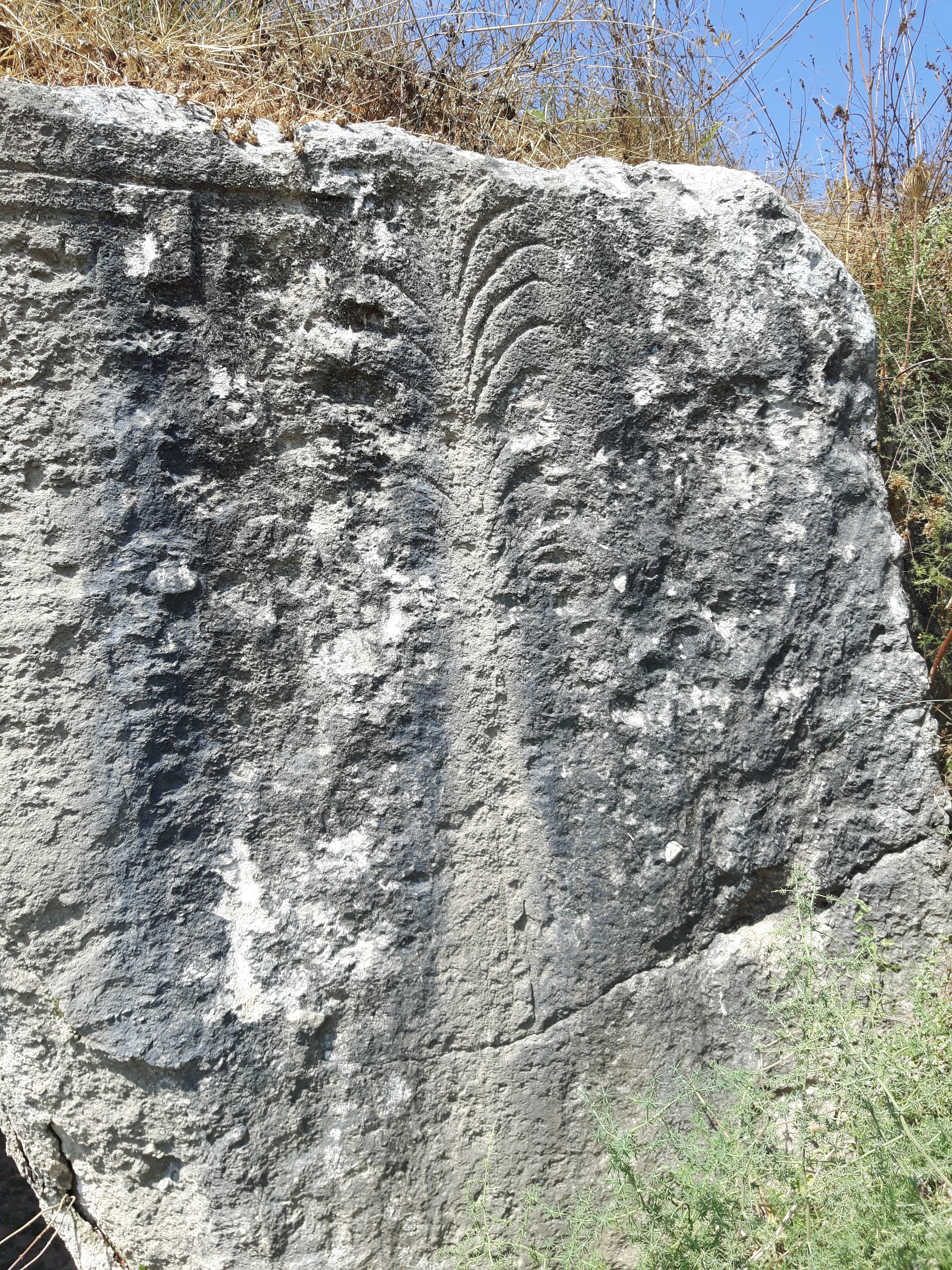
Decoration on the right top corner of a Jewish grave
