= Dayr Aban =

Dayr Aban دير آبان
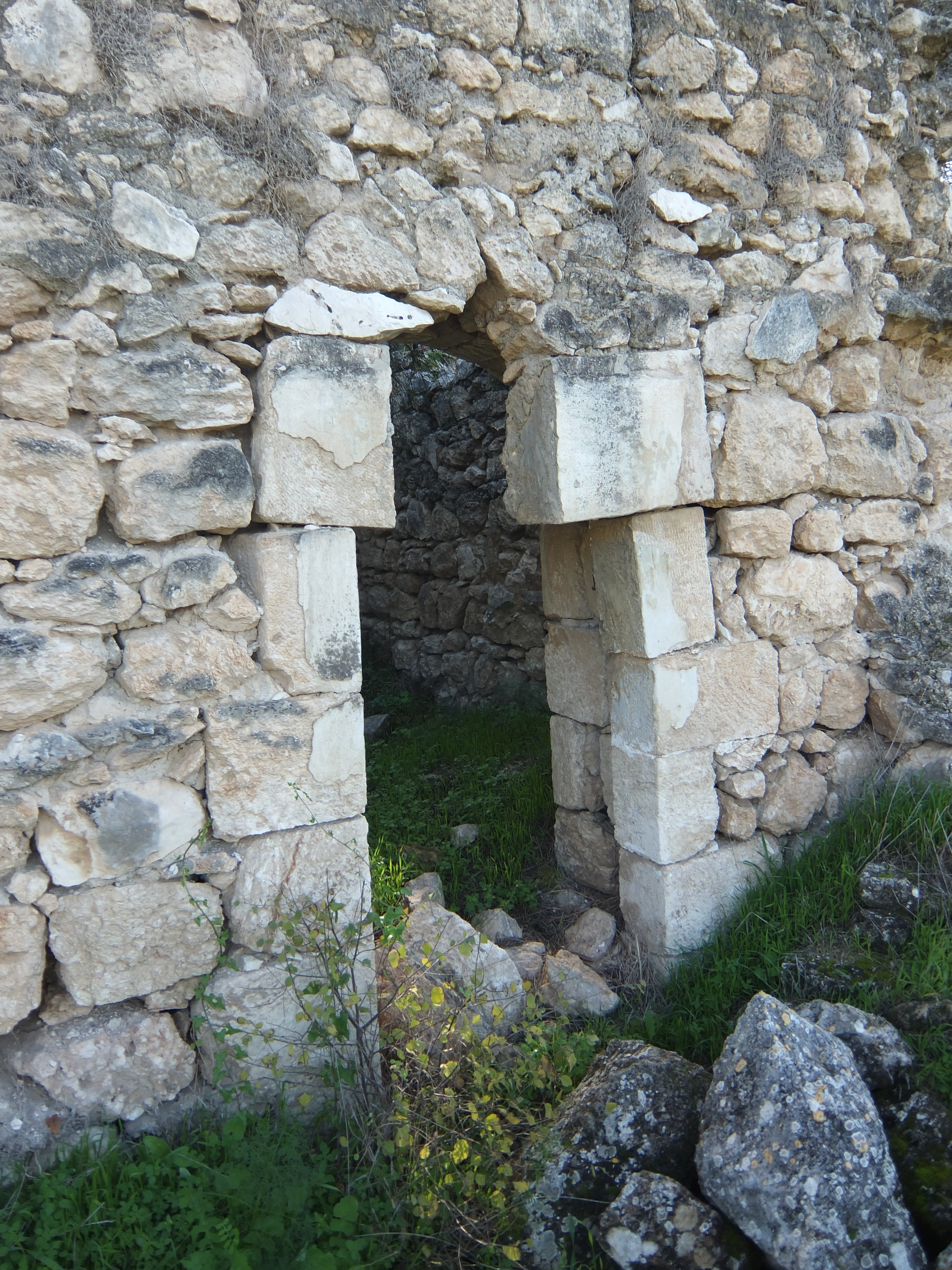
- Entrance to a house in Dayr Aban
- Etymology: The Monastery of Aban
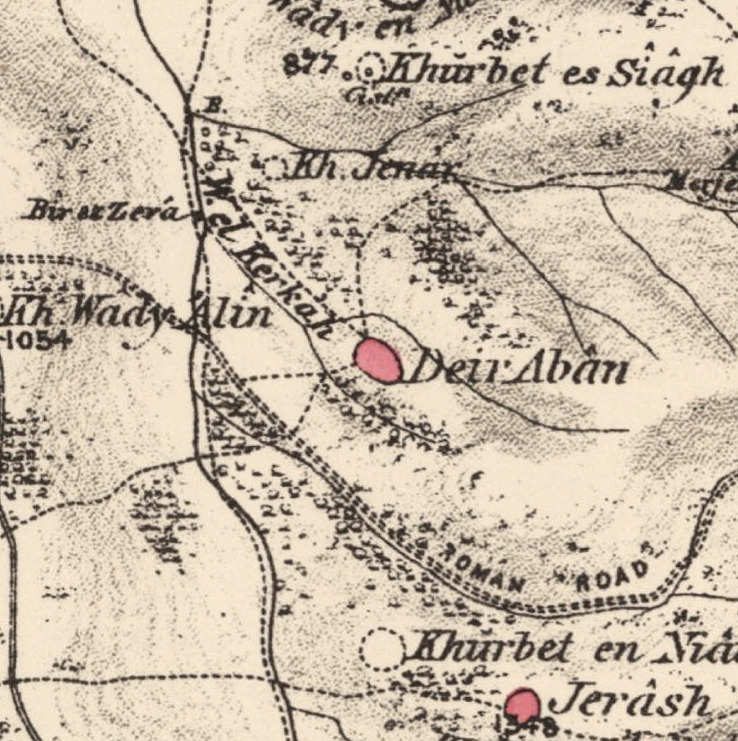
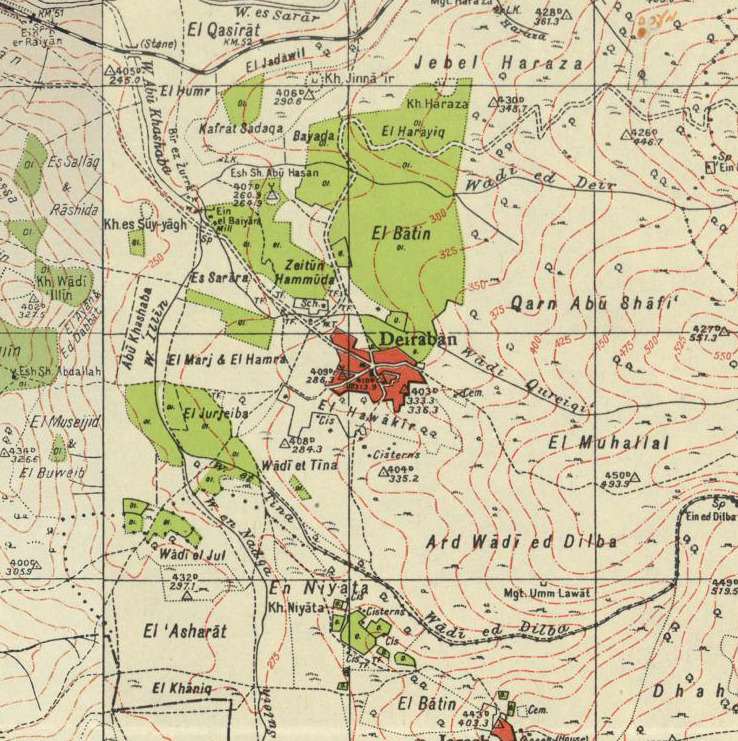
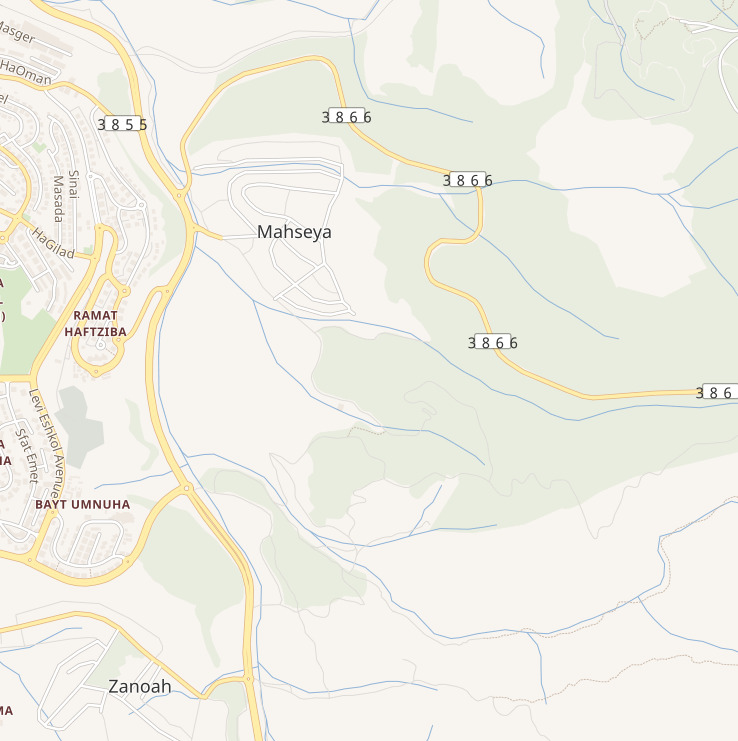
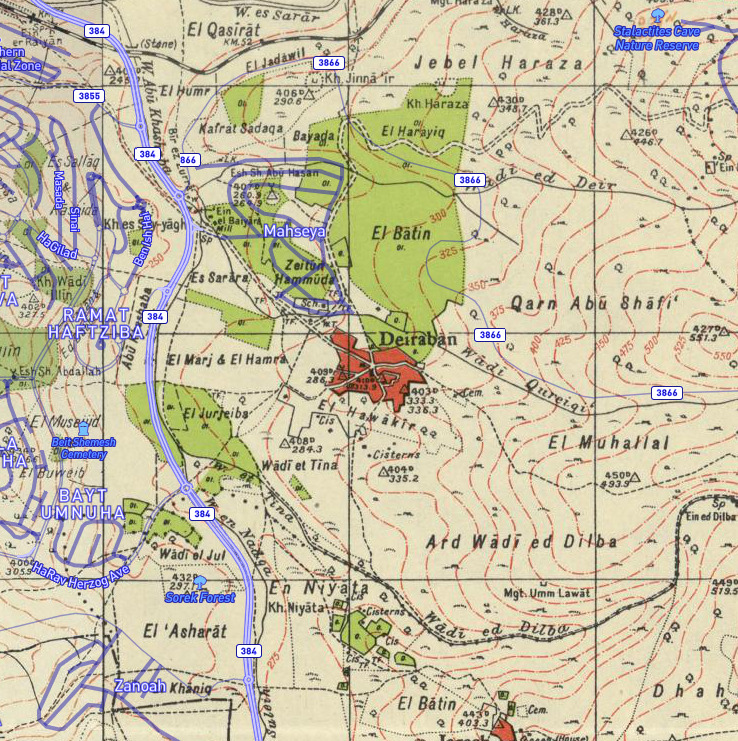
- 1870s map 1940s map modern map 1940s with modern overlay map A series of historical maps of the area around Dayr Aban (click the buttons)

- Location within Mandatory Palestine
- Coordinates: 31°44′33″N 35°00′34″E
- Palestine grid: 151/127
- Geopolitical entity: Mandatory Palestine
- Subdistrict: Jerusalem
- Date of depopulation: October 19–20, 1948

Area
  - Total: 22,734 dunams (22.734 km^{2}; 8.778 sq mi)

Population (1945)
  - Total: 2,100
- Cause(s) of depopulation: Military assault by Yishuv forces
- Current Localities: Tzora, Mahseya, Beit Shemesh, and Yish'i

Dayr Aban (also spelled Deir Aban; Arabic: دير آبان) was a Palestinian Arab village in the Jerusalem Subdistrict, located on the lower slope of a high ridge that formed the western slope of a mountain, to the east of Beit Shemesh. It was formerly bordered by olive trees to the north, east, and west. The valley, Wadi en-Najil, ran north and south on the west-side of the village.

The village is associated with the biblical site of Eben-Ezer. The prefix "Dayr" hints at a historical monastery. Early Ottoman records document a mixed Christian and Muslim population. However, by the 17th century, historical records highlights a communal conversion to Islam. Nonetheless, traditions linked to the village's Christian past persisted in later periods.

Dayr Aban was depopulated during the 1948 Arab-Israeli War on October 19, 1948, during Operation Ha-Har. It was located 21 km west of Jerusalem. Today there are over 5000 people originally from Deir Aban living in Jordan.

== History ==
In pre-Roman and Roman times the settlement was referred to as "Abenezer", and may have been the location of the biblical site Eben-Ezer.(1 Samuel 4:1–11).

The name Dayr indicates that this was the site of a Christian monastery.

=== Ottoman era ===
In 1596, Dayr Aban appeared in Ottoman tax registers as being in the Nahiya of Quds of the Liwa of Quds. It had a population of 23 Muslim households and 23 Christian households; that is, an estimated 127 persons. They paid a fixed tax rate of 33,3% on agricultural products, such as wheat, barley, olives, and goats or beehives; a total of 9,700 Akçe.

In the 17th century, the inhabitants of Dayr Aban collectively converted to Islam, an unusual event within the Middle East during the Ottoman period. Jerusalem court records document four related conversion certificates. The earliest, dated 1635, records the conversion of a person named Gimʿa bin Dāfir. Subsequently, in 1649-1650, three additional certificates were issued. Two, from September 5, 1649, concern individuals named Rabīʿa and Nāṣir bin Manṣūr. Later, on March 7, 1650, a communal conversion of all Dayr Abān's residents was documented. The document lists both the original and new names of the converts, along with a note indicating the entire village's conversion.

In 1838, Deir Aban was noted as a Muslim village, located in the el-Arkub District, south west of Jerusalem.

Victor Guérin described it in 1863 as being a large village, and its adjacent valley "strewn with sesame." An Ottoman village list from about 1870 found that the village had a population of 443, in a total of 135 houses, though the population count included men, only.

In 1883, the PEF's Survey of Western Palestine described Dayr Aban as "a large village on the lower slope of a high ridge, with a well to the north, and olives on the east, west, and north. This place no doubt represents the fourth century site of Ebenezer (I Sam. IV. I) which is mentioned in the Onomasticon (s.v. Ebenezer) as near Beth Shemesh. The village is 2 miles east of 'Ain Shems."

Baldensperger, writing in 1893, stated that the village's residents had been Greek Orthodox until they converted to Islam at a "very recent date [...] perhaps it was about the beginning of this century". He noted that the Christians of Beit Jala and the citizens of the village continue to share the same names, and added that the village's original Greek New Testament is still kept in the church in Beit Jala. In another article, he mentioned that women in Dayr Aban have small crosses tattooed on their foreheads. Yitzhak Ben-Zvi mentioned a local tradition according which elderly Muslim women at Dayr Aban preserved old miniature crosses. H. Stephan wrote that persecutions brought Christians from Dayr Aban to seek refuge at Beit Jala and Ramallah, where they stayed in touch with family members that continued to live in the village as Muslims.

In 1896, the population of Der Aban was estimated to be about 921 persons.

=== British Mandate era ===
In the 1922 census of Palestine, conducted by the British Mandate authorities, Dayr Aban had a population of 1,214 inhabitants, all Muslims, increasing in the 1931 census to 1,534 inhabitants, in 321 houses.

In the 1945 statistics, the village had a total population of 2,100 Arabs; 10 Christians and 2,090 Muslims, with a total of 22,734 dunums of land. Of this, Arabs used 1,580 dunams for irrigable land or plantations, 14,925 for cereals, while 54 dunams were built-up (urban) Arab land.

Dayr Aban had a mosque and a pipeline transporting water from 'Ayn Marjalayn, 5 km to the east. The village contains three khirbats: Khirbat Jinna'ir, Khirbat Haraza, and Khirbat al-Suyyag.

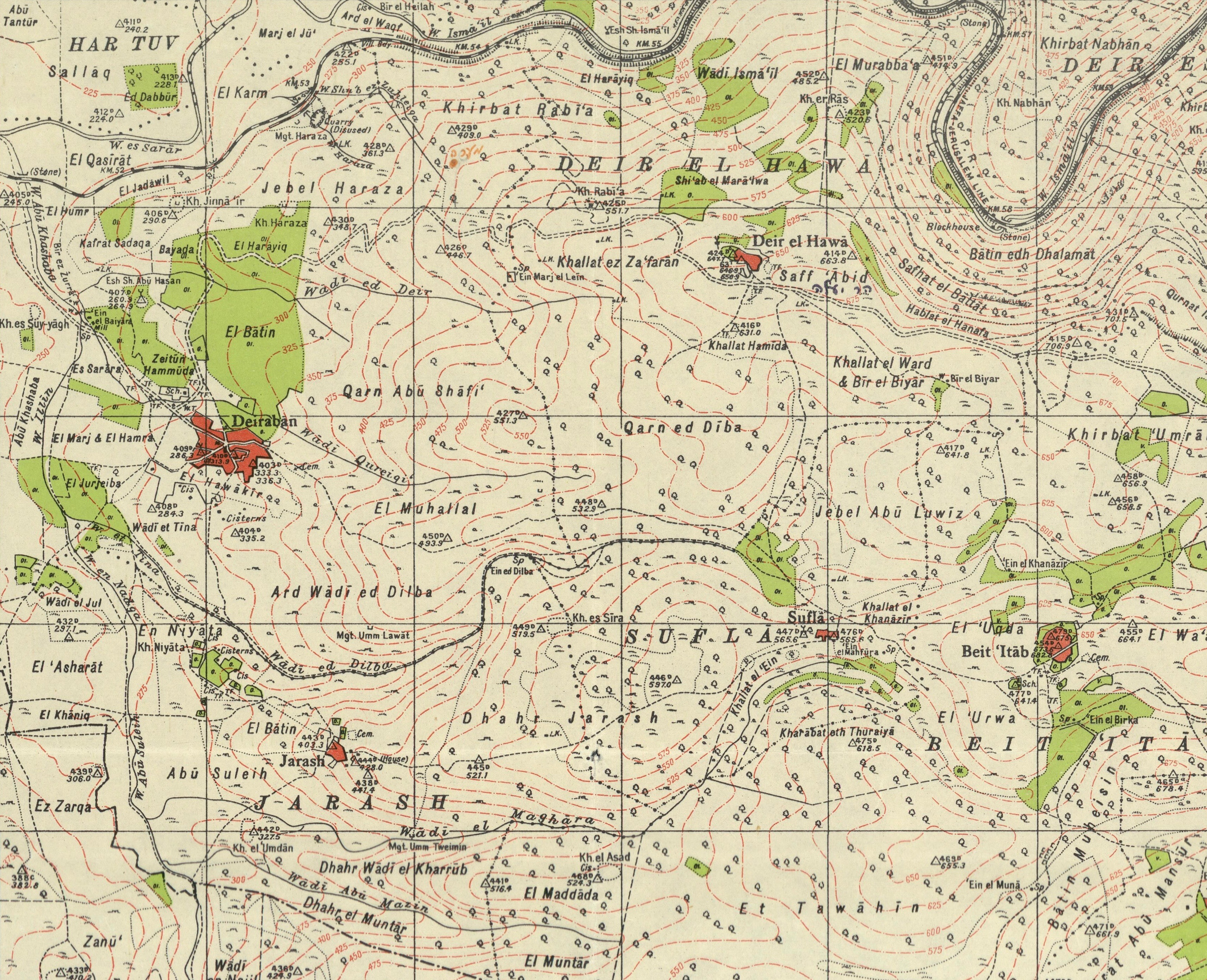
Dayr Aban (Deiraban), Mandate survey, 1:20,000

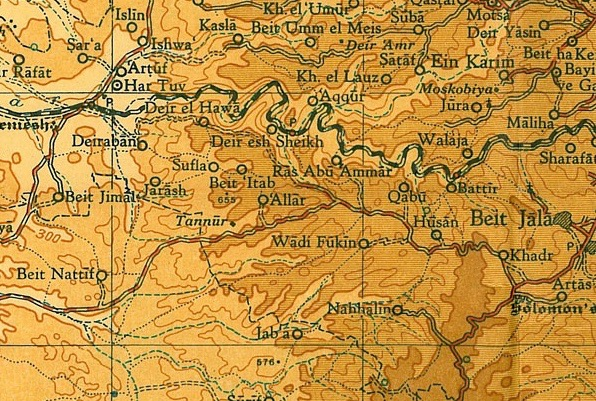
Dayr Aban (Deiraban), 1945, 1:20,000

=== 1948, aftermath ===
On 4 August 1948, two weeks into the Second truce of the 1948 Arab–Israeli War, Grand Mufti of Jerusalem and Palestinian nationalist Amin al Husseini noted that ‘for two weeks now . . . the Jews have continued with their attacks on the Arab villages and outposts in all areas. Stormy battles are continuing in the villages of Sataf, Deiraban, Beit Jimal, Ras Abu ‘Amr, ‘Aqqur, and ‘Artuf . . .’

The village became depopulated on 19–20 October 1948, after a military assault during Operation Ha-Har. Through the second half of 1948, the IDF, under Ben-Gurion’s tutelage, continued to destroy Arab villages, including Dayr Aban on 22 October 1948.

After the war, the ruin of Dayr Abban remained under Israeli control under the terms of the 1949 Armistice Agreement between Israel and Jordan, until such time that the agreement was dissolved in 1967.

The moshav of Mahseya was later established near the site of the old village, on the land of Dayr Aban, as was Tzora, Beit Shemesh and Yish'i.

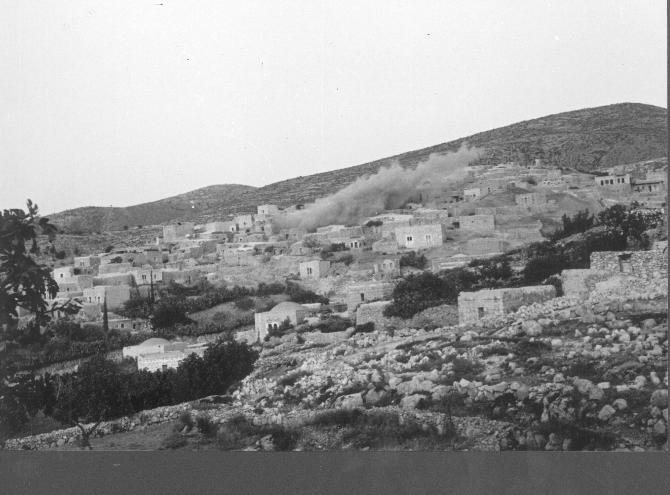
Houses being blown up by the Harel Brigade October 1948

== Etymology ==
The prefix "Dayr" which appears in many village names is of Aramaic and Syriac-Aramaic origin, and has the connotation of "habitation," or "dwelling place," usually given to places where there was once a Christian population, or settlement of monks. In most cases, a monastery was formerly built there, and, throughout time, the settlement expanded. Dayr Aban would, therefore, literally mean, "the Monastery of Aban."

== Gallery ==
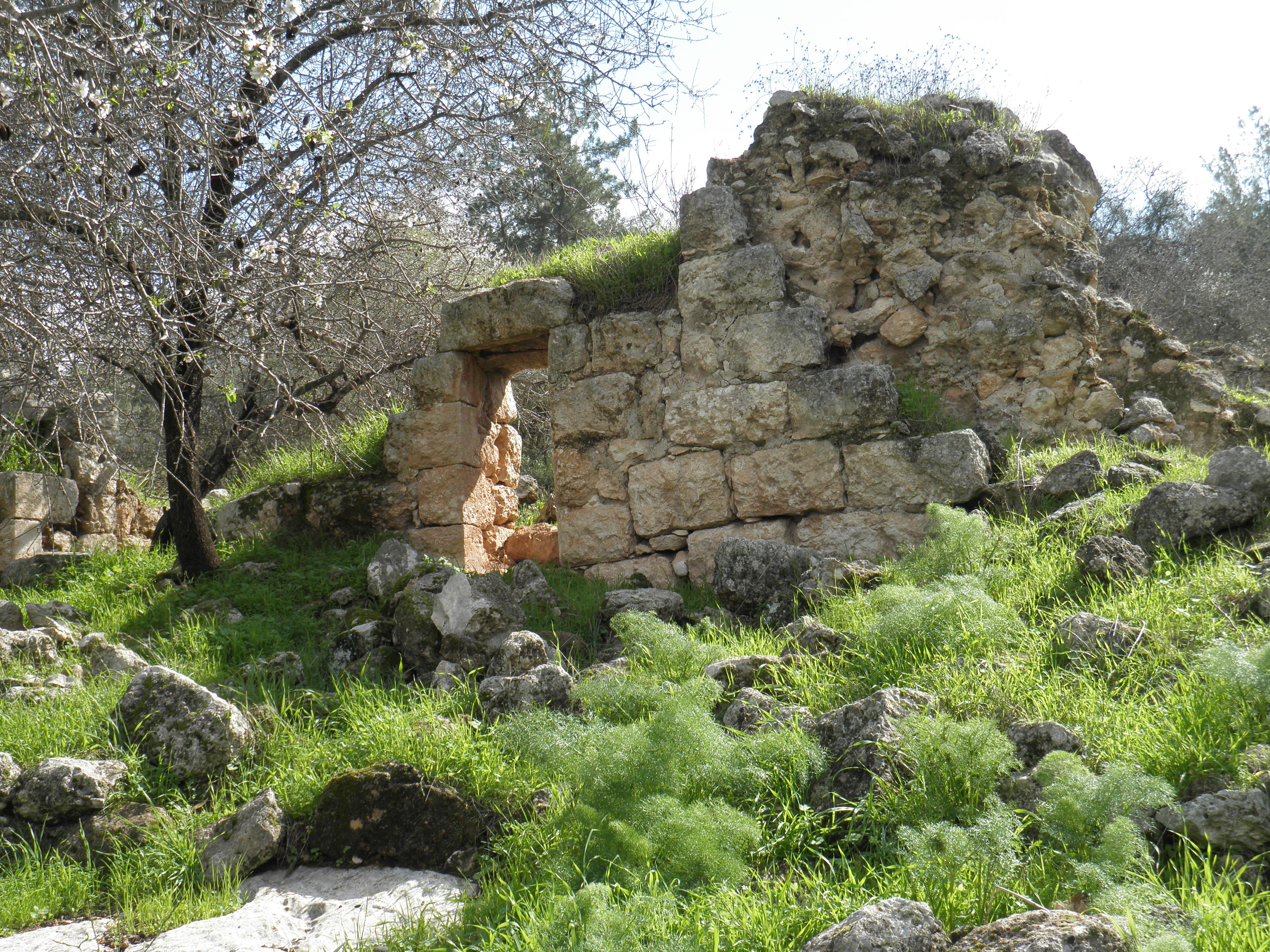
Dayr Aban-Ruin

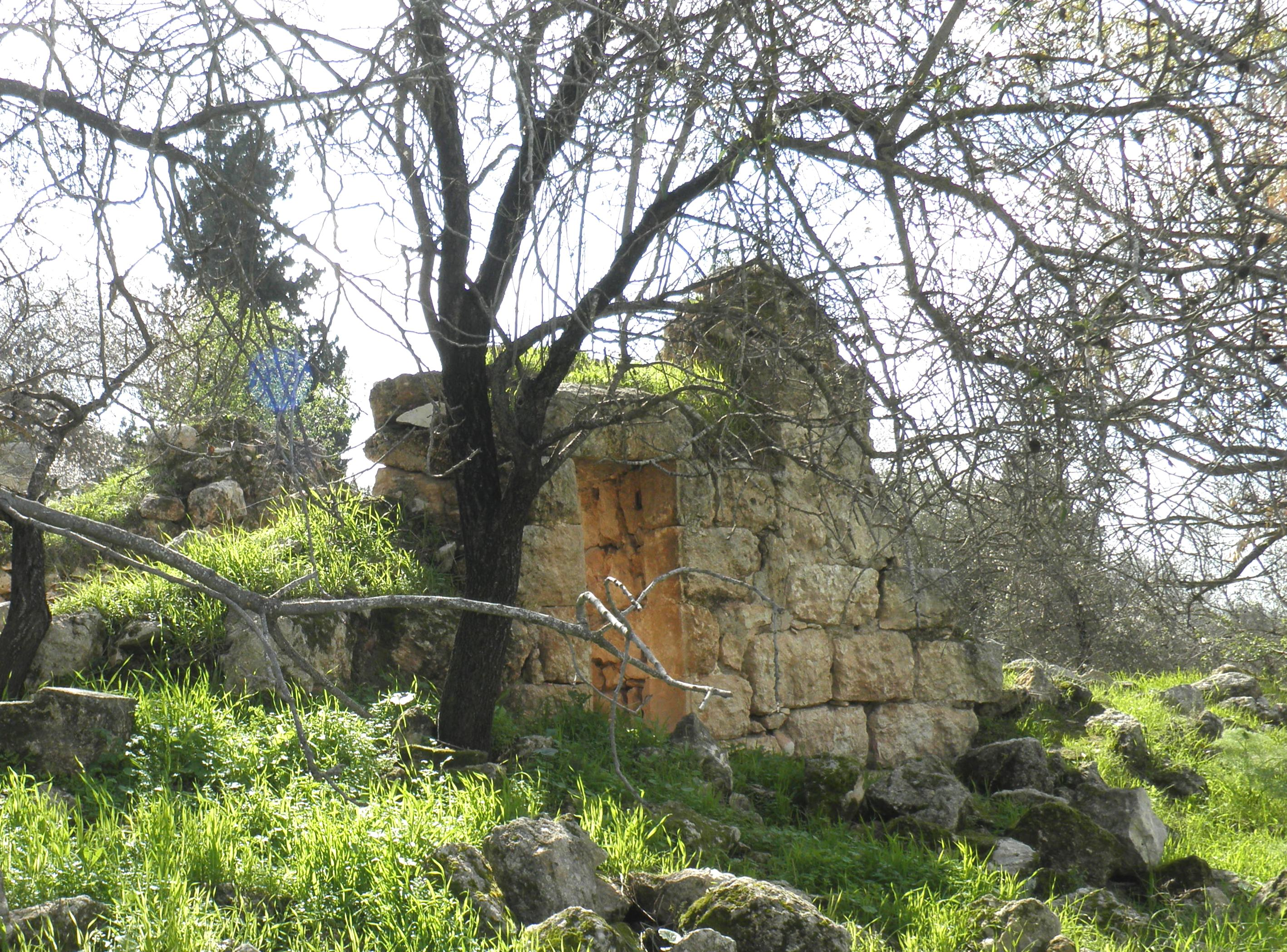
Dayr Aban, stone wall

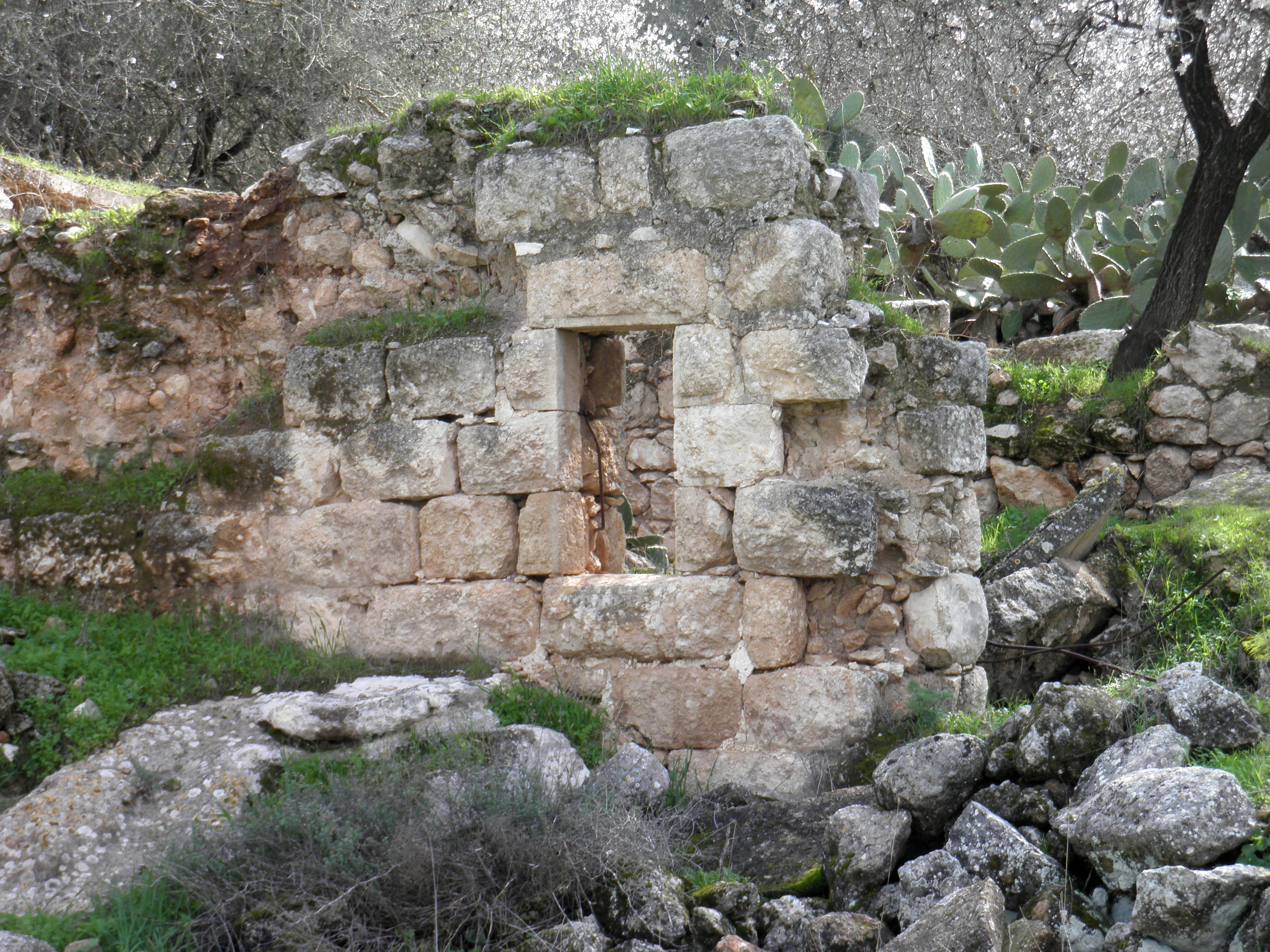
Dayr Aban, stone façade

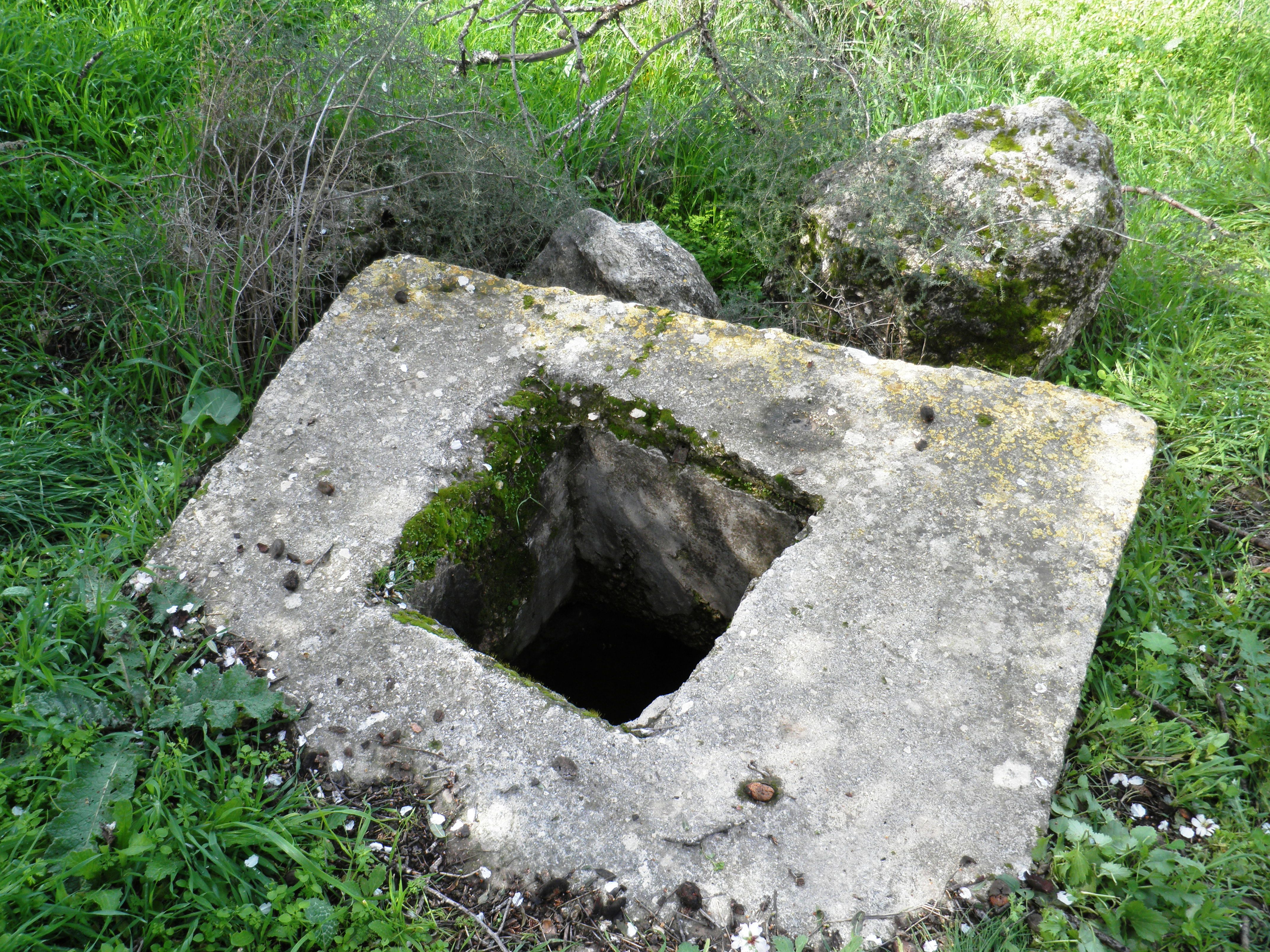
Dayr Aban, Cistern

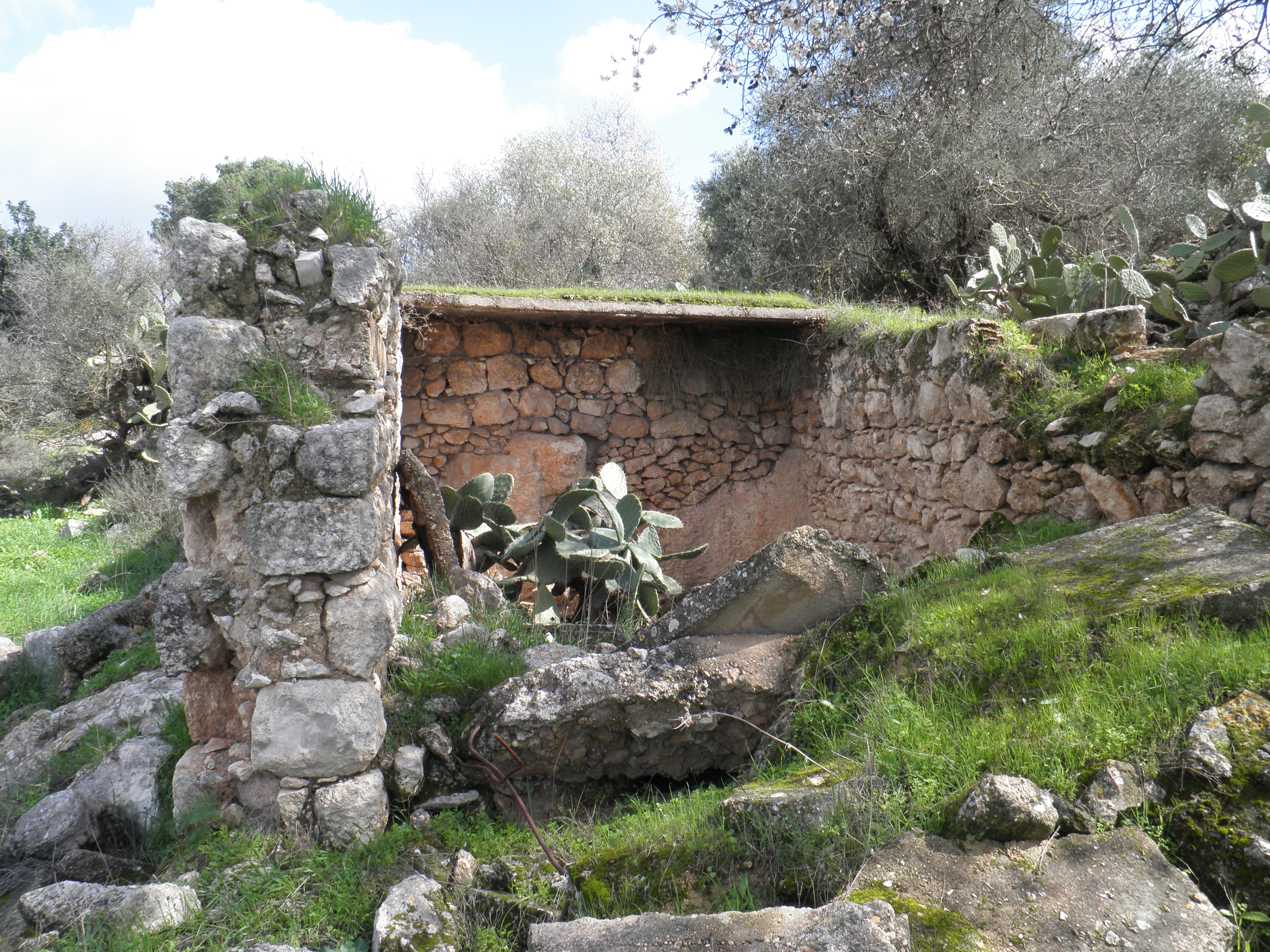
Dayr Aban

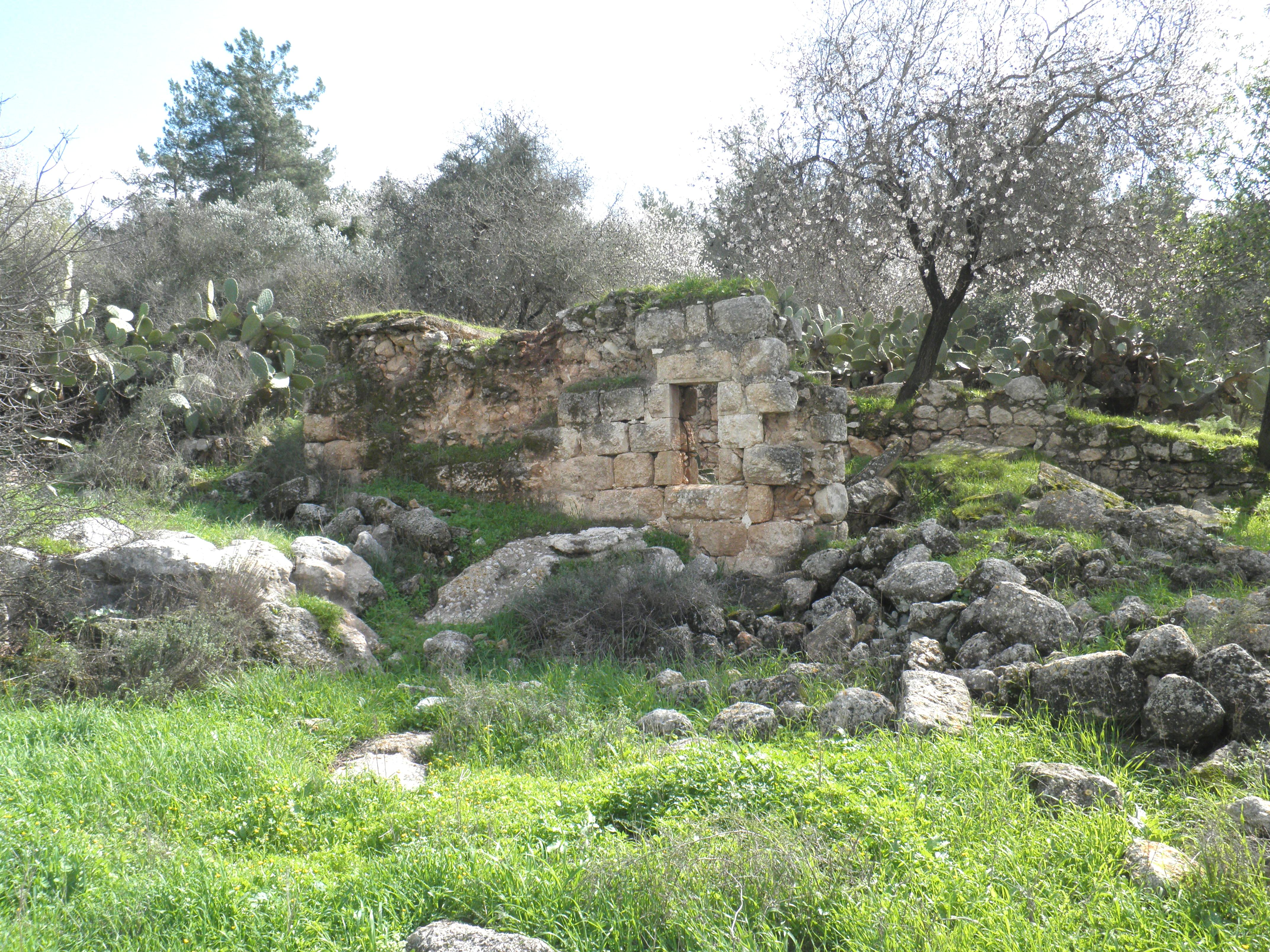
Dayr Aban-Ruin

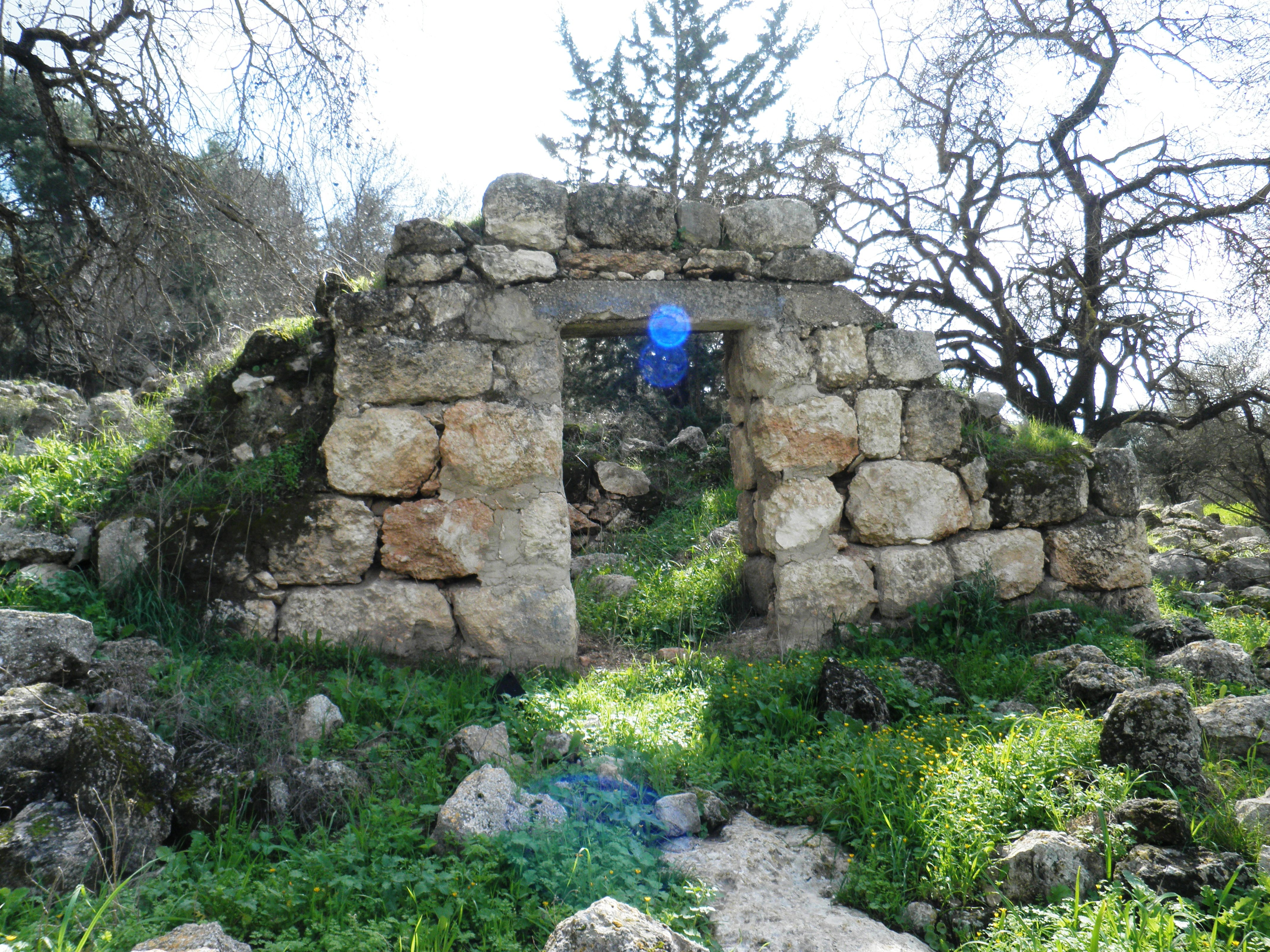
Dayr Aban, in sunlight

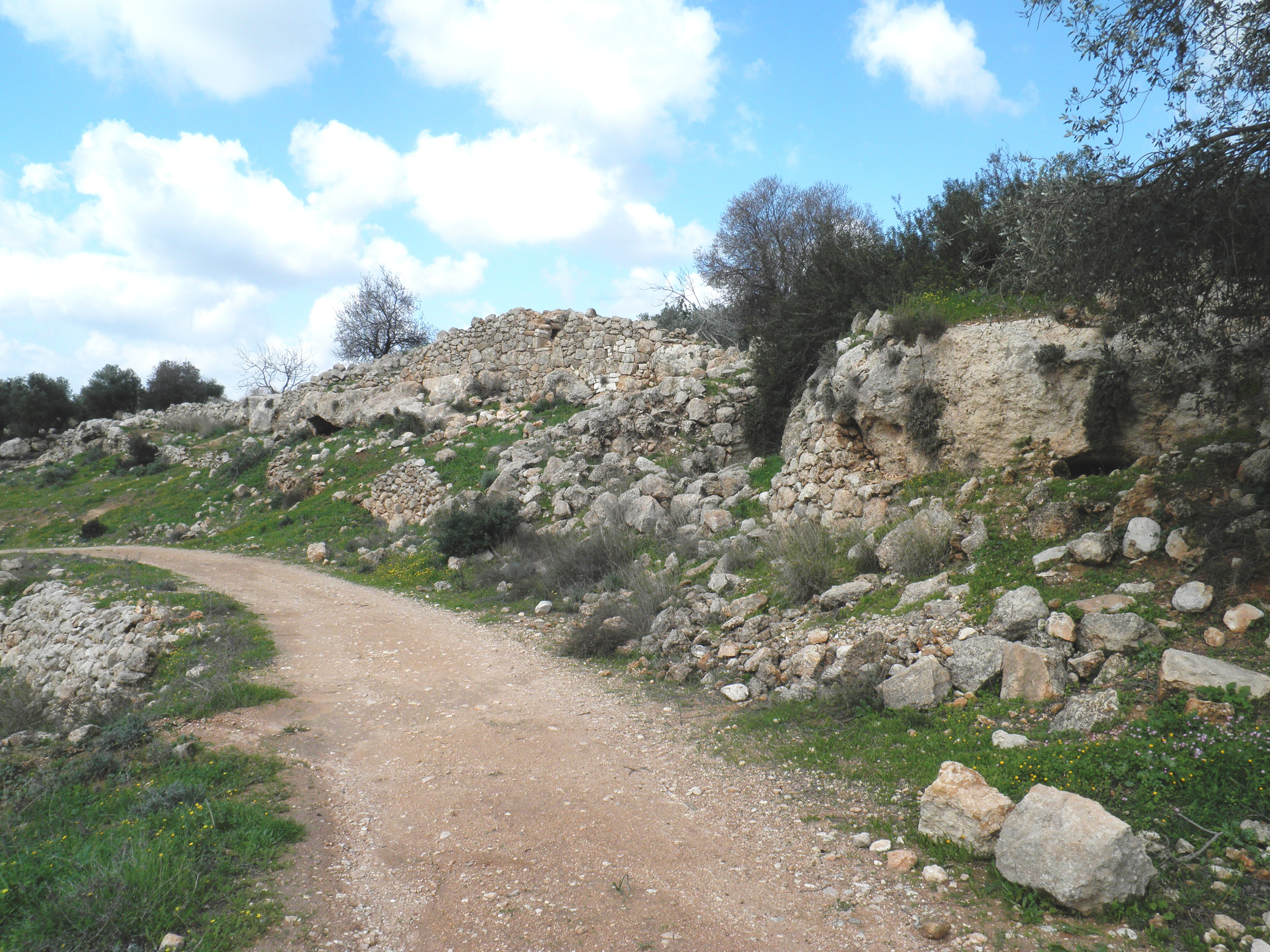
Ruins of Dayr Aban, wall

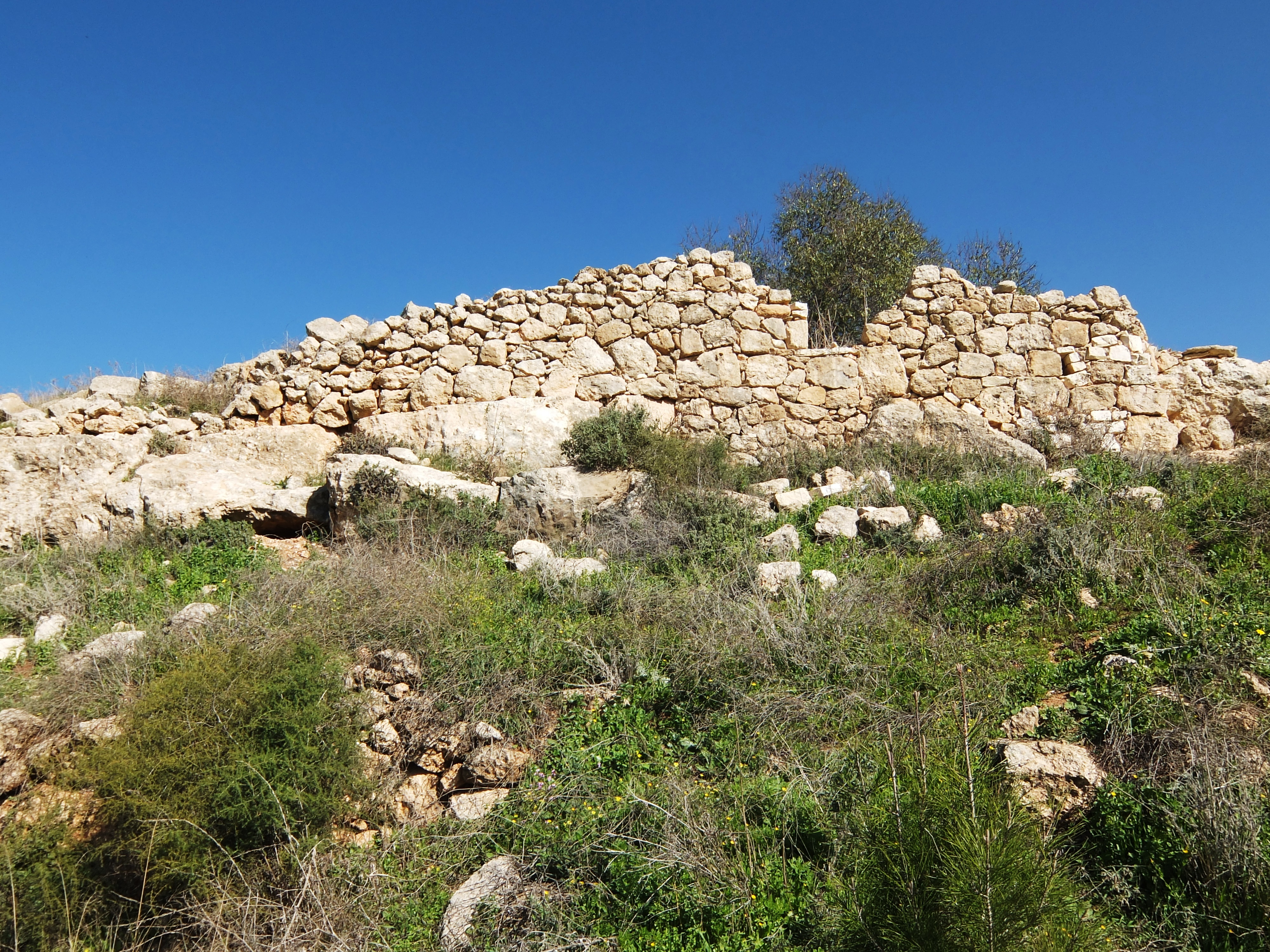
The outer wall of structure in Dayr Aban

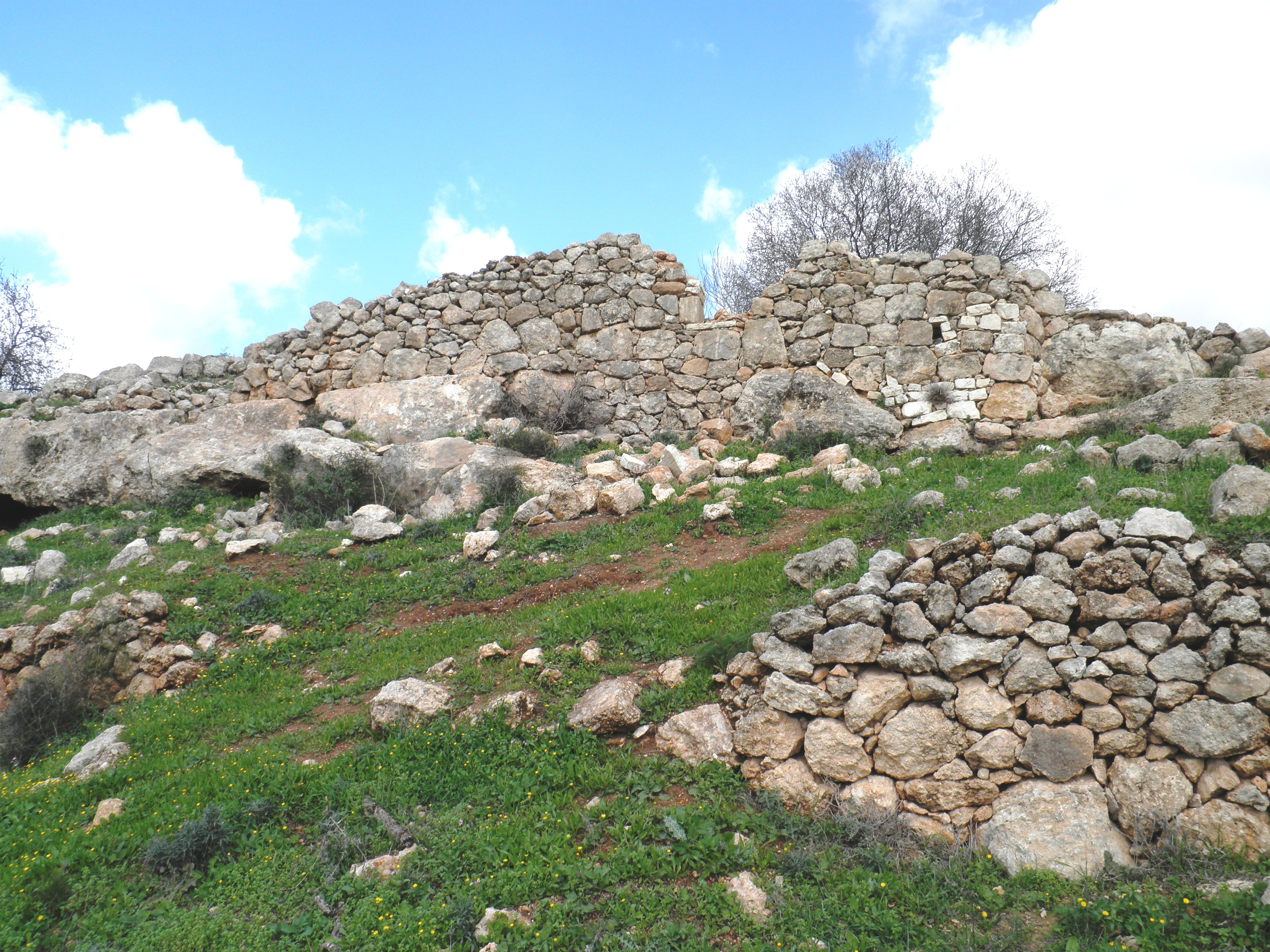
Ruins of Dayr Aban

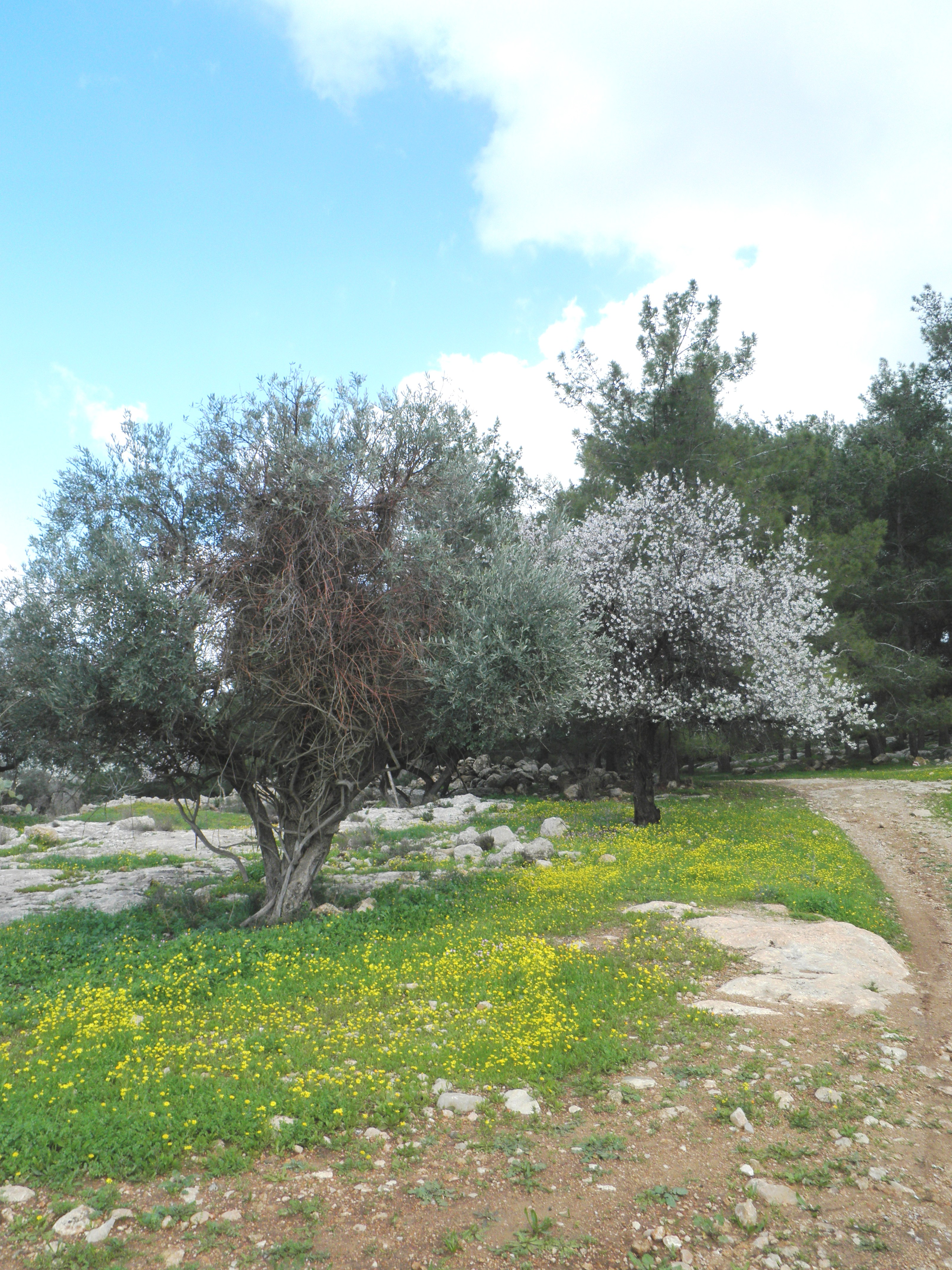
Dayr Aban, Olive and Almond Tree

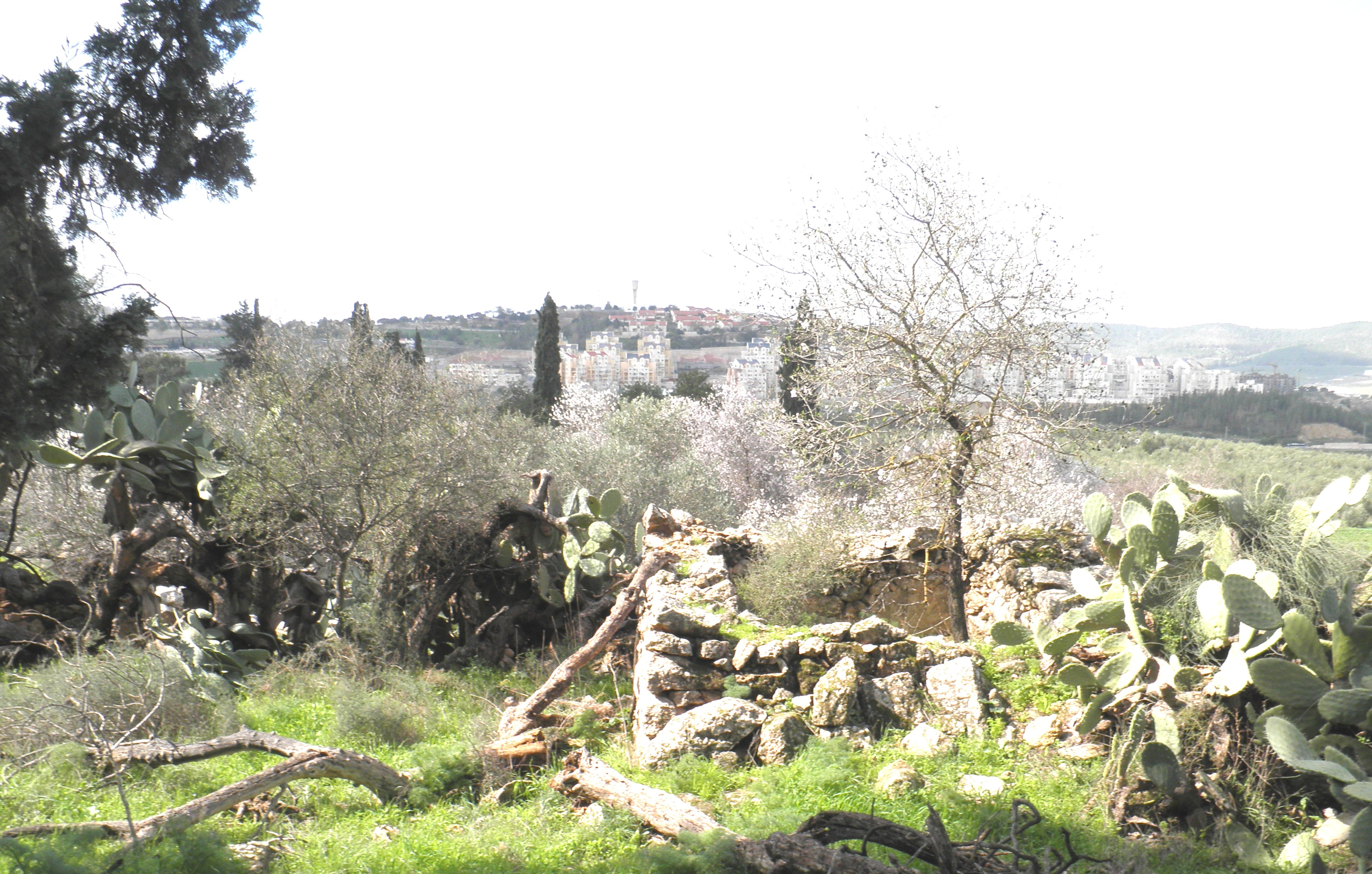
Dayr Aban on the Background of Beit Shemesh

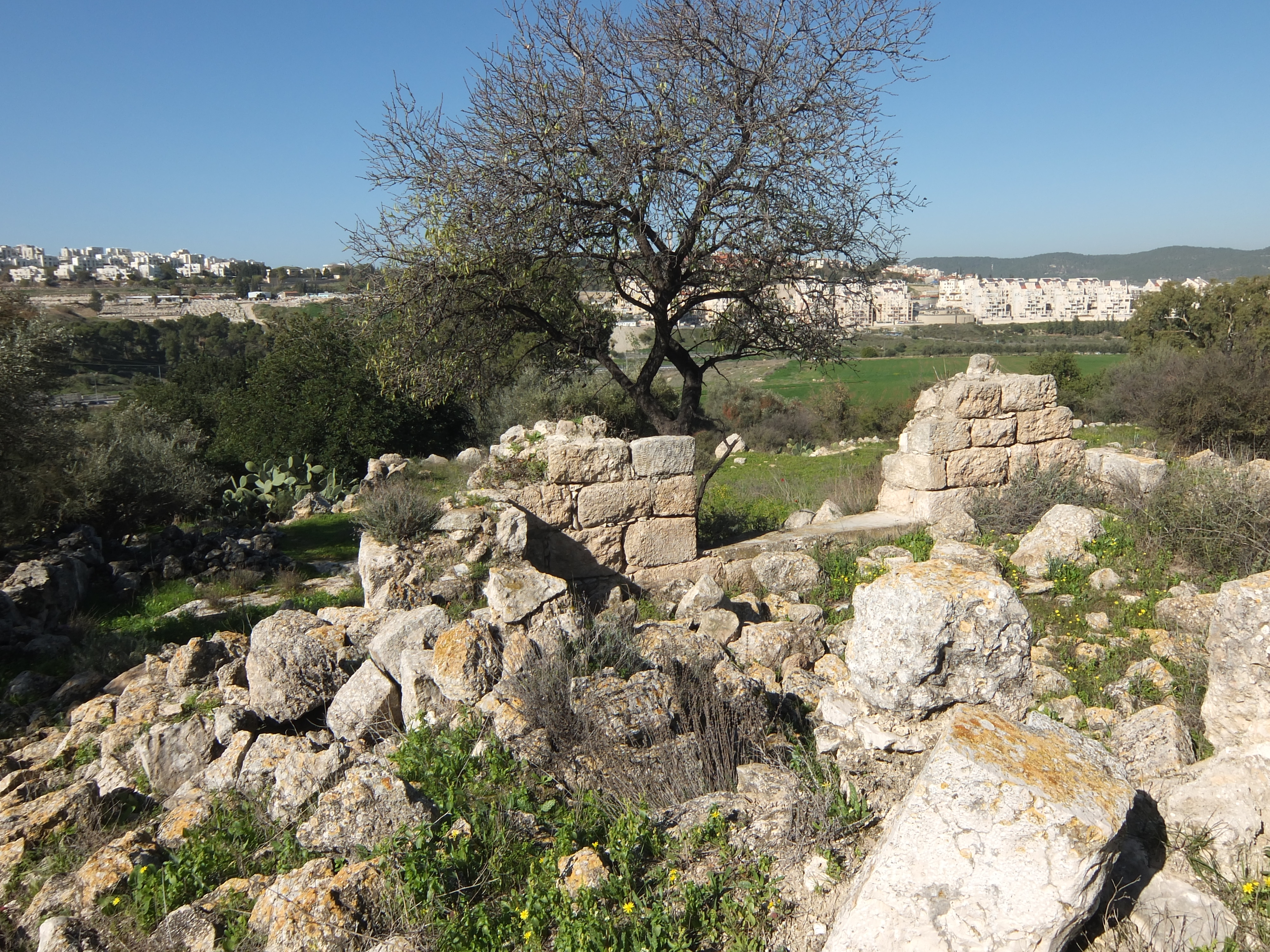
The ruins of Dayr Aban overlooking Beit Shemesh

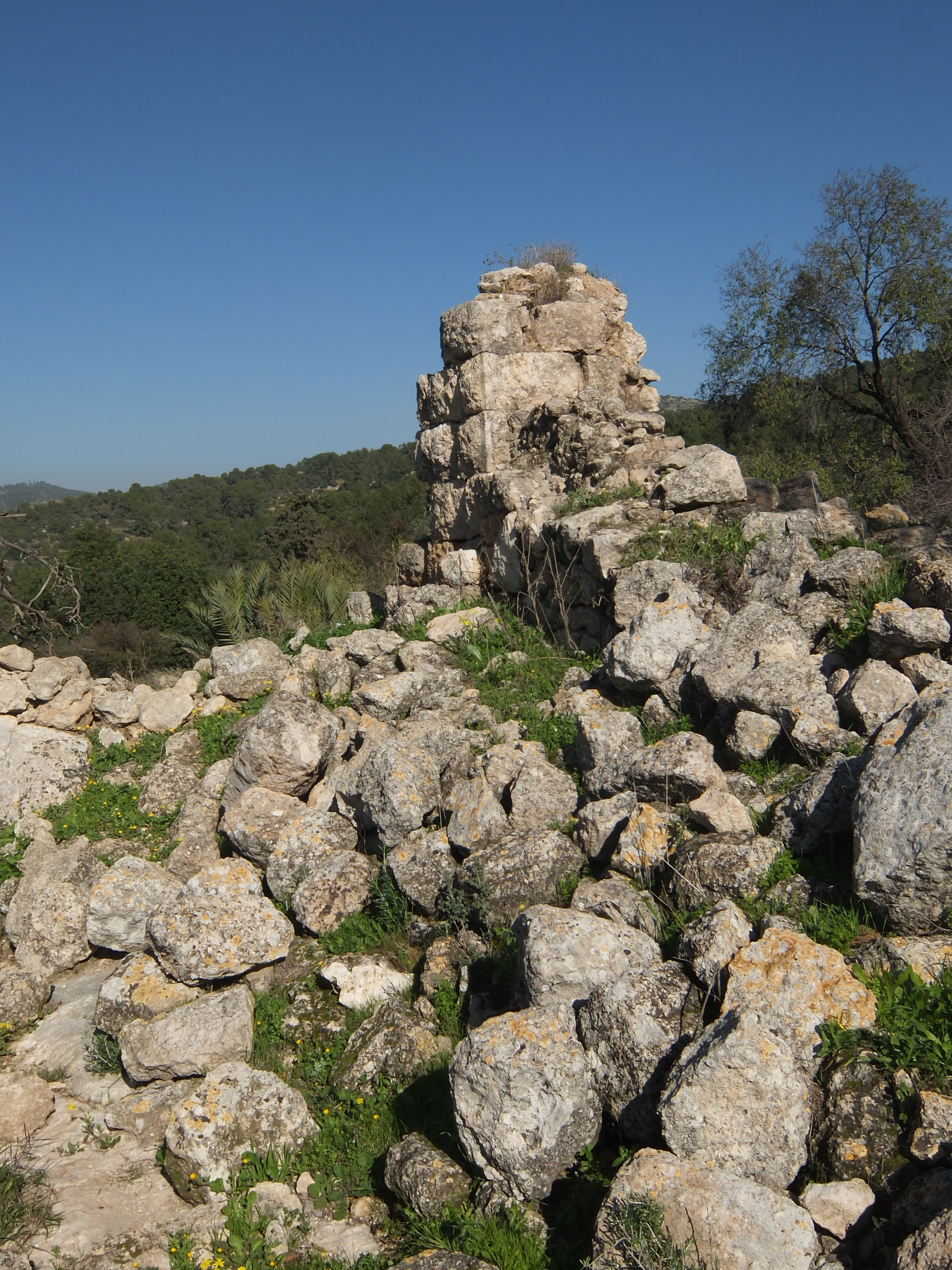
Projecting wall, in Dayr Aban

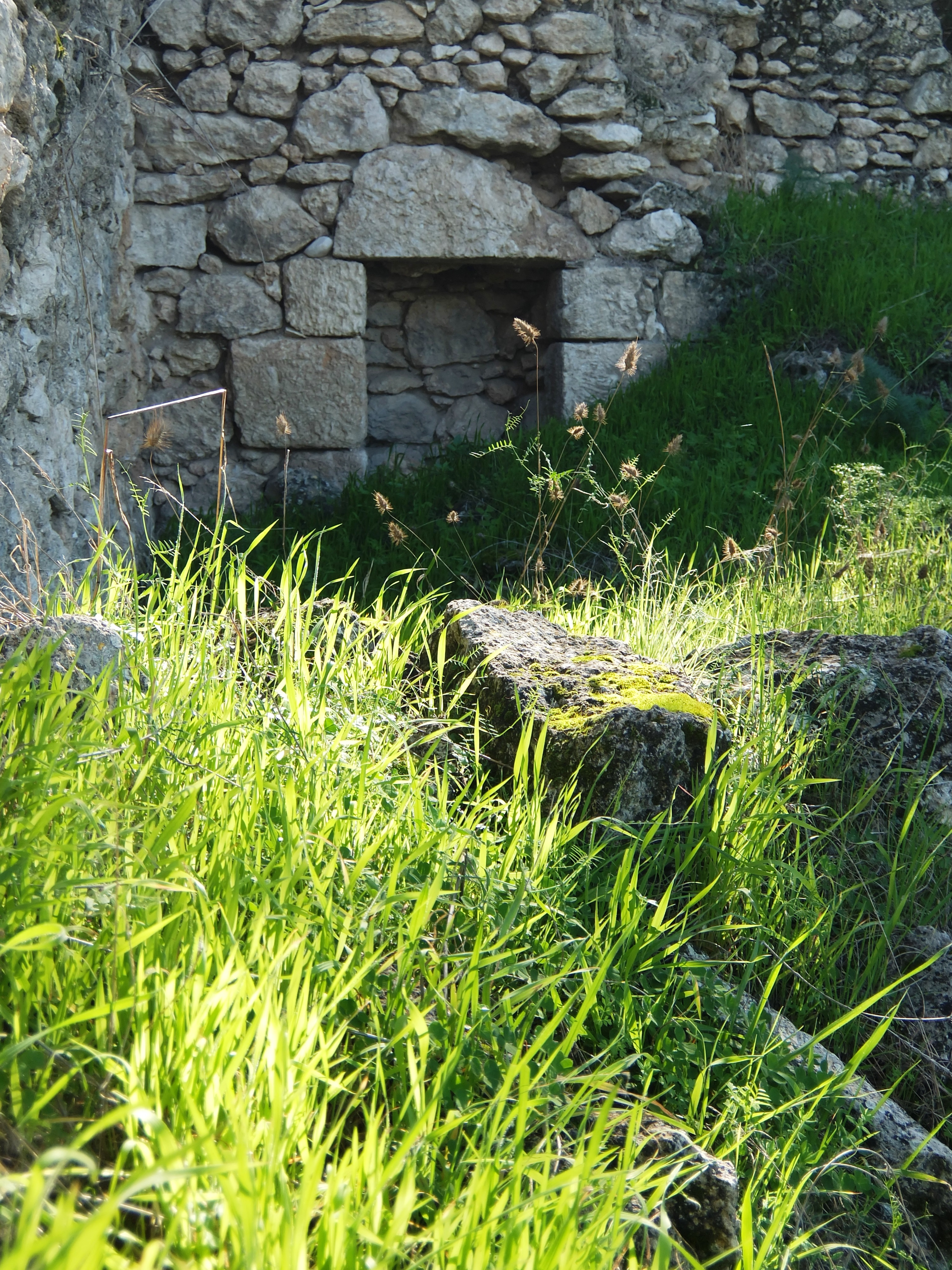
What remains of the inside wall of a house, with niche in wall

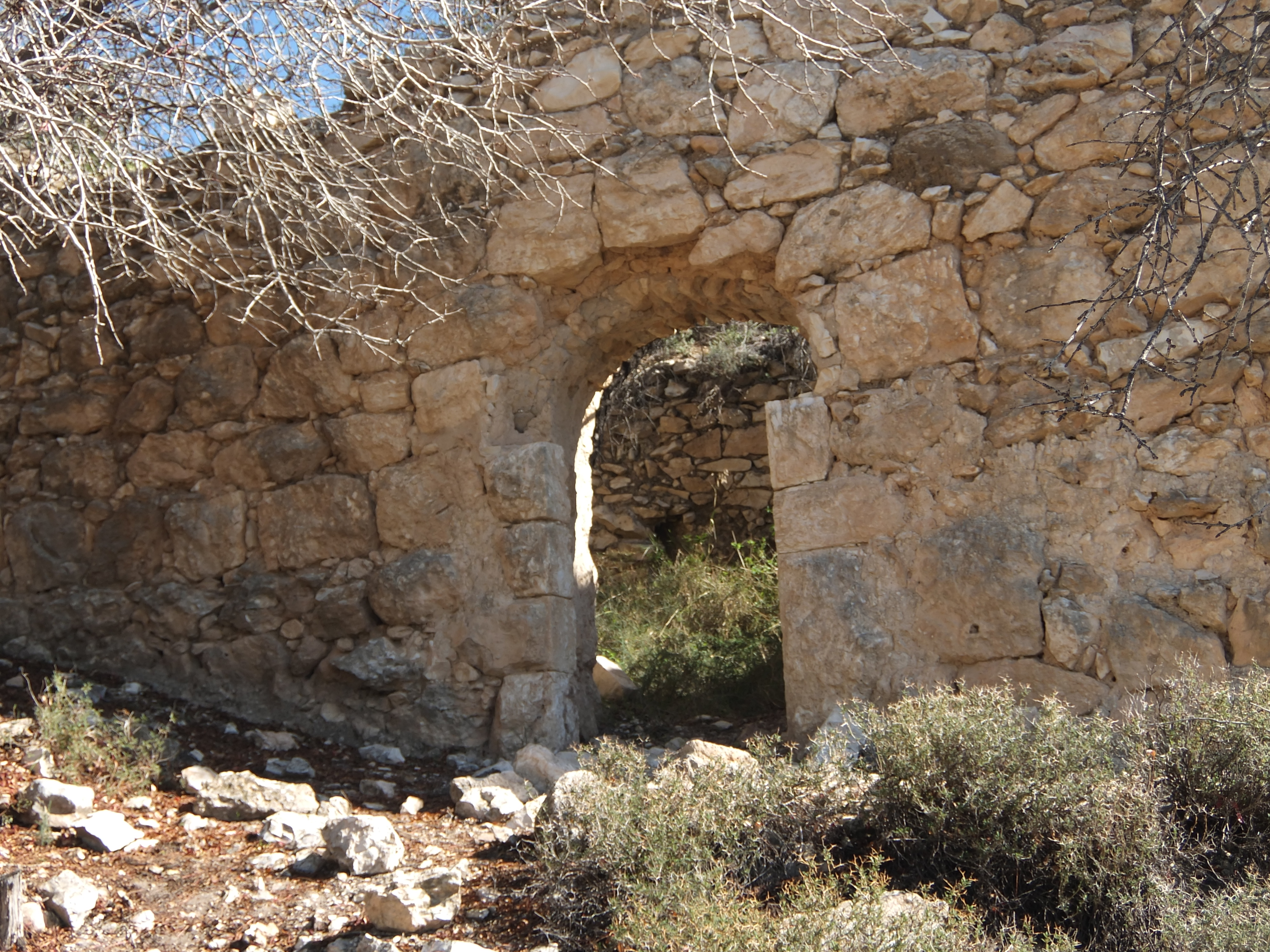
Front wall of house in Dayr Aban

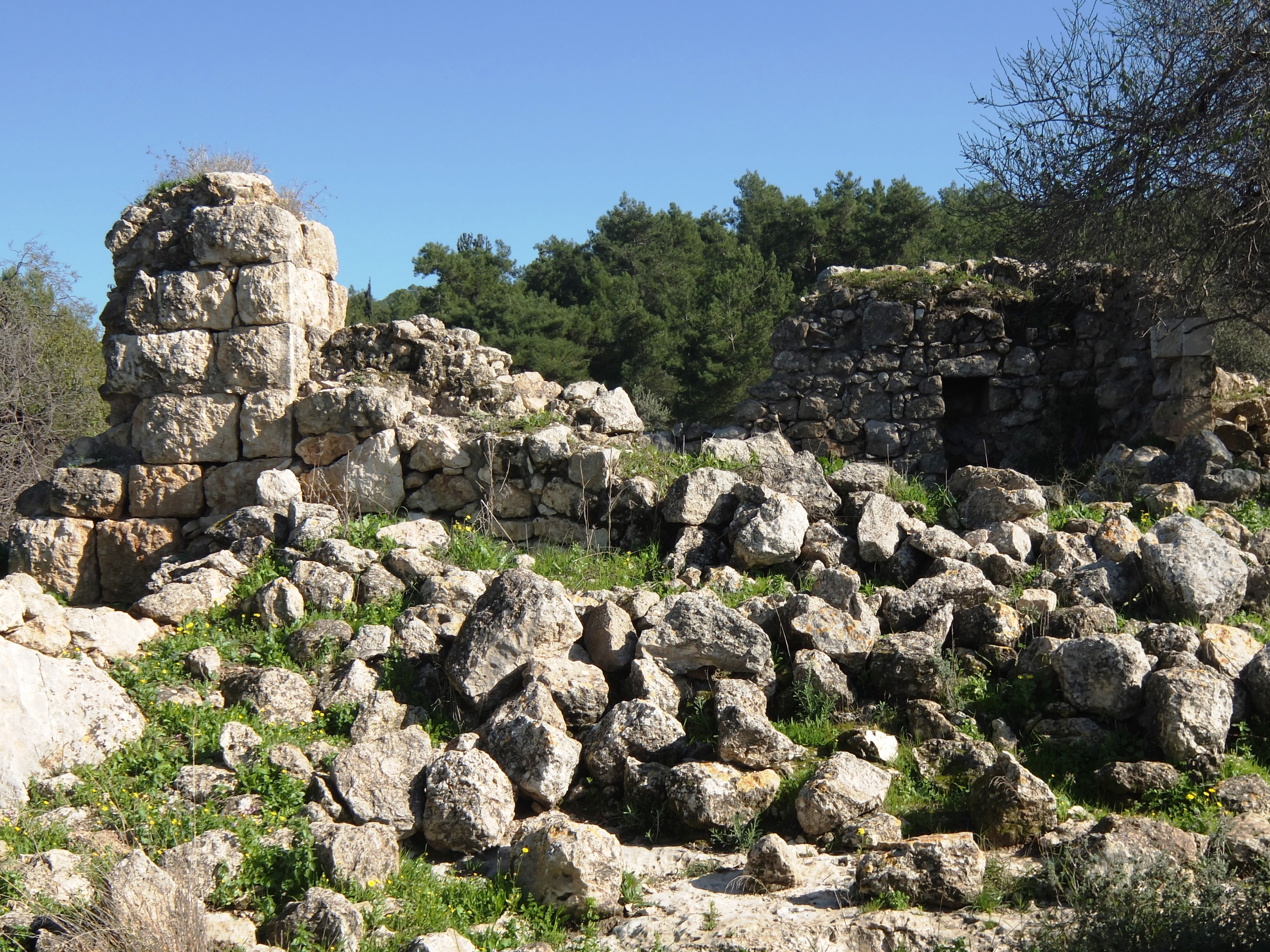
Razed buildings in Dayr Aban

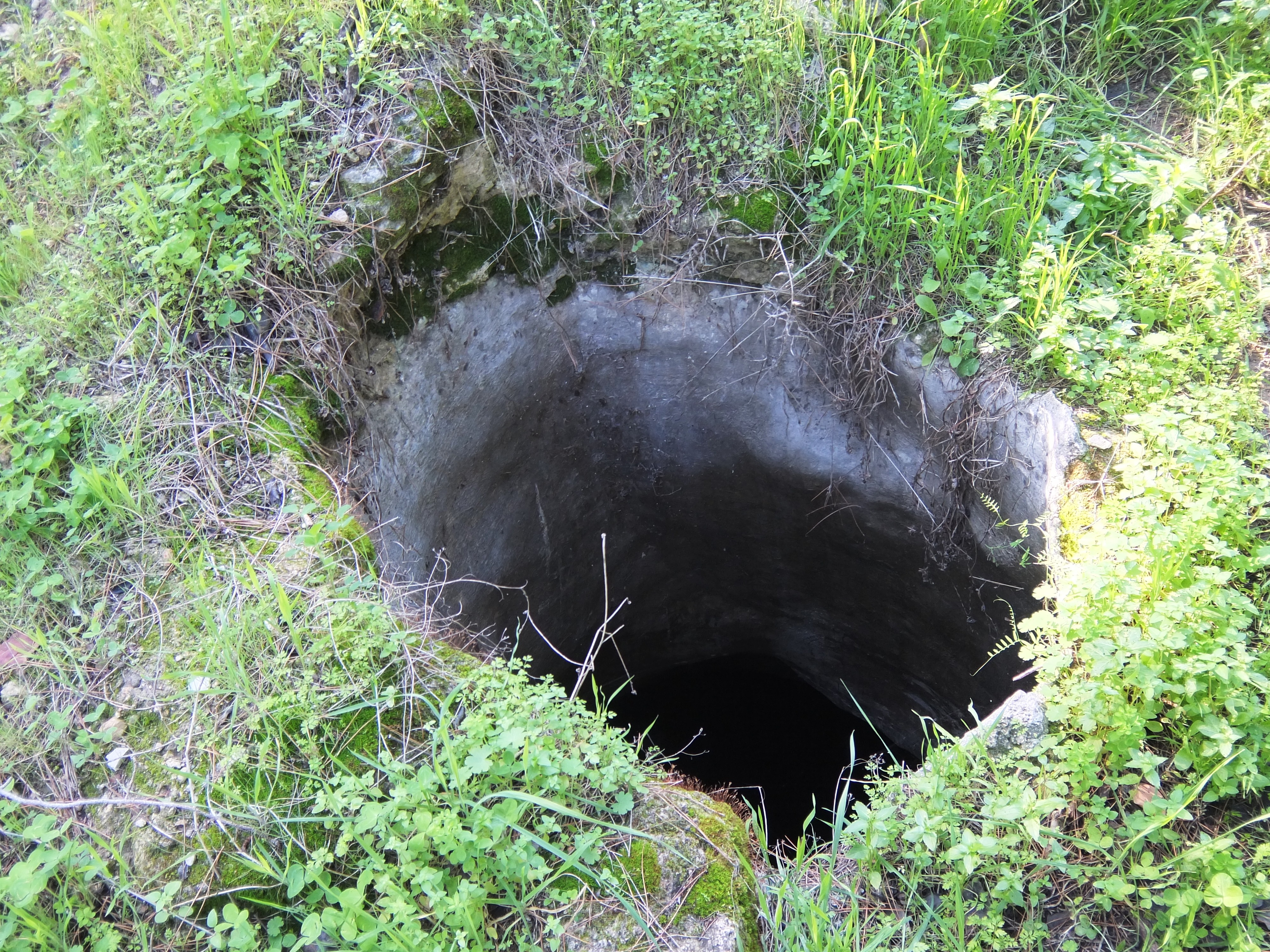
Mouth of pit, one of many in Dayr Aban

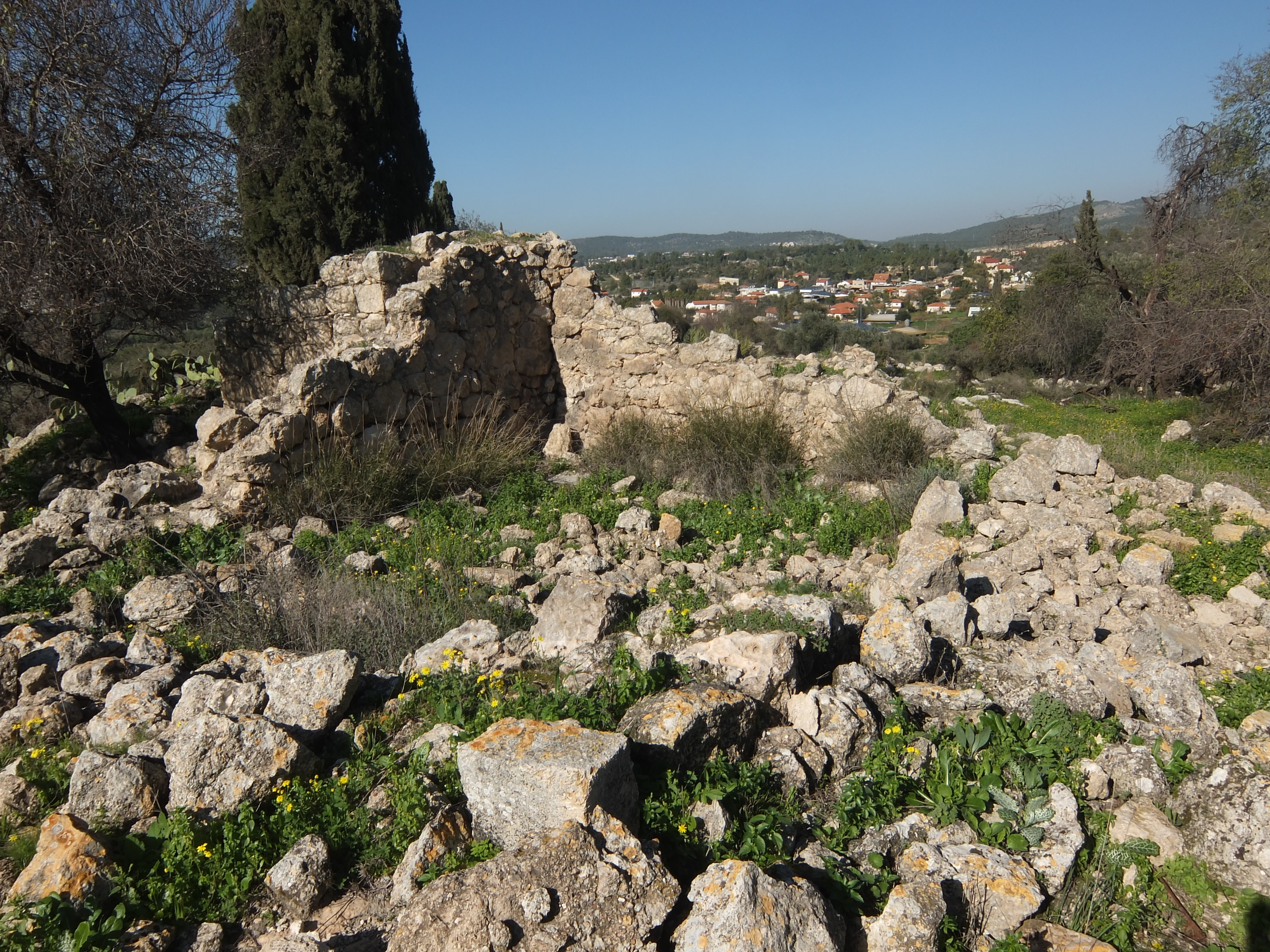
Razed structures in Dayr Aban

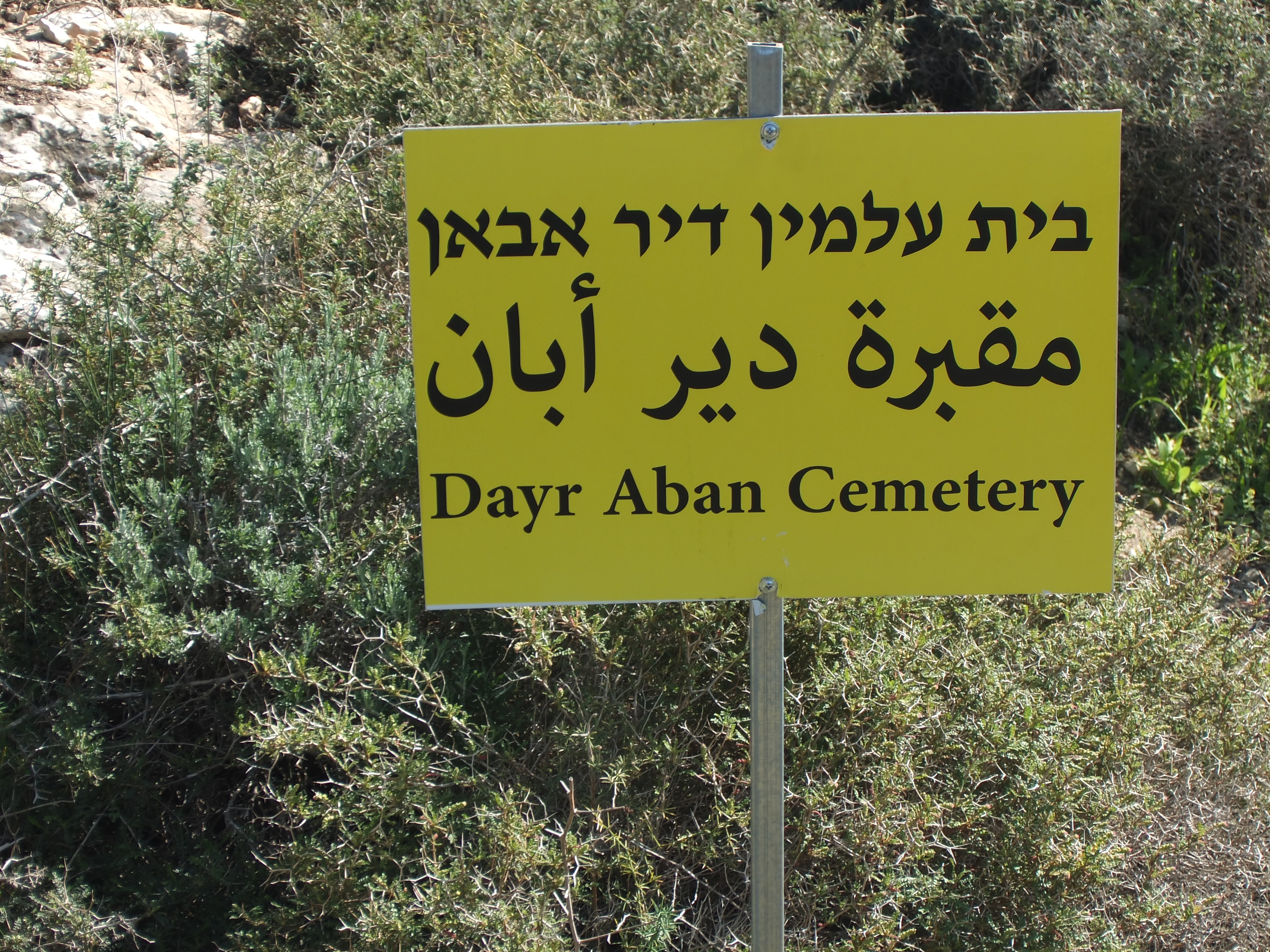
A sign post of the cemetery in Dayr Aban

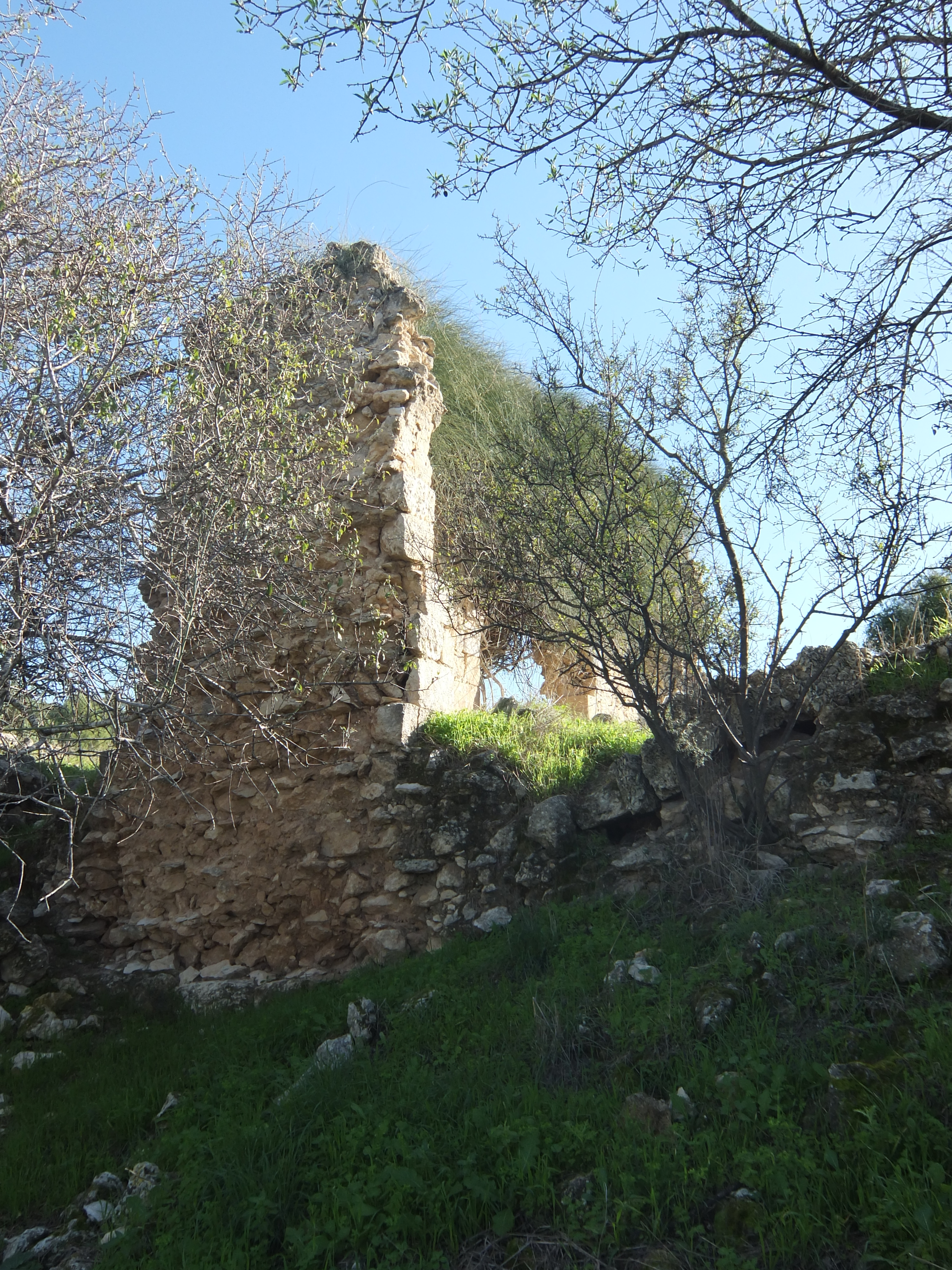
What remains of a house still stands tall

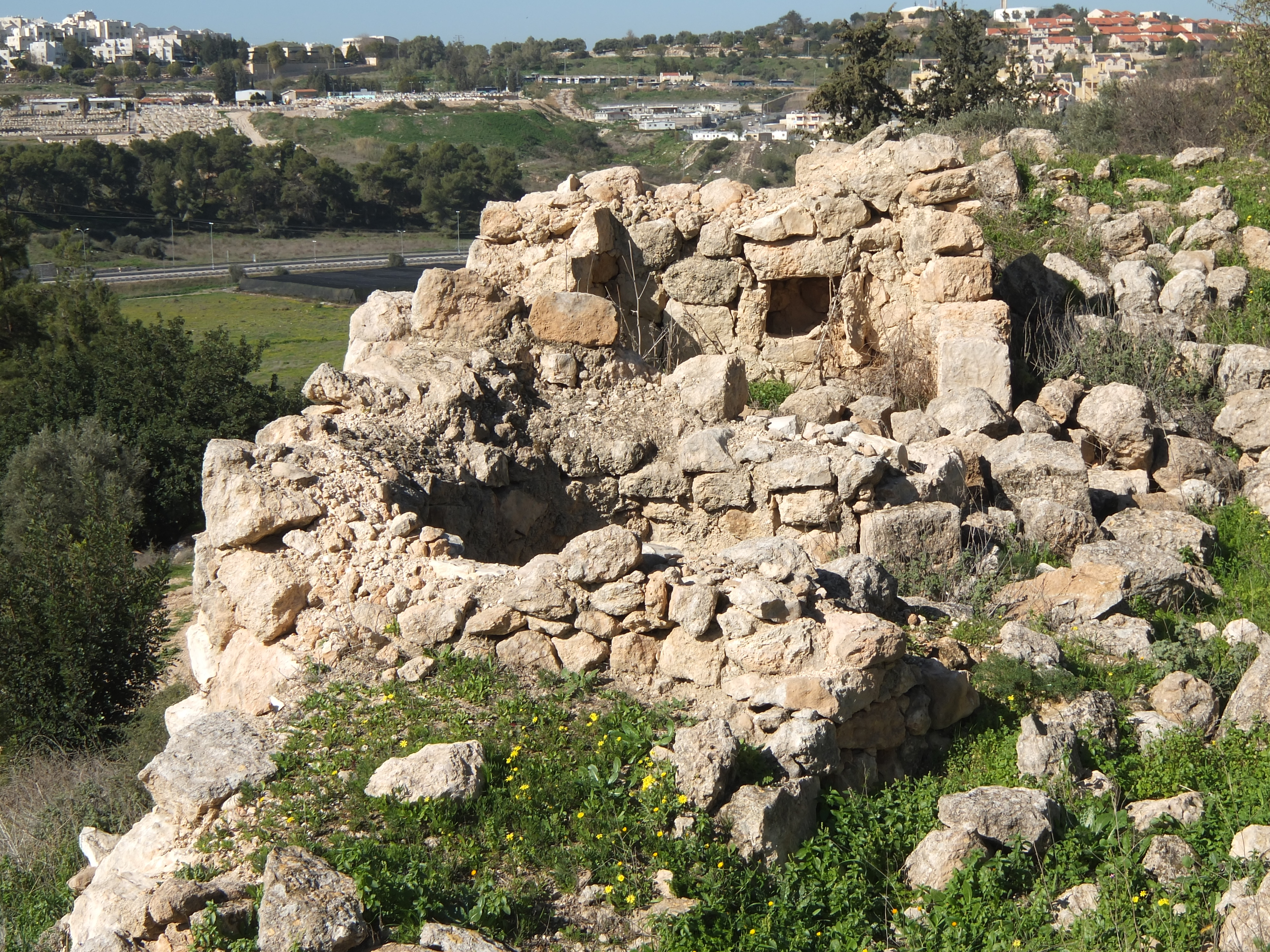
Old structures in Dayr Aban

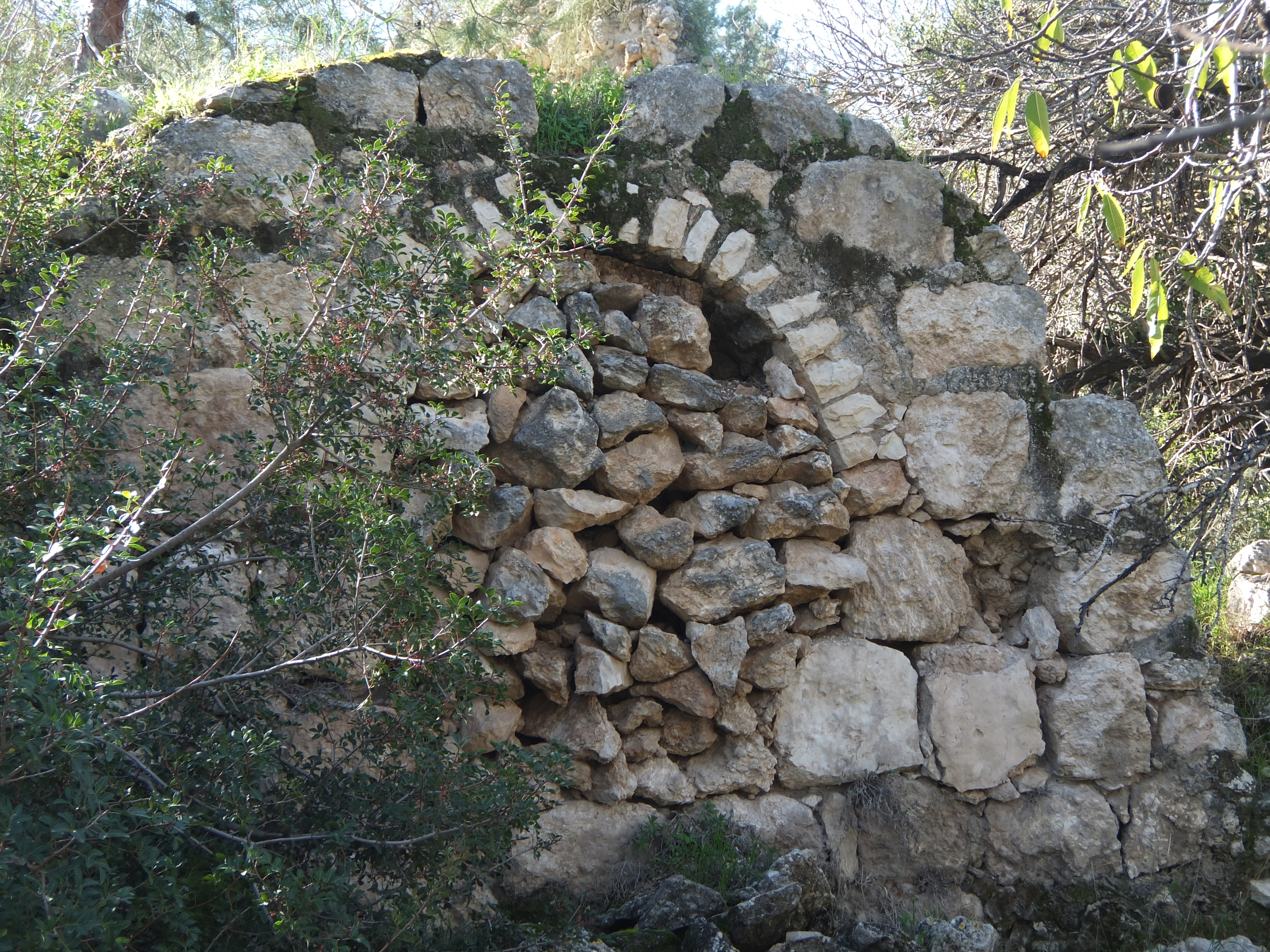
Sealed Archway in Dayr Aban

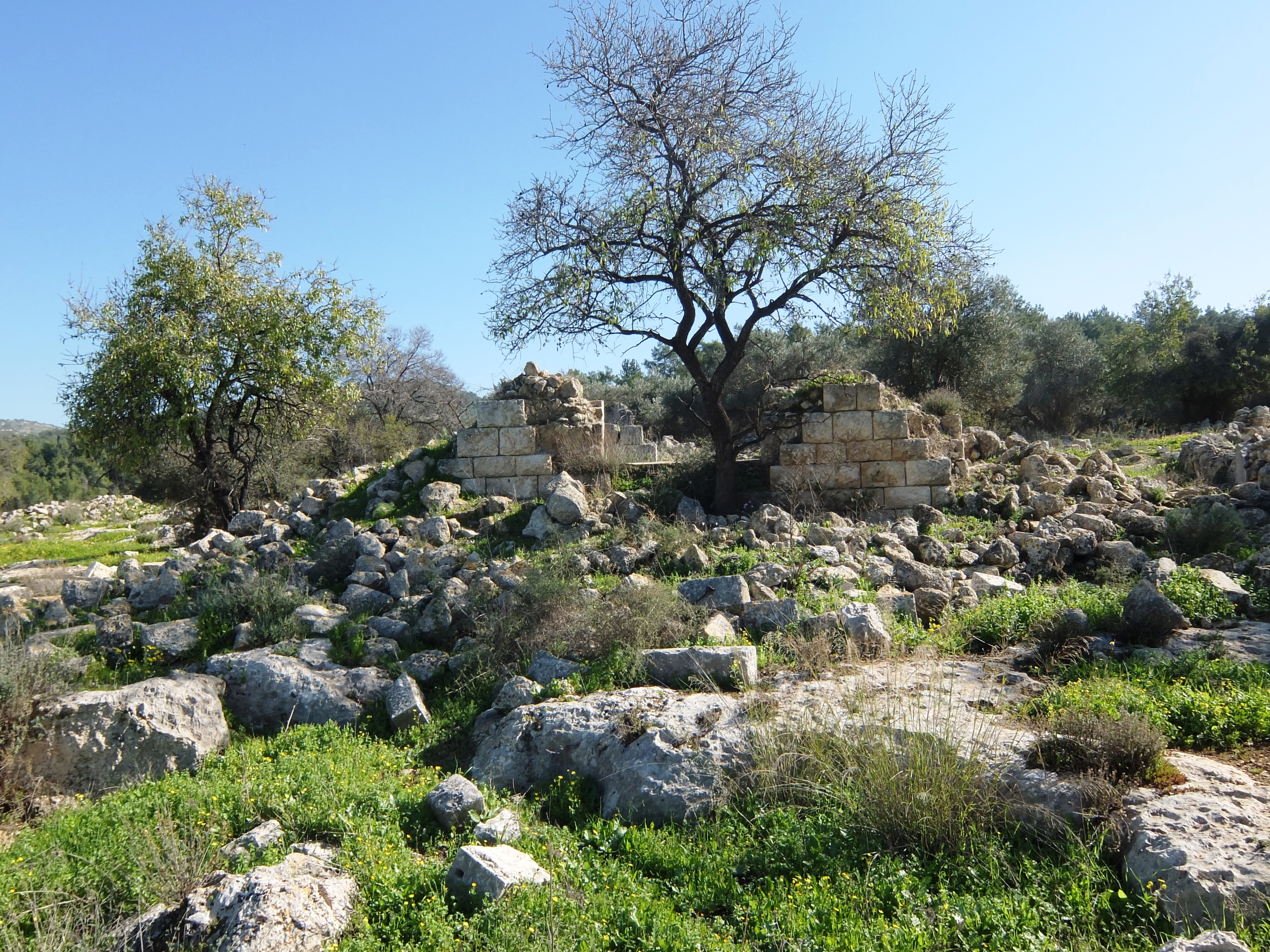
House and tree amidst ruins, in Dayr Aban

== Bibliography ==
- Barron, J. B., ed. (1923). Palestine: Report and General Abstracts of the Census of 1922. Government of Palestine.
- Conder, C. R. (1876). "Notes from the Memoir". Quarterly Statement - Palestine Exploration Fund. 8: 149– 151.
- Conder, C.R.; Kitchener, H. H. (1883). The Survey of Western Palestine: Memoirs of the Topography, Orography, Hydrography, and Archaeology. Vol. 3. London: Committee of the Palestine Exploration Fund.
- Dauphin, C. (1998). La Palestine byzantine, Peuplement et Populations. BAR International Series 726 (in French). Vol. III : Catalogue. Oxford: Archeopress. ISBN 0-860549-05-4. (p. 909)
- Department of Statistics (1945). Village Statistics, April, 1945. Government of Palestine.
- Fetellus (1896). Fetellus (ca 1130 AD), Translated and Annotated by Rev. James Rose Macpherson. London: Palestine Pilgrims' Text Society.
- Guérin, V. (1869). Description Géographique Historique et Archéologique de la Palestine (in French). Vol. 1: Judee, pt. 2. Paris: L'Imprimerie Nationale.
- Hadawi, S. (1970). Village Statistics of 1945: A Classification of Land and Area ownership in Palestine. Palestine Liberation Organization Research Centre.
- Hartmann, M. (1883). "Die Ortschaftenliste des Liwa Jerusalem in dem türkischen Staatskalender für Syrien auf das Jahr 1288 der Flucht (1871)". Zeitschrift des Deutschen Palästina-Vereins. 6: 102–149.
- Hütteroth, W.-D.; Abdulfattah, K. (1977). Historical Geography of Palestine, Transjordan and Southern Syria in the Late 16th Century. Erlanger Geographische Arbeiten, Sonderband 5. Erlangen, Germany: Vorstand der Fränkischen Geographischen Gesellschaft. ISBN 3-920405-41-2.
- Khalidi, W. (1992). All That Remains: The Palestinian Villages Occupied and Depopulated by Israel in 1948. Washington D.C.: Institute for Palestine Studies. ISBN 0-88728-224-5.
- Mills, E., ed. (1932). Census of Palestine 1931. Population of Villages, Towns and Administrative Areas. Jerusalem: Government of Palestine.
- Morris, B. (2004). The Birth of the Palestinian Refugee Problem Revisited. Cambridge University Press. ISBN 978-0-521-00967-6.
- Palmer, E. H. (1881). The Survey of Western Palestine: Arabic and English Name Lists Collected During the Survey by Lieutenants Conder and Kitchener, R. E. Transliterated and Explained by E.H. Palmer. Committee of the Palestine Exploration Fund.
- Robinson, E.; Smith, E. (1841). Biblical Researches in Palestine, Mount Sinai and Arabia Petraea: A Journal of Travels in the year 1838. Vol. 3. Boston: Crocker & Brewster.
- Schick, C. (1896). "Zur Einwohnerzahl des Bezirks Jerusalem". Zeitschrift des Deutschen Palästina-Vereins. 19: 120–127.
- Socin, A. (1879). "Alphabetisches Verzeichniss von Ortschaften des Paschalik Jerusalem". Zeitschrift des Deutschen Palästina-Vereins. 2: 135–163.
