= Mahseya =

Mahseya: מחסיה (Hebrew)
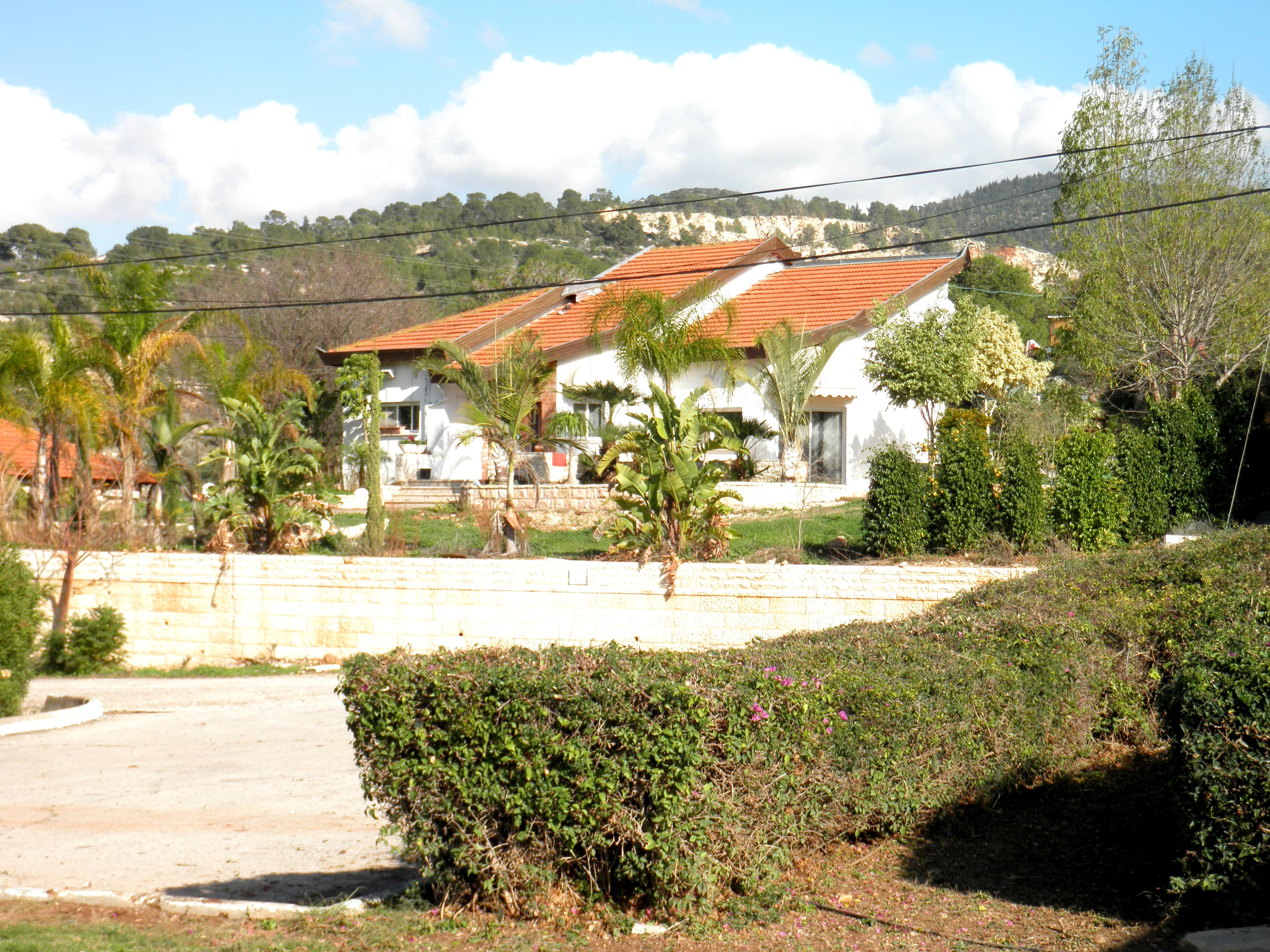

- Location within Jerusalem District
- Coordinates: 31°44′54″N 35°0′23″E
- Country: Israel
- District: Jerusalem
- Council: Mateh Yehuda
- Affiliation: Hapoel HaMizrachi
- Founded: 1950
- Founder: Moroccan and Yemenite Jews
- Population (2024): 485

Mahseya (Hebrew: מַחְסֵיָה) is a moshav in central Israel. Located about two kilometers east of Beit Shemesh, it falls under the jurisdiction of Mateh Yehuda Regional Council in the Jerusalem District. In 2024 it had a population of 485.

== History ==
The village was established in 1950 by Jewish immigrants and refugees from Morocco and from Yemen and Aden, on the land of depopulated Arab village of Dayr Aban. Although it too was later abandoned, it was re-settled by Cochin Jews. Its name is taken from Jeremiah32:12:

And I delivered the deed of the purchase unto Baruch the son of Neriah, the son of Mahseiah, in the presence of Hanamel mine uncle['s son], and in the presence of the witnesses that subscribed the deed of the purchase, before all the Jews that sat in the court of the guard.

During the 1948 Arab–Israeli War, to the south of the current site of the moshav, there was a military outpost for the Egyptian army (within Dayr Aban), known as the 'Joint' Command Post, and which place was taken in armed conflict during Operation Ha-Har.

== Archaeology ==
In 2004 archaeologists uncovered a large stone building, 40 × 80 m, with floors composed of chalk, stone and mosaic. An olive press was built to the west. Pottery vessels and coins date the building to the sixth–eighth centuries CE. From the size and nature of construction, it is believed to have been a monastery.
