= Aviezer =

Aviezer: אביעזר (Hebrew); افيعيزر (Arabic)
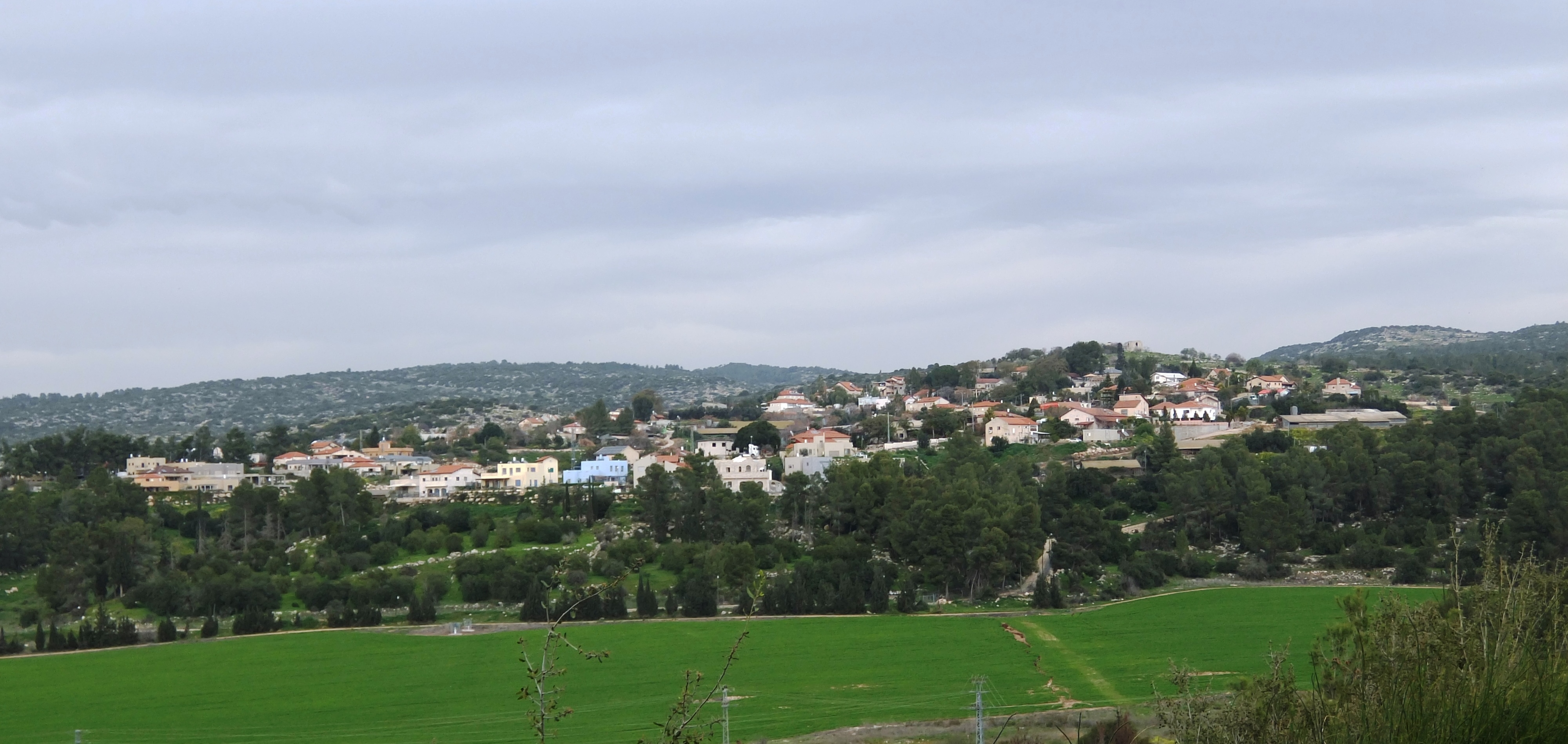
- Aviezer as viewed from the Elah Valley

- Location within Jerusalem District Location within Israel
- Coordinates: 31°40′54″N 35°1′0″E
- Country: Israel
- District: Jerusalem
- Council: Mateh Yehuda
- Affiliation: Hapoel HaMizrachi
- Founded: 8 April 1958
- Founder: Cochin Jews
- Population (2024): 920

Aviezer (Hebrew: אֲבִיעֶזֶר) is a small religious moshav in central Israel. Located seven kilometres south of Beit Shemesh, at the east end of the Elah valley, it falls under the jurisdiction of Mateh Yehuda Regional Council. In 2024 it had a population of 920.

== History ==
The moshav was founded on 8 April 1958 by immigrants from Iran and by Cochin Jews from Kochi, being the chief ethnic constituent, and was initially named Adulam 9. It was later renamed after Aviezer Zigmond Gestetner, a former president of the Jewish National Fund in the United Kingdom. It was established on land that had formerly belonged to the depopulated Palestinian village of Bayt Nattif before the 1948 Arab-Israeli War. Today, the site of Aviezer lies within the "green-line" of the 1949 Armistice Agreements.

== Gallery ==
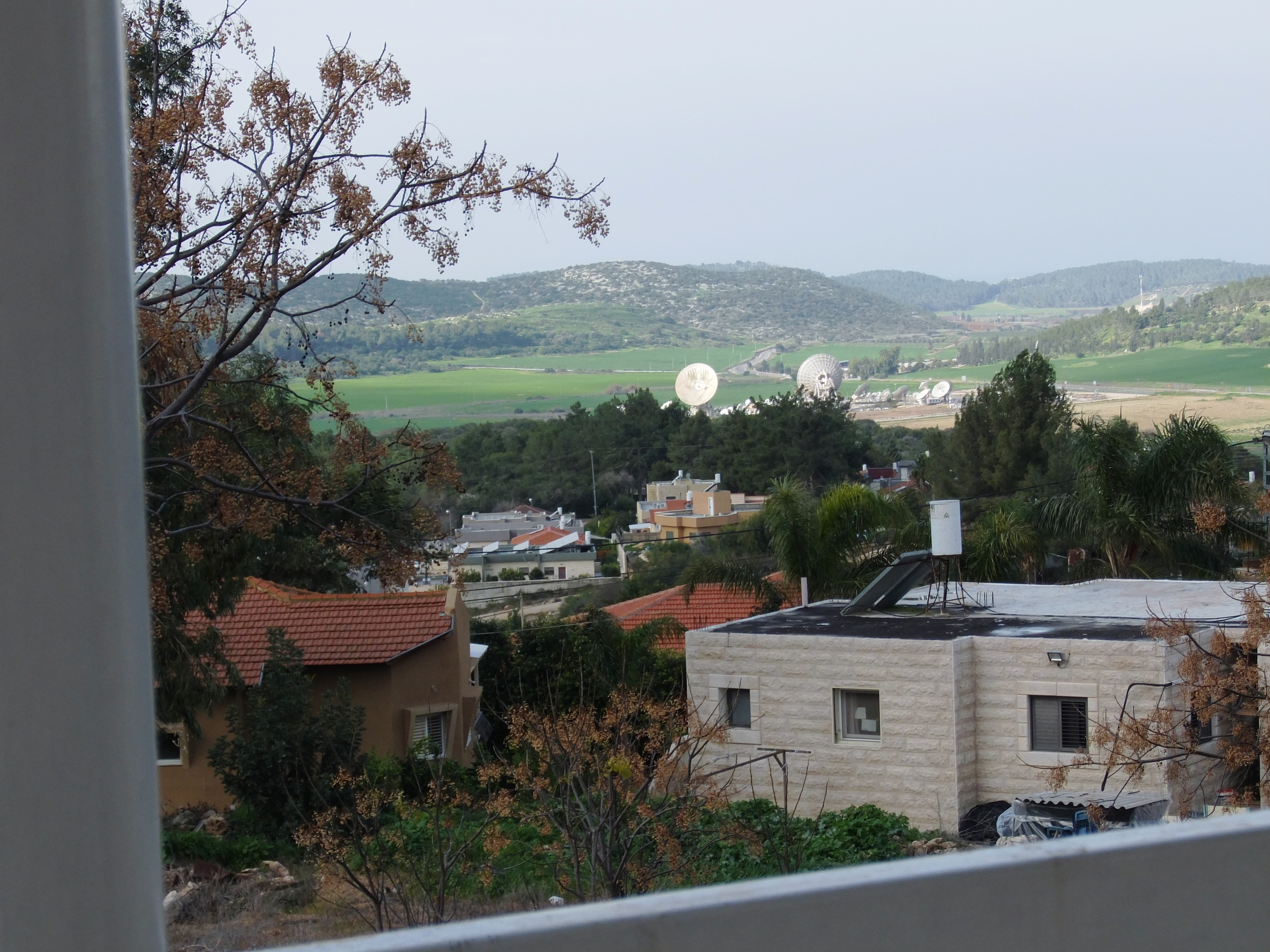
Moshav Aviezer, overlooking the Elah Valley

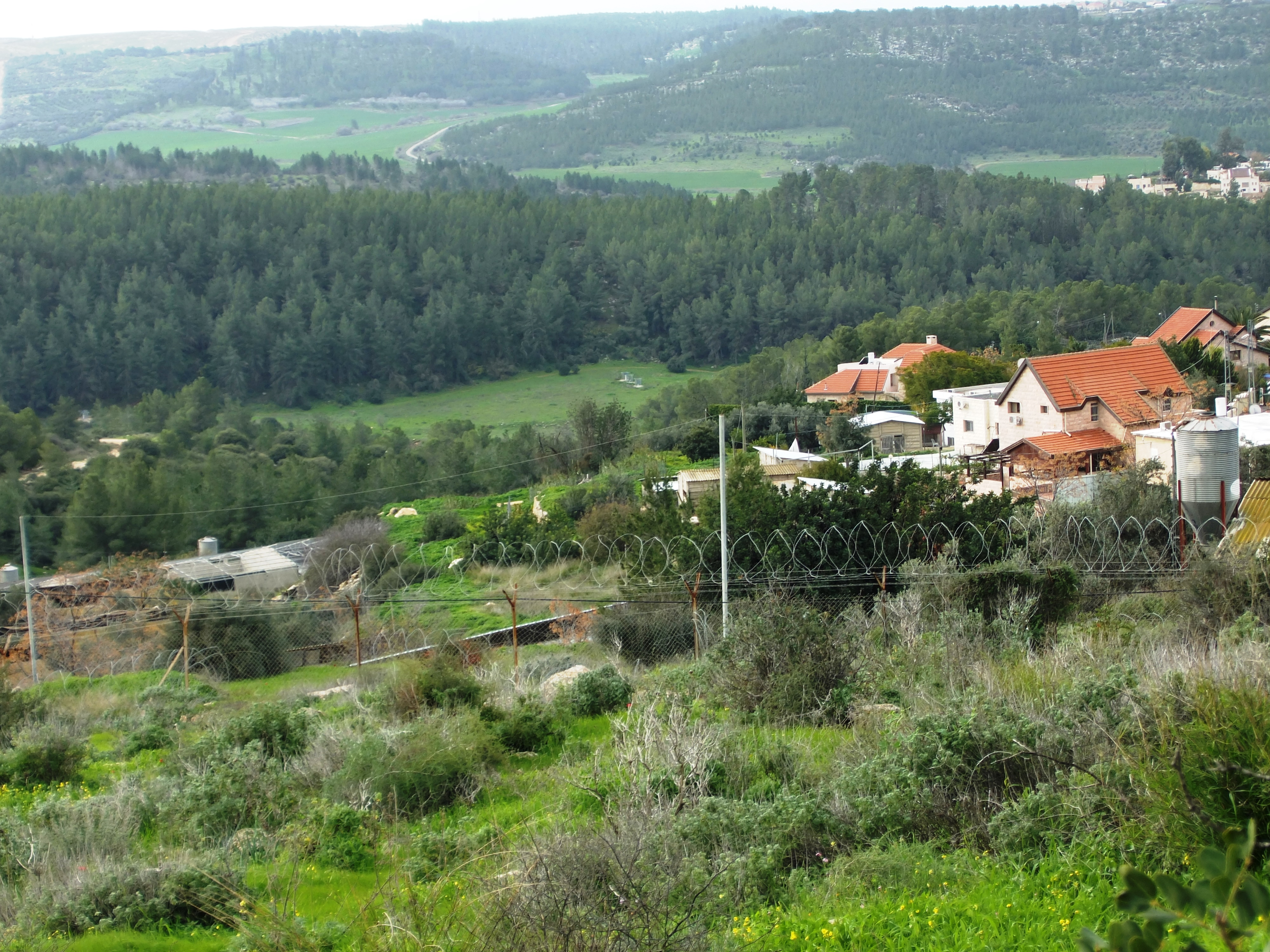
Moshav Aviezer as seen from ruin, Um Ra'us (southern site)

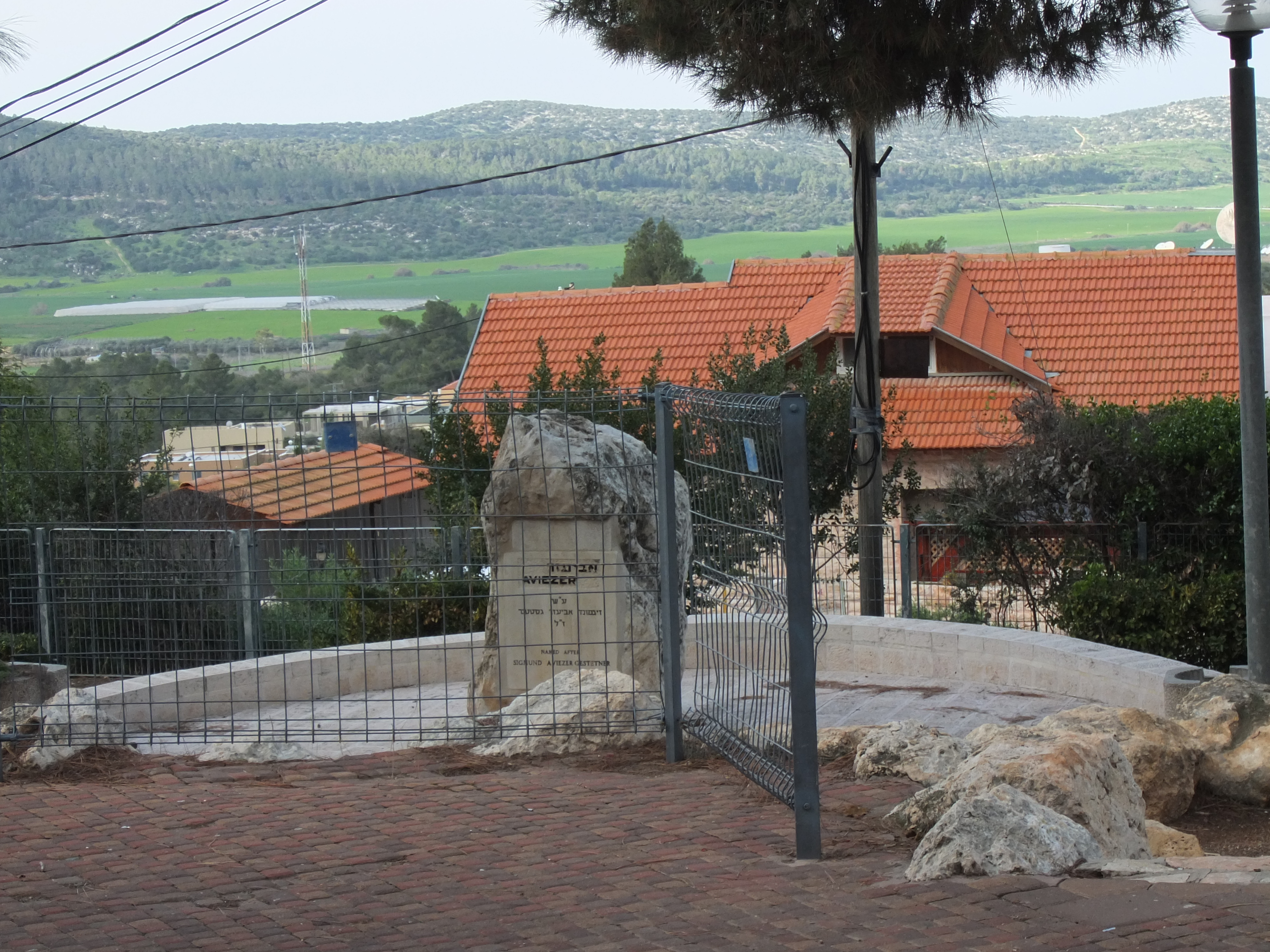
House in Moshav Aviezer

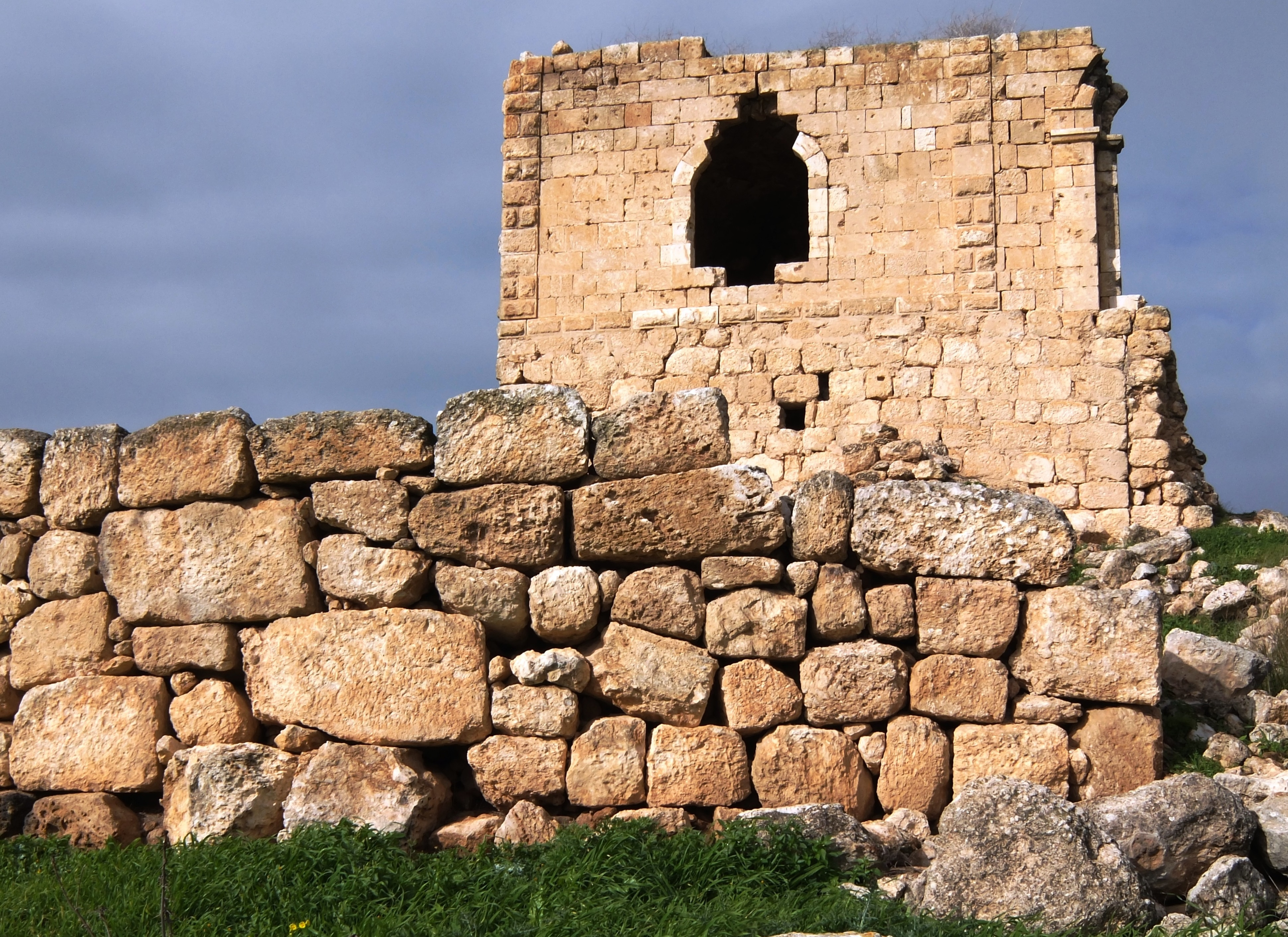
The Ruin of Um Ra'us (southern site), near Moshav Aviezer

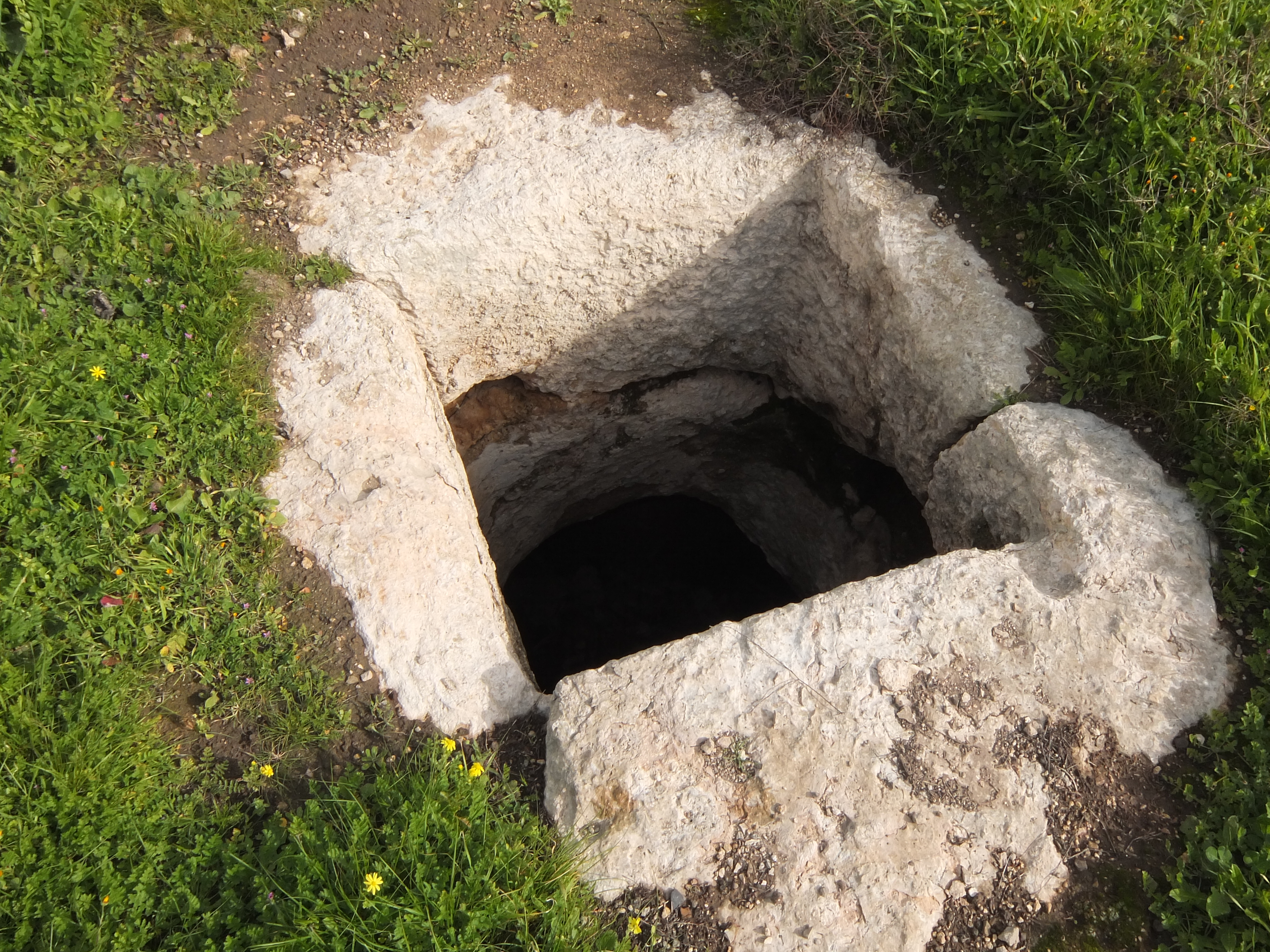
Cistern at the Ruin of Um Ra'us, near Moshav Aviezer

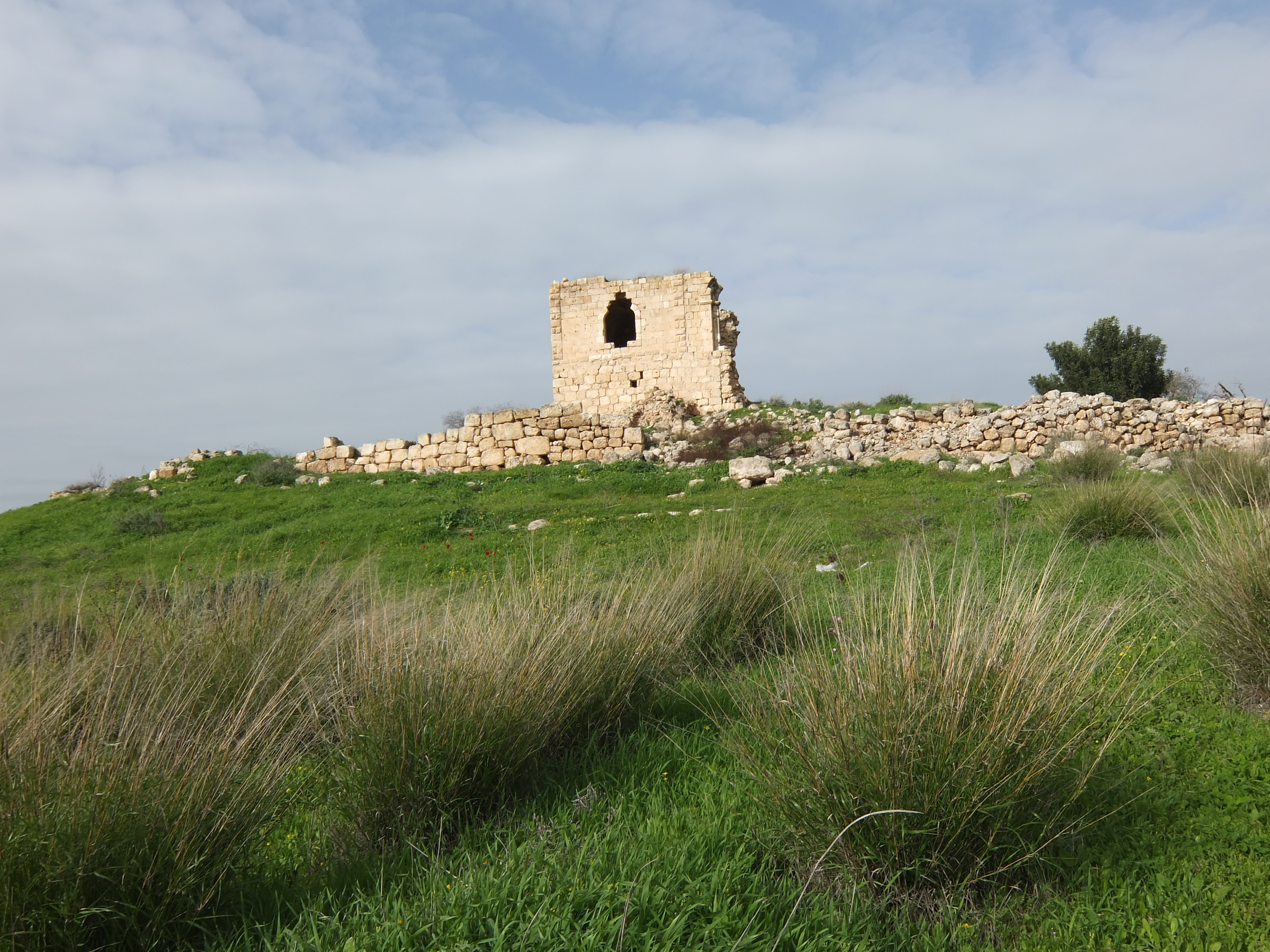
Um Ra'us (southern site), dating back to Hellenistic, Roman and Byzantine times

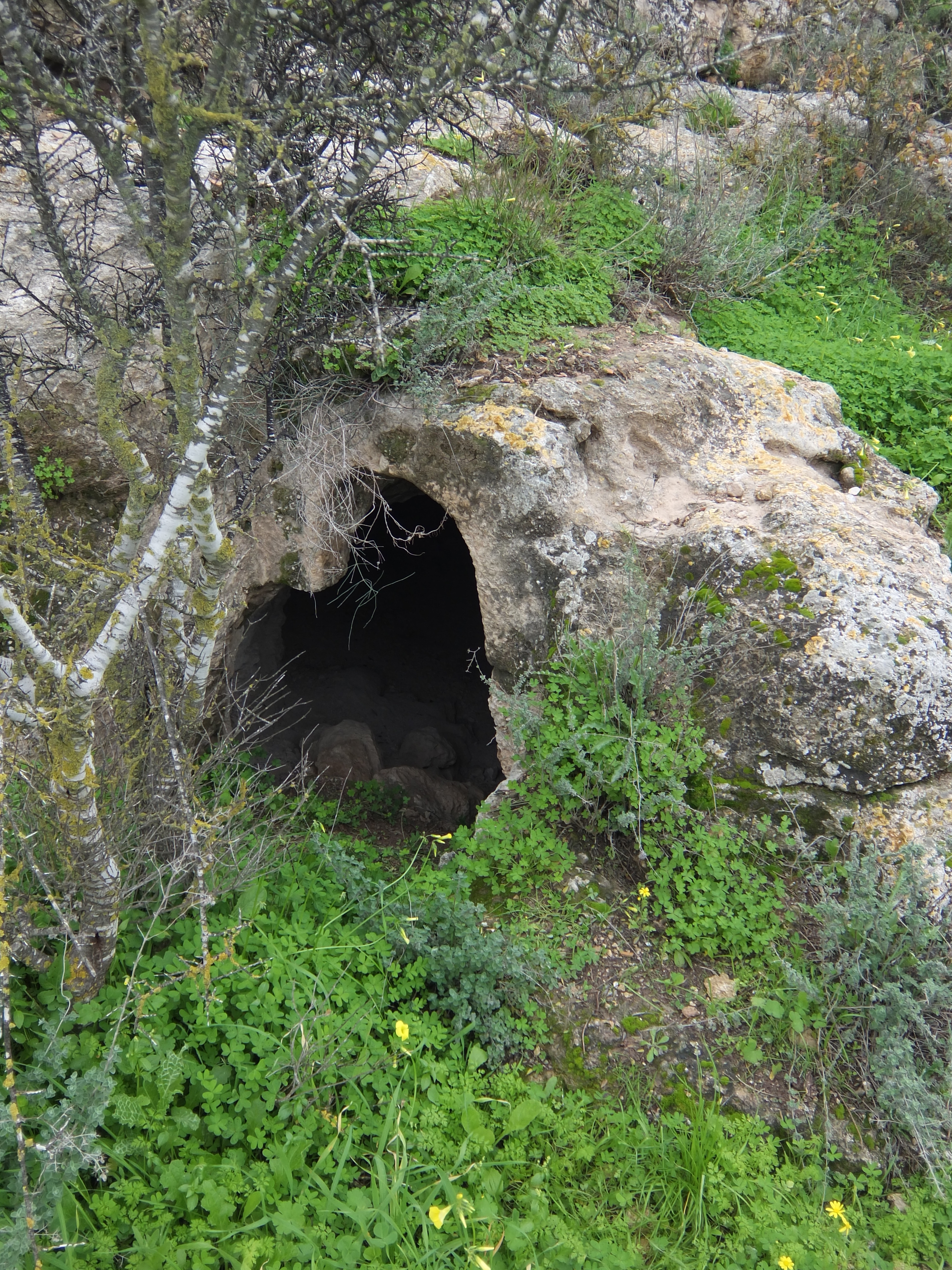
Mouth of hewn sepulchre at Um er-Rus (southern site), near Moshav Aviezer

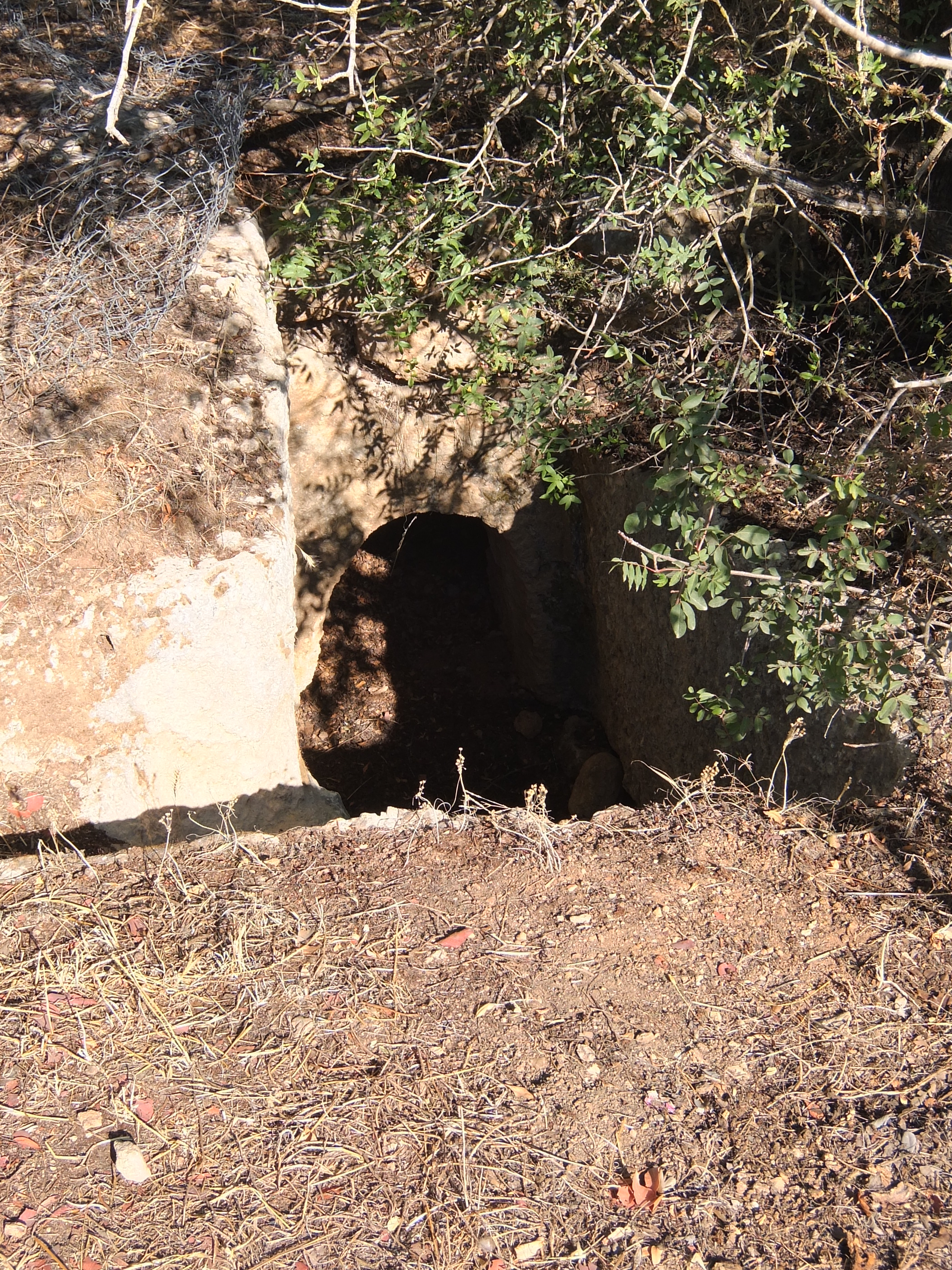
Burial tomb carved from rock in Khirbet Malkat-ha near Aviezer

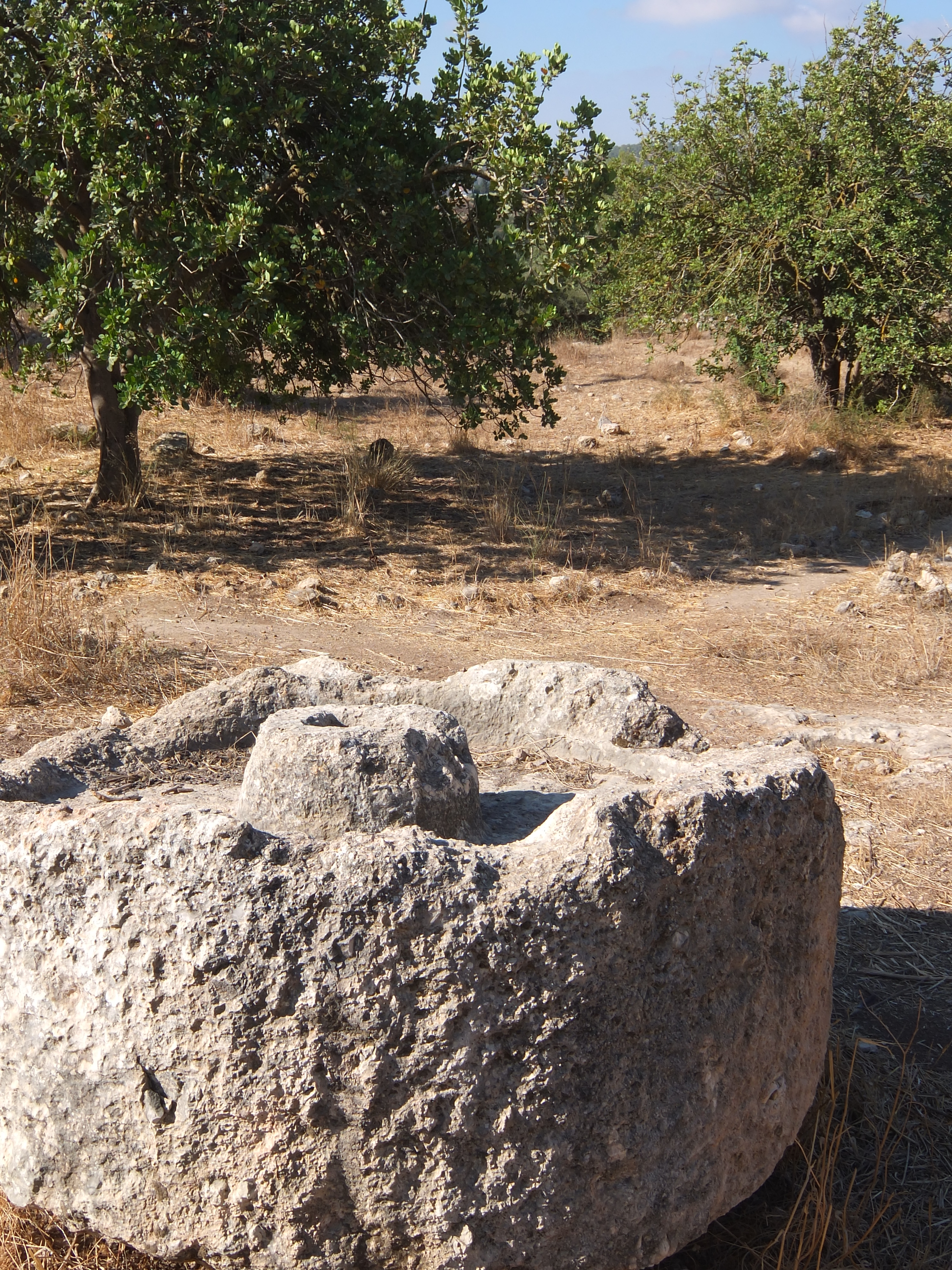
Olive press at Khirbet Malkat-ha

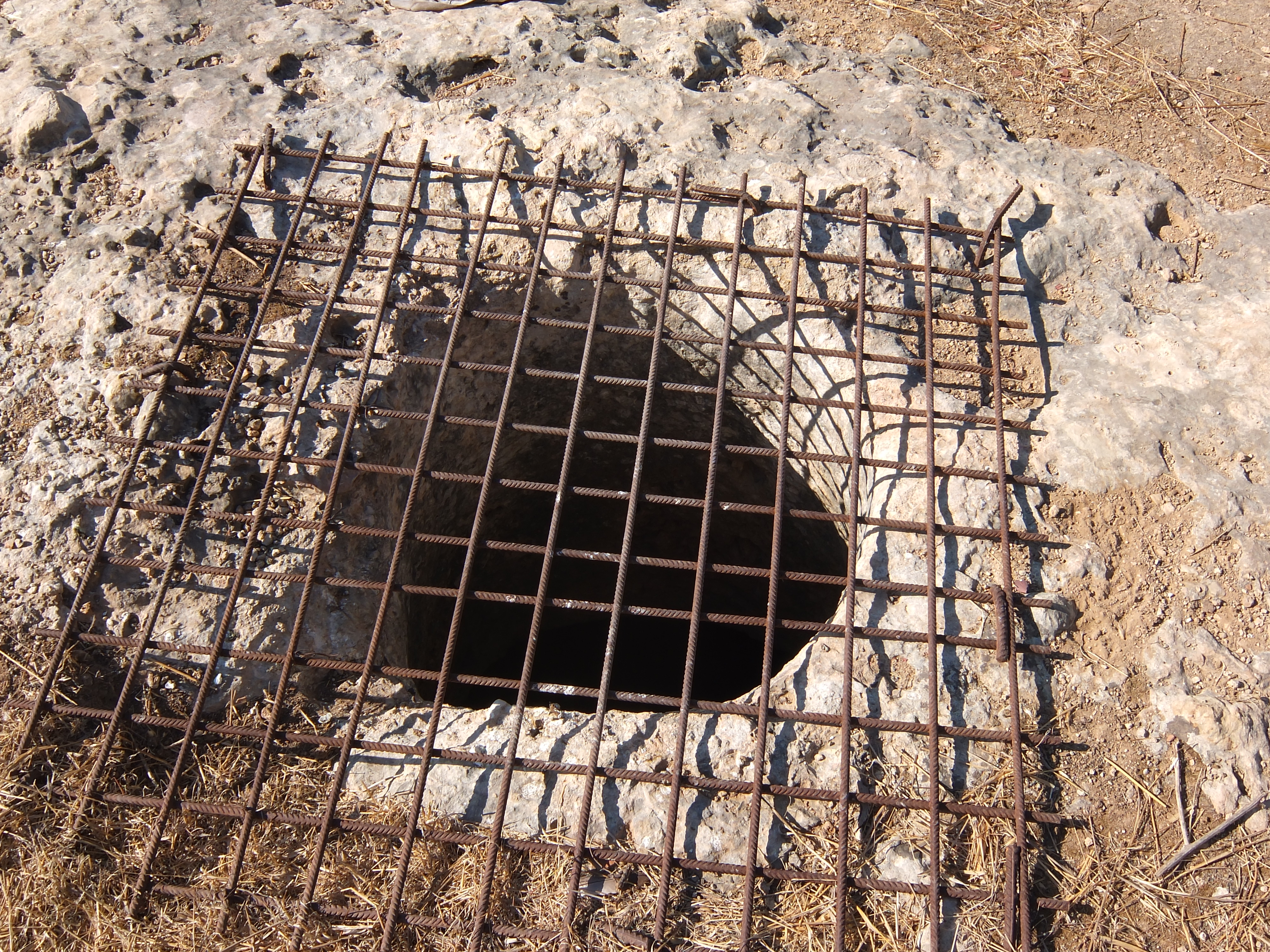
Pit with iron grating

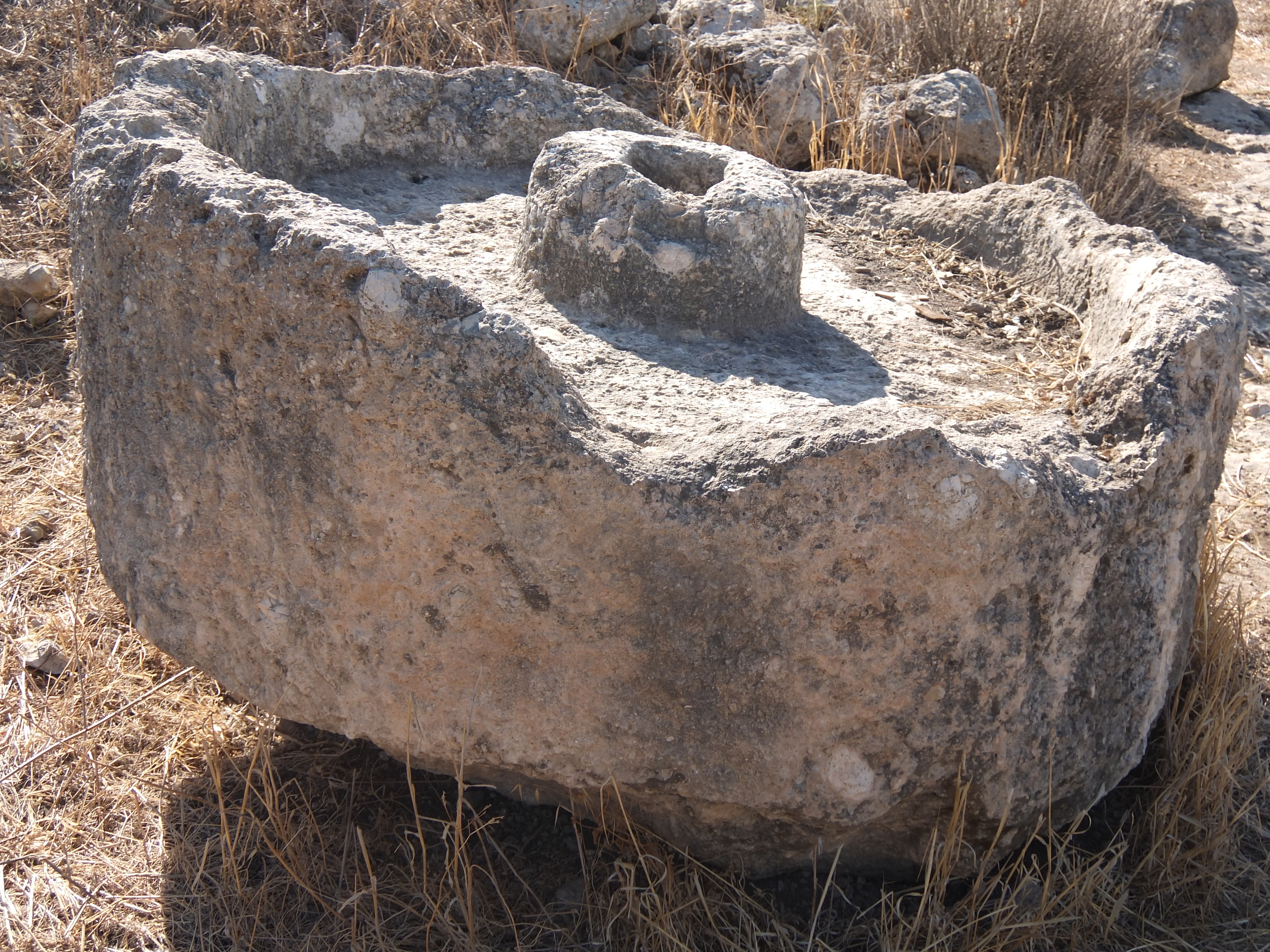
Broken olive press near Aviezer (Khirbet Malkat-ha)

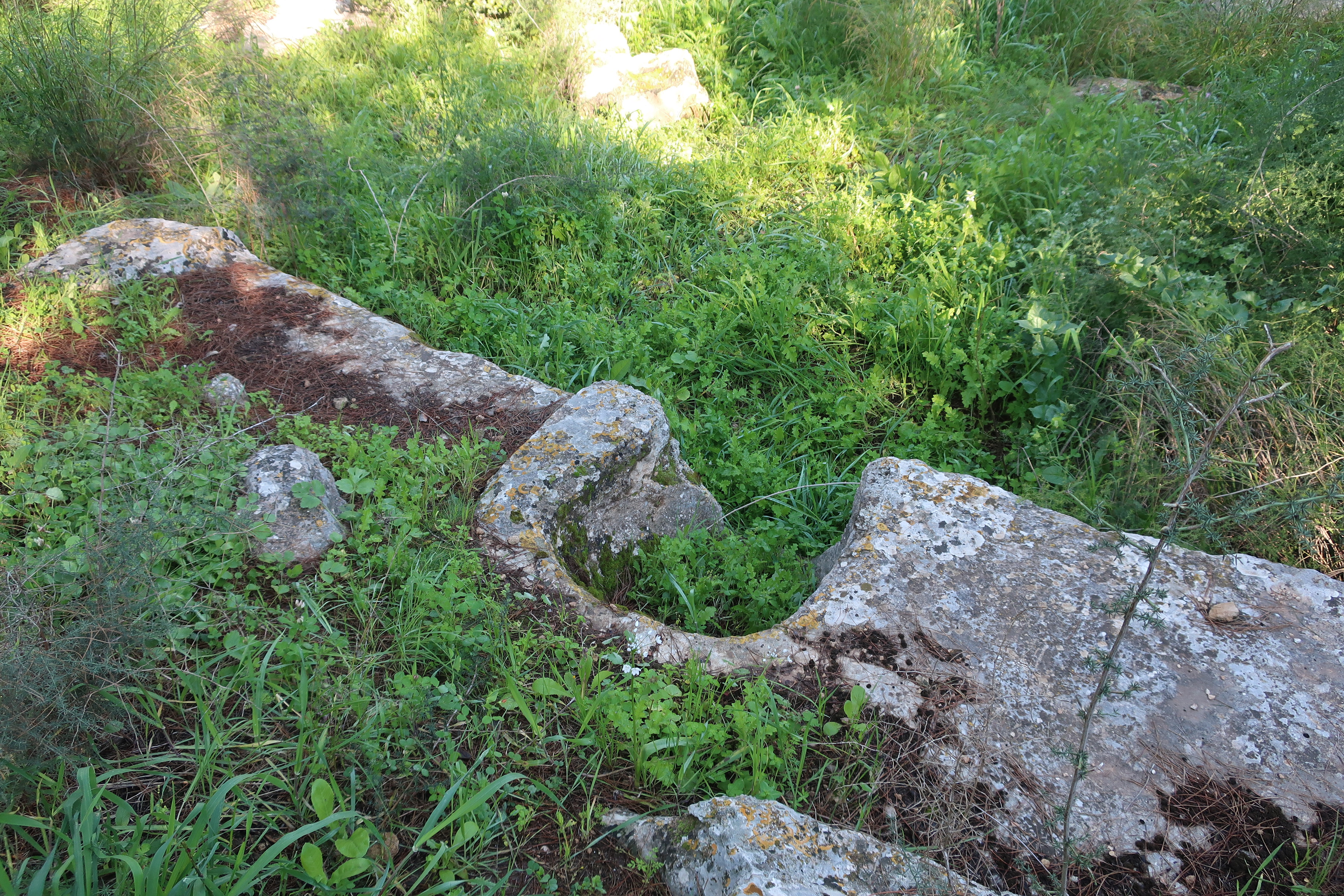
Foundations of old house, found at Kh. Beit-Ika ruin near Aviezer

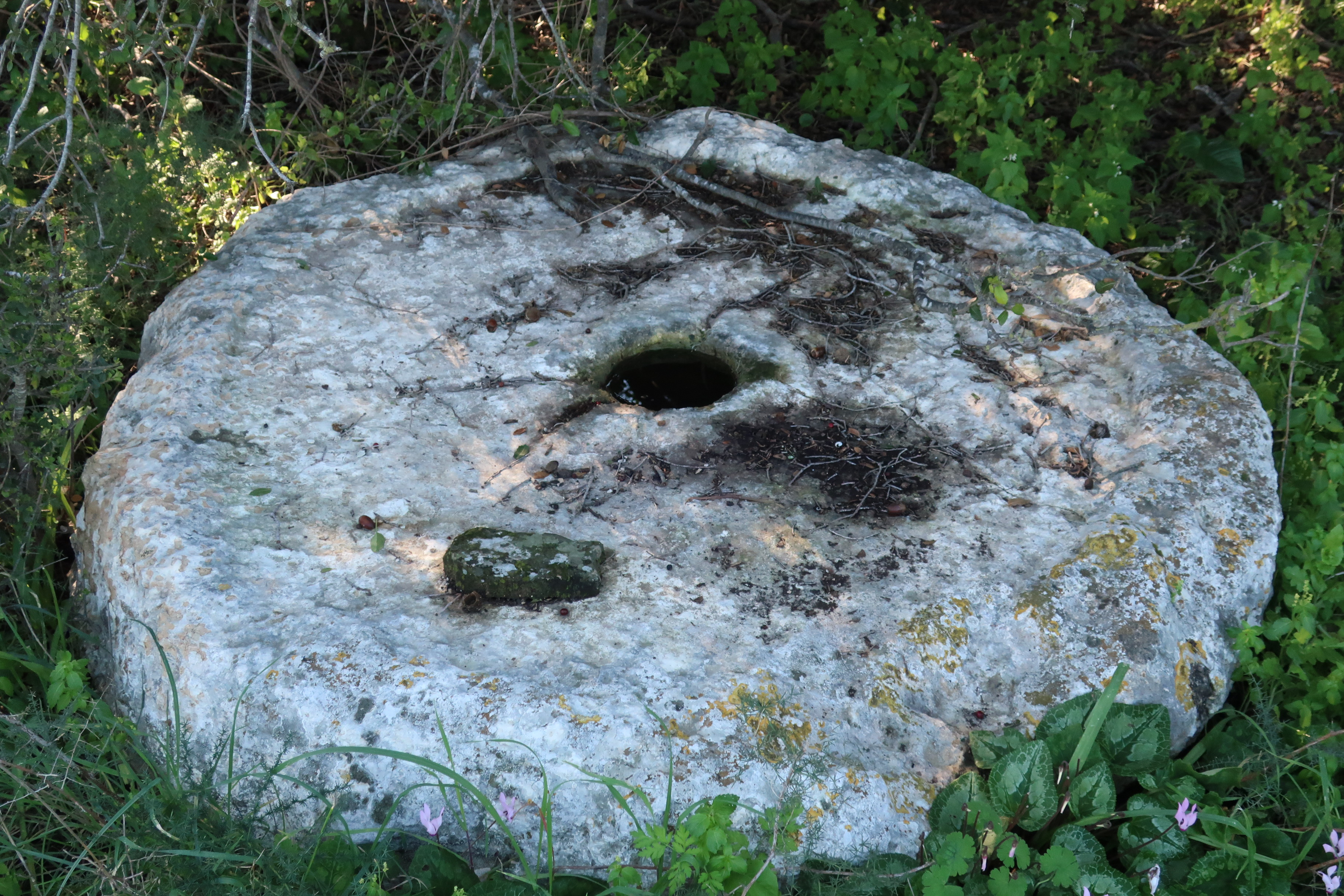
Millstone of Olive Press in Kh. Beit Ika
