= Bayt Nattif =

Depopulated Palestinian town in Israel

Bayt Nattif بيت نتّيف
- Bayt Nattif 1948, after occupation
- Etymology: The house of Nettif
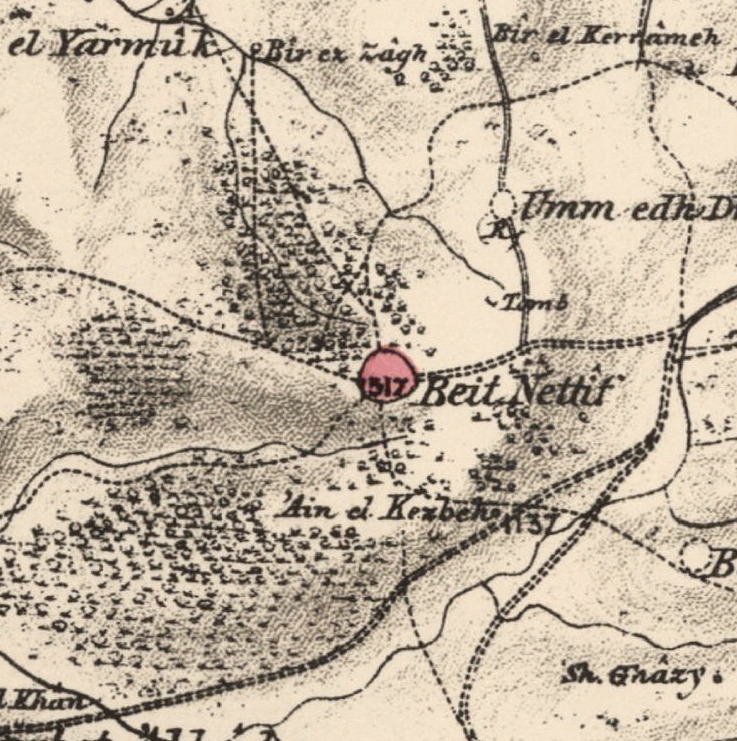
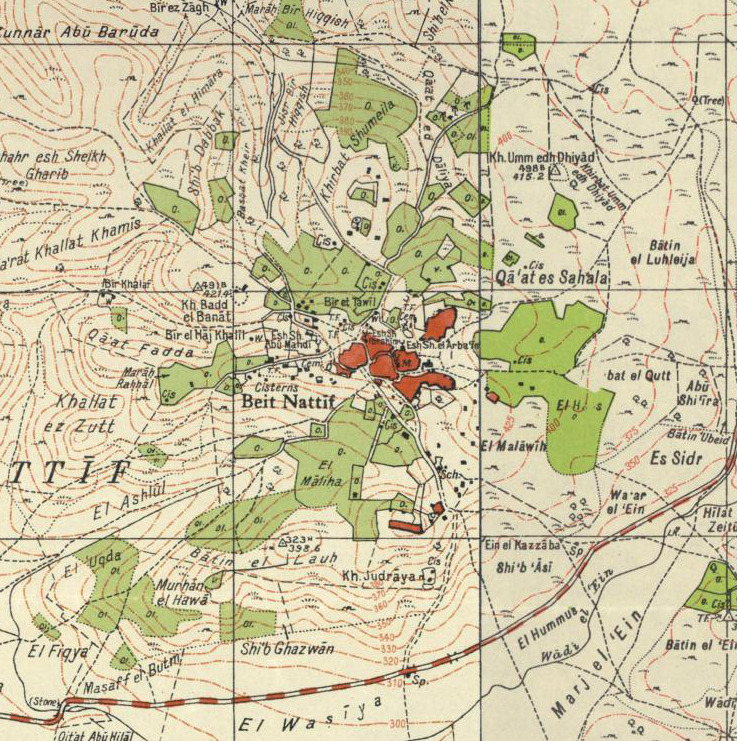
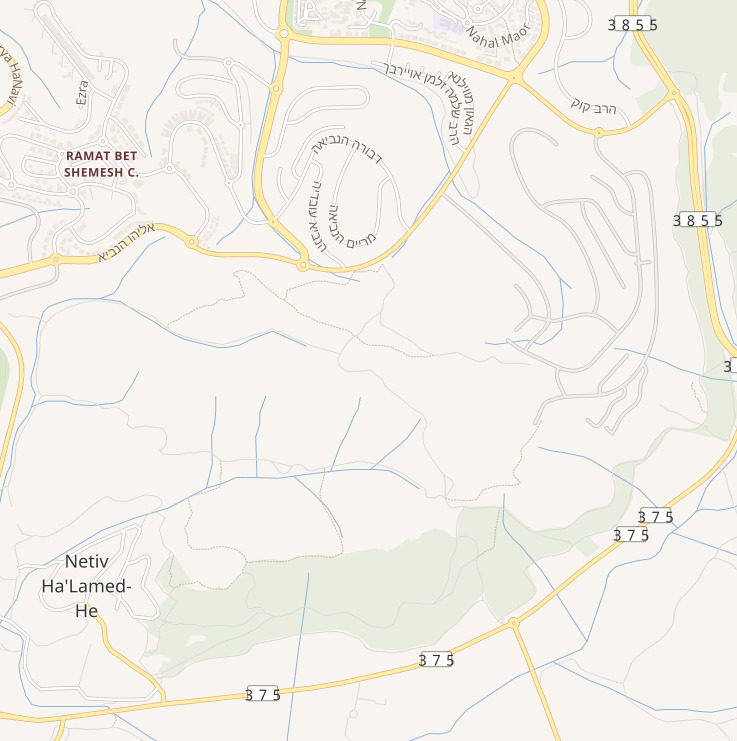
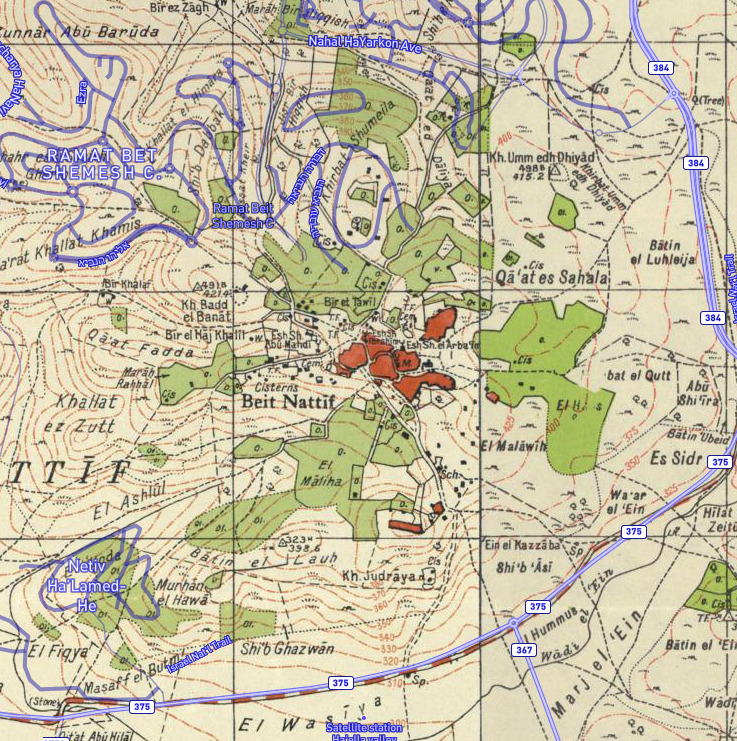
- 1870s map 1940s map modern map 1940s with modern overlay map A series of historical maps of the area around Bayt Nattif (click the buttons)

- Location within Mandatory Palestine
- Coordinates: 31°41′32″N 34°59′40″E
- Palestine grid: 149/122
- Geopolitical entity: Mandatory Palestine
- Subdistrict: Hebron
- Date of depopulation: October 21, 1948

Population (1945)
  - Total: 2,150
- Cause(s) of depopulation: Military assault by Yishuv forces
- Current Localities: Netiv HaLamed-Heh, Aviezer, Neve Michael

Bayt Nattif or Beit Nattif (Arabic: بيت نتّيف, Hebrew: בית נטיף and בית נתיף alternatively) was a Palestinian village, located some 20 kilometers (straight line distance) southwest of Jerusalem, midway on the ancient Roman road between Beit Guvrin and Jerusalem, and 21 km northwest of Hebron. The village was on a hilltop, surrounded by olive groves and almonds, with woodlands of oak and carobs overlooking Wadi es-Sunt (the Elah Valley) to its south. It contained several shrines, including one dedicated to el-Sheykh Ibrahim. Roughly a dozen khirbas (deserted, ruined settlements) lay in the vicinity.

During the British Mandate it was part of the Hebron Subdistrict. Bayt Nattif was depopulated during the 1948 Arab–Israeli War on October 21, 1948 under Operation Ha-Har.

== Name ==
In Roman period the town was known as Bethletepha or Betholetepha, and commonly known by its Greek equivalent, Bethletephon.

According to Muhammad Abu Halawa, the name was originally Bayt Lettif, which was simplified to Bayt Nattif because it was easier to pronounce.

== History ==
=== Early Roman period (63 BCE – 135 CE) ===
Bayt Nattif stood on the much-travelled ancient road connecting Eleutheropolis (Beth Guvrin, later Bayt Jibrin) with Jerusalem, about midway between the two towns.

In the Roman province of Judaea (6–135 CE), the town became the capital of one of the eleven toparchies or prefectures of the province, receiving certain administrative responsibilities, and is known from some classical sources by the name Betholetepha. This region was called Idumea on account of it being inhabited largely by the descendants of Esau (Edom) who were converted to Judaism during the time of John Hyrcanus.

During the first Jewish uprising against Rome (66-73), in the 12th year of the reign of Nero, when the Roman army had suffered a great defeat under Cestius Gallus, with more than five thousand foot soldiers killed, the people of the surrounding countryside feared reprisals from the Roman army and made haste to appoint generals and to fortify their settlements. Generals were at that time appointed for Idumea, namely, over the entire region immediately south and south-west of Jerusalem, and which incorporated within it the towns of Bethletephon, Betaris [sic] (corrected to read Begabris), Kefar Tobah, Adurim, and Maresha. Later in the revolt, in spring 68 CE, the city was destroyed by Vespasian and Titus, as recorded by Josephus.

Based on the writings of Josephus and archaeological discoveries, the town and surrounding region were predominantly Jewish until the Bar-Kokhba revolt of 132–135 CE.

=== Late Roman and Byzantine periods (135 – early 7th century) ===
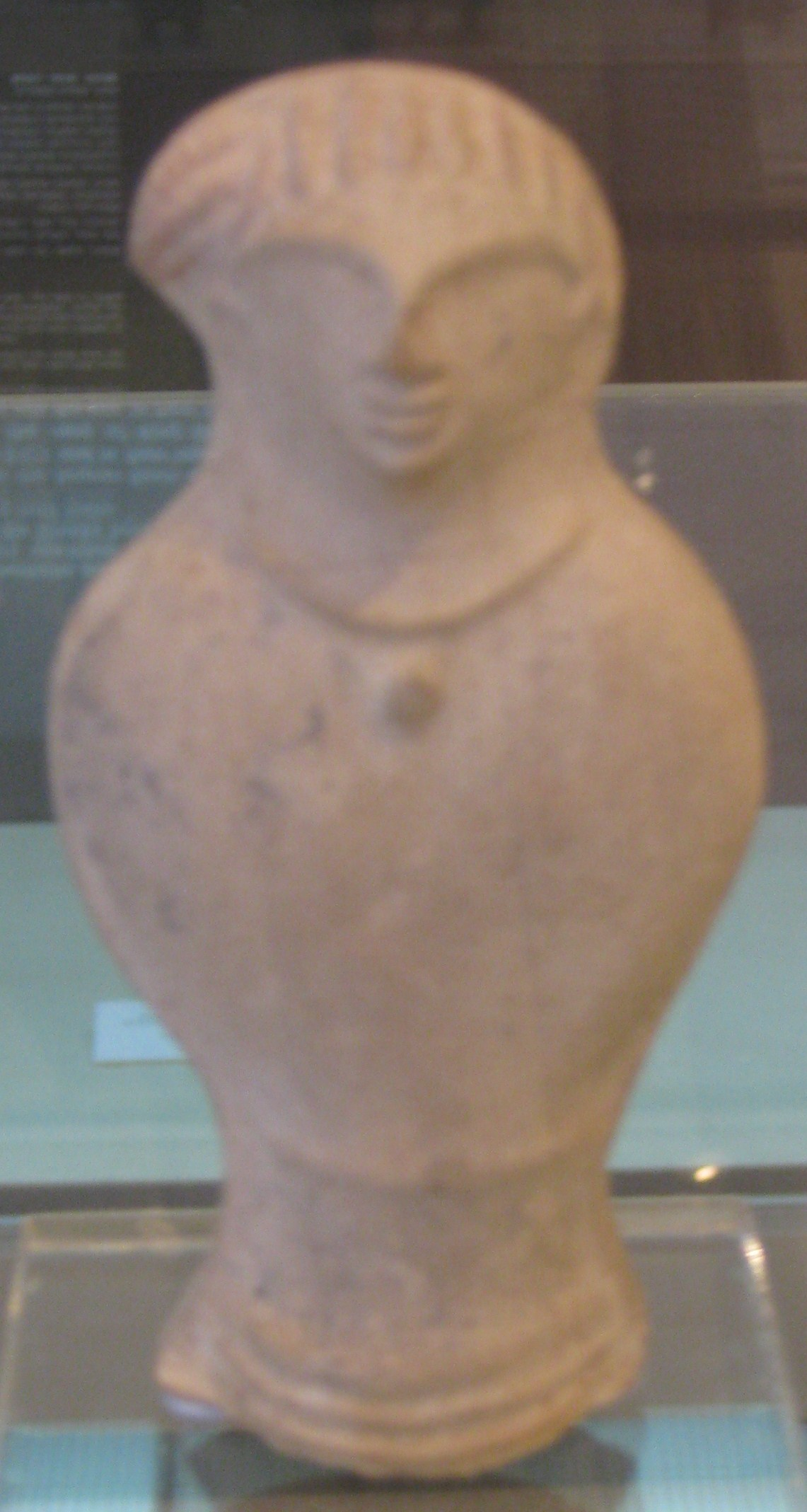
Figurine discovered at Bayt Nattif: boy with medallion, Late Roman period (late 3rd–early 4th century CE), Israeli National Maritime Museum in Haifa

Archaeological findings indicate that after the revolt, during the Late Roman period, the town has been resettled with pagan Roman citizens and army veterans, as part of the Romanisation process of the rural area surrounding Aelia Capitolina and reaching downhill towards Eleutheropolis. At this time the town was still an important site.

A rectangular structure with a decorated floor mosaic was interpreted in 1934 to be the remains of a fifth- or sixth-century Byzantine church.

=== Ottoman period (1517–1917) ===
In 1596, Bayt Nattif was listed among villages belonging to the nahiya Quds, in the administrative district Liwā` of Jerusalem, in a tax ledger of the "countries of Syria" (wilāyat aš-Šām) and which lands were then under Ottoman rule. During that year, Bayt Nattif was inhabited by 94 households and 10 bachelors, all Muslim. The Ottoman authority levied a 33.3% taxation on agricultural products produced by the villagers (primarily on wheat, barley, olives, sesame seeds and grapes, among other fruits), besides a marriage tax and supplement tax on goats and beehives. Total revenues accruing from the village of Bayt Nattif for that year amounted to 12,000 akçe.

In 1838 Edward Robinson visited, and remarks that their party was very well received by the villagers. He further noted that the villagers belonged to the "Keis" faction, and that they were a Muslim village, located in the el-Arkub District, southwest of Jerusalem.

By the mid-19th century, a rift had divided families in the region over control of the district Bani Hasan, until at length it broke out into actual fighting between the Keis (Qays) faction on the one side and the Yaman faction on the other. Meron Benvenisti, writing of this period, says that Sheikh 'Utham al-Lahham waged "a bloody war against Sheikh Mustafa Abu Ghosh, whose capital and fortified seat was in the village of Suba." In 1855, Mohammad Atallah in Bayt Nattif, a cousin of 'Utham al-Lahham, contested his rule over the region. In order to win support from Abu Ghosh, Mohammad Atallah gave his allegiance to the Yaman faction. This is said to have enraged 'Utham al-Lahham. He raised a fighting force and fell on Bayt Nattif on 3 January 1855. The village lost 21 dead. According to an eyewitness description by the horrified British consul, James Finn, their corpses were terribly mutilated.

In the mid-nineteenth century, Beit Naṭṭīf was among several Hebron-area villages—along with Zakariyya, Beit Jibrīn, Ṣurīf, and al-Dawāymeh—whose territories were expanded to include earlier ruin sites. Following the Ottoman land reforms of 1858–1859, these villages received legal title to formerly state-owned (mīrī) lands, marking a phase of agrarian reorganization and renewed cultivation in the Judean Foothills.

In 1863 Victor Guérin visited twice. The first time he visited he estimated that the village contained about one thousand inhabitants. He further noted that the houses were crudely built, one of them, which was assigned to the reception of foreigners, the al-Medhafeh, was a square tower. Above the entrance of the al-Medhafeh was a large block for lintel, featuring elegant mouldings, Guérin assumed it came from an ancient destroyed monument. Many other ancient stones were embedded here and there in private homes. Two wells, several cisterns and a number of silos and stores carved in the rock, and in continued use, were also ancient.

Socin, citing an official Ottoman village list compiled around 1870, noted that Bayt Nattif had 66 houses and a population of 231, though the population count included men only. Hartmann found that Bayt Nattif had 120 houses.

In 1883, the PEF's Survey of Western Palestine described Bayt Nattif as being "a village of fair size, standing high on a flat-topped ridge between two broad valleys. On the south, about 400 feet below, is a spring (`Ain el Kezbeh), and on the north a rock-cut tomb was found. There are fine olive-groves round the place, and the open valleys are very fertile in corn."

Around 1896, the population of Bayt Nattif was estimated to be about 672 persons.

=== British Mandate (1920–1948) ===
For all practical purposes, the British inherited from their Turkish counterparts the existing laws in regard to land tenures as defined in the Ottoman Land Code, to which laws there was later added subsidiary legislation. At the time of the British occupation the land tax was collected at the rate of 12.5% of the gross yield of the land. Crops were assessed on the threshing floor or in the field and the tithe was collected from the cultivators. In 1925, additional legislation provided that taxation on crops and other produce not exceed 10%. In 1928, as a measure of reform, the Mandate Government of Palestine began to apply an Ordinance for the "Commutation of Tithes," this tax in effect being a fixed aggregate amount paid annually. It was related to the average amount of tithe (tax) that had been paid by the village during the four years immediately preceding the application of the Ordinance to it.

In the 1922 census of Palestine conducted by the British Mandate authorities, Bayt Nattif had a population of 1,112, all Muslims, increasing in the 1931 census to 1,649, still all Muslim, in a total of 329 houses (which figure includes houses built in the nearby ruin, Khirbet Umm al-Ra’us).

In 1927, Yitzhak Ben-Zvi reported local traditions indicating that families of Jewish descent resided in Bayt Nattif. Locals said they converted to Islam around five hundred years earlier.

In 1926, some 259 dunums (61.77 acres) of land near Beit Nattif were designated as "Jabal es-Sira Forest Reserve no. 73," held by the State.

By the 1945 statistics, the population had increased to 2,150 Muslims. In 1944/45, a total of 20,149 dunums were allocated to cereal grains in the adjacent lowlands; 688 dunums were irrigated or used for orchards, while 162 dunams were built-up (urban) areas.

=== 1948 war and depopulation ===
In the proposed 1947 UN Partition Plan, it was designated as part of the Arab state.

As hostilities broke out in the wake of the publication of the plan, Yohanan Reiner and Fritz Eisenstadt, military advisors of David Ben-Gurion proposed, on December 18, 1947, that any Arab attack be met with a decisive blow, consisting of the "destruction of the place or chasing out the inhabitants and taking their place." Such proposals were mulled and shelved - one participant likening such proposals to the destruction of Lidice - but in January 1948, a Jerusalem District HQ document entitled "Lines of Planning for Area Campaigns for the Month of February 1948," foresaw taking steps to secure the Jerusalem-Tel Aviv route. In this document one measure consisted of "the destruction of villages or objects dominating our settlements or threatening our lines of transportation," and among the objectives of the plan the destruction of the southern bloc of Beit Nattif was envisaged.

The official Jewish account (The "History of Haganah") alleges that the village of Bayt Nattif took part in the killing of thirty-five Jewish fighters (see the Convoy of 35, the "Lamed-Heh") who were en route with supplies to the besieged block of kibbutzim of Gush Etzion, on January 16, 1948. However, reports from The New York Times correspondent indicate that the convoy took a wrong turn, and ended up in Surif. The Arab version is that the convoy had attacked Surif deliberately, and had held it for an hour before being driven out. After this, the Haganah mounted a "punitive" attack on Bayt Nattif, Dayr Aban and Az-Zakariyya. In late January 1948, the Haganah's Jerusalem HQ ordered "the destruction of the southern block of Bayt Nattif" in order to secure transportation along the Tel-Aviv-Jerusalem highway.

The Israeli Air Force bombed the area of Bayt Nattif on October 19, 1948, which started panic flights from Bayt Nattif and Bayt Jibrin. Bayt Nattif was depopulated during the 1948 Arab-Israeli War on October 21, 1948 under Operation Ha-Har, by the Fourth Battalion of the Har'el Brigade. There are conflicting reports about its conquest, one Palmach report says that the villagers "fled for their lives", while a Haganah report says that the village was occupied "after some light resistance."

During late 1948, the IDF continued to destroy conquered Arab villages, in order to block the villagers return. Among these destroyed villages was Bayt Nattif which, based on Jewish sources, was completely destroyed as a punitive measure for the village's involvement in the detection and massacre of the Convoy of the thirty-five. There are also conflicting reports about which other villages were destroyed with it; one report says that Dayr Aban was destroyed with it, while another report says that Dayr al-Hawa was destroyed with it.

On 5 November, the Harel Brigade raided the area south of Bayt Nattif, driving out any Palestinian refugee they could find.

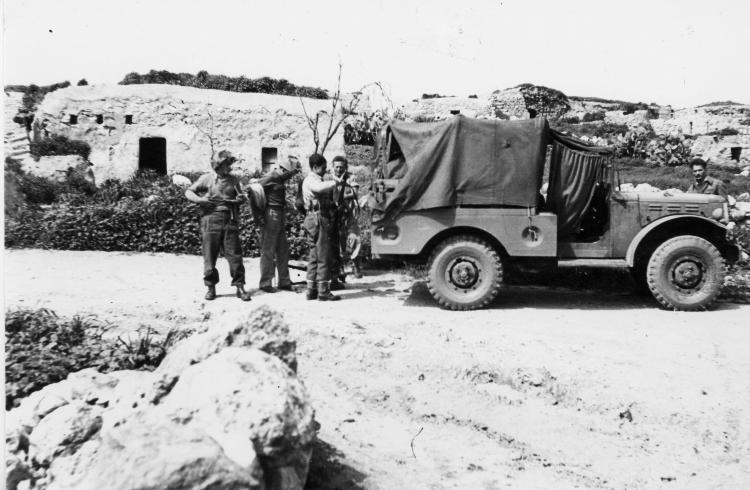
Harel Brigade clearing Bayt Nattif. 1948

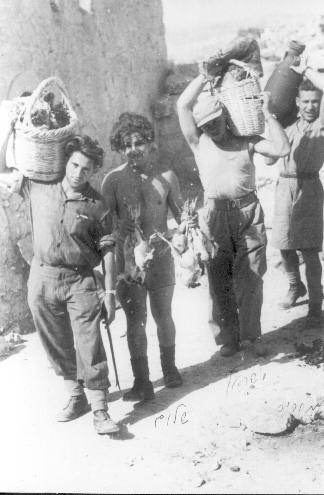
5th Battalion, Harel Brigade in Bayt Nattif, 1948

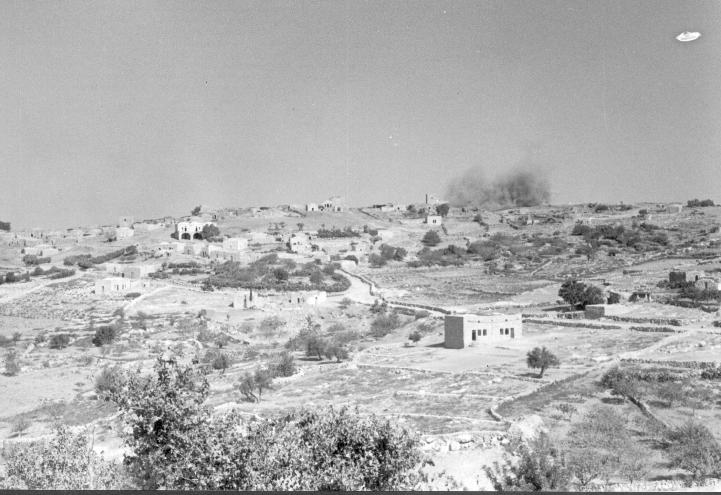
Houses being demolished by the Harel Brigade, Bayt Nattif, 1948

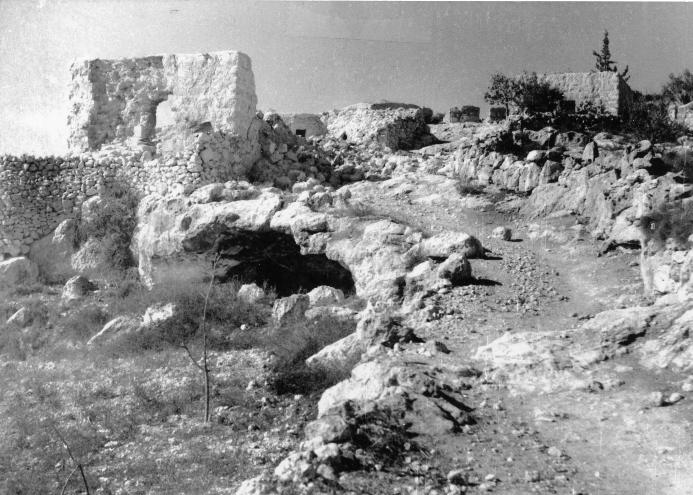
Bayt Nattif during demolition by the Harel Brigade, 1948

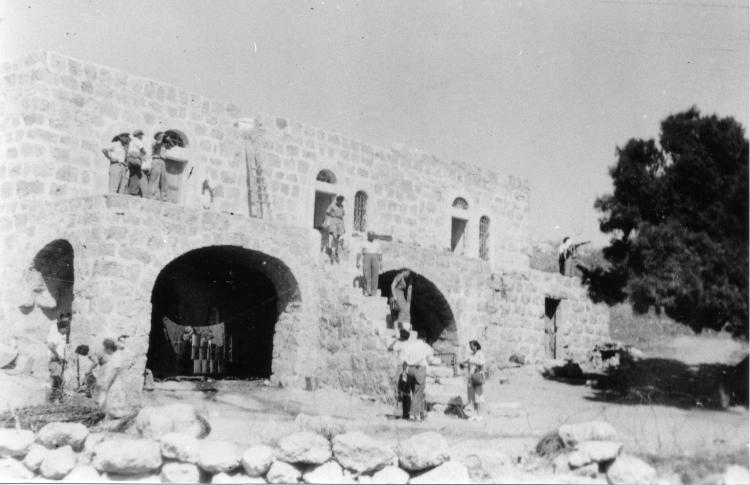
Members of the Yiftach Brigade in Bayt Nattif, 1948

=== Israel (since 1948) ===
Netiv HaLamed-Heh was built on village land in 1949, while Aviezer and Neve Michael were built on village land in 1958. After the Arab-Israeli War of 1948, the ruin of Bayt Nattif remained under Israeli control under the terms of the 1949 Armistice Agreement between Israel and Jordan, until such time that the agreement was dissolved in 1967.

Today, the land that once was the site of Bayt Nattif comprises what is now called The Forest of the Thirty-Five (Hebrew: יַעֲר הַל"ה, romanized: Ya'ar HaLamed He) and is maintained by the Jewish National Fund. Erik Ader, former Dutch ambassador to Norway, whose father Bastiaan Jan Ader is memorialized in the forest as one of the Righteous Among the Nations for saving 200 Jews from the Holocaust, has asked that his father's name be removed as a protest against what Ader called "the ethnic cleansing" of Palestinians. In response, the Jewish National Fund expressed its respect for the actions of Ader’s parents, stating that the monument was legally constructed on state-owned lands.

== Archaeological exploration ==
Archaeological finds from Bayt Nattif can be grouped into three periods: late Second Temple period cisterns and Jewish burials, some possibly from the late first century BCE, but mainly from the first century CE; Late Roman pagan burials with Greek inscriptions and grave goods; and remains of what the 1933 excavator, D. C. Baramki, suggested might have been a fifth- or sixth-century Byzantine church.

In 2013, archaeological survey-excavations of Bayt Nattif were conducted by Yitzhak Paz and Elena Kogan-Zahavi on behalf of the Israel Antiquities Authority (IAA), and by Boaz Gross on behalf of Tel-Aviv University's Institute of Archaeology. In 2014, eight separate surveys were conducted on the site.

=== Burials ===
In 1903 a rock-cut tomb was found about 200 meters east of Bayt Nattif. A search of the interior revealed "a total of 36 kokhim" hewn in two storeys on three walls of the main burial chamber, a room measuring 4 x 5 meters. "On the wall opposite the entrance, an arcosolium and two columns adorned the upper storey" (Zissu - Klein 211f). A limestone sarcophagus was placed in the arcosolium which bore the remains of a Roman soldier with the rank of decurio, dated not before the second quarter of the 2nd-century CE, and probably from the third century, a date suggested by elements of decoration and design.

Another burial chamber was discovered and excavated in 1942–43, showing three phases of use: at first a cistern was hewn out of the bedrock. Sometime around the beginning of the first millennium, it was converted into a burial chamber and used by the Jewish inhabitants of the town, who carved twelve kokhim and three arcosolia into the walls of the former cistern. Later, during the third–fourth centuries, in the Late Roman period, the chamber was again used for burial, this time by the new, pagan Roman inhabitants of the town.

=== Beit Nattif lamps ===
The "Beit Nattif lamp" is a type of ceramic oil lamp that was first discovered as a result of the excavation of two cisterns in 1934. Based on the discovery of unused oil lamps and stone-made casting moulds, it is believed that during the late Roman and Byzantine periods the village manufactured pottery, possibly selling its wares in Jerusalem and Eleutheropolis.

Two first century CE cisterns first discovered in 1917 and excavated by Baramki in 1934 were found to contain a variety of ceramic objects such as oil lamps stone-made lamp moulds, along with and figurines and other artefacts, together interpreted as refuse from a nearby potter's workshop that had been dumped into the cisterns during the third century. During a 2014 dig at Khirbet Shumeila, 1 km northwest of Beit Nattif, a workshop housed in a large Roman villa was excavated, with over 600 lamp fragments of the "Beit Nattif" type and fifteen stone-made lamp molds all found in situ and dated to the 4th century.

The discoveries gave rise to a discussion concerning the ethno-religious identity of the potters and, even more interesting, of the customers to which the oil lamps and figurines were sold. The 1934 findings from the two cisterns included 341 figurines, the main types depicting either nude females or horsemen, possibly used for apotropaic or magical purposes. These more common motives, as well as some less frequent ones such as animals, mirror-plaques and masks, seem to suggests a pagan clientele, while the use of the menorah on lamps suggests the presence of a Jewish population in the region. Less than 1% of the 600 lamps found in 2014 were decorated with a menorah, widely weakening, along with other considerations, the case for a Jewish identity of the Beit Nattif potters. Due to the still very meager Late Roman findings from the region, researchers can neither reject nor prove if and which figurines and lamps were produced specifically for pagans or Jews, Lichtenberger concluding that after the Bar-Kokhba revolt, the remaining Jewish population was integrated into a "milieu of cultural pluralism". Rosenthal-Heginbottom agrees with Jodi Magness that some Beit Nattif lamps were manufactured for Jewish customers, while others were produced with pagan and Christian buyers in mind. There is a certain similarity between the iconography of the Iron Age and the Hellenistic periods and that of the Late Roman period, occurring in time among different ethnoreligious populations, although links may be speculative.

In December 2024, coinciding with a reveal for Hanukkah, a Beit Nattif oil lamp dated to the 3rd or 4th century was discovered near the Mount of Olives bearing iconography of a temple menorah, a lulav, and an incense shovel identified with Second Temple Judaism.

=== Roman milestone ===
A Roman milestone dated 162 CE was discovered 3/4 km southeast of Bayt Nattif showing the distance from Jerusalem and bearing the following Latin and Greek inscription:

Imp(erator) Caesar M(arcus) Aurelius Antoninus Aug(ustus) pont(ifex) max(imus) trib(uniciae) potest(atis) XVI co(n)s(ul) III et Imp(erator) Caesar L(ucius) Aurelius Uerus trib(uniciae) potest(atis) II co(n)s(ul) II [diui Anton]ini fili diui Ha[driani nepotes] diui Traia[ni Par]thici [pronepotes] diui [Neru]ae abnepotes [ἀπὸ Κ]ολ(ωνίας) Αἰλ(ίας) μέχρι ὧδε μίλι(α) ΙΗ.

=== Byzantine church ===
A mosaic pavement, probably belonging to a church, has been excavated at Bayt Nattif. The type of mosaic found are usually dated to the 5th and 6th century CE.

=== Early Muslim period (7th–11th century CE) ===
The location of the cisterns excavated by Baramki in 1934 was lost to the next generations, only to be rediscovered in 2020, hidden under the remains of an ornate Early Muslim period building that collapsed in one of a series of 11th-century earthquakes, possibly in 1033.

== Gallery ==
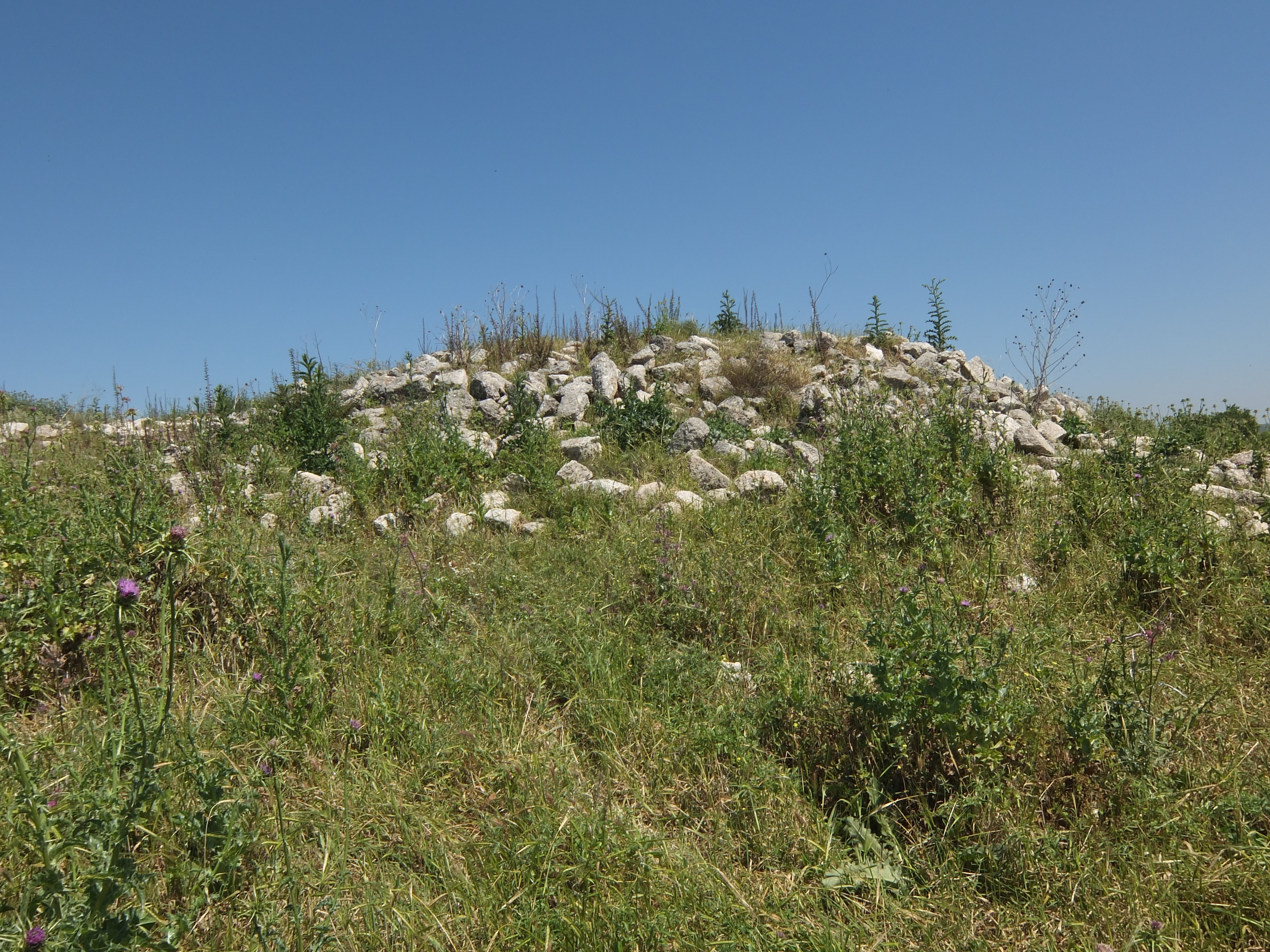
Razed structure at Bayt Nattif

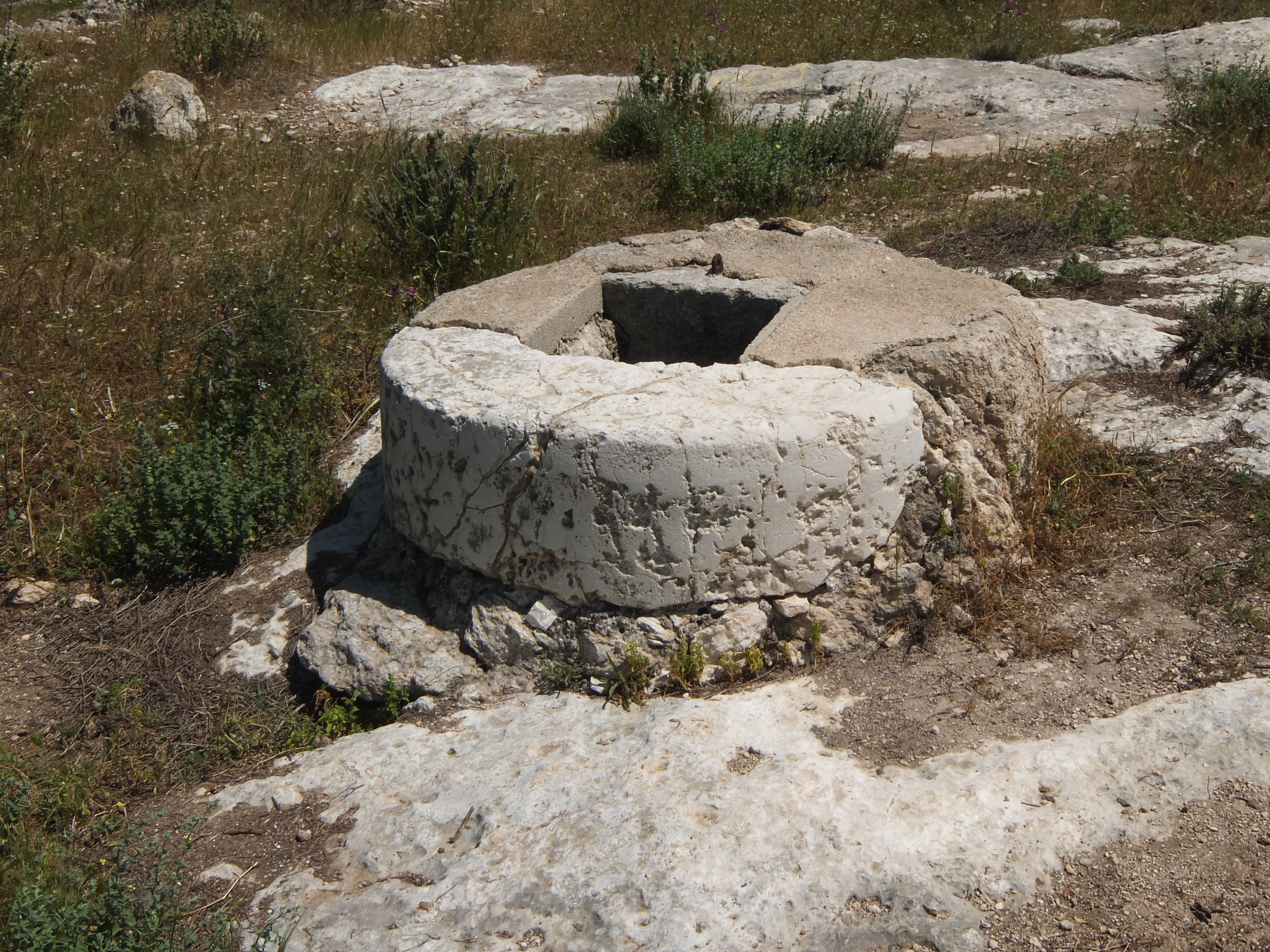
Mouth of cistern near Bayt Nattif

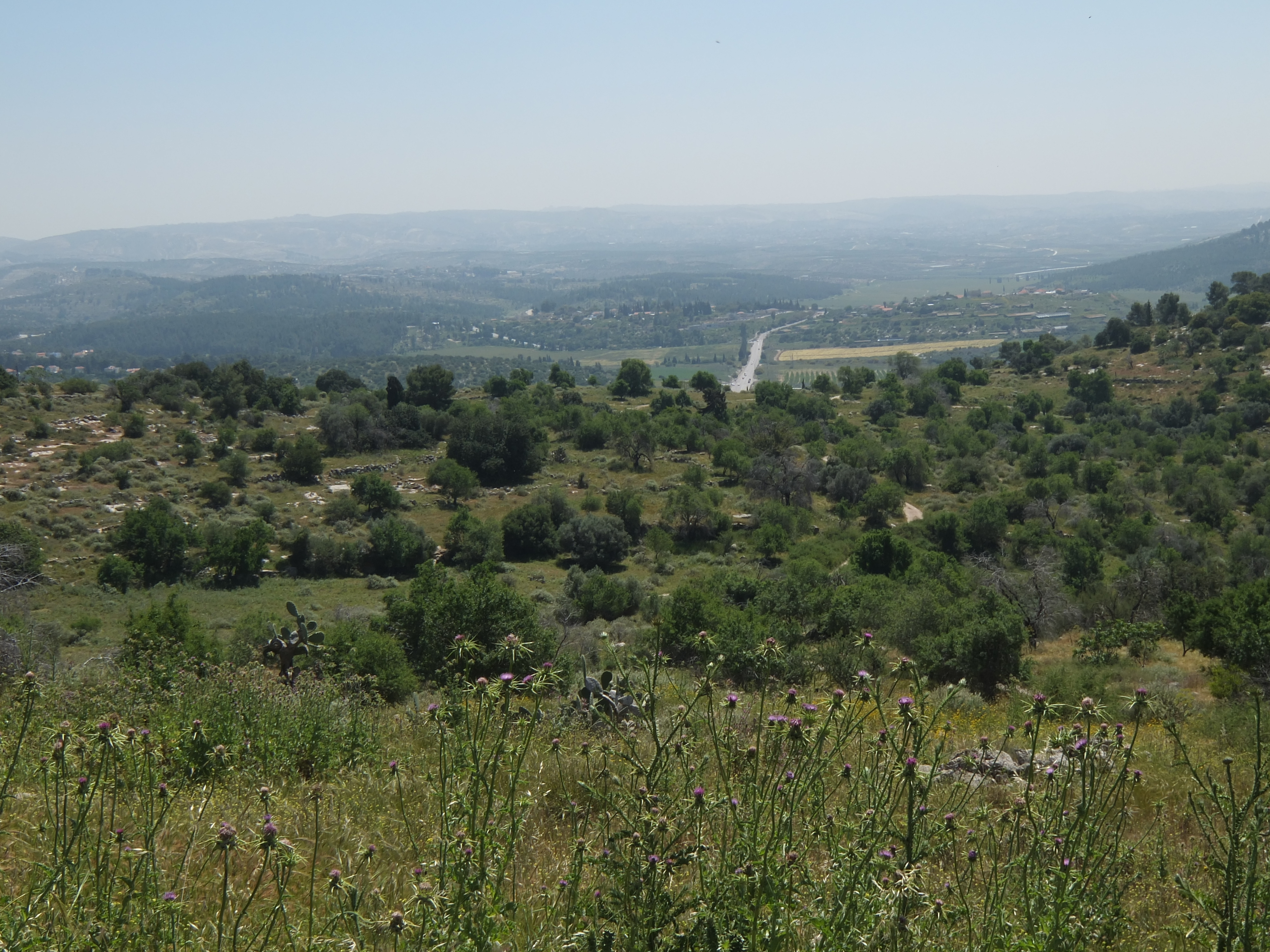
General view of Bayt Nattif, looking south toward the Elah Valley

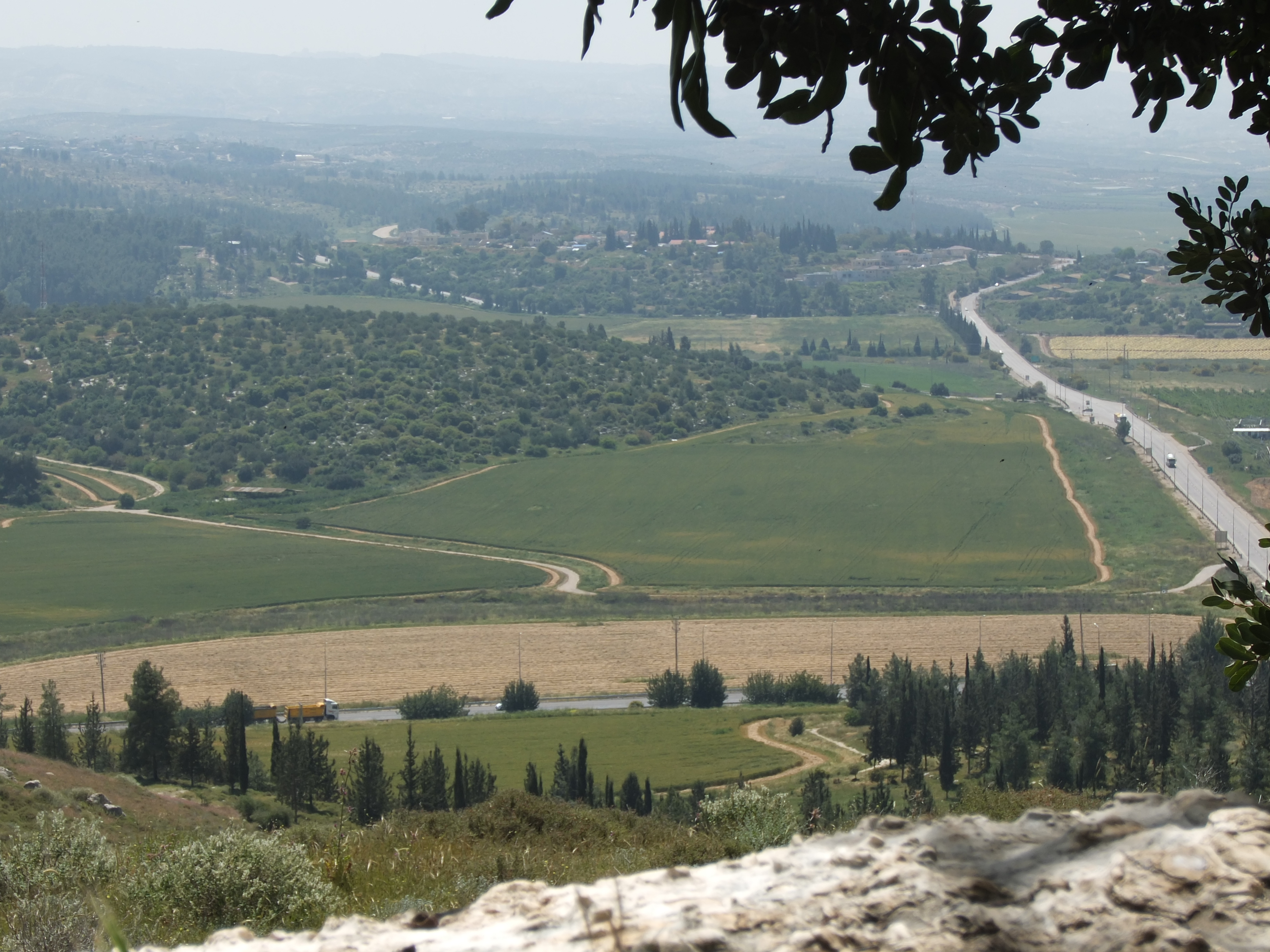
Carob tree on the ascent to Bayt Nattif

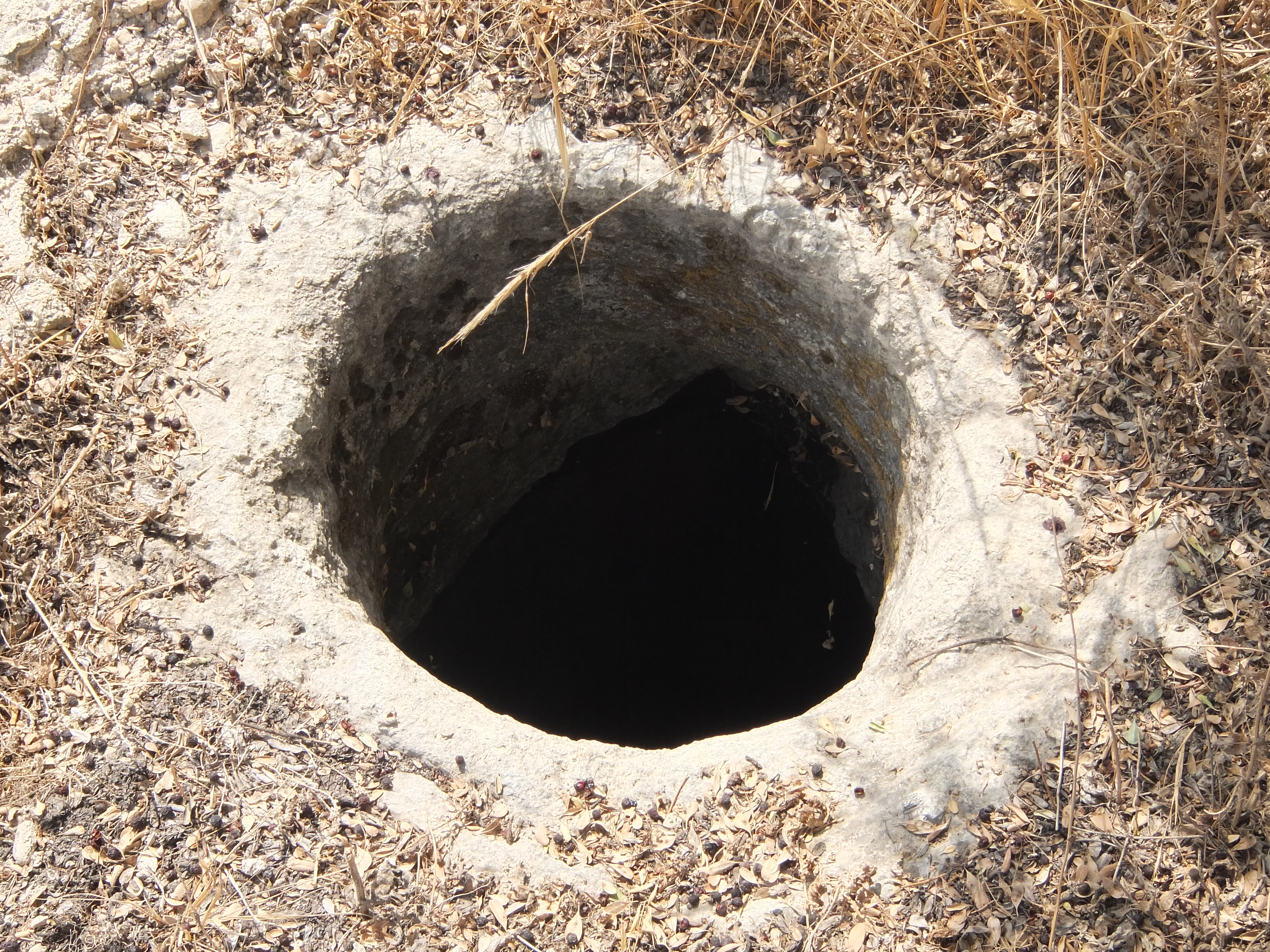
Mouth of cistern in Bayt Nattif

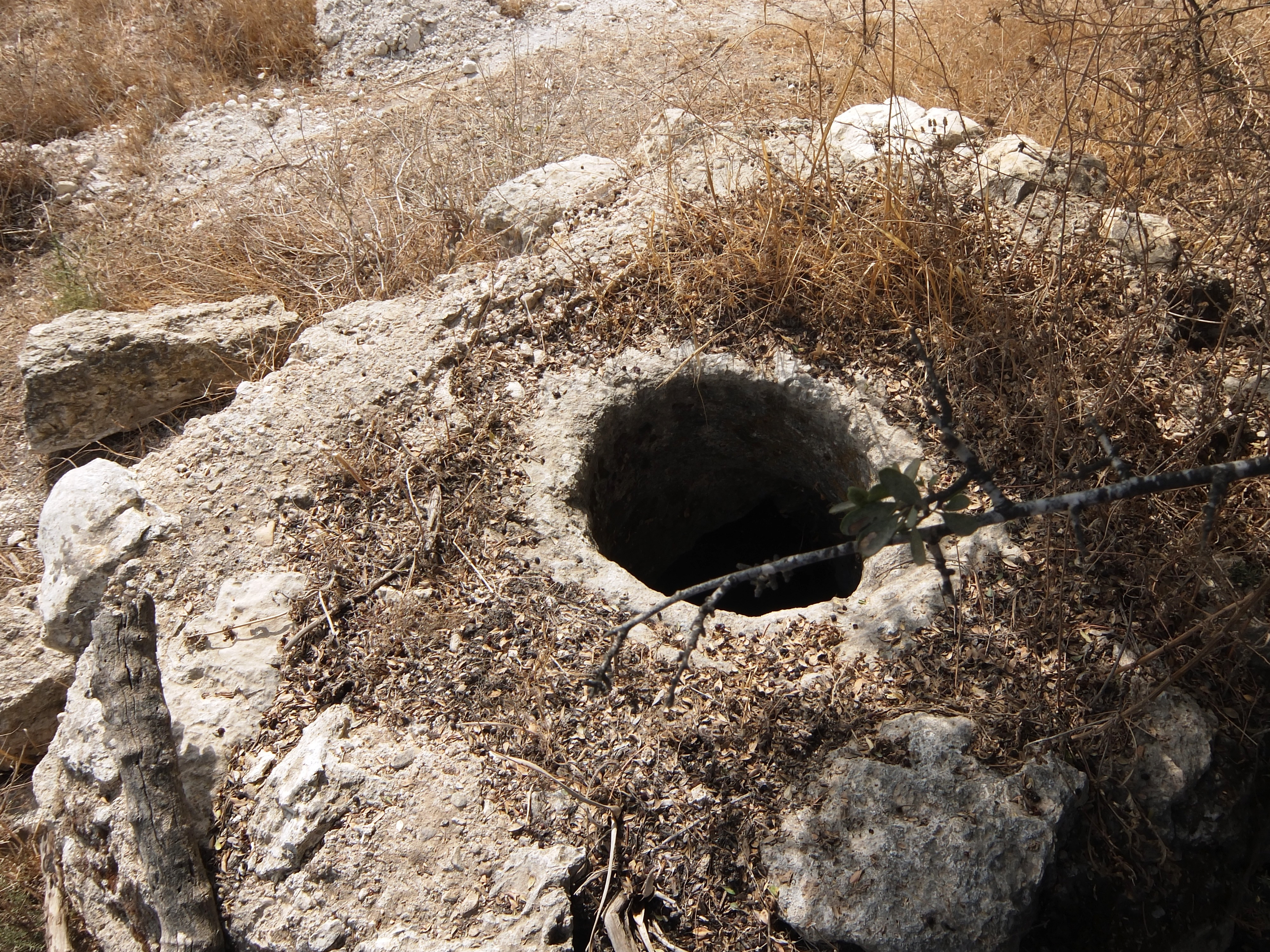
Old cistern with secure stone cover

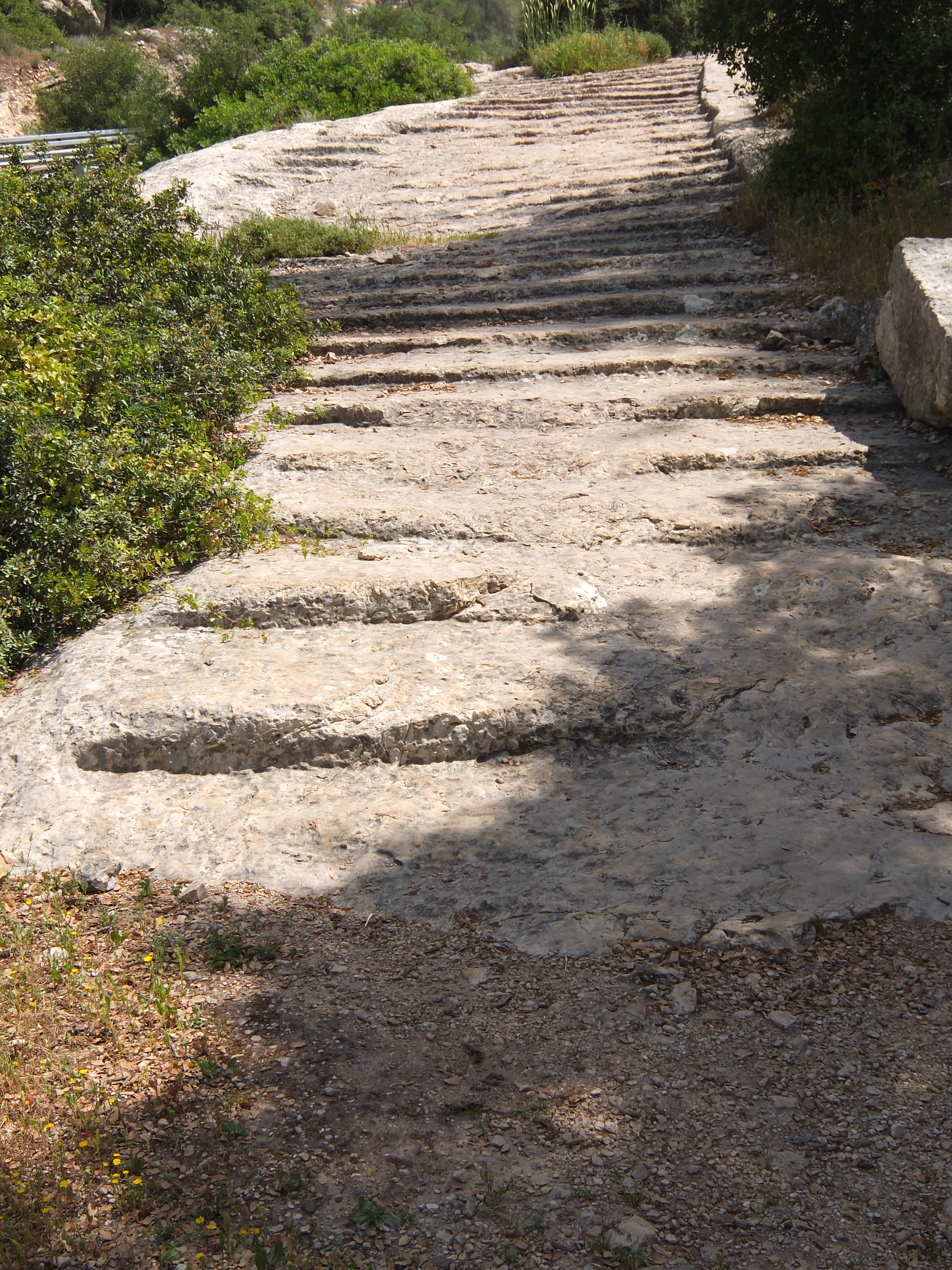
Carved steps along ancient Roman road, adjacent to regional hwy 375 in Israel (near Bayt Nattif)

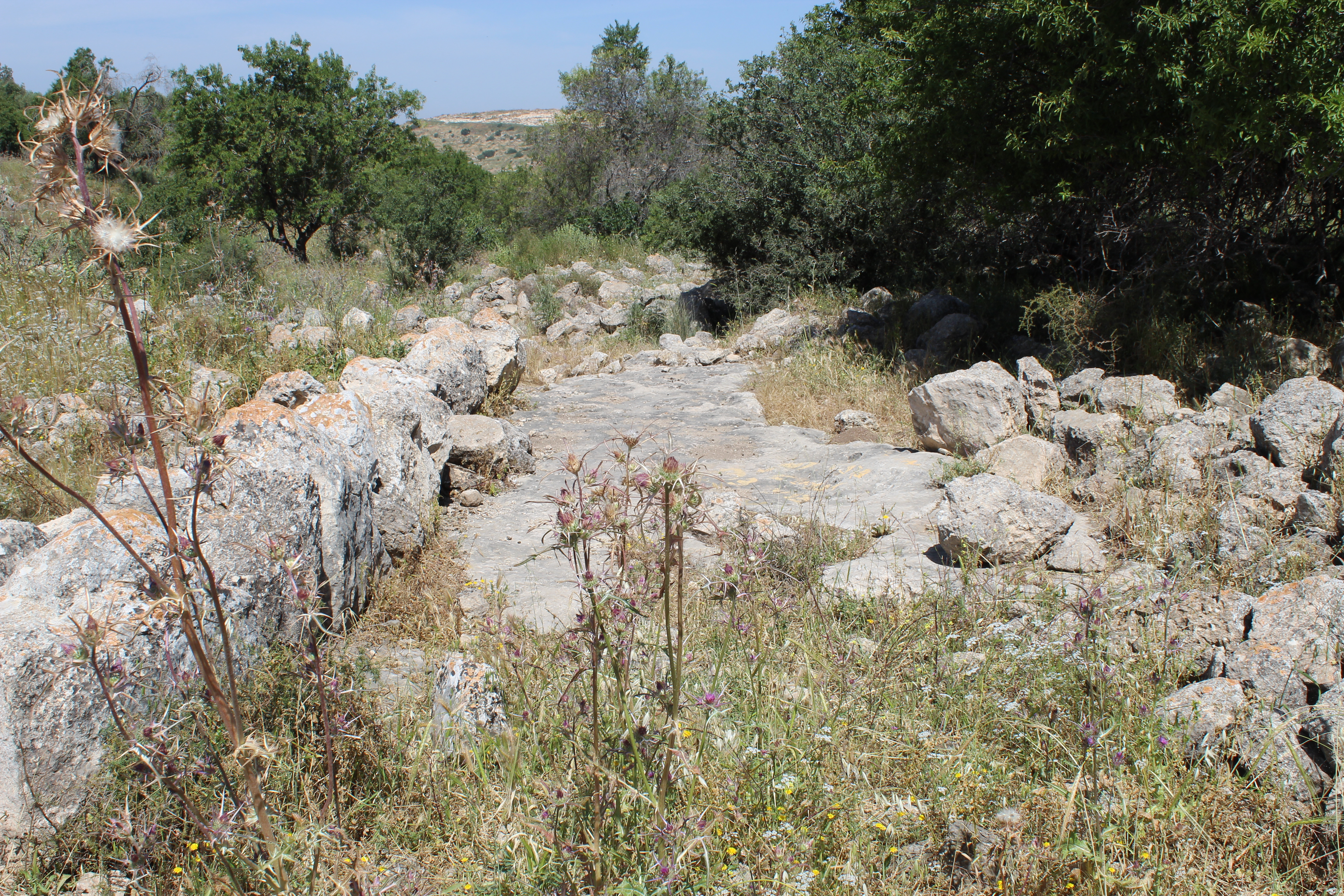
Old road in Bayt Nattif, lined with field stones

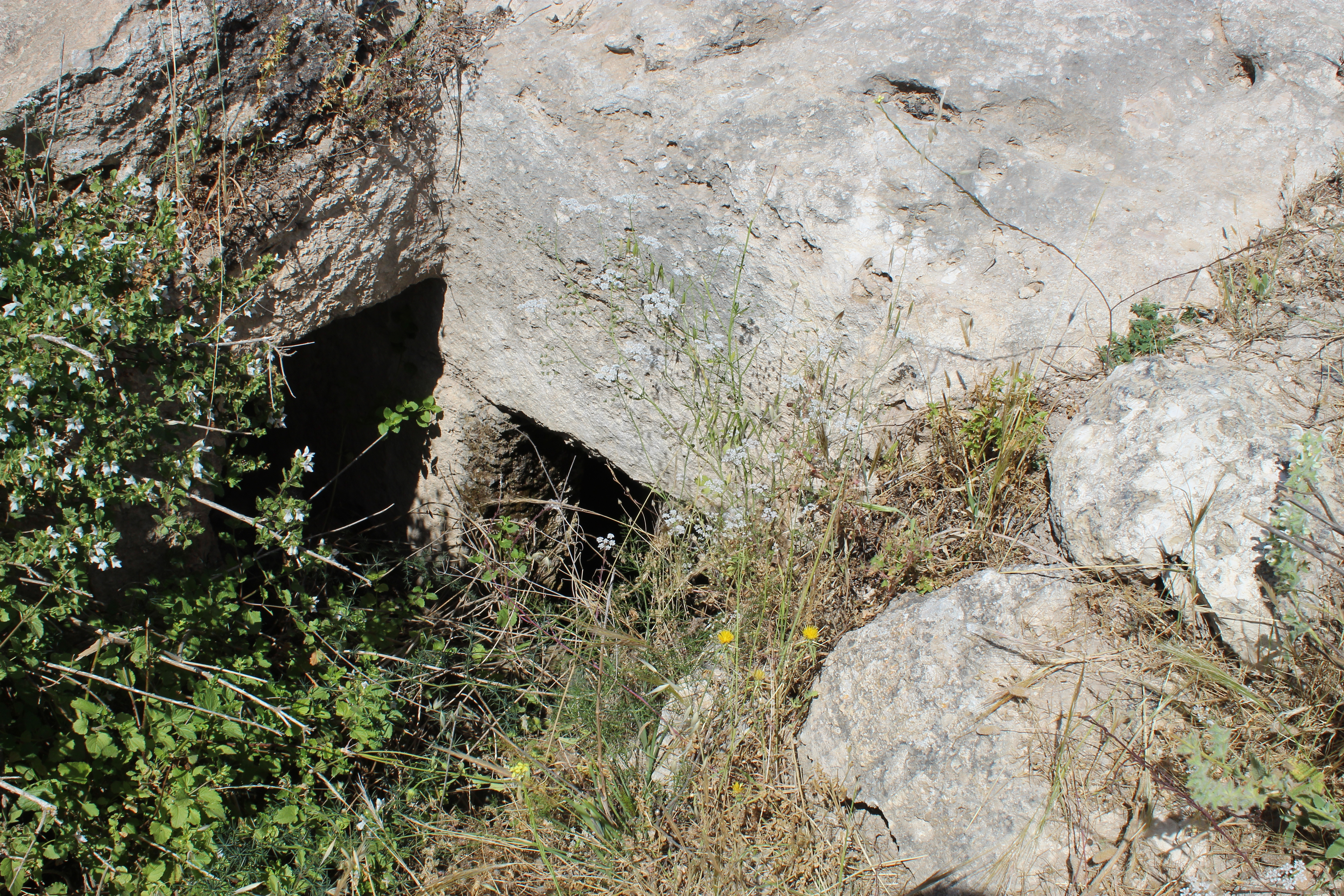
Tombs at Bayt Nattif

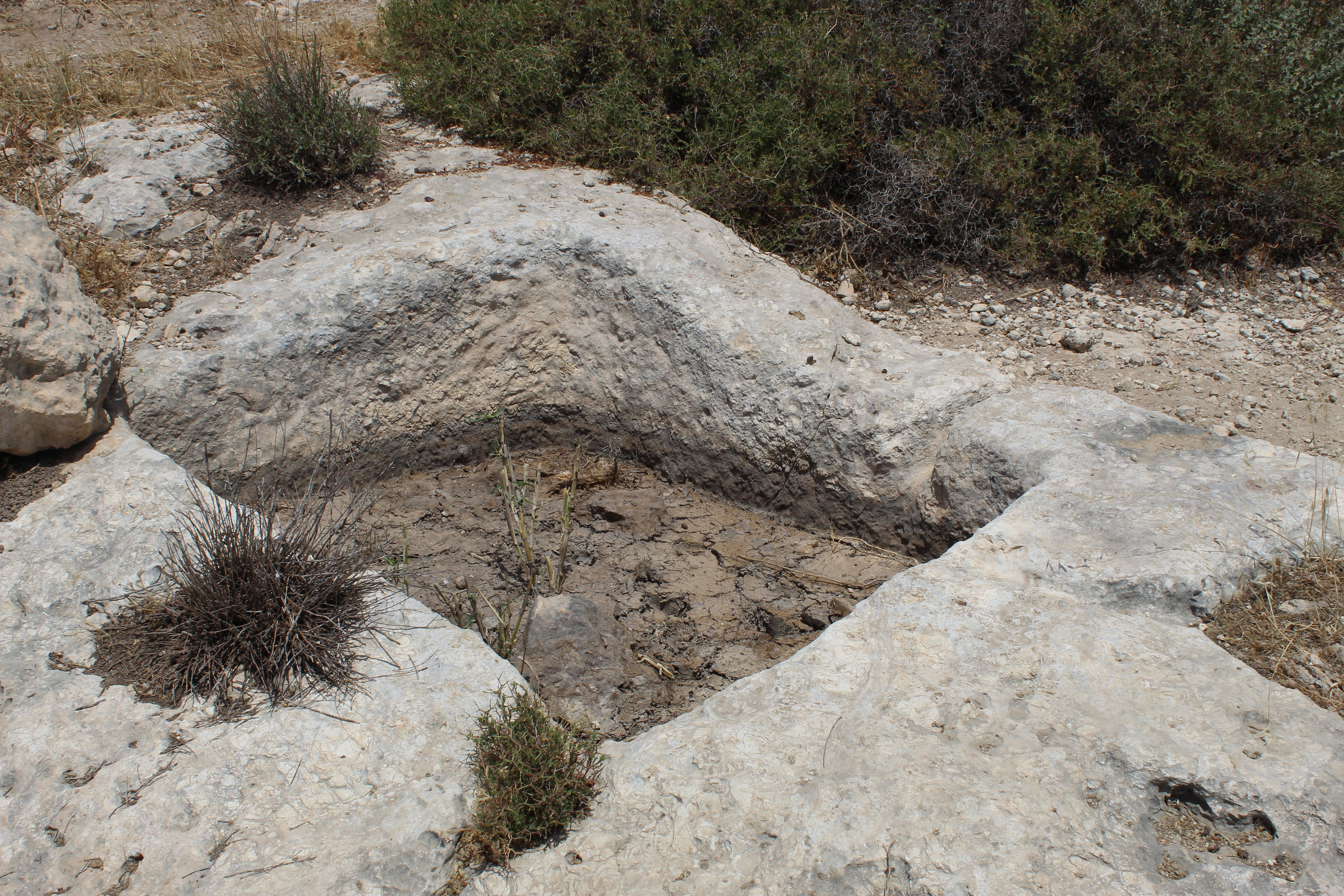
Wine press carved in rock at Bayt Nattif

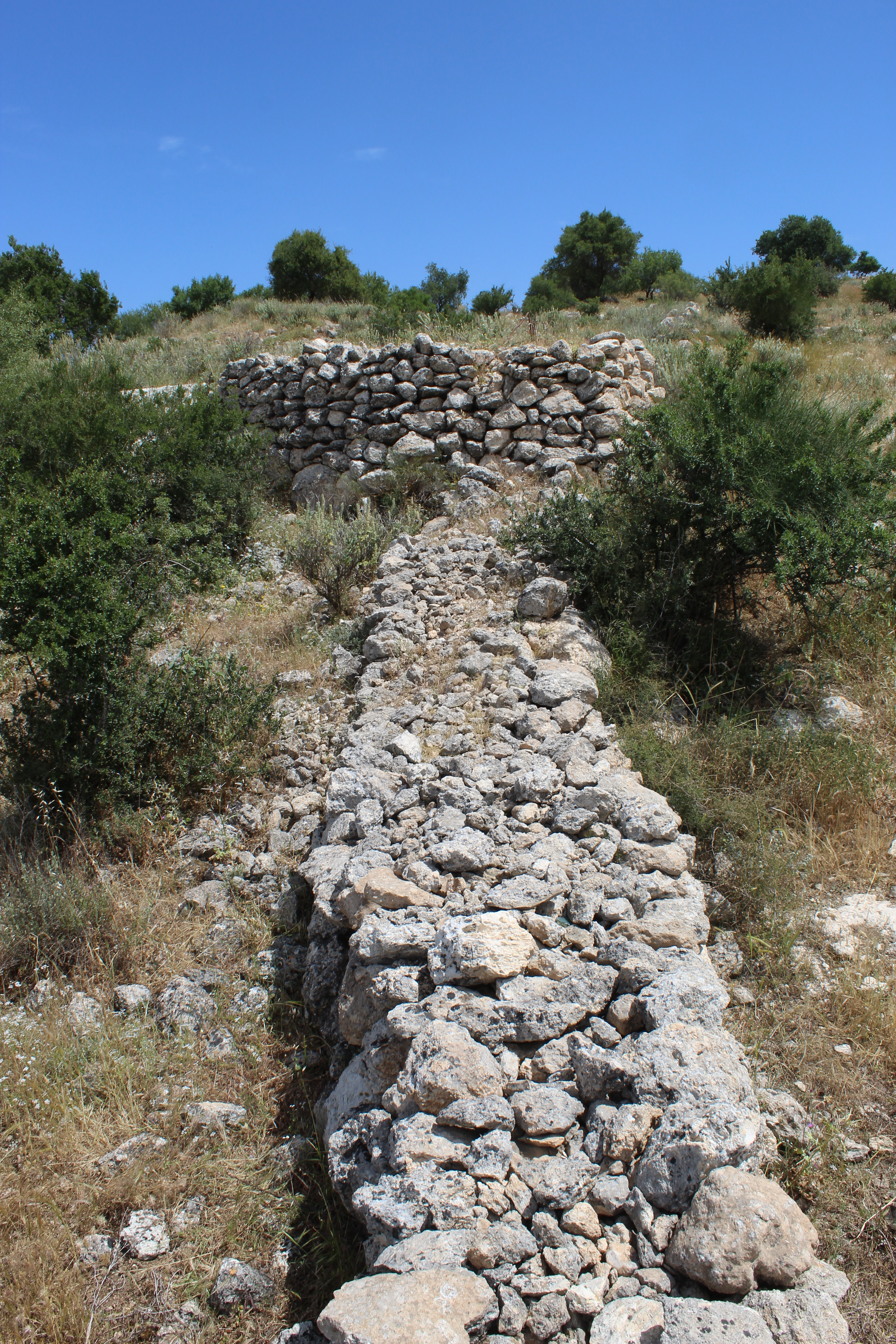
Walled structure at Bayt Nattif

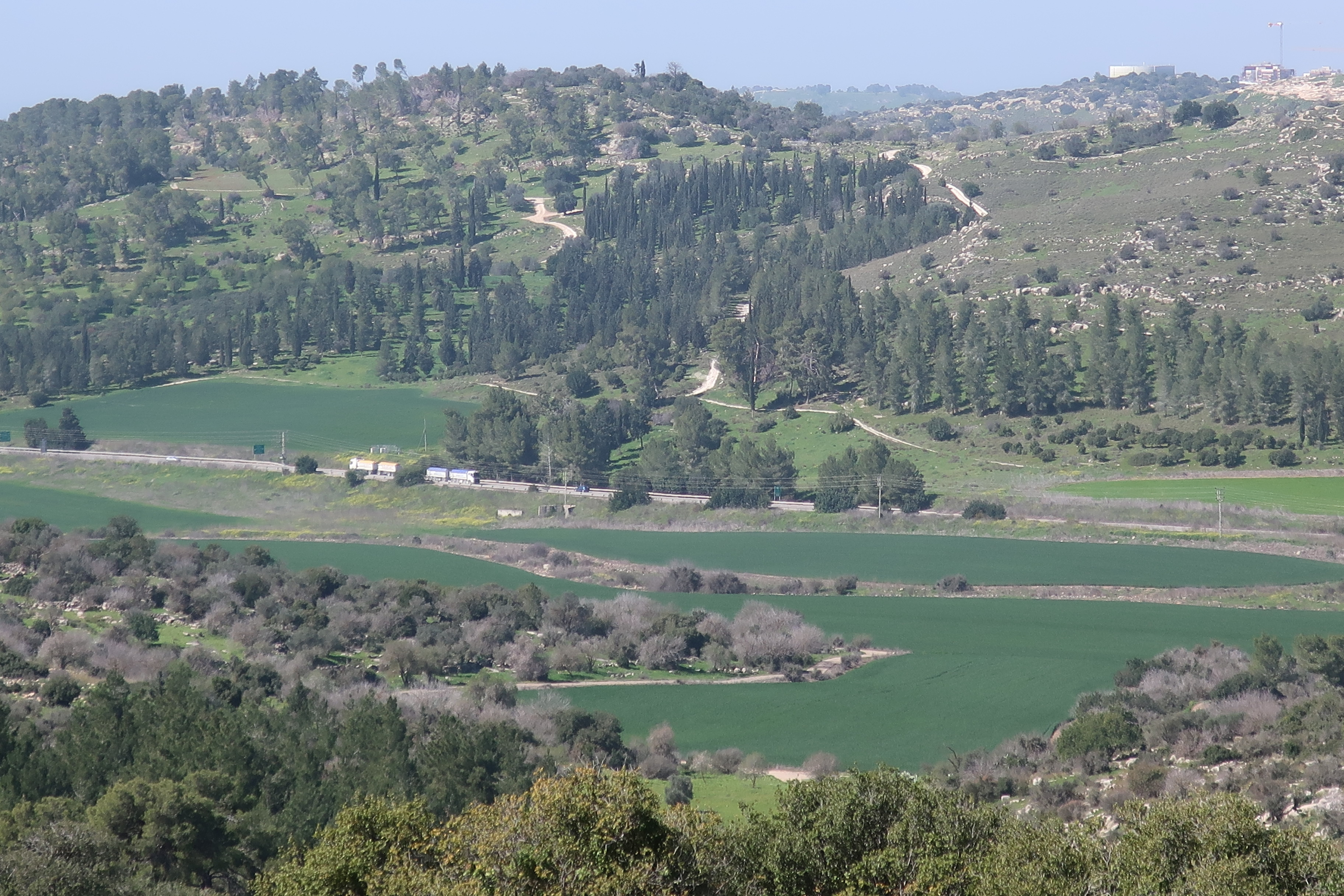
View overlooking the Elah valley towards Bayt Nattif

== See also ==
- List of villages depopulated during the Arab–Israeli conflict

== Bibliography ==
- Ameling, Walter; Cotton, H.; Eck, W.; Ecker, Avner; Isaac, B. (2018). Corpus Inscriptionum Iudaeae / Palaestinae. Vol. 4 (Iudaea / Idumaea). Berlin/Munich: De Gruyter & Co. ISBN 978-3-11-053744-4. OCLC 1010733192.
- Baramki, D.C. (1935). "Recent Discoveries of Byzantine Remains in Palestine. A Mosaic Pavement at Beit Nattif". Quarterly of the Department of Antiquities in Palestine. 4: 119–121.
- Baramki, D.C. (1936). "Two Roman Cisterns at Beit Nattif". Quarterly of the Department of Antiquities in Palestine. 5: 3–10.
- Barron, J. B., ed. (1923). Palestine: Report and General Abstracts of the Census of 1922. Government of Palestine.
- Benvenisti, M. (2002). Sacred Landscape: The Buried History of the Holy Land Since 1948. University of California Press. ISBN 978-0-520-23422-2.
- Conder, C.R.; Kitchener, H.H. (1883). The Survey of Western Palestine: Memoirs of the Topography, Orography, Hydrography, and Archaeology. Vol. 3. London: Committee of the Palestine Exploration Fund. (p. 52)
- Dauphin, C. (1998). La Palestine byzantine, Peuplement et Populations. BAR International Series 726 (in French). Vol. III : Catalogue. Oxford: Archeopress. ISBN 0-860549-05-4. (p. 918)
- Department of Statistics (1945). Village Statistics, April, 1945. Government of Palestine.
- Finn, J. (1878). E.A. Finn (ed.). Stirring Times, or, Records from Jerusalem Consular Chronicles of 1853 to 1856. Edited and Compiled by His Widow E. A. Finn. With a Preface by the Viscountess Strangford. Vol. 2. London: C.K. Paul & co.
- Greenwald, Roie (2017-09-07). "Horbat Bet Natif". Hadashot Arkheologiyot – Excavations and Surveys in Israel (129).
- Guérin, V. (1869). Description Géographique Historique et Archéologique de la Palestine (in French). Vol. 1: Judée, pt. 2. Paris: L'Imprimerie nationale.
- Guérin, V. (1869). Description Géographique Historique et Archéologique de la Palestine (in French). Vol. 1: Judée, pt. 3. Paris: L'Imprimerie nationale.
- Hadawi, S. (1970). Village Statistics of 1945: A Classification of Land and Area ownership in Palestine. Palestine Liberation Organization Research Center.
- Hartmann, M. (1883). "Die Ortschaftenliste des Liwa Jerusalem in dem türkischen Staatskalender für Syrien auf das Jahr 1288 der Flucht (1871)". Zeitschrift des Deutschen Palästina-Vereins. 6: 102–149.
- Hütteroth, W.-D.; Abdulfattah, K. (1977). Historical Geography of Palestine, Transjordan and Southern Syria in the Late 16th Century. Erlanger Geographische Arbeiten, Sonderband 5. Erlangen, Germany: Vorstand der Fränkischen Geographischen Gesellschaft. ISBN 3-920405-41-2.
- Josephus, De Bello Judaico (The Jewish War), Translated by William Whiston, A.M. Auburn and Buffalo. John E. Beardsley. 1895
- Khalidi, W. (1992). All that Remains: The Palestinian Villages Occupied and Depopulated by Israel in 1948. Washington DC: Institute for Palestine Studies. ISBN 0-88728-224-5.
- Klein, Eitan; Goldenberg, Gidon (2015-10-14). "Horbat Bet Natif". Hadashot Arkheologiyot – Excavations and Surveys in Israel (127).
- Mills, E., ed. (1932). Census of Palestine 1931. Population of Villages, Towns and Administrative Areas. Jerusalem: Government of Palestine.
- Morris, B. (2004). The Birth of the Palestinian Refugee Problem Revisited. Cambridge University Press. ISBN 978-0-521-00967-6.
- Morris, B. (2008). 1948: A History of the First Arab-Israeli War. Yale University Press. ISBN 978-1-902210-67-4.
- Palmer, E.H. (1881). The Survey of Western Palestine: Arabic and English Name Lists Collected During the Survey by Lieutenants Conder and Kitchener, R. E. Transliterated and Explained by E.H. Palmer. Committee of the Palestine Exploration Fund.
- Petersen, Andrew (2001). A Gazetteer of Buildings in Muslim Palestine (British Academy Monographs in Archaeology). Vol. I. Oxford University Press. ISBN 978-0-19-727011-0.
- Radashkovsky, Igal (2019-09-26). "Horbat Bet Natif". Hadashot Arkheologiyot – Excavations and Surveys in Israel (131).
- Robinson, E.; Smith, E. (1841). Biblical Researches in Palestine, Mount Sinai and Arabia Petraea: A Journal of Travels in the year 1838. Vol. 2. Boston: Crocker & Brewster.
- Robinson, E.; Smith, E. (1841). Biblical Researches in Palestine, Mount Sinai and Arabia Petraea: A Journal of Travels in the year 1838. Vol. 3. Boston: Crocker & Brewster.
- Schick, C. (1896). "Zur Einwohnerzahl des Bezirks Jerusalem". Zeitschrift des Deutschen Palästina-Vereins. 19: 120–127.
- Schölch, A. (1993). Palestine in Transformation, 1856-1882: Studies in Social, Economic, and Political Development (PDF). Institute for Palestine Studies. ISBN 0-88728-234-2.
- Shalev, Omer (2021-12-27). "Ramat Bet Shemesh, Horbat Bet Natif". Hadashot Arkheologiyot – Excavations and Surveys in Israel (133).
- Shalev, Omer; Balila, Moran; Benenstein, Nicolas (2022-04-04). "Horbat Bet Natif". Hadashot Arkheologiyot – Excavations and Surveys in Israel (134).
- Socin, A. (1879). "Alphabetisches Verzeichniss von Ortschaften des Paschalik Jerusalem". Zeitschrift des Deutschen Palästina-Vereins. 2: 135–163.
- Storchan, Benyamin (2021-10-31). "Ramat Bet Shemesh, Horbat Bet Natif". Hadashot Arkheologiyot – Excavations and Surveys in Israel (133).
- Toledano, E. (1984). "The Sanjaq of Jerusalem in the Sixteenth Century: Aspects of Topography and Population". Archivum Ottomanicum. 9: 279–319. Archived from the original on 2016-03-05.
- Tsafrir, Y.; Leah Di Segni; Judith Green (1994). (TIR): Tabula Imperii Romani: Judaea, Palaestina. Jerusalem: Israel Academy of Sciences and Humanities. ISBN 965-208-107-8.
- Zissu, Boaz [in Hebrew]; Klein, Eitan (2011). "A Rock-Cut Burial Cave from the Roman Period at Beit Nattif, Judaean Foothills". Israel Exploration Journal. 61 (2). Israel Exploration Society: 196–216. JSTOR 23214241.
