= Tarum =

Tarum: תרום (Hebrew)
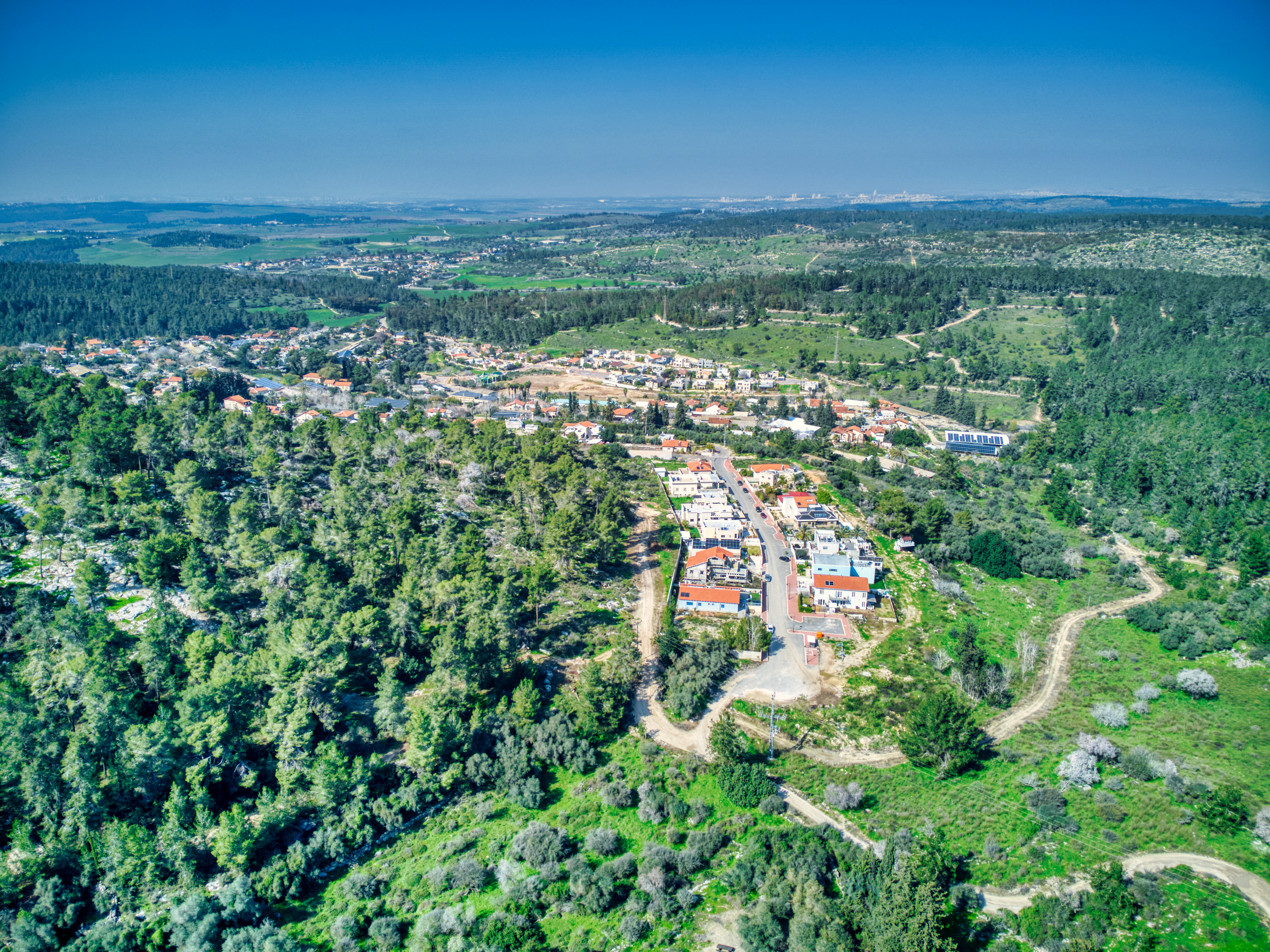

- Location within Jerusalem District Location within Israel
- Coordinates: 31°46′58″N 34°58′56″E
- Country: Israel
- District: Jerusalem
- Council: Mateh Yehuda
- Affiliation: Hapoel HaMizrachi
- Founded: 1950
- Founder: Yemenite Jews
- Population (2024): 919

Tarum (Hebrew: תָּרוּם, lit. 'Exalted') is a moshav in central Israel. Located to the north of Beit Shemesh with an area of 1,800 dunams, it falls under the jurisdiction of Mateh Yehuda Regional Council. In 2024 it had a population of 919. Tarum is built near the ancient biblical town of Zorah.

== History ==
Tarum was established in 1950 on land which had previously belonged to the depopulated Palestinian village of Sar'a before the 1948 Arab-Israeli War.

The founders of Tarum were immigrants from Yemen, who were later joined by Cochin Jews from India. Its name is taken from Psalms 89:14, as is the name of the neighbouring moshav Ta'oz;

Thine is an arm with might; strong is Thy hand, and exalted is Thy right hand.
