= Ishwa =

Ishwa إشوع
- Former village
- Etymology: from Eshua, personal name
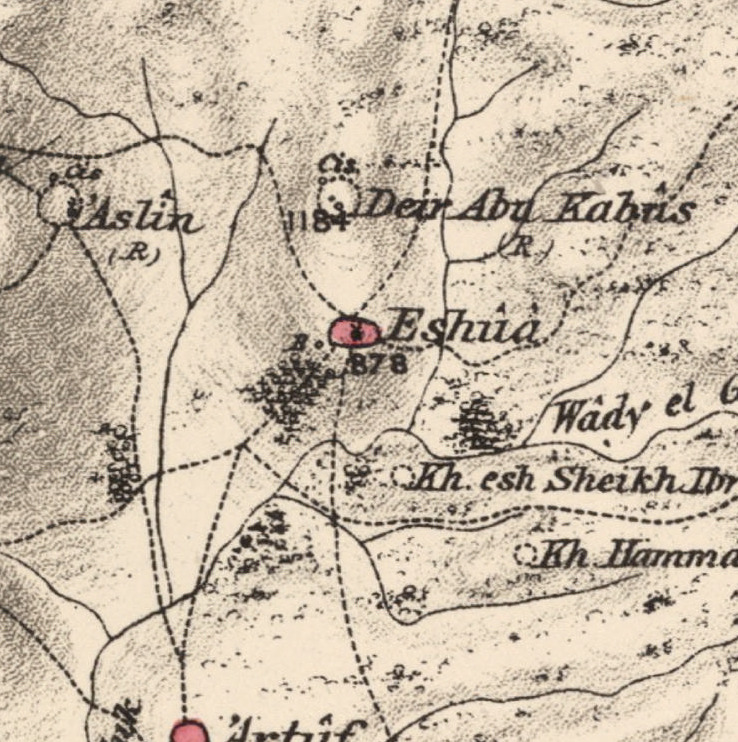
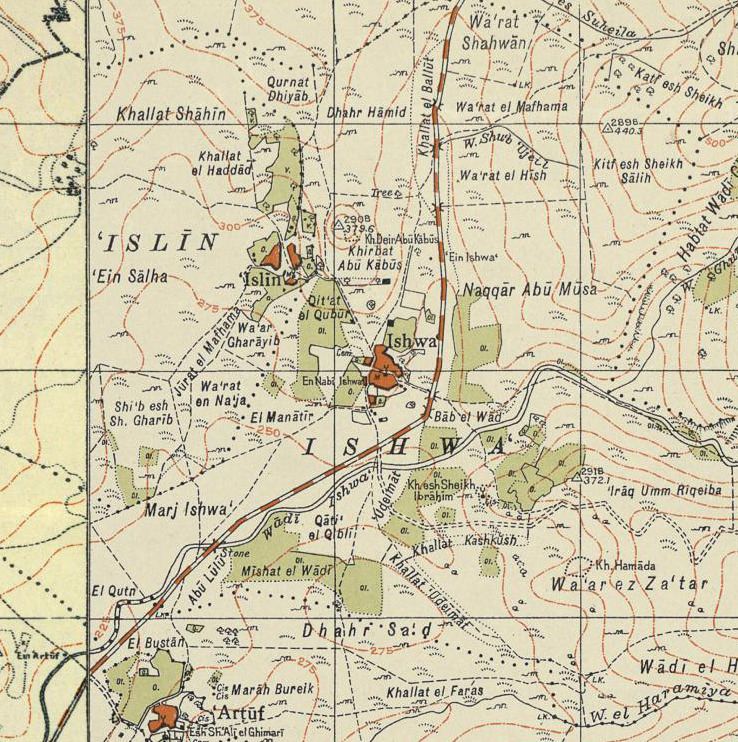
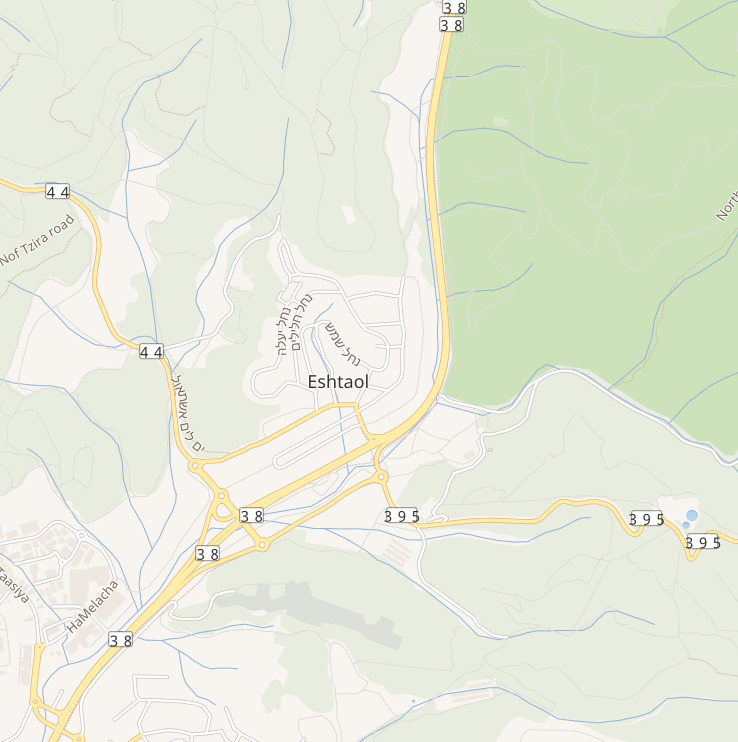
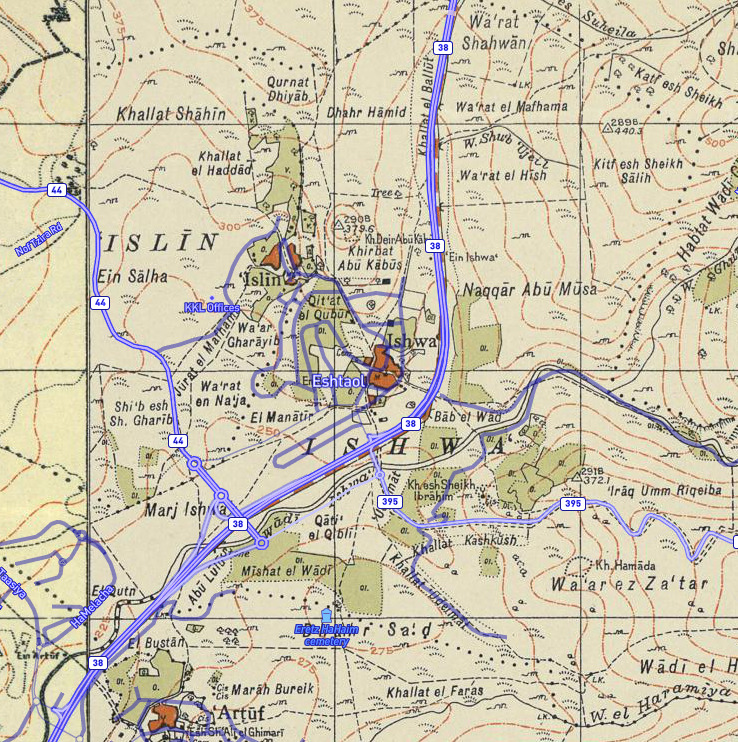
- 1870s map 1940s map modern map 1940s with modern overlay map A series of historical maps of the area around Ishwa (click the buttons)

- Location within Mandatory Palestine
- Coordinates: 31°46′50″N 35°00′40″E
- Palestine grid: 151/132
- Geopolitical entity: Mandatory Palestine
- Subdistrict: Jerusalem
- Date of depopulation: 18 July 1948

Population (1948)
  - Total: 719
- Cause(s) of depopulation: Military assault by Yishuv forces
- Current Localities: Eshtaol

Ishwa' (Arabic: إشوع) was a Palestinian village which was depopulated during the 1948 Arab-Israeli war. The village was located about 20 km west of Jerusalem, on the present location of Eshta'ol. In the 1931 British census of Palestine, Ishwa had a population of 468 in 126 houses. The village was occupied by the Israel Defense Forces (IDF) on July 16, 1948, in Operation Dani by the Harel Brigade. All of its inhabitants fled or were expelled.

== History ==
Ishwa was an ancient village, situated at the foot of a hill.

It is thought to have been established over the site of the Israelite city of Eshtaol, famous for the biblical story of Samson. It was known by that name during the Roman Empire era, when it fell within the administrative district of Eleutheropolis (Bayt Jibrin). However, Dayr Abu al-Qabus, located 0.5 kilometers (0.31 mi) to the north has also been identified with Eshta'ol.

=== Ottoman era ===
During the 16th century CE, settlement seems to have shifted to the northwest to Islin. During the 17th or 18th century the site of Islin went out of use, and Ishwa was probably repopulated.

In 1863 the French explorer Victor Guérin visited and found the village to have barely 300 inhabitants. The only ancient remains was a ruined arch near the well, which he thought was possibly dated to the Roman period. An Ottoman village list of about 1870 counted 32 houses and a population of 90 in Schu’a, though the population count included men, only. It was described as being in the Hebron district, just east of Sar'a.

By 1875, it had a population of 450. In 1883, the PEF's Survey of Western Palestine (SWP) described it as being built near the foot of a hill and with olive trees planted below the village. Ishwa had a star-shaped configuration, its mostly stone houses extending along the roads leading to other villages.

In 1896 the population of Aschuwa' was estimated to be about 354 persons.

=== British Mandate era ===
In the 1922 census of Palestine conducted by the British Mandate authorities, Ishwa had a population of 379, all Muslim. This had increased by the time of the 1931 census to 468, still all Muslim, in 117 houses.

In the 1945 statistics the population was 620, all Muslims while the total land area was 5,522 dunams, according to an official land and population survey. Of this, 473 were allocated for plantations and irrigable land, 1,911 for cereals, while 47 dunams were classified as built-up areas.

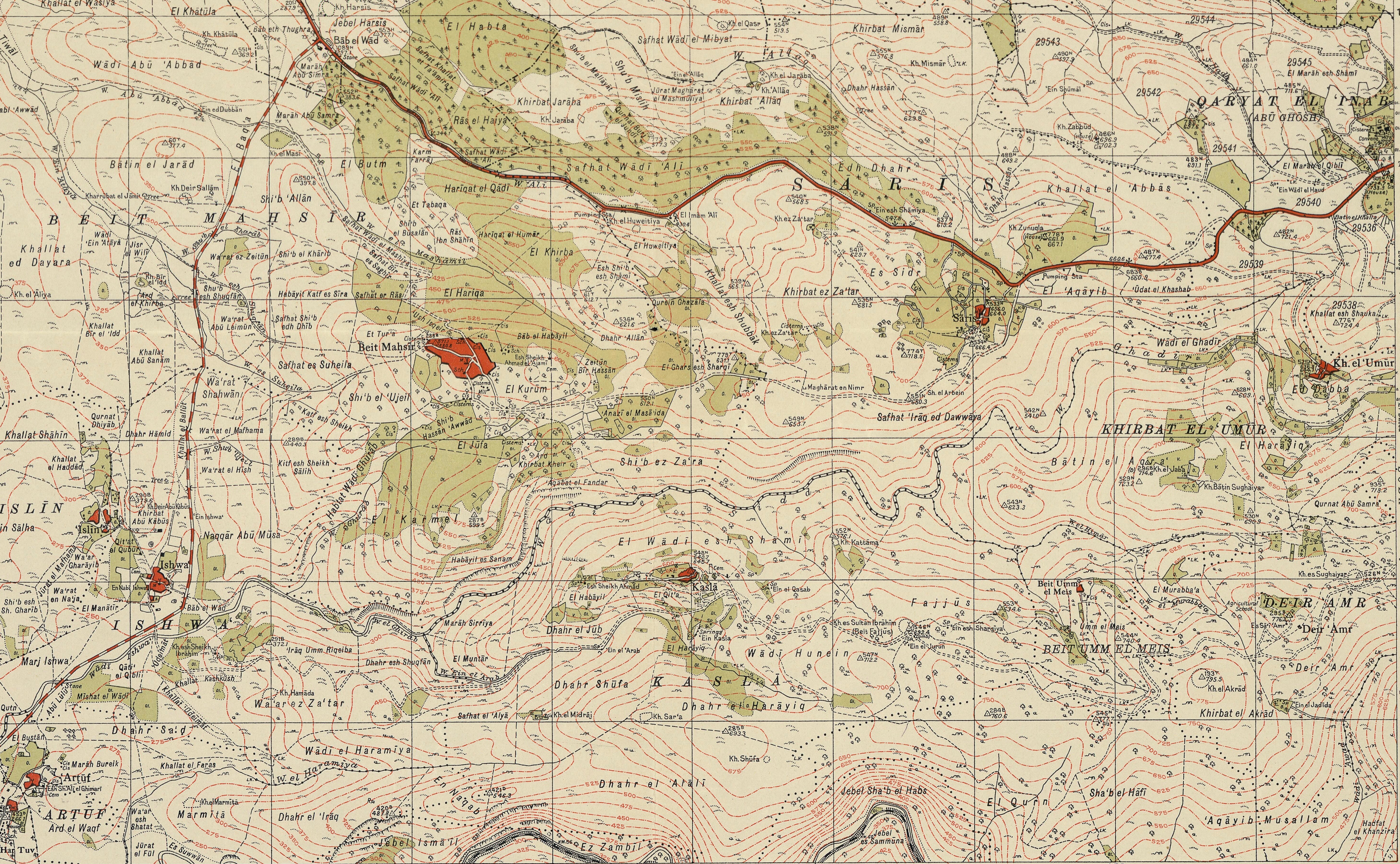
Ishwa 1943 1:20,000 (left)

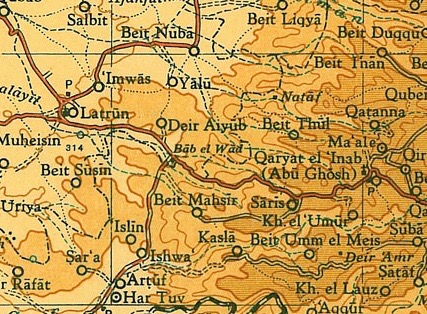
Bayt Mahsir 1945 1:250,000 (lower left quadrant)

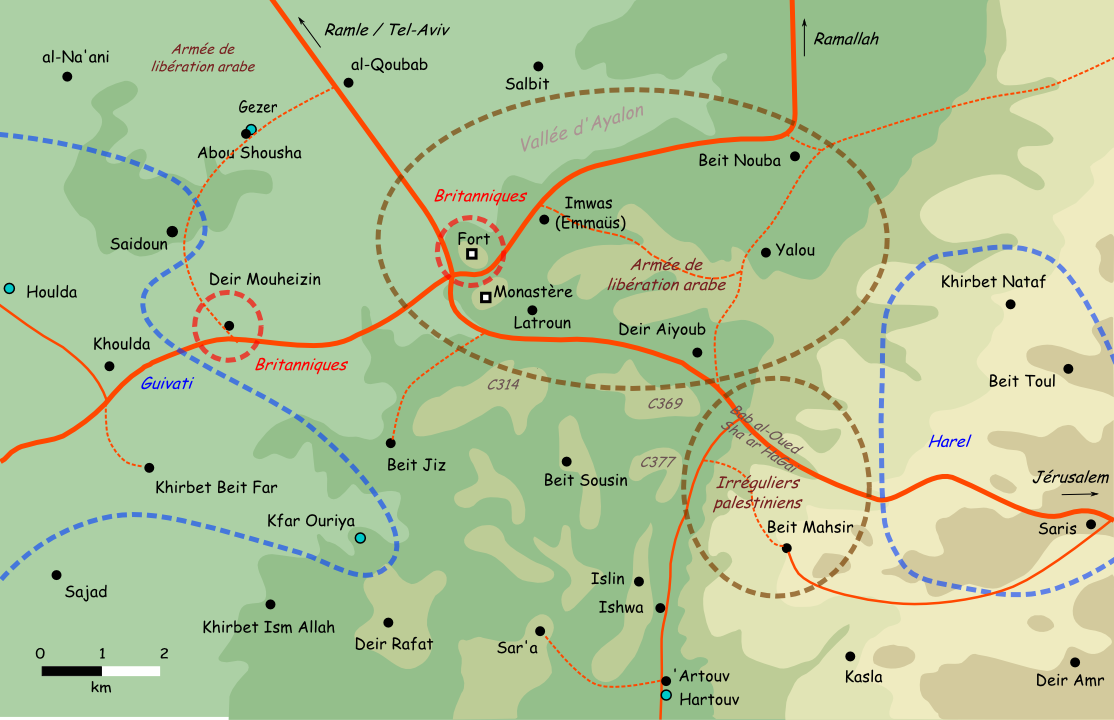
Bayt Mahsir May 10 1948

=== 1948 Arab–Israeli War and aftermath ===
Ishwa, along with four other villages, were overtaken by the Israeli Harel Brigade on 17–18 July 1948 in Operation Dani. The villages had been on the front line since April 1948 and most of the inhabitants of these villages had already left the area. Many of those who stayed fled when Israeli forces attacked and the few who remained at each village were expelled.

Following the war, the area was incorporated into the State of Israel. In 1949 the moshav of Eshtaol was established on land that had belonged to Ishwa and nearby Islin.

In 1992 Palestinian historian Walid Khalidi noted that: "Only a few of the village houses remain on the site, interspersed among the settlement's houses; some serve as residences and warehouses. The village cemetery, next to the administrative building of the settlement, has been levelled and planted with grass. On the southern edge of the cemetery is a cave that contains the large grindstone of a flour mill. Olive and carob trees grow on the site, among other trees more recently planted by the settlers. At the western edge of the village is a soccer field. The walls and fallen roofs of the destroyed houses can be seen at the edge of this field." In 1998, a book about the village was published in Jordan.

== See also ==
- List of villages depopulated during the Arab–Israeli conflict

== Bibliography ==
- Barron, J.B., ed. (1923). Palestine: Report and General Abstracts of the Census of 1922. Government of Palestine.
- Conder, C.R.; Kitchener, H. H. (1883). The Survey of Western Palestine: Memoirs of the Topography, Orography, Hydrography, and Archaeology. Vol. 3. London: Committee of the Palestine Exploration Fund.
- Davis, Rochelle (2011). Palestinian Village Histories: Geographies of the Displaced. Stanford: Stanford University Press. ISBN 978-0-8047-7313-3.
- Dauphin, C. (1998). La Palestine byzantine, Peuplement et Populations. BAR International Series 726 (in French). Vol. III : Catalogue. Oxford: Archeopress. ISBN 0-860549-05-4.
- Government of Palestine, Department of Statistics (1945). Village Statistics, April, 1945.
- Guérin, V. (1869). Description Géographique Historique et Archéologique de la Palestine (in French). Vol. 1: Judee, pt. 2. Paris: L'Imprimerie Nationale.
- Hadawi, S. (1970). Village Statistics of 1945: A Classification of Land and Area ownership in Palestine. Palestine Liberation Organization Research Center.
- Hartmann, M. (1883). "Die Ortschaftenliste des Liwa Jerusalem in dem türkischen Staatskalender für Syrien auf das Jahr 1288 der Flucht (1871)". Zeitschrift des Deutschen Palästina-Vereins. 6: 102–149.
- Kan‘aan, Deeb Ahmad. 1998. Ishwa‘: Qarya Filastiniyya [Ishwa‘: A Palestinian village]. Jordan.
- Khalidi, W. (1992). All That Remains: The Palestinian Villages Occupied and Depopulated by Israel in 1948. Washington D.C.: Institute for Palestine Studies. ISBN 0-88728-224-5.
- Mills, E., ed. (1932). Census of Palestine 1931. Population of Villages, Towns and Administrative Areas. Jerusalem: Government of Palestine.
- Morris, B. (2004). The Birth of the Palestinian Refugee Problem Revisited. Cambridge University Press. ISBN 0-521-00967-7.
- Palmer, E.H. (1881). The Survey of Western Palestine: Arabic and English Name Lists Collected During the Survey by Lieutenants Conder and Kitchener, R. E. Transliterated and Explained by E.H. Palmer. Committee of the Palestine Exploration Fund.
- Schick, C. (1896). "Zur Einwohnerzahl des Bezirks Jerusalem". Zeitschrift des Deutschen Palästina-Vereins. 19: 120–127.
- Socin, A. (1879). "Alphabetisches Verzeichniss von Ortschaften des Paschalik Jerusalem". Zeitschrift des Deutschen Palästina-Vereins. 2: 135–163.
