= Sar'a =

Sar'a صرعة Surah
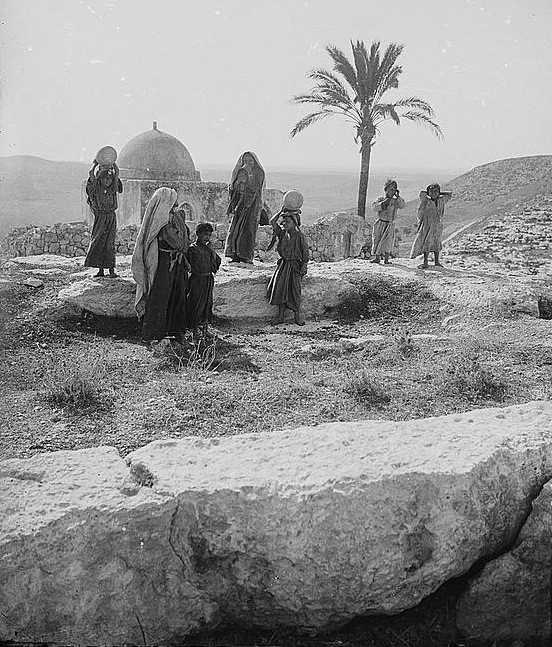
- Neby Samit, picture taken between 1900 and 1920
- Etymology: from Zoreah
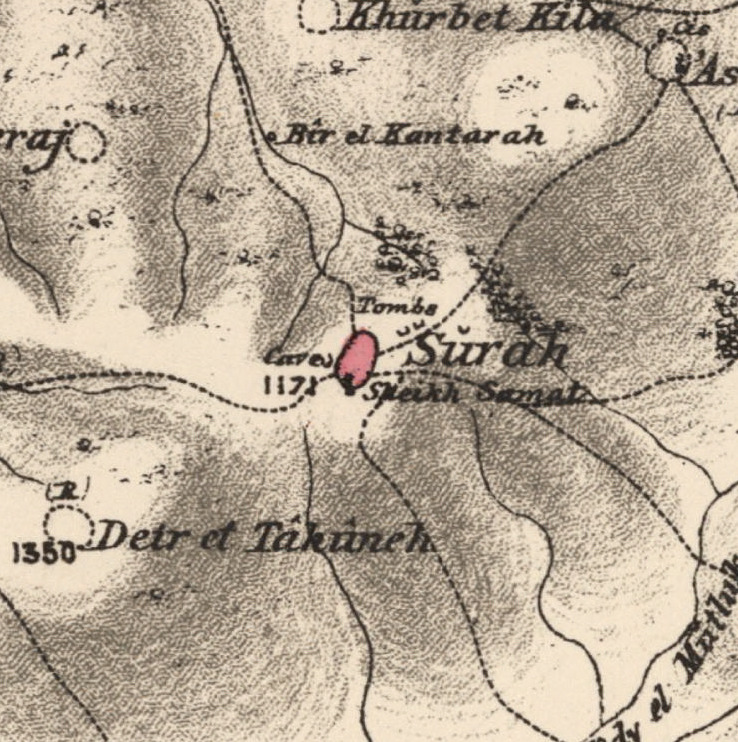
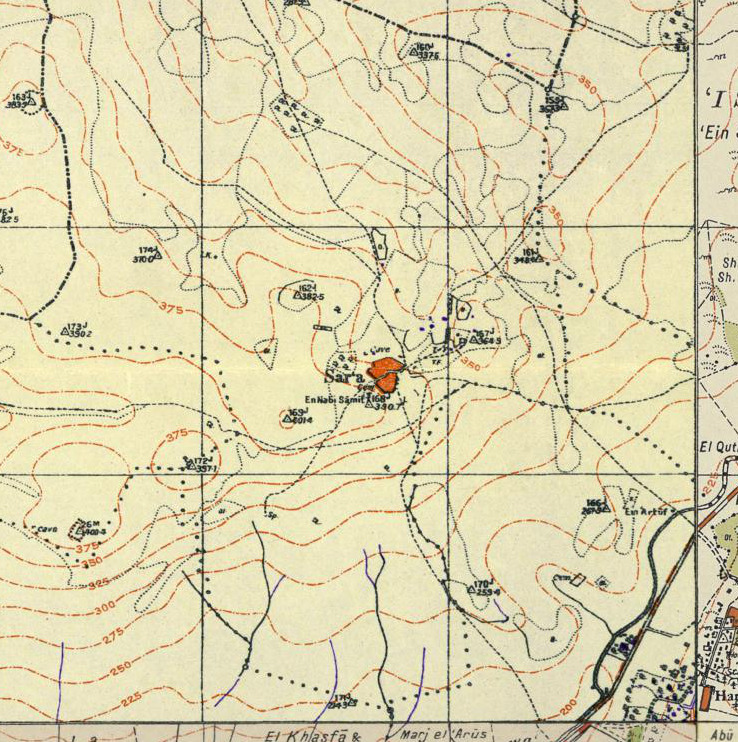
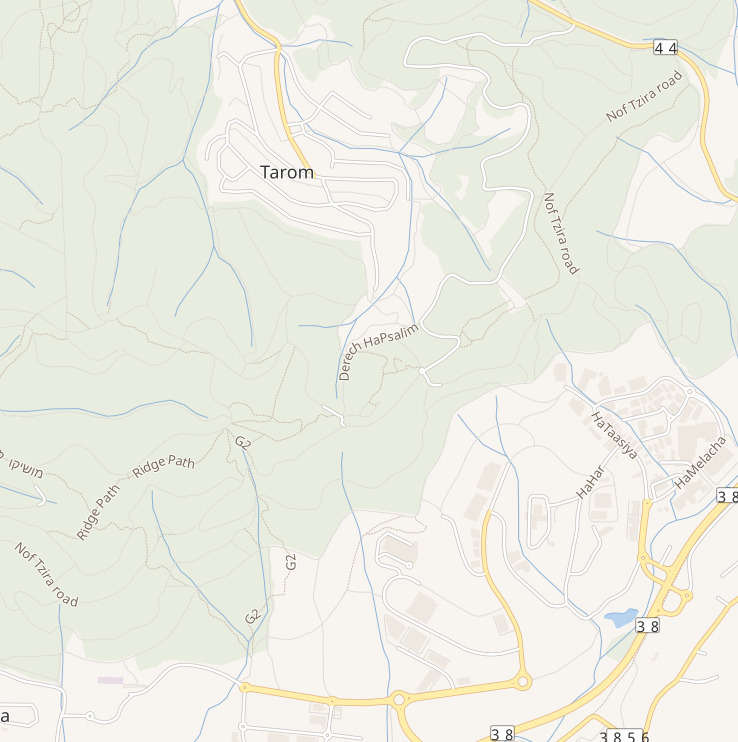
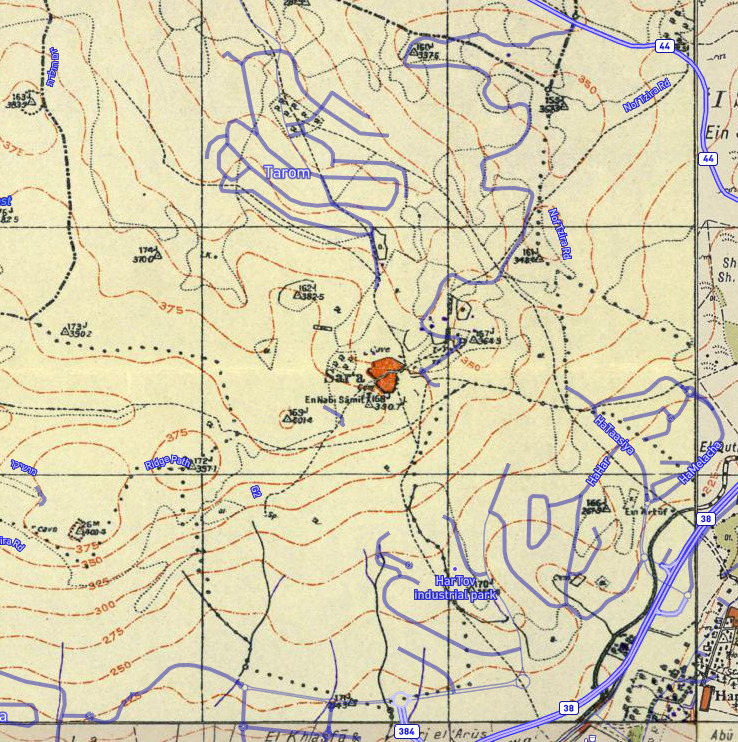
- 1870s map 1940s map modern map 1940s with modern overlay map A series of historical maps of the area around Sar'a (click the buttons)

- Location within Mandatory Palestine
- Coordinates: 31°46′31″N 34°59′6″E
- Palestine grid: 148/131
- Geopolitical entity: Mandatory Palestine
- Subdistrict: Jerusalem
- Date of depopulation: July 18, 1948

Area
  - Total: 4,967 dunams (4.967 km^{2}; 1.918 sq mi)

Population (1945)
  - Total: 340
- Cause(s) of depopulation: Military assault by Yishuv forces
- Current Localities: Tarum Zorah

Sar'a (Arabic: صرعة), was a Palestinian Arab village located 25 km west of Jerusalem, depopulated in the 1948 war. The site lies on a hill, at an elevation of about 1,150 feet (350 m) above sea-level.

== History ==
=== Bronze Age to Roman period ===
Sar'a might have been built on the ancient Canaanite site of Zorah, which became a Danaite town.

The Romans called it Sarea.

=== Ottoman period ===
Incorporated into the Ottoman Empire in 1517 with the rest of Palestine, Saris appears in the 1596 tax records as a village in the nahiya (subdistrict) of al-Ramla under the liwa' (district) of Gaza with a population 17 Muslim households, an estimated 94 persons. The villagers paid taxes on a number of crops, including wheat, barley, olives, goats and beehives a total of 6,000 Akçe.

In 1838 Edward Robinson reported that the village belonged to the "Keis" faction, together with Laham Sheiks, of Bayt 'Itab.

In 1863 Victor Guérin found it to be a village with some three hundred inhabitants. An Ottoman village list of about 1870 indicated 21 houses and a population of 59, though the population count included only men.

C.R. Conder visited the site in 1873, recognizing it as "the ancient Zoreah," and described it as being "a little mud village." In 1883, the PEF's Survey of Western Palestine (SWP) wrote that it was a moderate sized village, standing on a low hill. A domed maqam, Neby Samat, stood to the south. SWP further noted "Caves exist here, and ruined tombs; one was a square chamber without loculi; another, a large tomb with a rock pillar, but now much broken, and the plan of the original form destroyed. This tomb is close to the Mukam of Neby Samit—a domed chamber, with an outer chamber to the west, and a door to the north, on which side is a courtyard, with a palm tree. The chamber has a mihrab, and by it are green rags, said to be the Prophet's clothes. In the court are two Arab graves. To the west are several kokim tombs (stone carved sepulchres) full of bones and skulls. Other caves, cisterns, and a wine-press, north of the Mukam, were observed." Sheikh Samit, or Samat, was said to have been the brother of Shemshun el Jabar, whose Neby was at Ishwa.

J. Geikie described the shrine in the 1880s: "A mukam, or shrine, of a Mussulman saint stands on the south side of the village; a low square building of stone, with a humble dome and a small court, within an old stone wall, at the side. You enter the yard through a small door in this wall, up two or three steps, but beyond the bare walls, and a solitary palm-tree, twice the height of the wall, there is nothing to see. Sheikh Samat, whoever he was, lies solitary enough and well forgotten in his airy sepulchre, but the whitewash covering his resting-place marks a custom which is universal with Mussulman tombs of this kind."

In 1896 the population of Sar'a was estimated to be about 168 persons.

=== British Mandate ===
In the 1922 census of Palestine conducted by the British Mandate authorities, Sara'a had a population 205, all Muslims, increasing in the 1931 census to 271, still all Muslims, in 65 houses.

In the 1945 statistics the population of Sar'a was 340, all Muslims, who owned 4,967 dunams of land according to an official land and population survey. Of the land, 194 dunams were plantations and irrigable land and 2,979 were for cereals, while 16 dunams were built-up (urban) land.

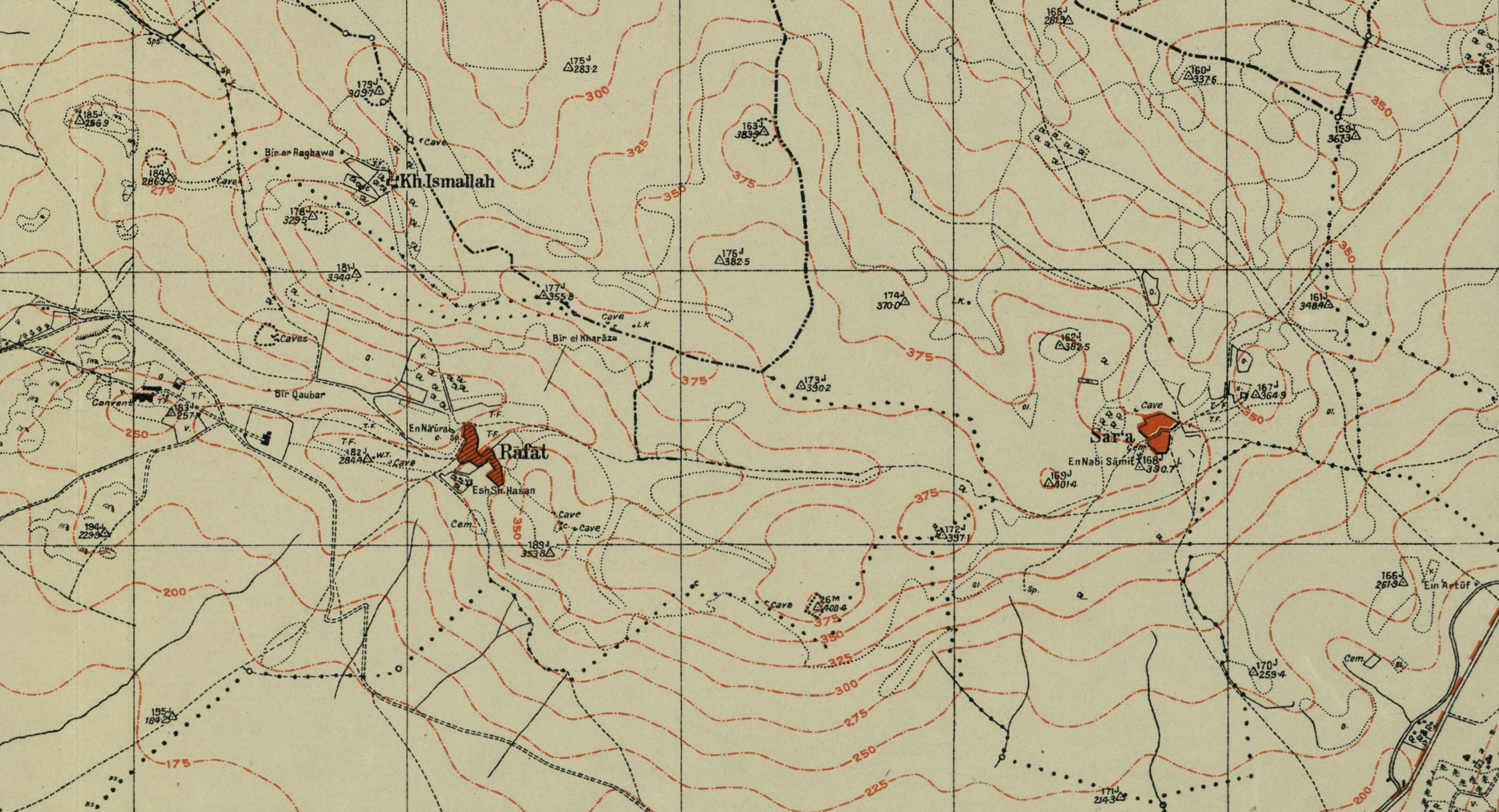
Sar'a 1942 1:20,000

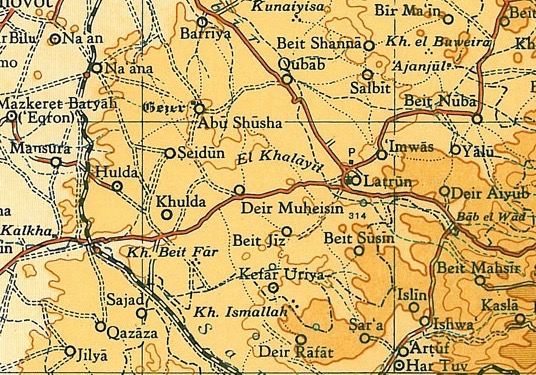
Sar'a 1945 1:250,000

=== 1948 war ===
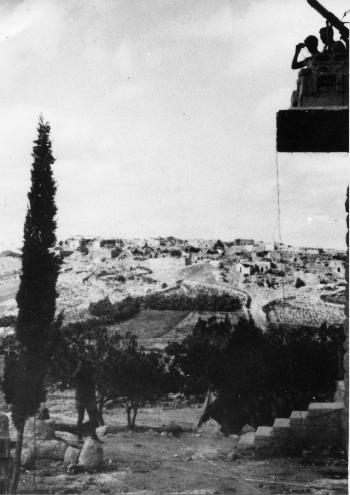
Sar'a 1948.Members of the Harel Brigade standing on the balcony of the mukhtar's house

Sar'a was captured by Israel's Harel Brigade on July 13–14, 1948, during the offensive Operation Dani in the 1948 Arab-Israeli War. Many of the inhabitants had already fled, as the village had been on the front lines since April. Those who had remained fled when the mortar barrages from the approaching Harel columns began; the few that stayed throughout the assault were later expelled. The village's inhabitants fled the village towards various West Bank refugee camps, including Qalandiya.

=== Israel ===
Following the war, the area was incorporated into the State of Israel. The moshav of Tarum was established on the north-eastern part of Sar'a's land in 1950, while Tzora was established about 2 km southwest of the site, on land belonging to Dayr Aban.

According to the Palestinian historian Walid Khalidi, the remaining structures on village land in 1992 were:

Stone rubble and iron girders are strewn among the trees on the site. A flat stone, surrounded by debris and inscribed with Arabic verses from the Qur'an, bears the date A.H. 1355 (1936). On the western edge of the site stands a shrine containing the tombs of two local religious teachers. A valley to the northeast is covered with fig, almond, and cypress trees.

In the 1990s the "Har Tuv Industrial park" was built, on the land that was used by the village for cereals framing, in the valley on the south east of the built-up area of the village. The Industrial park has since expanded, with a large IKEA superstore opening in 2020, and an Amazon Web Services data center due to open in 2023. During the development work in the area, several Archaeological excavations took place, and finds were uncovered, from prehistoric and protohistoric periods to the Ottoman period, confirming that human settlement in the Sar'a Tell began in the pre-Ceramic Neolithic II period, and dates to about 9000 BC and continued, more or less continuously, from then until the demolition of the village in 1949.

In 2015, the Israeli documentarist Michael Kaminer, an inhabitant of Tzora, created the film Sar'a, in which he tracks his own journey of discovering and confronting the fact that his Kibbutz was built upon the ruins of the Palestinian village.

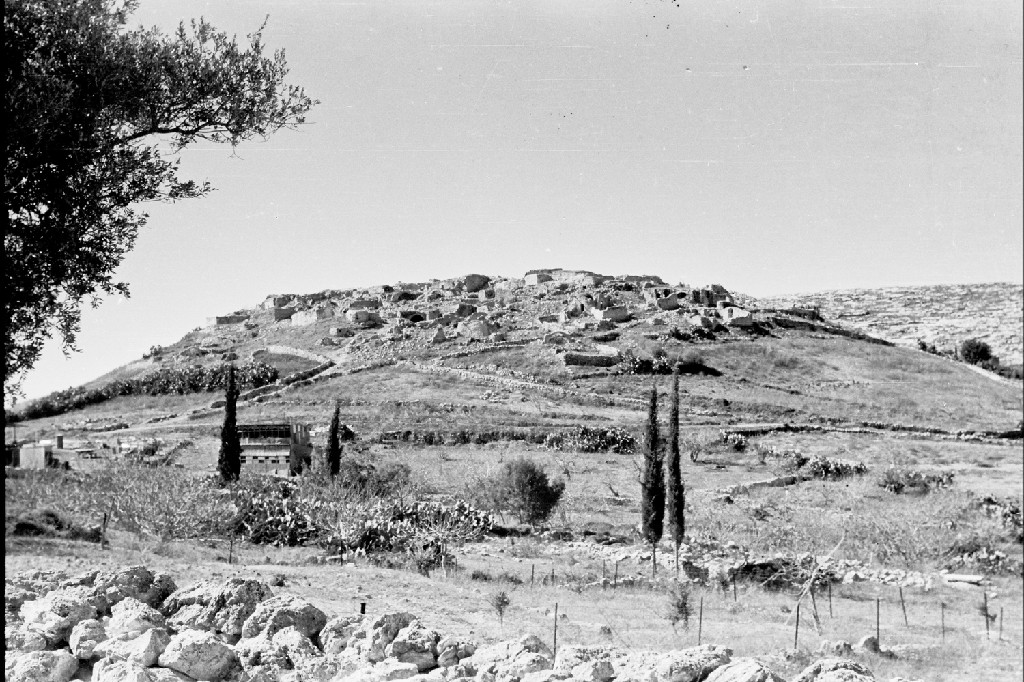
The remains of Sar'a village in 1949

== Landmarks ==
Sar'a had two shrines, one of which is still standing. The first one, destroyed in the 1950s, belonged to al-Nabi Samat, and the other for an unknown individual.

The village has several khirbas (ruined former settlements) including Khirbat al-Tahuna, where the ruins of a building constructed of ashlars (squared stone masonry) and the foundations of other buildings.

== See also ==
- Depopulated Palestinian locations in Israel

== Bibliography ==
- Barron, J. B., ed. (1923). Palestine: Report and General Abstracts of the Census of 1922. Government of Palestine.
- Betzer, Pablo (2010-05-23). "Tel Zor'a (North)" (122). Hadashot Arkheologiyot – Excavations and Surveys in Israel.
- Benveniśtî, M. (2000). Sacred landscape: the buried history of the Holy Land since 1948. University of California Press. ISBN 978-0-520-23422-2. (p. 334)
- Conder, C.R. (1879). Tent Work in Palestine - A Record of Discovery and Adventure. Vol. 1. London: Richard Bentley & Son.
- Conder, C.R.; Kitchener, H. H. (1883). The Survey of Western Palestine: Memoirs of the Topography, Orography, Hydrography, and Archaeology. Vol. 3. London: Committee of the Palestine Exploration Fund.
- Dauphin, C. (1998). La Palestine byzantine, Peuplement et Populations. BAR International Series 726 (in French). Vol. III : Catalogue. Oxford: Archeopress. ISBN 0-860549-05-4. (p. 904)
- Department of Statistics (1945). Village Statistics, April, 1945. Government of Palestine.
- Guérin, V. (1869). Description Géographique Historique et Archéologique de la Palestine (in French). Vol. 1: Judee, pt. 2. Paris: L'Imprimerie Nationale.
- Guérin, V. (1869). Description Géographique Historique et Archéologique de la Palestine (in French). Vol. 1: Judee, pt. 3. Paris: L'Imprimerie Nationale.
- Geikie, J.C. (1888). The Holy Land and the Bible. Vol. 1. New York: John B. Alden.
- Hadawi, S. (1970). Village Statistics of 1945: A Classification of Land and Area ownership in Palestine. Palestine Liberation Organization Research Center.
- Hartmann, M. (1883). "Die Ortschaftenliste des Liwa Jerusalem in dem türkischen Staatskalender für Syrien auf das Jahr 1288 der Flucht (1871)". Zeitschrift des Deutschen Palästina-Vereins. 6: 102–149.
- Hütteroth, W.-D.; Abdulfattah, K. (1977). Historical Geography of Palestine, Transjordan and Southern Syria in the Late 16th Century. Erlanger Geographische Arbeiten, Sonderband 5. Erlangen, Germany: Vorstand der Fränkischen Geographischen Gesellschaft. ISBN 3-920405-41-2.
- Khalidi, W. (1992). All That Remains: The Palestinian Villages Occupied and Depopulated by Israel in 1948. Washington D.C.: Institute for Palestine Studies. ISBN 0-88728-224-5.
- McCown, C. C. (1921). "Muslim Shrines in Palestine". The Annual of the American Schools of Oriental Research in Jerusalem. 2/3: 47–79. doi:10.2307/3768451. JSTOR 3768451.
- Mills, E., ed. (1932). Census of Palestine 1931. Population of Villages, Towns and Administrative Areas. Jerusalem: Government of Palestine.
- Morris, B. (2004). The Birth of the Palestinian Refugee Problem Revisited. Cambridge University Press. ISBN 978-0-521-00967-6.
- Nagorsky, Alla (2012-04-16). "Tel Zor'a, Forest Survey" (124). Hadashot Arkheologiyot – Excavations and Surveys in Israel.
- Palmer, E. H. (1881). The Survey of Western Palestine: Arabic and English Name Lists Collected During the Survey by Lieutenants Conder and Kitchener, R. E. Transliterated and Explained by E.H. Palmer. Committee of the Palestine Exploration Fund.
- Quarterly statement - Palestine Exploration Fund Volume: 7-8 (1875): ( p. 211 )
- Robinson, E.; Smith, E. (1841). Biblical Researches in Palestine, Mount Sinai and Arabia Petraea: A Journal of Travels in the year 1838. Vol. 2. Boston: Crocker & Brewster. (pp. 339, 343, 365 )
- Robinson, E.; Smith, E. (1841). Biblical Researches in Palestine, Mount Sinai and Arabia Petraea: A Journal of Travels in the year 1838. Vol. 3. Boston: Crocker & Brewster. (p. 18 )
- Robinson, E.; Smith, E. (1856). Later Biblical Researches in Palestine and adjacent regions: A Journal of Travels in the year 1852. London: John Murray.
- Schick, C. (1896). "Zur Einwohnerzahl des Bezirks Jerusalem". Zeitschrift des Deutschen Palästina-Vereins. 19: 120–127.
- Socin, A. (1879). "Alphabetisches Verzeichniss von Ortschaften des Paschalik Jerusalem". Zeitschrift des Deutschen Palästina-Vereins. 2: 135–163.
- Warren, C.; Conder, C.R. (1884). The Survey of Western Palestine: Jerusalem. London: Committee of the Palestine Exploration Fund. (p. 444)
