= Ta'oz =

Ta'oz: תָּעוֹז (Hebrew)
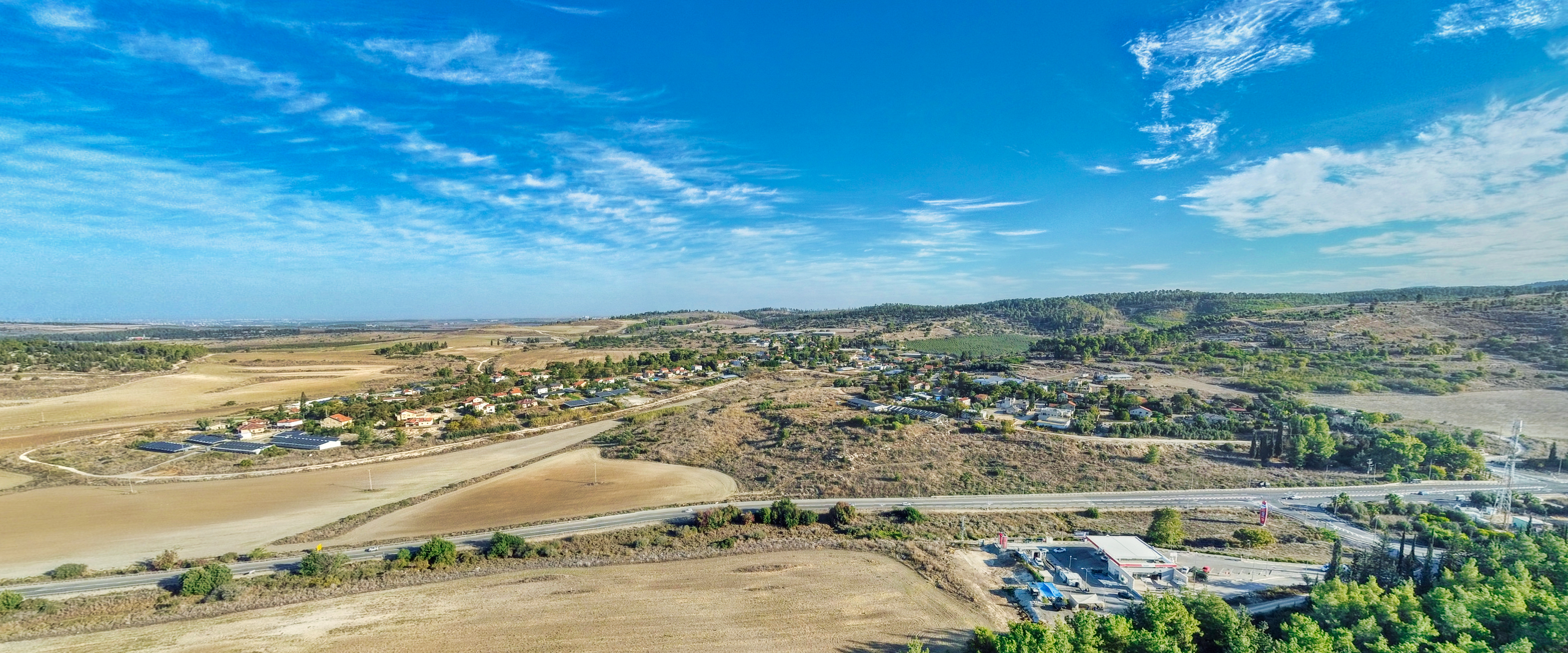

- Location within Jerusalem District
- Coordinates: 31°48′7″N 34°58′33″E
- Country: Israel
- District: Jerusalem
- Council: Mateh Yehuda
- Affiliation: Hapoel HaMizrachi
- Founded: 1950
- Founder: Yemenite Jews
- Population (2024): 680

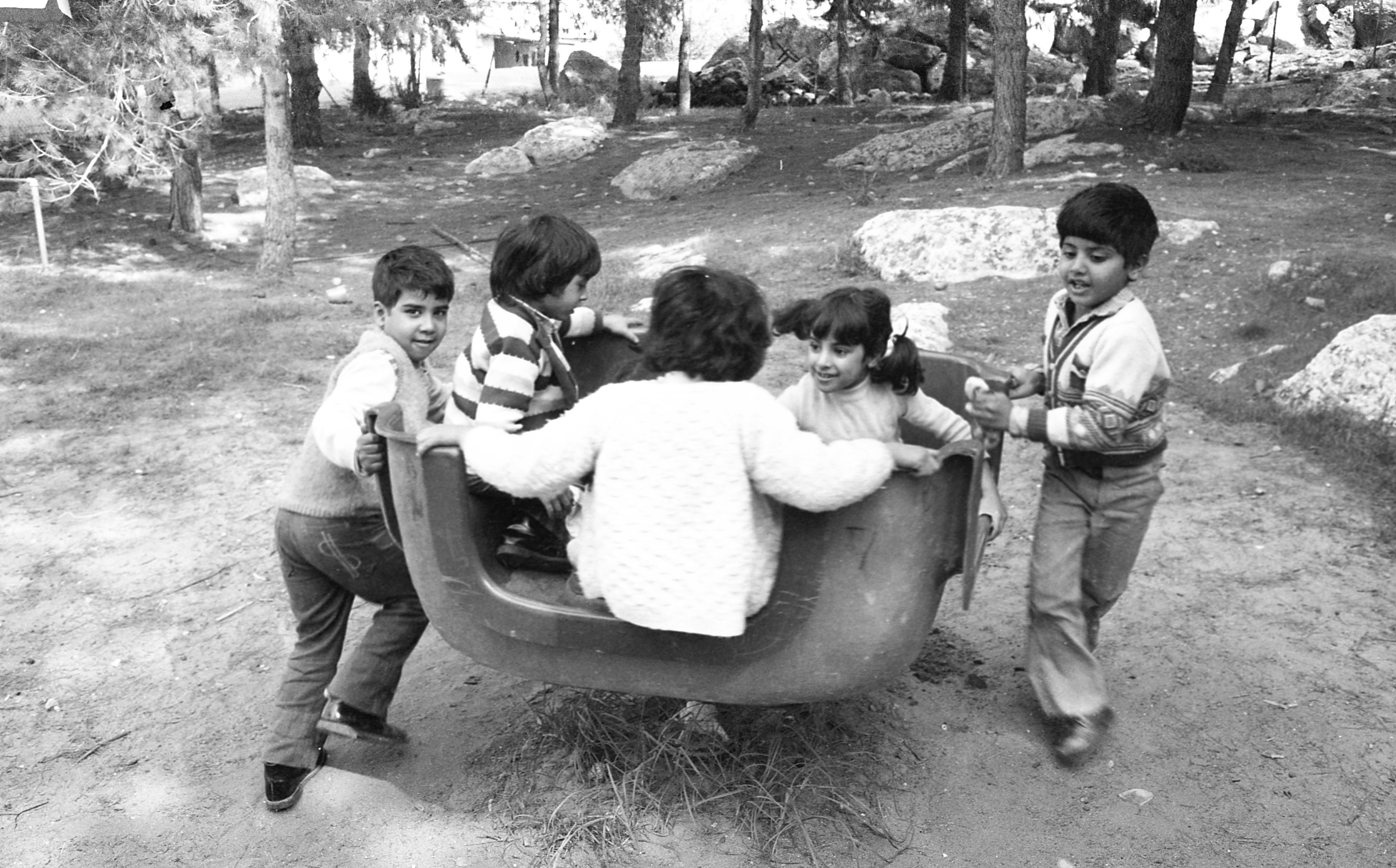
Children playing in Ta'oz in 1969

Ta'oz (Hebrew: תָּעוֹז, lit. 'Stronghold') is a moshav in central Israel. Located to the northwest of Beit Shemesh with an area of 1,500 dunams, it falls under the jurisdiction of Mateh Yehuda Regional Council. In 2024 it had a population of 680.

== History ==
The village was established in 1950 by immigrants from Yemen. When the majority of these abandoned the village on account of security reasons, the village absorbed immigrants from Cochin, which now make-up the majority of its residents. Its name is taken from Psalms 89:14 as the name of neighbouring moshav Tarum;

Thine is an arm with might; strong is Thy hand, and exalted is Thy right hand.
