= Tzora =

Tzora: צרעה (Hebrew)
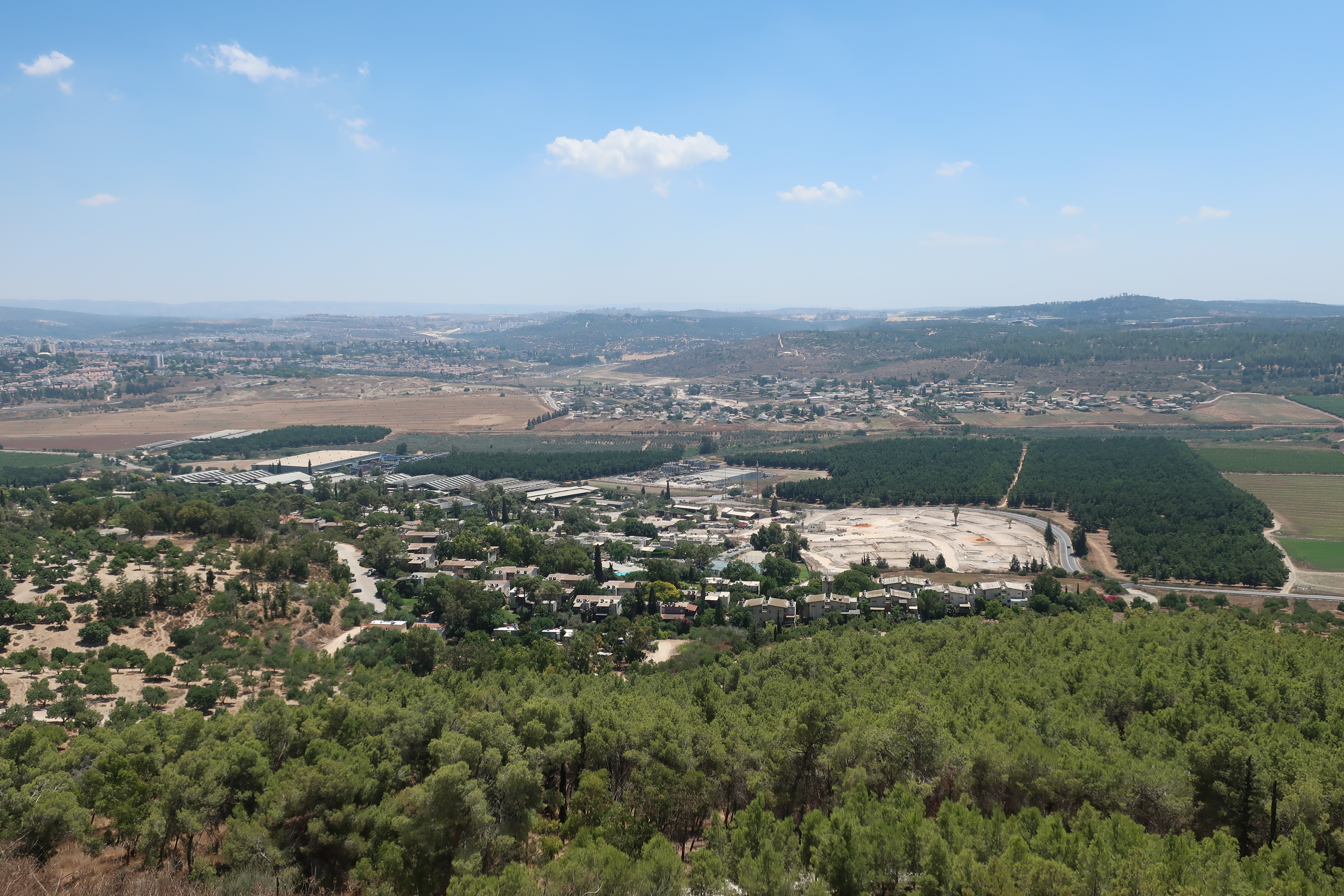

- Location within Jerusalem District Location within Israel
- Coordinates: 31°45′43″N 34°58′0″E
- Country: Israel
- District: Jerusalem
- Council: Mateh Yehuda
- Affiliation: Kibbutz Movement
- Founded: 1948
- Founder: Former Palmach Members
- Population (2024): 934
- Website: www.tzora.co.il

Tzora (Hebrew: צרעה, lit. 'Zorah') is a kibbutz in central Israel. Located about 20 km from Jerusalem, near the city of Beit Shemesh, it falls under the jurisdiction of Mateh Yehuda Regional Council. In 2024 it had a population of 934.

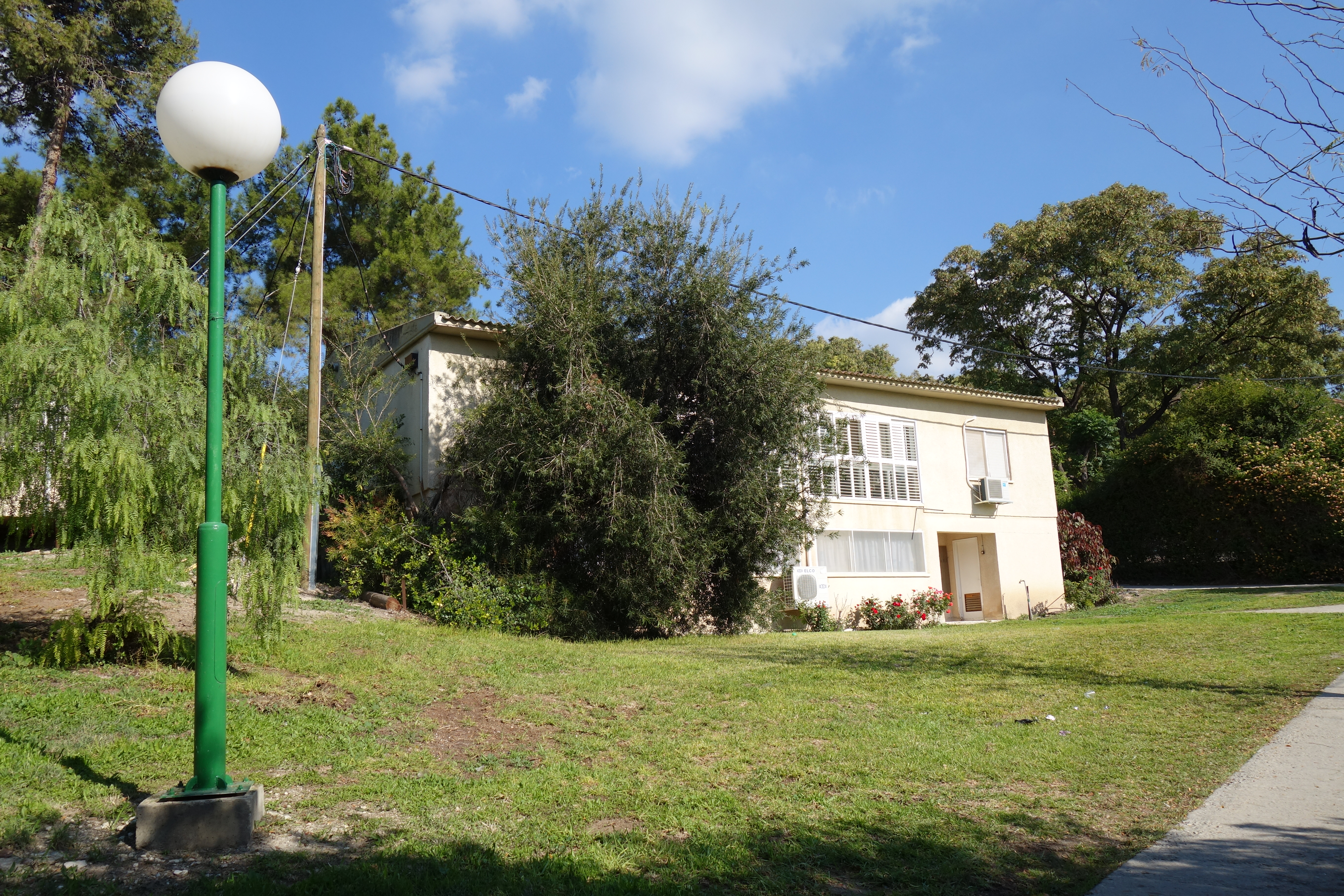
House in Tzora

== Etymology ==
The kibbutz is named for the biblical village of Tzora, which may have been a Canaanite town. The name was taken from the Biblical Book of Judges (13:25): "And the spirit of the Lord began to move him (Samson) at times in the camp of Dan between Zorah and Eshtaol."

The kibbutz's name is also similar to, and is related to, that of the nearby depopulated Palestinian village of Sar'a.

== History ==
=== Biblical era ===
Tzora is located about 2 km south-west of Tel Tzora, which is where the Palestinian village of Sar'a stood until it was depopulated during the 1948 Arab-Israeli War. Tel Tzora is the likely location of the biblical village of Zorah.

=== Second Temple era ===
A ritual bath dating back to the Second Temple Period was discovered near Tzora kibbutz during an archaeological excavation conducted by the Israel Antiquities Authority in 2011.

=== Modern era ===
The kibbutz was founded in December 1948 by former Palmach members. It is located on the land of the depopulated Palestinian village of Dayr Aban.

In the 1980s a ham radio club operated under the call 4Z4YJ. In the early 2000s, Tzora underwent a privatization of its communal living structure, with a community tax levied on income and the residual retained as income by members. In April 2008, the kibbutz was fully privatized.

== Economy ==
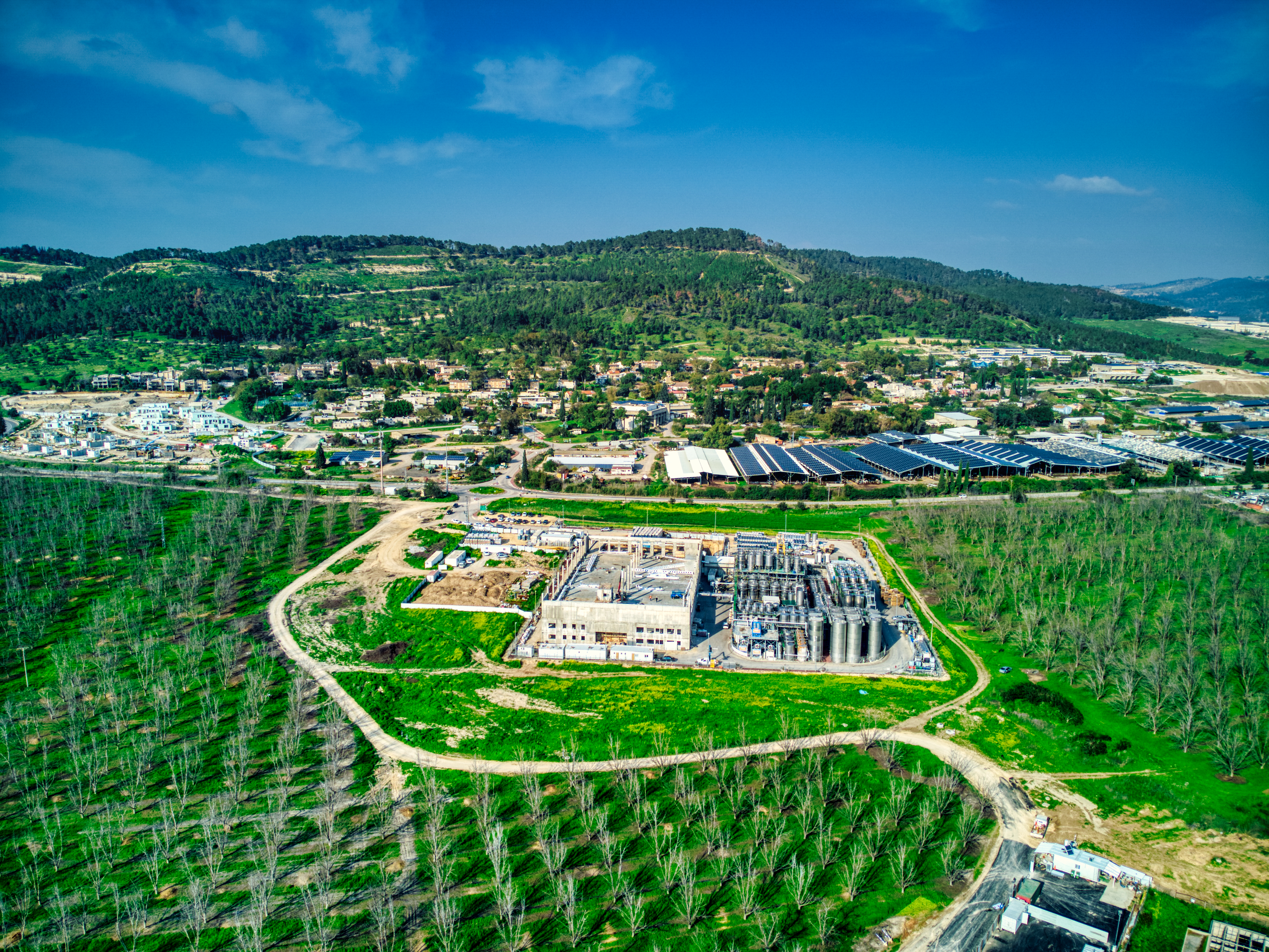
Tzora kibbutz and Teperberg 1870 Winery

One of the main branches of the kibbutz economy was Tzora Furniture Ltd., which began in 1957 as a metal factory. At first, the company produced bicycles, but in 1974 it began to manufacture office chairs, before moving on to a full range of office furniture. However, the factory burned down in July 2007. In 1993, Tzora opened the first kibbutz winery, Tzora Vineyards, which produces 80,000 bottles of wine a year, of which 15,000 are exported. Tzora is also home to the Teperberg Winery. Tzora operates a dairy in partnership with Tzova and Netiv HaLamed-Heh. Tzora Active Systems produce advanced lightweight wheelchairs.

== Notable people ==
- Samson
- Moshe Harif
- Yair Tzaban
- Eliezer Schweid

== Gallery ==
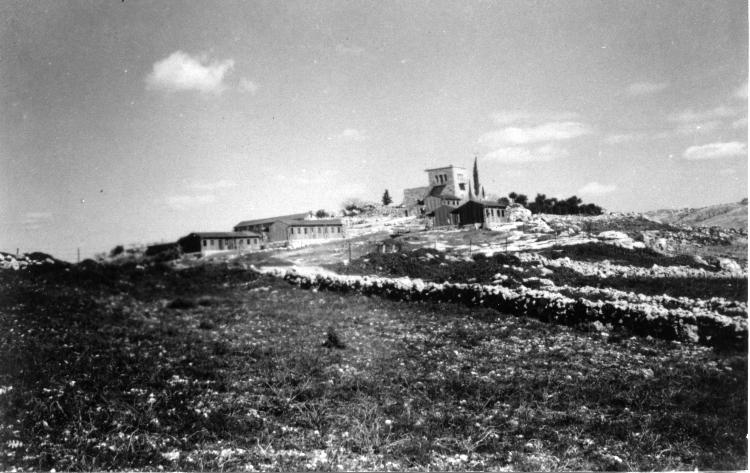
View of fledgling kibbutz from the road to Jerusalem

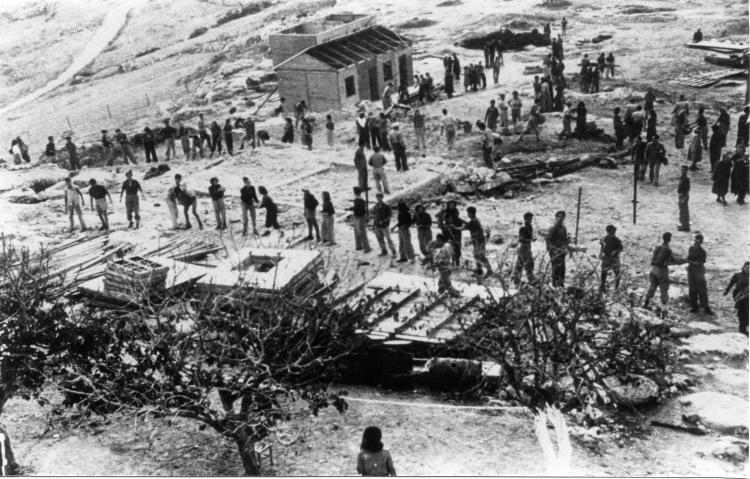
Construction of first cabins, 1948

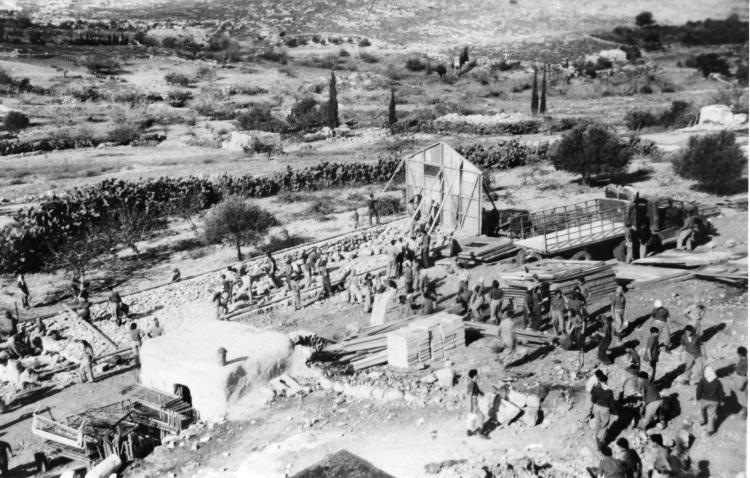
First buildings, 1948

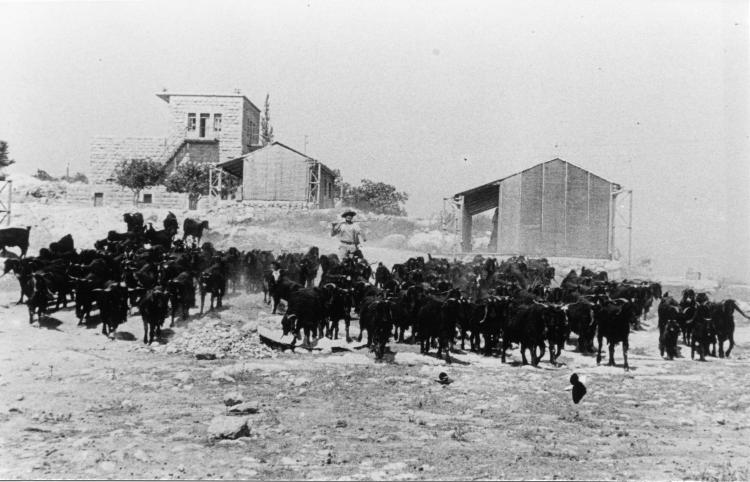
Kibbutz goat herd in its early days

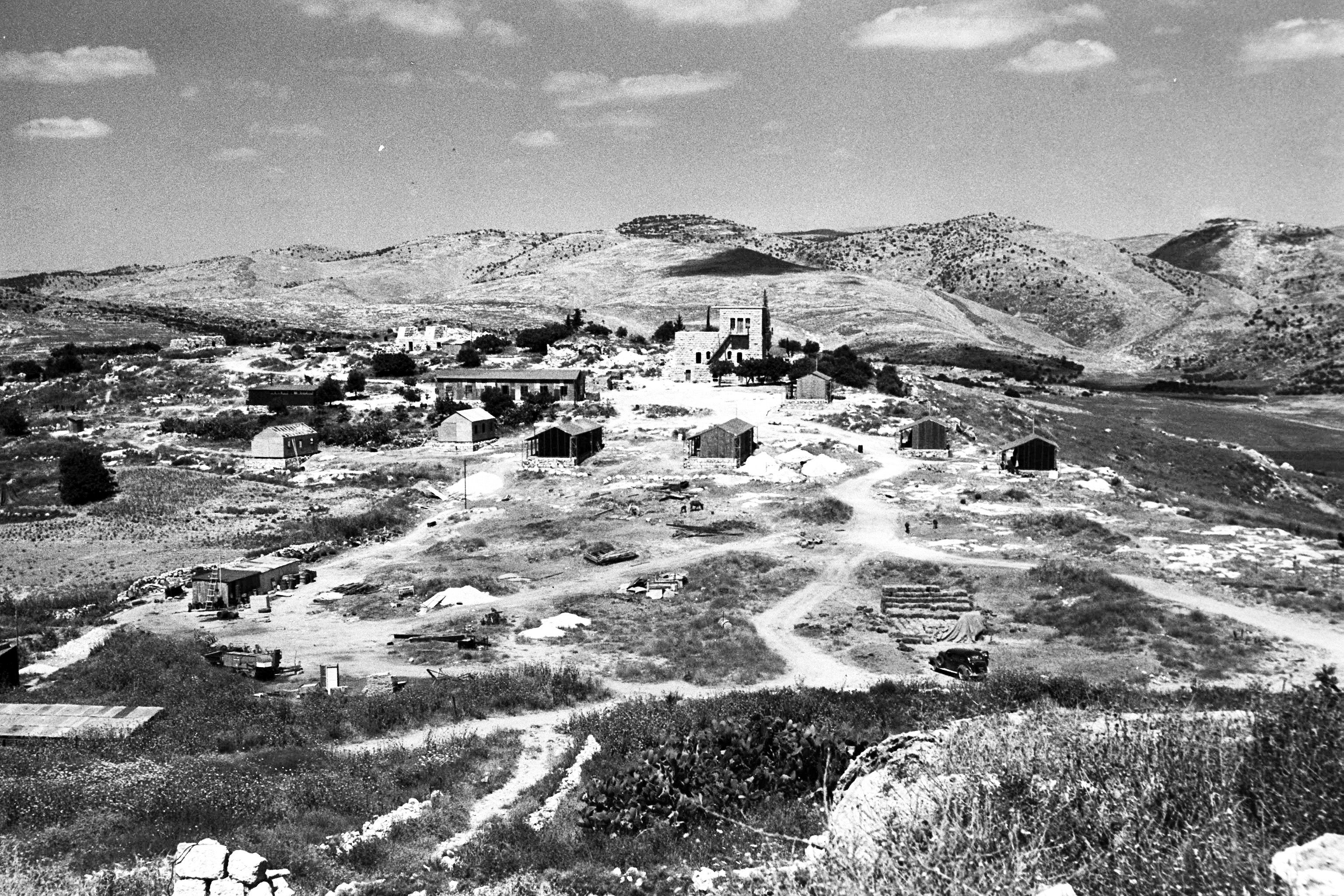
Tzora 1949
