= Eshtaol =

Eshtaol: אֶשְׁתָּאוֹל (Hebrew)
- Moshav
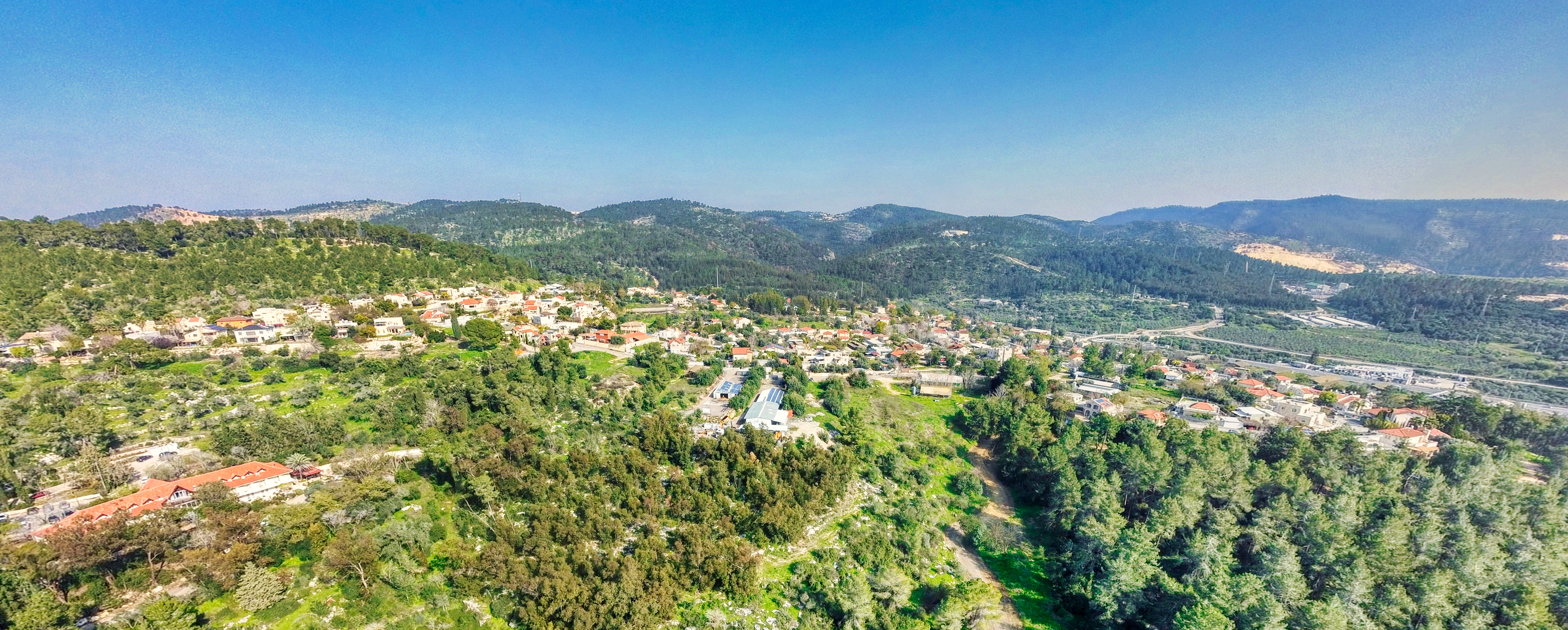

- Location within Jerusalem District Location within Israel
- Coordinates: 31°46′52″N 35°0′36″E
- Country: Israel
- District: Jerusalem
- Council: Mateh Yehuda
- Affiliation: Kibbutz Movement
- Founded: 8000 BCE (Earliest settlement); 1200 BCE (Israelite settlement); 1600s or earlier (Arab village); 1949 (Israeli moshav)
- Population (2024): 1,112
- Website: www.eshtaol.org.il

Eshtaol (Hebrew: אֶשְׁתָּאוֹל) is a moshav in central Israel, and a biblical location mentioned in the Books of Joshua and Judges and in the first Book of Chronicles. Located 6 km (4 mi) north of the city of Beit Shemesh, it falls under the jurisdiction of Mateh Yehuda Regional Council. In 2024, it had a population of 1,112.

== Hebrew Bible ==
Eshtaol was in the territory allotted to the Tribe of Dan (Joshua 19:41), and located on the border of the tribe of Judah. Although listed in Joshua 15:33 as being a city in the plain, it is actually partly in the hill country, partly in the plain. According to the biblical narrative, Samson began to be agitated by the Spirit of God in the locality of Mahaneh Dan (the camp of Dan), the district "between Zorah and Eshtaol" (Judges 13:25). After his death in Gaza, Samson's body was brought back for burial in the tomb of his father Manoah between Eshtaol and Zorah (Judges 16:31). Five scouts from Eshtaol and Zorah were sent out to find a land suitable for the tribe of Dan. (Judges 18:1–29).

== History and archaeology ==
=== Neolithic settlement ===
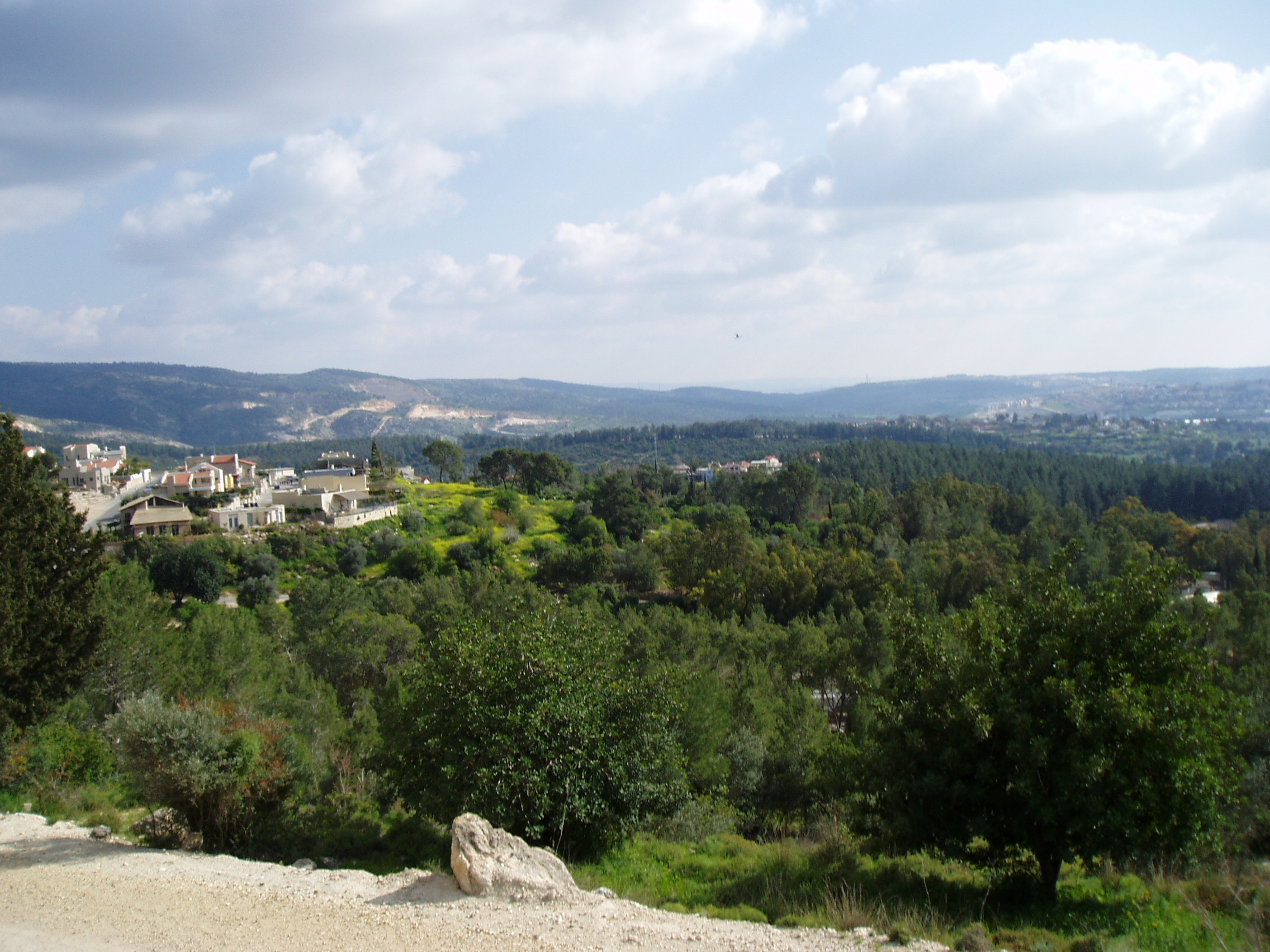
Eshtaol Forest

In 2013, archaeological excavations conducted by the Israel Antiquities Authority near Eshtaol discovered the oldest structure ever found in the Shfela region of the Judean Hills, dating back to the first permanent human settlement in the area some 10,000 years ago. Excavations at the site continued into 2014, led by A. Yaroshevich on behalf of the Israel Antiquities Authority.

=== Modern Eshtaol ===
Eshtaol was founded on the lands of the depopulated Arab villages of Ishwa' and Islin after the 1948 Arab-Israeli War. It was part of a plan to establish villages in the Jerusalem corridor to create a contiguous bloc between the coastal plain and Jerusalem. The first residents were Jewish immigrants from Yemen, who settled there in December 1949. They worked in land reclamation and forestry. The Jewish National Fund (JNF) established a 45-dunam nursery in Eshtaol to supply saplings for JNF forests. Later, the moshav branched out into poultry and other agricultural enterprises. At the end of the 1990s, the moshav absorbed 100 new families.

== Bibliography ==
- Golani, Amir (27 November 2008): Eshta’ol, Hadashot Arkheologiyot – Excavations and Surveys in Israel, No. 120.
- Solimany, Gideon (11/03/2009): Eshta’ol Junction, Hadashot Arkheologiyot – Excavations and Surveys in Israel, No. 121.
- Golani, Amir and Dan Storchan (1 January 2009): Eshta’ol, Hadashot Arkheologiyot – Excavations and Surveys in Israel, No. 121.
- Freikman, Michael (23 July 2010): Eshta’ol, Hadashot Arkheologiyot – Excavations and Surveys in Israel, No. 122.
- Storchan, Dan (20 December 2010): Eshta’ol, Survey of Sha‘ar Ha-Gāy–Hartuv Junctions, Hadashot Arkheologiyot – Excavations and Surveys in Israel, No. 122.
- Storchan, Dan (22 November 2012): Eshta’ol, Hadashot Arkheologiyot – Excavations and Surveys in Israel, No. 124.
