= John Cunningham Geikie =

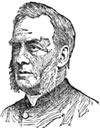

John Cunningham Geikie (Edinburgh, 26 October 1824 – 1 April 1906) was a Scottish-born minister and author. He was primarily active first in Toronto, Canada, and then in England.

== Biography ==
Born in Edinburgh, Scotland, Geikie was the second son of Reverend Archibald Geikie, a Presbyterian Congregationalist minister in Toronto and subsequently at Canaan, Connecticut. Geikie received his early education in Edinburgh, and afterwards studied divinity for four years at Queen's College, Kingston, Ontario. Ordained as a Presbyterian minister in 1848, he began his missionary work in Canada. From 1851 to 1854 he was a Presbyterian minister at Halifax, Nova Scotia. In 1860 he returned to Great Britain and held a Presbyterian charge at Sunderland till 1867, and at Islington Chapel from 1867 to 1873. In 1876 he was ordained deacon in the Church of England and priest next year. He was curate of St. Peter's, Dulwich (1876–79), rector of Christ Church, Neuilly, Paris (1879–81), vicar of St Mary's, Barnstaple (1883–85), and vicar of St Martin at Palace, Norwich (1885–90). In 1871 he was made an Honorary DD of Queen's College, Kingston, Ontario, and in 1891 an Honorary DD from the University of Edinburgh. In 1890 he retired, owing to ill health, to Bournemouth, where he died in 1906. He was buried at Barnstaple.

In 1849, he married Margaret, daughter of David Taylor of Dublin. She survived him with two sons. A daughter, Jeanie, preceded them in death in 1897.

Geikie enjoyed a wide reputation as a writer of popular books on biblical and religious subjects. Charles Spurgeon described him as "one of the best religious writers of the age". His chief writings dealt on orthodox lines with historical and practical rather than with theological themes. His most ambitious work was 'Hours with the Bible, or, the Scriptures in the Light of Modern Discovery and Knowledge' (10 vols. 1881–84; new edit, largely re-written, 12 vols. 1896–97). His 'Life and Words of Christ' (2 vols. 1877; new edit. 1 vol. 1891) reached a circulation of nearly 100,000 copies, and Delitzsch placed the book in 'the highest rank.' He was deeply interested in the exploration of Palestine under the direction of Claude Reignier Conder, and several visits to the country supplied him with material for 'The Holy Land and the Bible: A Book of Scripture Illustrations gathered in Palestine' (2 vols. 1887; abridged edit. 1903).

== Publications ==
Geikie's other works included:

- George Stanley, or Life in the Woods, 1864; 2nd edition 1874.
- Entering on Life, 1870.
- Old Testament Portraits, 1878 (dedicated to his deceased daughter, Jeanie); new edition, entitled Old Testament Characters, 1880; enlarged edition 1884.
- The English Reformation, 1879, a popular history from the ultra-Protestant standpoint which ran through numerous editions.
- The Precious Promises, or Light from Beyond, 1882.
- Geikie, C. (1887). The Holy Land and the Bible. Vol. 2. London: Cassell.
- The Life and Words of Christ, 1887
- Landmarks of Old Testament History, 1894.
- The Vicar and his Friends, 1901.

Geikie was also a voluminous contributor to religious magazines.
