= Islin =

Islin عسلين
- Etymology: Honey
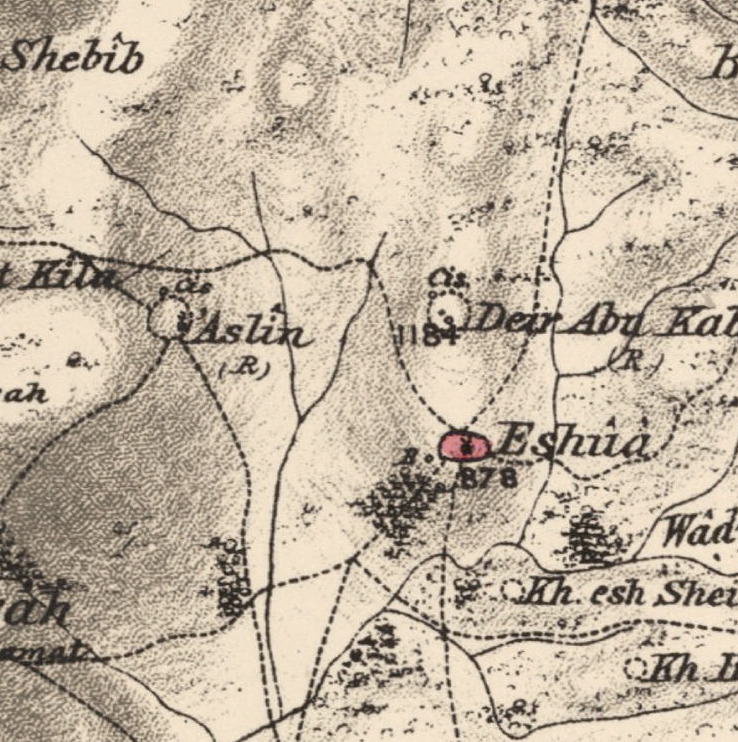
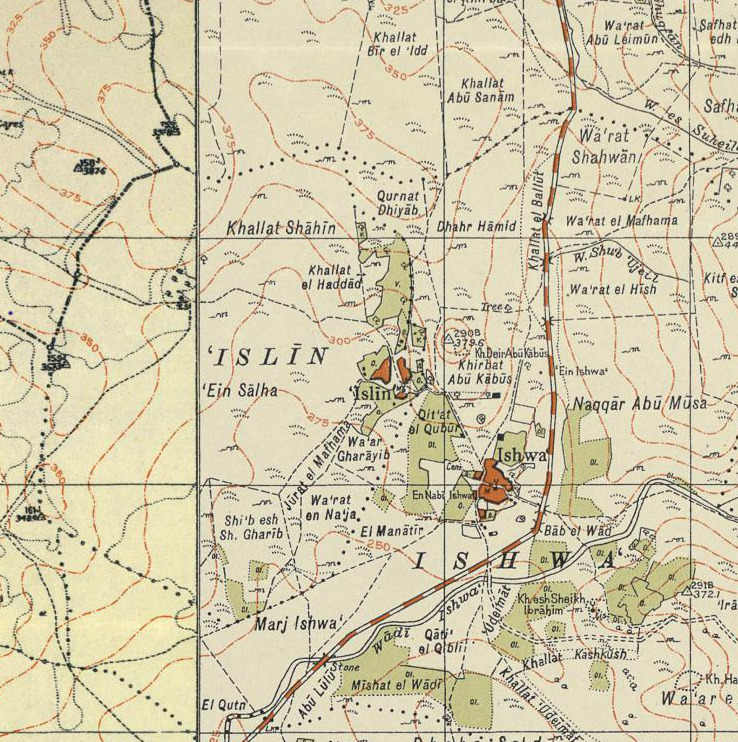
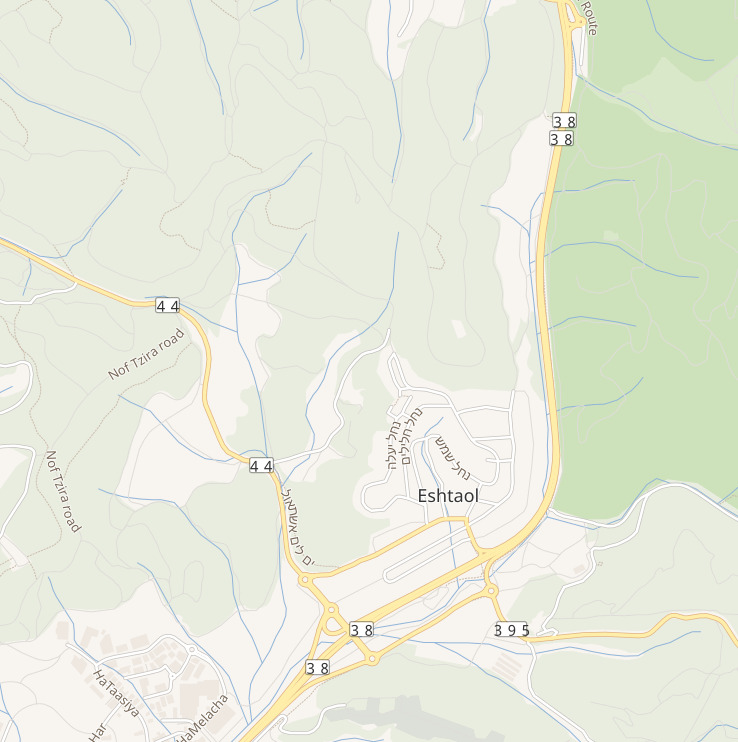
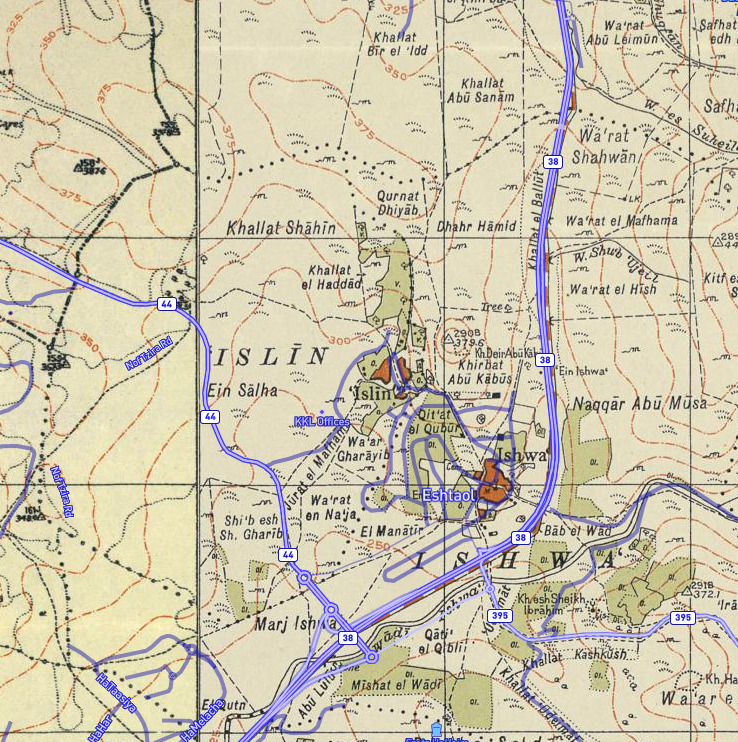
- 1870s map 1940s map modern map 1940s with modern overlay map A series of historical maps of the area around Islin (click the buttons)

- Location within Mandatory Palestine
- Coordinates: 31°47′05″N 35°00′23″E
- Palestine grid: 150/132
- Geopolitical entity: Mandatory Palestine
- Subdistrict: Jerusalem
- Date of depopulation: 18 July 1948

Population (1945)
  - Total: 260
- Cause(s) of depopulation: Military assault by Yishuv forces
- Current Localities: Eshtaol

Islin (Arabic: عسلين) was a Palestinian Arab village located 21 kilometers west of Jerusalem. The village had a population of 302 inhabitants and was depopulated during the 1948 Arab-Israeli war. It was occupied by Israeli forces, possibly from the Fourth Battalion of the Harel Brigade, on 18 July 1948 during Operation Dani, causing its inhabitants to leave. Eshtaol, a moshav, was built on the village's land.

== History ==
In 1596, Islin appeared as Islit in Ottoman tax registers as being in the Nahiya of Ramla of the Liwa of Jaffa. It had a population of 14 Muslim households, an estimated 77 people, who paid a fixed tax-rate of 25% on agricultural products, including wheat, barley, and goats or beehives; a total of 4,700 akçe.

In the later 1870s the place was uninhabited, with ruins of a village still visible, and with a Mukam. It was probably re-established at the beginning of the century.

=== British Mandate era ===
In the 1922 census of Palestine, conducted by the British Mandate authorities, Islin had a population 132, all Muslims, increasing in the 1931 census to 186; in a total of 40 houses.

In the 1945 statistics the population was 260, all Muslims, while the total land area was 2,159 dunams, according to an official land and population survey. Of this, 104 were allocated for plantations and irrigable land, 830 for cereals, while 20 dunams were classified as built-up areas.

=== 1948 Arab–Israeli War and after ===
Islin, along with four other villages, were overtaken by the Israeli Harel Brigade on 17–18 July 1948 in Operation Dani. The villages had been on the front line since April 1948 and most of the inhabitants of these villages had already left the area. Many of those who stayed fled when Israeli forces attacked and the few who remained at each village were expelled.

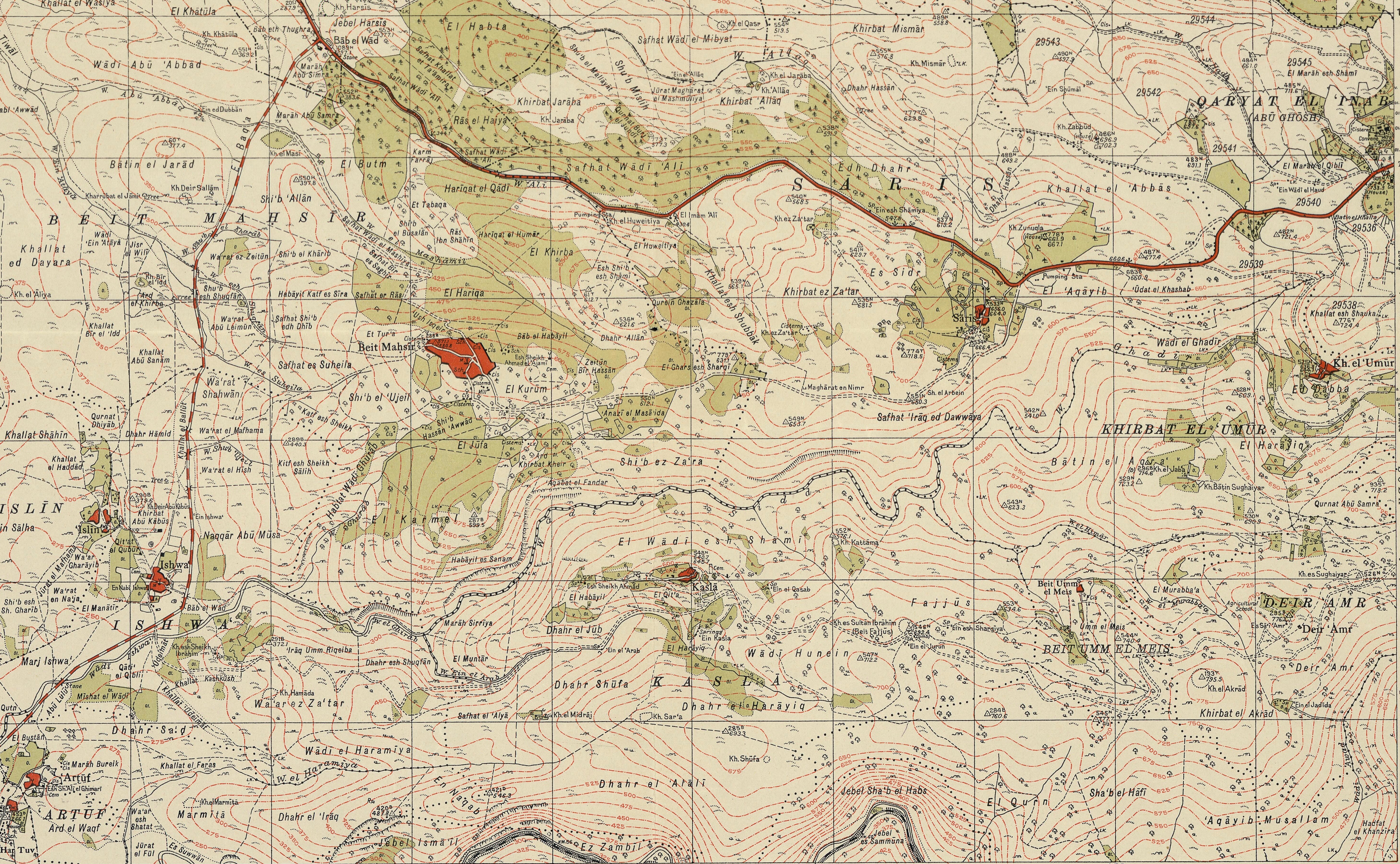
Islin 1943 1:20,000 (left)

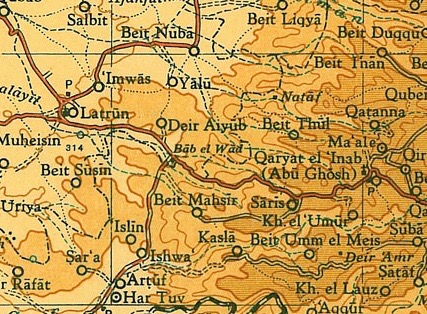
Islin 1945 1:250,000 (lower left quadrant)

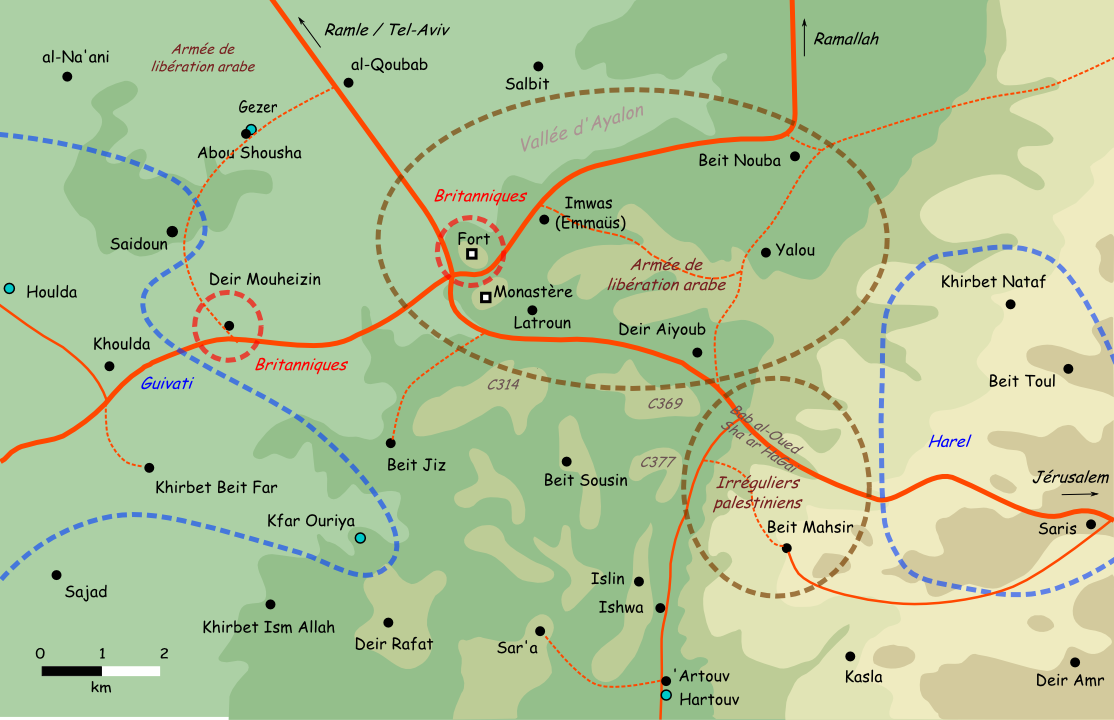
Islin May 10, 1948

Of the site in 1992, Walid Khalidi writes:

"Partially destroyed walls and stone terraces can be seen throughout the site. A thick forest, bushes, and grass grow over and around the stone rubble. Many carob trees and some olive trees grow on the northern edge of the site, and eucalyptus and fir trees grow in the south. The site also houses a bus repair yard belonging to the Israeli public transportation cooperative, Egged."

== See also ==
- Depopulated Palestinian locations in Israel
- List of villages depopulated during the Arab-Israeli conflict

== Bibliography ==
- Barron, J.B., ed. (1923). Palestine: Report and General Abstracts of the Census of 1922. Government of Palestine.
- Conder, C.R.; Kitchener, H.H. (1883). The Survey of Western Palestine: Memoirs of the Topography, Orography, Hydrography, and Archaeology. Vol. 3. London: Committee of the Palestine Exploration Fund.
- Government of Palestine, Department of Statistics (1945). Village Statistics, April, 1945.
- Hadawi, S. (1970). Village Statistics of 1945: A Classification of Land and Area ownership in Palestine. Palestine Liberation Organization Research Center.
- Hütteroth, W.-D.; Abdulfattah, K. (1977). Historical Geography of Palestine, Transjordan and Southern Syria in the Late 16th Century. Erlanger Geographische Arbeiten, Sonderband 5. Erlangen, Germany: Vorstand der Fränkischen Geographischen Gesellschaft. ISBN 3-920405-41-2.
- Khalidi, W. (1992). All That Remains: The Palestinian Villages Occupied and Depopulated by Israel in 1948. Washington D.C.: Institute for Palestine Studies. ISBN 0-88728-224-5.
- Mills, E., ed. (1932). Census of Palestine 1931. Population of Villages, Towns and Administrative Areas. Jerusalem: Government of Palestine.
- Morris, B. (2004). The Birth of the Palestinian Refugee Problem Revisited. Cambridge University Press. ISBN 978-0-521-00967-6.
- Palmer, E.H. (1881). The Survey of Western Palestine: Arabic and English Name Lists Collected During the Survey by Lieutenants Conder and Kitchener, R. E. Transliterated and Explained by E.H. Palmer. Committee of the Palestine Exploration Fund.
