= Zorah =

Ancient town mentioned in the Bible

- צרעה (Hebrew)
- Sarea
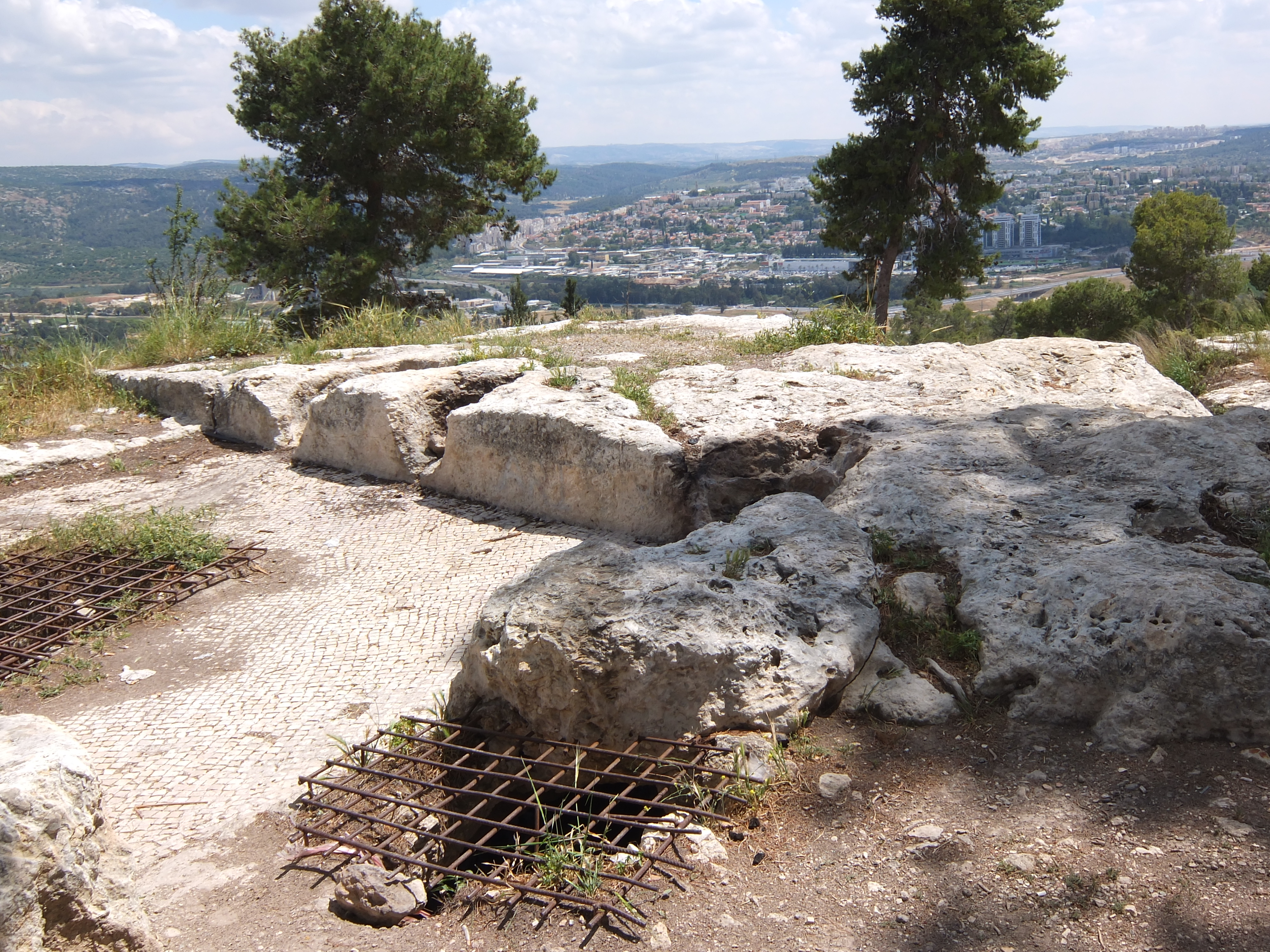
- Mosaic floor at Zorah

- Location within Israel
- 31.775086°N 34.98535°E
- Periods: Late Bronze age
- Cultures: Canaanite, Israelite
- Location: Israel
- Region: Shephelah

Site notes
- Condition: Ruin

Zorah (Hebrew: צרעה) or Tzorah (pronounced [tsoʁˈ(ʔ)a]), was a biblical town in the Judaean Foothills. It has been identified with the former village of Sar'a, now often referred to as Tel Tzora.

== Location ==
Zorah was situated on the crest of a hill overlooking the valley of Sorek. It lies at an elevation of about 1,150 feet (350 m) above sea-level.

It is located 23 kilometers west of Jerusalem near Nahal Sorek.

== History ==
Zorah was mentioned together with Ajalon in the Amarna letters as a city attacked by the Apiru. Zorah has been identified with the biblical Zoreah (Joshua 15:33), and is the birthplace of Samson. Judges 13:2 states:

"there was a certain man from Zorah, of the family of the Danites, whose name was Manoah".

Samson's grave is recorded as being near there (Judges 16:31), and which the historian Josephus says was in a village called Sarasat.

In Joshua 19:41, Zorah is mentioned in the allotment of the Tribe of Judah, on the border with the Tribe of Dan. It was most likely the Danites who occupied Zorah.

According to the Book of Chronicles, it was fortified by Rehoboam (2 Chronicles 11:10).

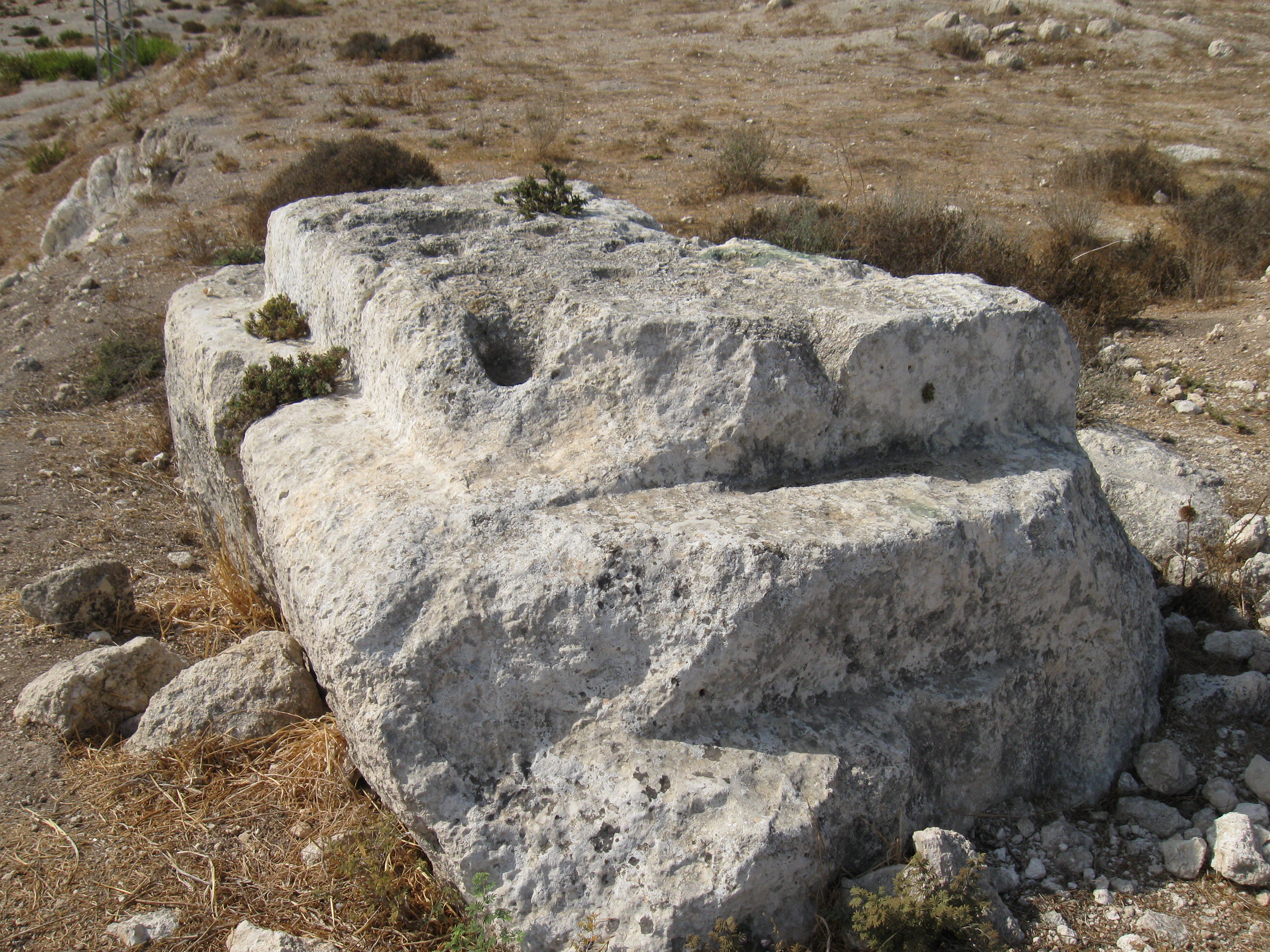
A hewn altar found near the site of Zorah

The Palestinian village Sar'a was located in the presumed location of the ancient town. It was depopulated during the 1948 Arab–Israeli War. Conder and Kitchener, describing the site in 1881, said that, with the exception of the olive groves to the north of the village, the low hill on which the village lies is "bare and white," a place now planted with a pine forest by the Jewish National Fund.

Kibbutz Tzora is now located nearby, at the foot of Zorah mountain, on its southern side.

== Archaeology ==
Caves, tombs, cisterns and a winepress were discovered at Tel Tzora. Two winepresses were carved into the rock, one of which was paved with mosaic.

A rock-hewn altar was found just below the tell. It has been nicknamed "Manoah's Altar", after Samson's father.
