= Etam =

Etam may refer to:

- Etam (biblical figure), several people and places in the Bible
- Etam (biblical town), between Bethlehem and Tekoa
- Etam UK, former British women's clothing retailer
- Etam, West Virginia, an unincorporated community in Preston County, West Virginia
- Rock of Etam, hiding place of Samson

== See also ==
- Etam plc v Rowan, a 1989 UK labour law case
- ETA (m), an armed Basque separatist group
