= Bayt 'Ittab =

Depopulated Palestinian village in Jerusalem

Bayt 'Ittab بيت عطّاب Beit 'Attab, Bait 'Ittab
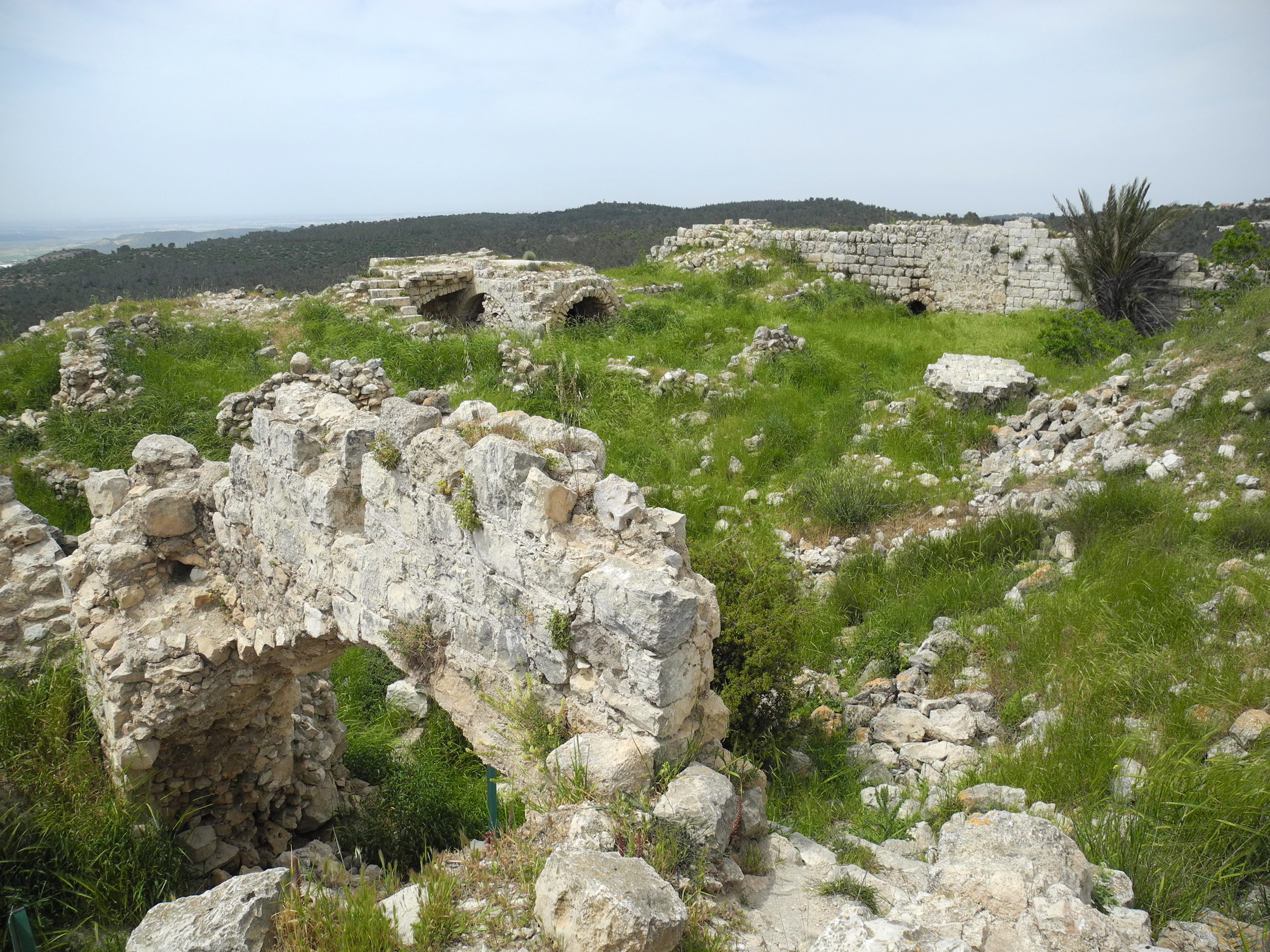
- Bayt 'Ittab
- Etymology: ""House of Attab"
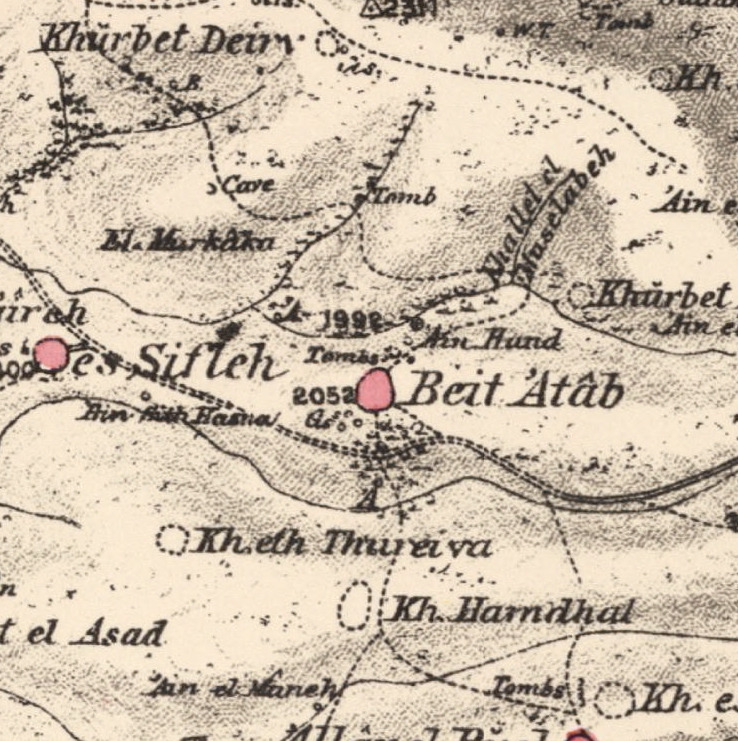
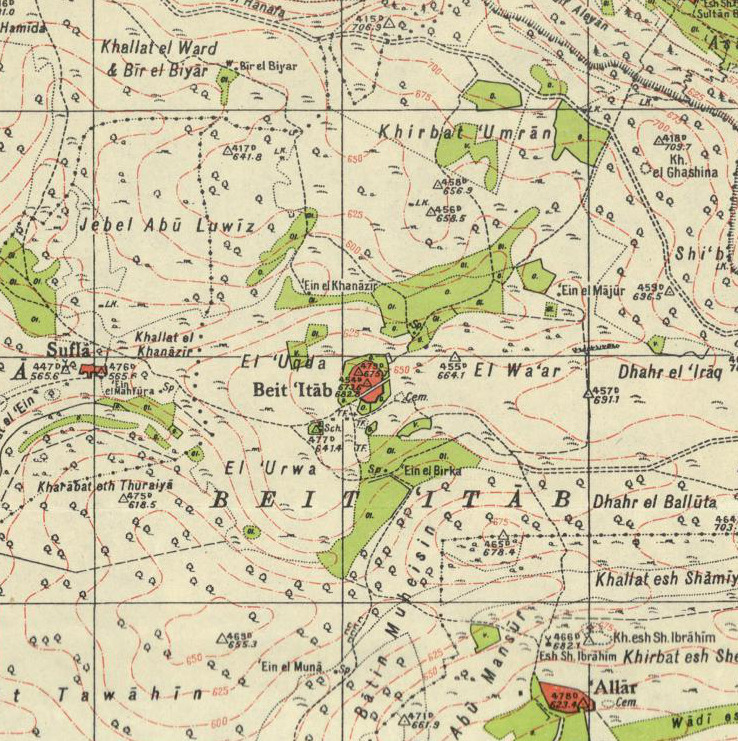
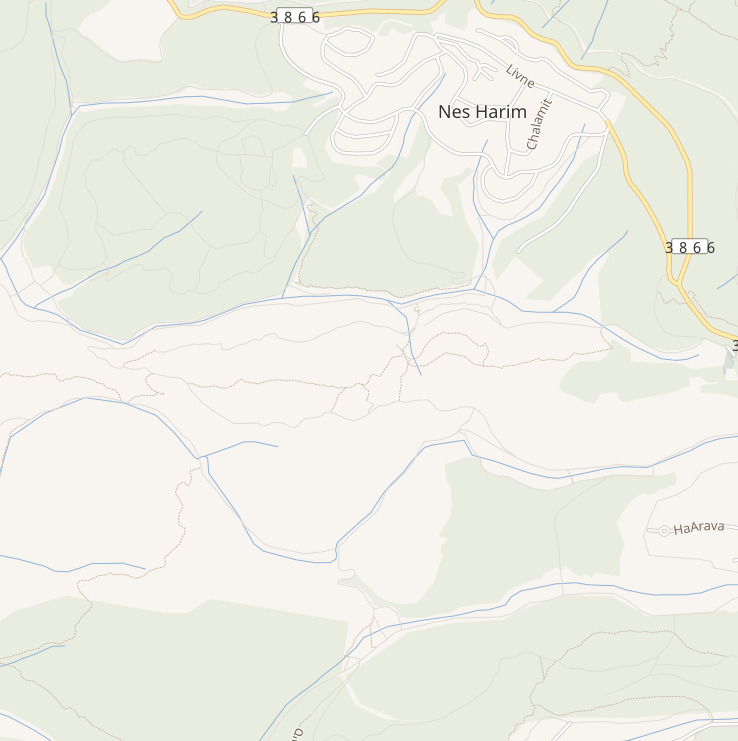
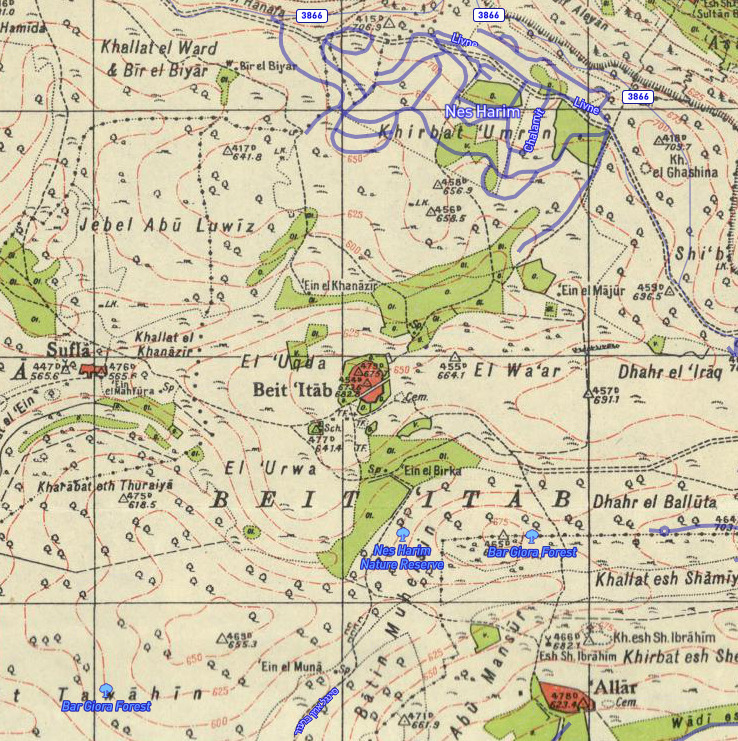
- 1870s map 1940s map modern map 1940s with modern overlay map A series of historical maps of the area around Bayt 'Ittab (click the buttons)

- Location within Mandatory Palestine
- Coordinates: 31°44′06″N 35°03′11″E
- Palestine grid: 155/126
- Geopolitical entity: Mandatory Palestine
- Subdistrict: Jerusalem
- Date of depopulation: 21 October 1948

Area
  - Total: 5,447 dunams (5.447 km^{2}; 2.103 sq mi)

Population (1945)
  - Total: 540
- Cause(s) of depopulation: Military assault by Yishuv forces
- Current Localities: Nes Harim

Bayt ʿIṭṭāb (Arabic: بيت عطاب) was a Palestinian Arab village located in the Jerusalem Subdistrict. Both during and after its incorporation into Crusader fiefdoms in the 12th century, its population was Arab. Sheikhs from the Lahham family clan, who were associated with the Qays tribo-political faction, ruled the village during Ottoman era. In the 19th century, this clan controlled 24 villages in the vicinity. The homes were built of stone. The local farmers cultivated cereals, fruit trees and olive groves and some engaged in livestock breeding.

After a military assault on Bayt ʿIṭṭāb by Israeli forces in October 1948, the village was depopulated and demolished. Many of the villagers had fled to refugee camps in the West Bank less than 20 kilometres (12 mi) from the village. In 1950, an Israeli moshav, Nes Harim, was established north of the built up portion of Bayt 'Itṭab, on an adjacent peak.

== History ==
=== Late Roman Enadab ===
Bayt ʿIṭṭāb is identified with Enadab, a name that appears in Eusebius' Onomasticon, written in the fourth century CE. Agmon conjectured that its ancient name was batˁaṭami = "place of the vulture-goddess shrine", in reference to the Egyptian deity Nekhbet.

=== Crusader period ===
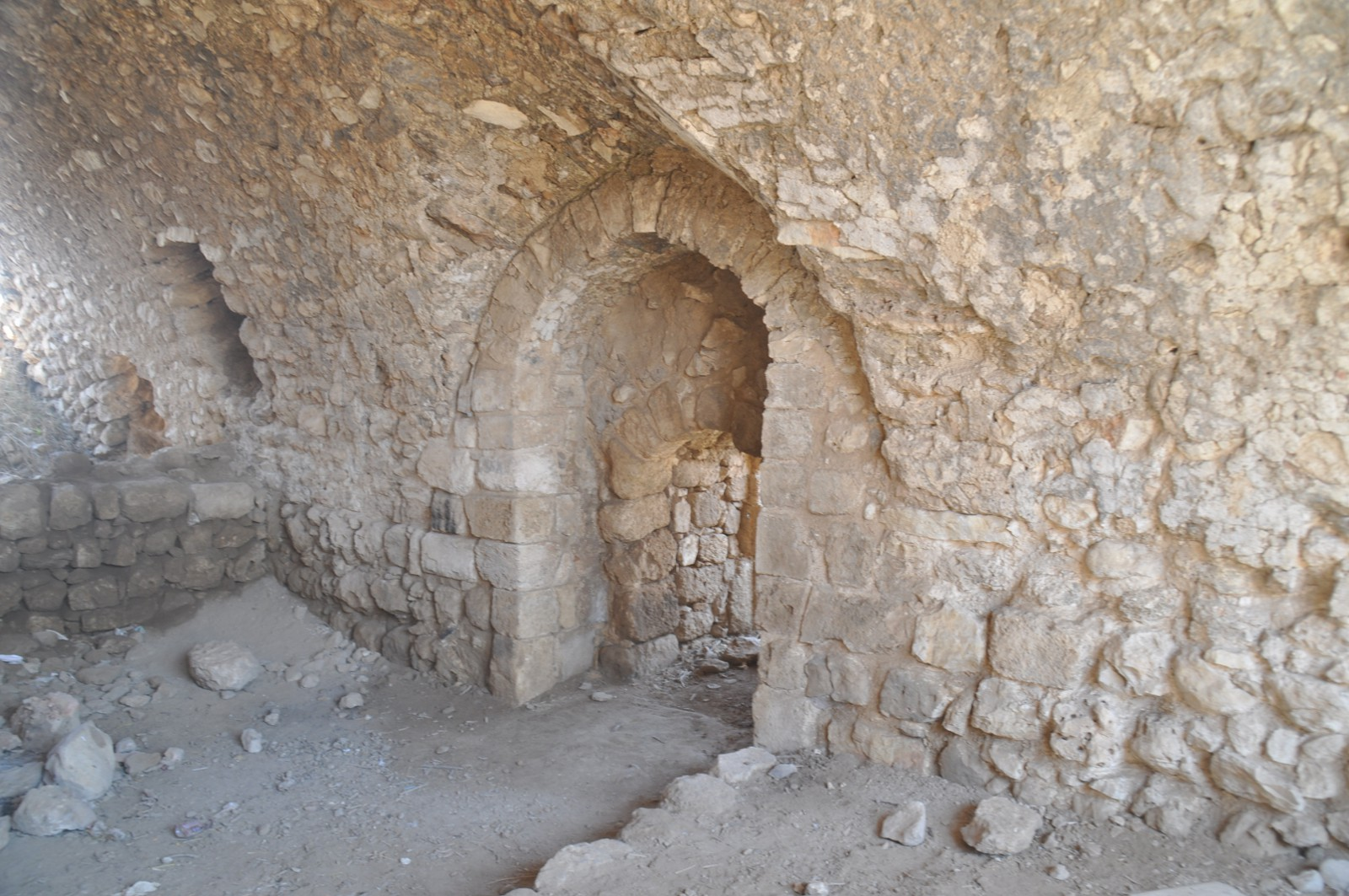
Crusader and Ottoman ruins at Bayt Iṭtab.

In the mid-12th century, Bayt ʿIṭṭāb hosted an impressive maison forte, or fortified hall house, in the ancient centre of the modern village, that is thought to have served as the residence of Johannes Gothman, a Frankish crusader knight. The building had two stories, both vaulted; the ground floor entrance was protected by a slit-machicolation and had stairs leading to the basement and upper floor.

Gothman's wife was forced to sell his landholdings after he was taken prisoner by Islamic forces in 1161, in order to raise the money needed for his ransom. The village was then acquired by and made a fief of the Church of the Holy Sepulchre, possibly organised by the Order of the Holy Sepulchre.

The Arabic name of the village appears in Latin transliteration as Bethaatap in a list recording the 1161 sale of Gothman's land. Its affiliations with the Crusader era has led some to erroneously characterize the village as "Crusader", when in fact its habitation by Arabs predates, persisted through and extended beyond this period.

=== Ottoman period ===
Edward Robinson visited the village in 1838, and described its stone houses, several of which had two storeys, as solidly built. In the center of the village were the ruins of a castle or tower. Robinson estimates, the village population was six to seven hundred people. He notes that Beit 'Atab, as he transcribes it, was the chief town of the 'Arkub (Arqub) district and the Nazir (warden) of the district lived there. Robinson recounts that he was "a good-looking man" from the Lahaam clan, and that when they arrived in the village, he was sitting conversing with other sheikhs on a carpet under a fig tree. Rising to greet them, he invited them to stay for the night, but as they were in a hurry to see more of the country before the setting of the sun, and so declined his offer.

Beit ʿIṭṭāb served as the seat for the ʿArqūb district, a Yemen-affiliated cluster of villages in the Judean Foothills.In the mid-19th century, the sheikh of Bayt 'Iṭṭāb was named 'Uthman al-Lahham. He had been exiled in 1846, but managed to escape and return. A supporter of the Qays faction, Lahham was in conflict with the Yamani faction leaders, especially the sheikh of Abu Ghosh. In the 1850s the conflict between these two families over the control of the district of Bani Hasan dominated the area. As Meron Benvenisti writes, al-Lahham waged "a bloody war against Sheik Mustafa Abu Ghosh, whose capital and fortified seat was in the village of Suba." In 1855, Mohammad Atallah in Bayt Nattif, a cousin of 'Utham al-Lahham, contested his rule over the region. In order to win support from Abu Ghosh, Mohammad Atallah changed side over to the Yamani faction. This is said to have enraged 'Utham al-Lahham. He raised a fighting force and fell on Bayt Nattif on 3 January 1855. The village lost 21 dead. According to an eyewitness description by the horrified British consul, James Finn, their corpses were terribly mutilated.

In February 1855, the Abu Ghosh clan came to the aid of Atallah, conquered Bayt ʿIṭṭāb, and imprisoned ʿUtham al-Laḥḥām in his own house. With the help of one of the younger members of the Abu Ghosh clan, James Finn was able to negotiate a cease-fire between the Atallah and Lahham factions in Bayt 'Iṭṭāb. For three years, relative peace reigned in the area; however, the Ottoman governor of Jerusalem, Thurayya Pasha and his policy of step-by-step consolidation of Ottoman control over the local districts led to the last rebellion of the sheikhs in 1858–59. By the fall of 1859, when 'Utham al-Lahham was ninety years old, both he and Mohammad Atallah were deported to Cyprus by Thurayya Pasha. The rest of the Laḥḥām family was resettled in Ramla.

When French explorer Victor Guérin visited the village in 1863, "he found that the Sheikh's house, with the adjoining houses, is built upon the site of an old fort, some vaults of which remain, and seemed to him older than the Crusades. The people say that there is a subterranean passage from the castle to the spring at the bottom of the hill. They also told him that the village of Eshua (4 miles to the north-west) was formerly called Ashtual, and that between the villages of Sur'ah and Eshua is a waly consecrated to Sheikh Gherib, and known also as the Kabr Shamshun, Tomb of Samson."

An official Ottoman village list from about 1870 cited by Socin shows that Bayt 'Iṭṭāb had a total of 89 houses inhabited by 241 people, with the caveat that the population count included men only.

In the late 19th century, Bayt ʿIṭṭāb was described as a village built on stone, perched on a rocky knoll that rose 60 to 100 feet above the surrounding hilly ridge. Its population in 1875 was approximately 700, all Muslim. Olive trees were cultivated on terraces to the north of the village. A large cavern (18 feet wide and 6 feet high) ran beneath the houses.

According to Hartmann, in 1883 Bayt 'Iṭṭāb had 100 houses. In 1896 the population of Bet 'atab was estimated to be about 543 persons.

=== British Mandatory period ===
In the 1922 census of Palestine conducted by the British Mandate authorities, Bayt 'Itab had a population of 504 residents; all Muslims, increasing in the 1931 census to 606, still all Muslims, in a total of 187 houses. It was in the sub-district of Ramle, but due to the rearrangement of district boundaries it was later in the sub-district of Jerusalem.

The original layout of Bayt ʿIṭṭāb was circular, but newer construction to the southwest (towards Sufla), gave the village an arc-shape. Most houses were built of stone. Agriculture was the main source of income. The village owned extensive areas on the coastal plain that were planted with grain. During the British Mandate in Palestine, some of this land was expropriated to make a large, government-owned woodland.

In the 1945 statistics, it had a population of 540 Muslims, with 5,447 dunums of land. Of this, a total of 1,400 dunams were used for cereals, 665 dunums were irrigated or used for orchards, while 14 dunams were built-up (urban) Arab land. 116 dunums were planted with olive trees, and the villagers also engaged in livestock breeding.

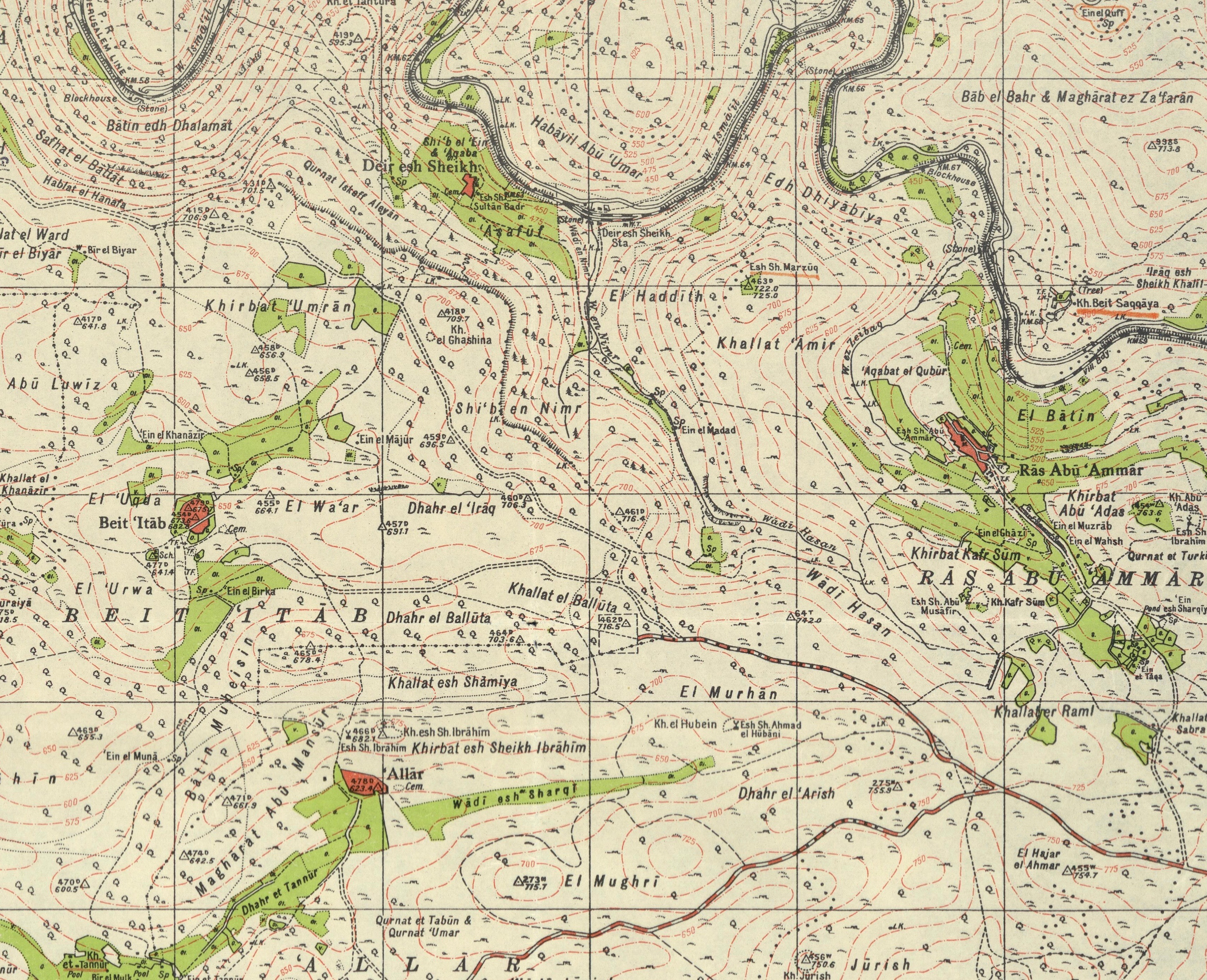
Bayt 'Itab, Mandate survey, 1:20,000

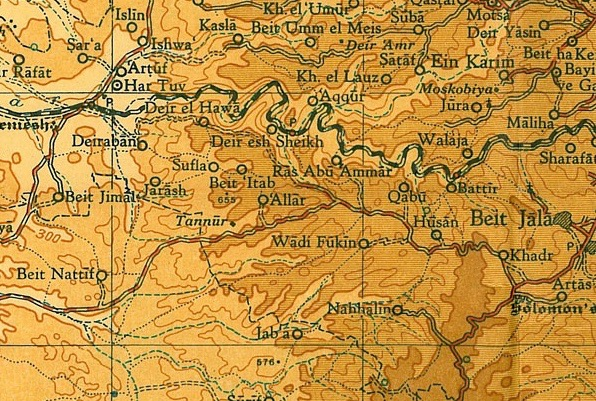
Bayt 'Itab, 1945, 1:20,000

=== 1948 War; Israeli period ===
==== War, depopulation and destruction ====
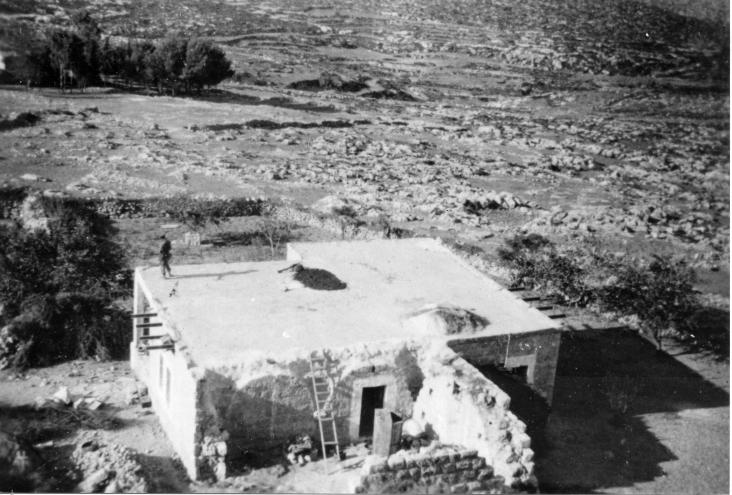
Member of Harel Brigade during demolition of Bayt 'Iṭṭāb, 1948

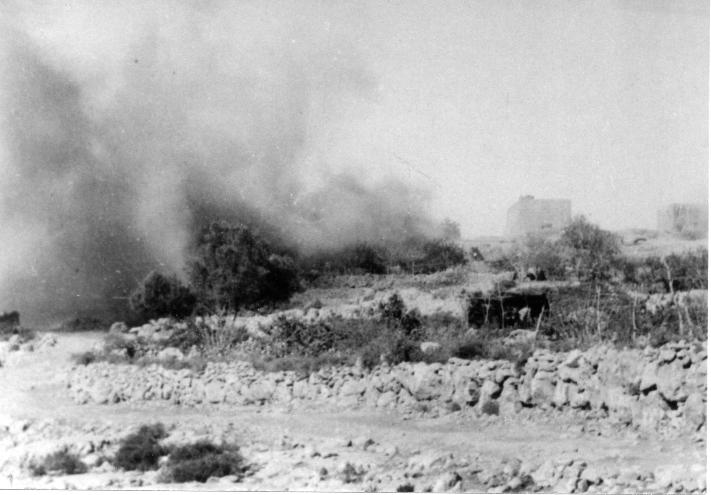
House demolition in Bayt 'Iṭṭā, 1948.

The village was depopulated between 19 and 24 October 1948, after the Harel Brigade captured the village as part of Operation Ha-Har. This operation was complementary to Operation Yoav, a simultaneous offensive on the southern front. One IDF account says that when the Harel Brigade approached the village at night, they already found the village deserted, but proceeded to destroy its houses. Most of the village population fled southwards, towards Bethlehem and Hebron. Many refugees from Bayt 'Iṭṭāb, and other Palestinian villages clustered together on the western slope of the Judean mountains, ended up in Dheisheh refugee camp in the West Bank, roughly 15 kilometres (9.3 mi) from their former homes.

In 1950, the Israeli moshav-type village of Nes Harim was established north of the village site on village land. In 1992, Palestinian historian Walid Khalidi found the site strewn with rubble and the remains of a Crusader fortress. He noted two cemeteries that lay east and west of the village, and the fact that some of the surrounding land was cultivated by Israeli farmers.

==== Archaeological park ====
Remains at the site include a Crusader fortress, vaults, remnants of a wall and towers, tunnels, a columbarium and an olive press. A conservation project was undertaken to stabilize the vaulted building utilizing traditional technology.

== Geography ==
Bayt ʿIṭṭāb was located 17.5 kilometres (10.9 mi) south southwest of Jerusalem, on a high mountain 665 metres (2,182 ft) above sea level, overlooking some lower mountains peaks below. A Roman road ran along a narrow ridge to the south of the village which also passed by Solomon's Pools. A low cliff to the east of the village was known as 'Arâk el-Jemâl ("the cliff, cavern or buttress of the camels").

Southeast of the village on the main road was the chief village spring known as ʿAin Beit ʿAṭāb (Arabic: عين بيت عطاب) or ʿAin Haud. Below this spring to the northwest, was a pool known as Birket 'Atab with its own spring, `Ain el-Birkeh. Another spring nearby was known as 'Ain el Khanzierh ("the spring of the sow"). Connecting the village to the chief spring was a rock tunnel said to be "of great antiquity," the entrance of which was known only to those well acquainted with the site. This cavern or tunnel, known in Arabic as Mgharat Bīr el-Hasuta, ("Cave of the Well of Hasuta") is "evidently artificial," and was hewn into the rock. Some 250 feet long, it runs in a south-south-west direction from the village emerging as a vertical shaft (6 ft x 5 ft x 10 ft deep) about 60 yards away from the spring that supplied the village with water. The average height of the tunnel is about 5 to 8 feet with a width of about 18 feet. There were two entrances to it from the village, one in the west, and the other at the center, the latter being closed at one author's time of writing in the 19th century.

== Biblical identification ==
In 1879, Lieutenant C. R. Conder, of the Palestine Exploration Fund (PEF), thought that the place Bayt ʿIṭṭāb should be identified with the biblical site known as "Rock of Etam" (Judges 15:11), by way of a corruption of its name, and which, according to Conder, was not a town at all, but "a strong rock." John William McGarvey (1881) quotes Conder on the linguistic evidence: "The substitution of B for M is so common (as in Tibneh for Timnah) that the name Atab may very properly represent the Hebrew Etam (eagle's nest); and there are other indications as to the identity of the site."

Survey of Western Palestine (1883), notes that the name of the "curious cave" at Bayt ʿIṭṭāb in Arabic is Bir el-Has Utah. Unable to find a meaning for the word in Arabic, they find it corresponds to the Hebrew word Hasutah, "[...] which is translated 'a place of refuge.' Thus the name seems to indicate that this place has been used from a very early time as a lurking or hiding place, as we gather it to have been in the time of Samson." McGarvey also relays Conder's belief that the cavern within the rock formation was "the real hiding place" of Samson after his destruction of the Philistine's grains.

Henry B. Tristram (1897) writes of Bayt 'Iṭṭāb that it crowned "a remarkable rocky knoll," which he states is, "probably, the Rock Etam." Noting that an ancient tunnel ran down from the village eastward through the rock to the chief spring, he speculates that this would have made a good hiding place for Samson when according to biblical tradition, he "went down and dwelt in the top of the rock Etam" (Book of Judges, xv. 8).

== See also ==
- Depopulated Palestinian locations in Israel
- List of villages depopulated during the Arab-Israeli conflict

== Bibliography ==
- Barron, J. B., ed. (1923). Palestine: Report and General Abstracts of the Census of 1922. Government of Palestine.
- Benvenisti, M. (2002). Sacred Landscape: The Buried History of the Holy Land Since 1948. University of California Press. ISBN 978-0-520-23422-2.
- CRAHM (1994). Château Gaillard études de castellologie médiévale, XVI: actes du colloque international tenu à Luxembourg, 23-29 août, 1992. Publications du CRAHM. ISBN 978-2-902685-03-5.
- Conder, C.R. (1879). Tent Work in Palestine - A Record of Discovery and Adventure. Vol. 1. London: Richard Bentley & Son.
- Conder, C.R. (1878). "The Rock Etam". Quarterly Statement - Palestine Exploration Fund. 10: 116–118.
- Conder, C.R.; Kitchener, H. H. (1883). The Survey of Western Palestine: Memoirs of the Topography, Orography, Hydrography, and Archaeology. Vol. 3. London: Committee of the Palestine Exploration Fund.
- Department of Statistics (1945). Village Statistics, April, 1945. Government of Palestine.
- Finn, J. (1878). E.A.Finn (ed.). Stirring Times, or, Records from Jerusalem Consular Chronicles of 1853 to 1856. Edited and Compiled by His Widow E. A. Finn. With a Preface by the Viscountess Strangford. Vol. 1. London: C.K. Paul & co. (Unhman al-Latham description: p230)
- Finn, J. (1878). E. A. Finn (ed.). Stirring Times, or, Records from Jerusalem Consular Chronicles of 1853 to 1856. Edited and Compiled by His Widow E. A. Finn. With a Preface by the Viscountess Strangford. Vol. 2. London: C.K. Paul & co.(Bayt 'Itab: p.193 ff.)
- Guérin, V. (1869). Description Géographique Historique et Archéologique de la Palestine (in French). Vol. 1: Judee, pt. 2. Paris: L'Imprimerie Nationale.
- Hadawi, S. (1970). Village Statistics of 1945: A Classification of Land and Area ownership in Palestine. Palestine Liberation Organization Research Centre.
- Hartmann, M. (1883). "Die Ortschaftenliste des Liwa Jerusalem in dem türkischen Staatskalender für Syrien auf das Jahr 1288 der Flucht (1871)". Zeitschrift des Deutschen Palästina-Vereins. 6: 102–149.
- Kark, R.; Oren-Nordheim, Michal (2001). Jerusalem and its environs: quarters, neighborhoods, villages, 1800-1948 (Illustrated ed.). Wayne State University Press. ISBN 978-0-8143-2909-2.
- Khalidi, W. (1992). All That Remains: The Palestinian Villages Occupied and Depopulated by Israel in 1948. Washington D.C.: Institute for Palestine Studies. ISBN 0-88728-224-5.
- Levy, T. (1998). The archaeology of society in the Holy Land (2nd illustrated ed.). Continuum International Publishing Group. ISBN 978-0-8264-6996-0.
- Lias (2009). The Book of Judges. BiblioBazaar, LLC. ISBN 978-1-110-82900-2.
- McGarvey, J.W. (2002). Lands of the Bible: A Geographical and Topographical Description of Palestine, with Letters of Travel in Egypt, Syria, Asia Minor, and Greece. Adamant Media Corporation. ISBN 978-1-4021-9277-7.
- Mills, E., ed. (1932). Census of Palestine 1931. Population of Villages, Towns and Administrative Areas. Jerusalem: Government of Palestine.
- Morris, B. (2004). The Birth of the Palestinian Refugee Problem Revisited. Cambridge University Press. ISBN 978-0-521-00967-6.
- Palmer, E. H. (1881). The Survey of Western Palestine: Arabic and English Name Lists Collected During the Survey by Lieutenants Conder and Kitchener, R. E. Transliterated and Explained by E.H. Palmer. Committee of the Palestine Exploration Fund.
- Pringle, D. (1997). Secular buildings in the Crusader Kingdom of Jerusalem: an archaeological Gazetter. Cambridge University Press. ISBN 0521-46010-7.
- Riley-Smith, J. (2001). The Oxford Illustrated History of the Crusades (Illustrated, reissue ed.). Oxford University Press. ISBN 978-0-19-285428-5.
- Robinson, E.; Smith, E. (1841). Biblical Researches in Palestine, Mount Sinai and Arabia Petraea: A Journal of Travels in the year 1838. Vol. 2. Boston: Crocker & Brewster. ( pp. 326, 338-340)
- Rosenfeld, Maya (2004). Confronting the occupation: work, education, and political activism of Palestinian families in a refugee camp (Illustrated ed.). Stanford University Press. ISBN 978-0-8047-4987-9.
- Röhricht, R. (1893). (RRH) Regesta regni Hierosolymitani (MXCVII-MCCXCI) (in Latin). Berlin: Libraria Academica Wageriana.
- de Roziére, ed. (1849). Cartulaire de l'église du Saint Sépulchre de Jérusalem: publié d'après les manuscrits du Vatican (in Latin and French). Paris: Imprimerie nationale. (p. 266: Beitatap(?), p. 279: Betatap)
- Schick, C. (1896). "Zur Einwohnerzahl des Bezirks Jerusalem". Zeitschrift des Deutschen Palästina-Vereins. 19: 120–127.
- Schölch, Alexander (1986): Palästina im Umbruch 1856-1882. Wiesbaden and Stuttgart: Franz Steiner Verlag.
- Schölch, A. (1993). Palestine in Transformation, 1856-1882: Studies in Social, Economic, and Political Development (PDF). Institute for Palestine Studies. ISBN 0-88728-234-2.
- Socin, A. (1879). "Alphabetisches Verzeichniss von Ortschaften des Paschalik Jerusalem". Zeitschrift des Deutschen Palästina-Vereins. 2: 135–163.
- Tristram, H.B. (1897). Bible Places: Or, The Topography of the Holy Land: a Succinct Account of All the Places, Rivers... London: Society for promoting Christian knowledge.
