= Sufla =

Palestinian village, depopulated in 1948

Sufla سفلى
- Former village
- Etymology: the low ground
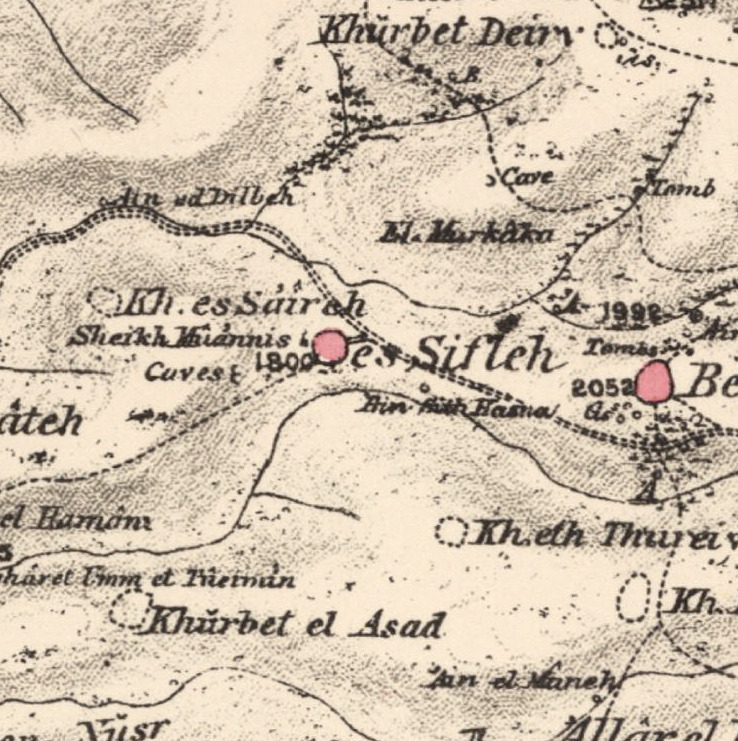
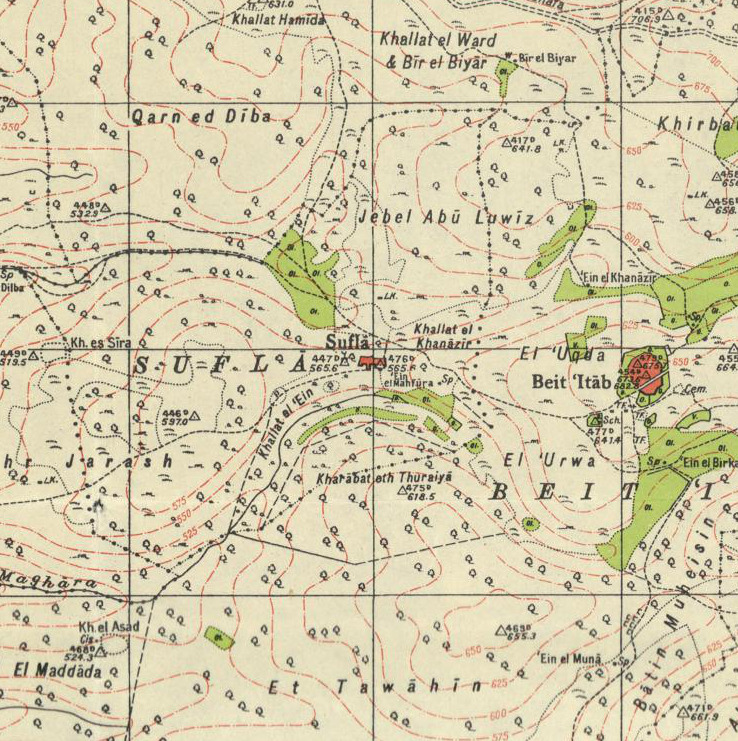
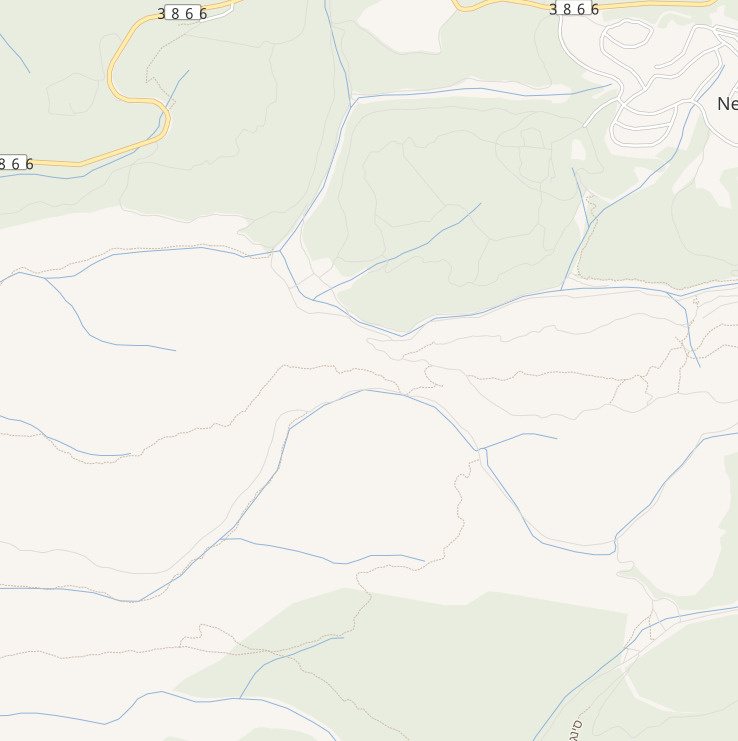
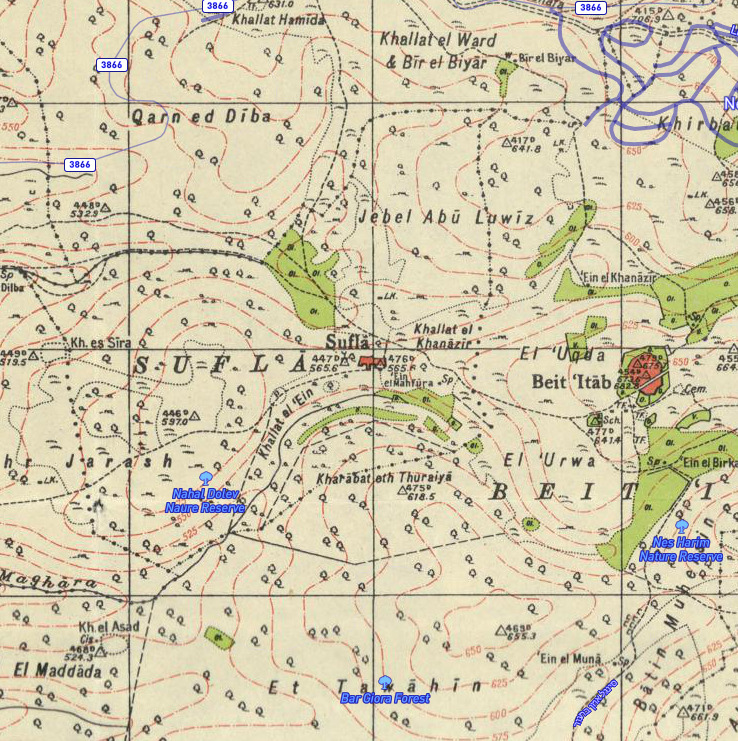
- 1870s map 1940s map modern map 1940s with modern overlay map A series of historical maps of the area around Sufla (click the buttons)

- Location within Mandatory Palestine
- Coordinates: 31°44′5″N 35°2′28″E
- Palestine grid: 153/126
- Geopolitical entity: Mandatory Palestine
- Subdistrict: Jerusalem
- Date of depopulation: October 19, 1948

Area
  - Total: 2,061 dunams (2.061 km^{2}; 0.796 sq mi)

Population (1945)
  - Total: 60
- Cause(s) of depopulation: Military assault by Yishuv forces

Sufla (Arabic: سفلى) was a Palestinian Arab village in the Jerusalem Subdistrict. It was depopulated during the 1948 Arab–Israeli War on October 19, 1948, by the Sixth Battalion of the Harel Brigade under Operation Ha-Har. It was located 18.5 km west of Jerusalem.

== History ==
Remains from the Crusader era have been found here.

=== Ottoman era ===
In 1838, it was noted as a Muslim village, es-Sifala, in the el-Arkub District, south west of Jerusalem.

In 1863 Victor Guérin noted a large grotto, partly filled with water. According to Guérin, Sufla was "reduced to a dozen houses."

An official Ottoman village list of about 1870 showed that safle had a total of 8 houses and a population of 18, though the population count included men only.

In 1883, the PEF's Survey of Western Palestine (SWP) described Es Sifleh as "a small village on a narrow ridge, which falls rapidly from Beit 'Atab. On the south-east is a fine spring ('Ain Sitti Hasna) coming out of a cleft in the rocks."

=== British Mandate era ===
In the 1922 census of Palestine conducted by the British Mandate authorities, Sufleh had a population of 46 inhabitants, all Muslims, increasing slightly in the 1931 census to a population of 49 inhabitants, in 10 houses.

In the 1945 statistics, the village had a population of 60 Muslims, with a total of 2,061 dunams of land according to an official land and population survey. Of the land, 400 dunams were for cereals, while 3 dunams were built-up (urban) land.

A shrine was located in the village dedicated to a local sage called al-Shaykh Mu'annis.

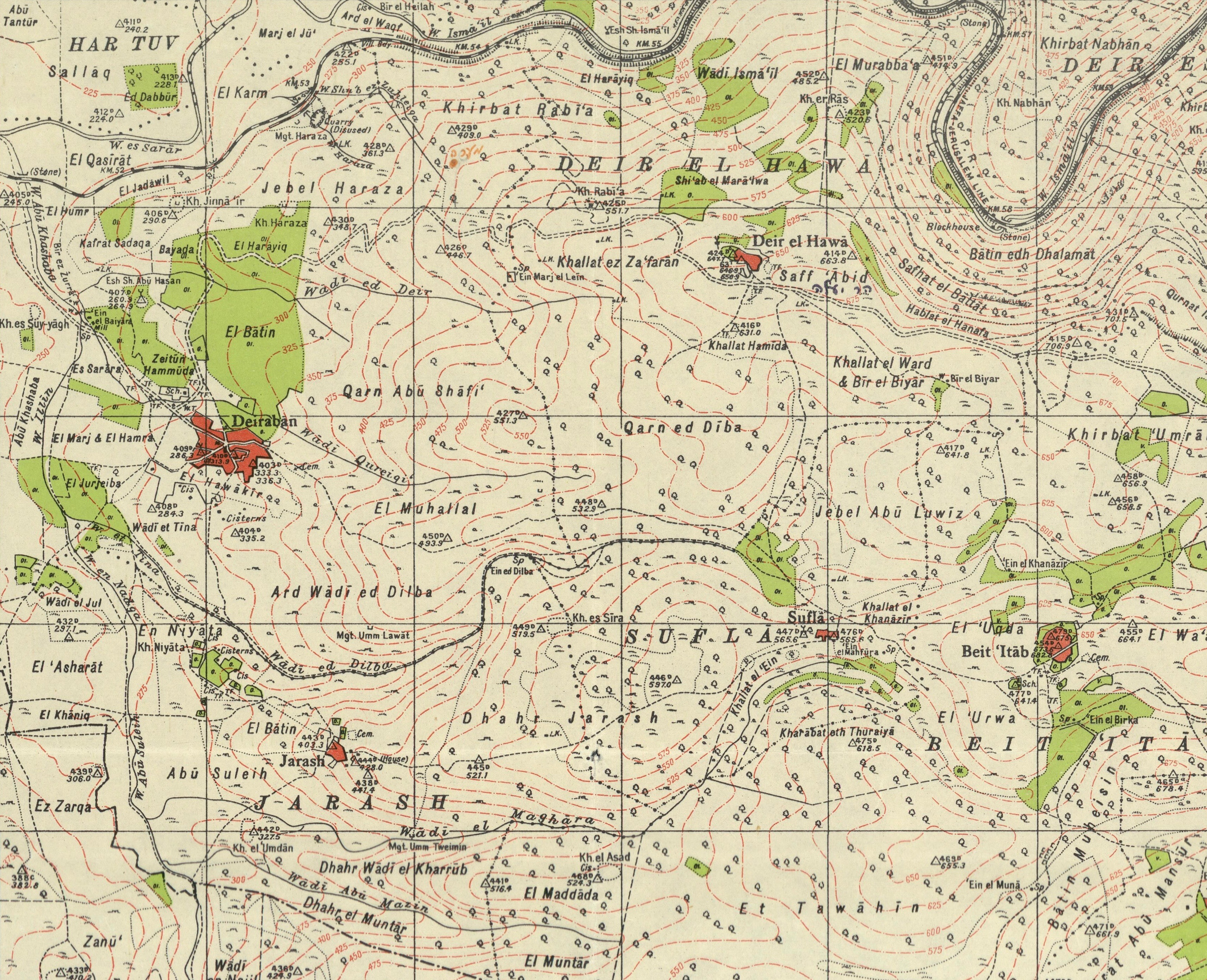
Sufla, Mandate survey, 1:20,000

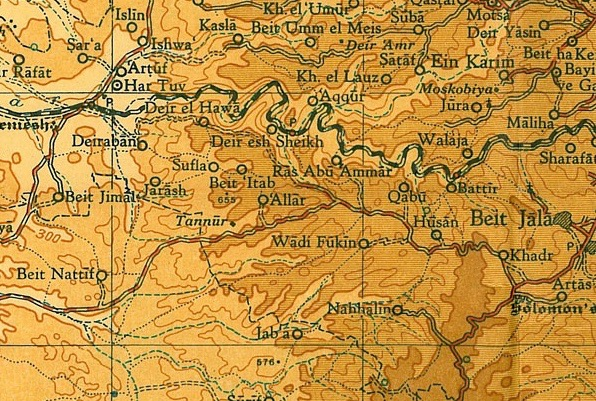
Sufla, 1945, 1:20,000

=== 1948 and aftermath ===
The village was depopulated in October, 1948, by the Harel Brigade under Operation Ha-Har, as were the villages of Dayr Aban, Bayt 'Itab, Beit Jimal, Bayt Nattif, Az-Zakariyya, and Al-Burayj. Following the war, the area was incorporated into the State of Israel, although the land of Sufla was left undeveloped.

In 1992, the village site was described as: "Stone rubble from houses is scattered throughout the site, which has become an open grazing area. Cave-like structures, formerly used as dwellings, also are present, and cactuses grow among the ruins and rubble. The village cemetery lies to the east of the site, and almond and olive groves cover the areas to the west and north."

== Bibliography ==
- Barron, J. B., ed. (1923). Palestine: Report and General Abstracts of the Census of 1922. Government of Palestine.
- Conder, C.R.; Kitchener, H.H. (1883). The Survey of Western Palestine: Memoirs of the Topography, Orography, Hydrography, and Archaeology. Vol. 3. London: Committee of the Palestine Exploration Fund.
- Department of Statistics (1945). Village Statistics, April, 1945. Government of Palestine.
- Guérin, V. (1869). Description Géographique Historique et Archéologique de la Palestine (in French). Vol. 1: Judee, pt. 3. Paris: L'Imprimerie Nationale.
- Hadawi, S. (1970). Village Statistics of 1945: A Classification of Land and Area ownership in Palestine. Palestine Liberation Organization Research Center.
- Hartmann, M. (1883). "Die Ortschaftenliste des Liwa Jerusalem in dem türkischen Staatskalender für Syrien auf das Jahr 1288 der Flucht (1871)". Zeitschrift des Deutschen Palästina-Vereins. 6: 102–149.
- Khalidi, W. (1992). All That Remains: The Palestinian Villages Occupied and Depopulated by Israel in 1948. Washington D.C.: Institute for Palestine Studies. ISBN 0-88728-224-5.
- Mills, E., ed. (1932). Census of Palestine 1931. Population of Villages, Towns and Administrative Areas. Jerusalem: Government of Palestine.
- Morris, B. (2004). The Birth of the Palestinian Refugee Problem Revisited. Cambridge University Press. ISBN 978-0-521-00967-6.
- Palmer, E.H. (1881). The Survey of Western Palestine: Arabic and English Name Lists Collected During the Survey by Lieutenants Conder and Kitchener, R. E. Transliterated and Explained by E.H. Palmer. Committee of the Palestine Exploration Fund.
- Robinson, E.; Smith, E. (1841). Biblical Researches in Palestine, Mount Sinai and Arabia Petraea: A Journal of Travels in the year 1838. Vol. 3. Boston: Crocker & Brewster.
- Socin, A. (1879). "Alphabetisches Verzeichniss von Ortschaften des Paschalik Jerusalem". Zeitschrift des Deutschen Palästina-Vereins. 2: 135–163.
