= Etam (biblical figure) =

Eitam (Hebrew: עיטם) is a proper name in the Bible. There are five references to the name Etam in the Hebrew Bible:

Person

- Eitam is mentioned in 1 Chronicles 4:3 as a descendant of Judah, likely a son of Hur. Eitam is the father of Jezreel, Ishma, Idbash and their sister Hazzelelponi.

Places

- Eitam (biblical town), as referenced in 2 Chronicles 11, was located southwest of Bethlehem near Tekoah.
- A village in the tribe of Simeon (1 Chronicles 4:32).
- Rock of Eitam, a rock where Samson hid.
