= E-gree (app) =

Legal app

E-gree is a legal app that became well known in 2020. It was the first app of its kind to protect users against a number of dating-related issues, including revenge porn.

== Background ==
The app was co-founded by Araz Mamet, Keith Fraser and Ilya Flaks. The app focuses on privacy, with users being able to set up various contracts to protect themselves following a breakup, or while dating. This notably included signing an NDA when sexting. The app received investment from a number of notable people and companies, including Natalia Vodianova.
