= Alexander McCaul =

Irish Hebraist and missionary

- Born: 16 May 1799; Dublin, Ireland
- Died: 13 November 1863 (aged 64); London, England
- Burial place: City of London Cemetery
- Education: Trinity College Dublin
- Occupations: Hebraist, missionary
- Known for: Missionary work among Jews, Hebrew scholarship
- Notable work: Old Paths
- Spouse: Mary Clarke McCaul (m. 1823)
- Children: 9, including: Elizabeth Anne Finn
- Relatives: John McCaul (brother); James Finn (son-in-law)

Alexander McCaul (16 May 1799 – 13 November 1863) was an Irish Hebraist, theologian and missionary for the London Society for Promoting Christianity Amongst the Jews.

McCaul studied Hebrew and German in Warsaw and later moved to St. Petersburg, where he was received by Alexander I of Russia. After returning to England and being ordained, he served as curate of Huntley, near Gloucester. He then returned to Poland in 1823 to lead the mission to the Jews in Warsaw and served as the English chaplain until 1830, despite conflicts with Lutheran congregations. In Berlin, he gained the support of the English ambassador George Henry Rose and the Crown Prince of Prussia.

In 1832, McCaul settled in London, supporting the London Society and founding the Jews' Operatives Converts Institution. He began publishing Old Paths, a weekly pamphlet on Jewish ritual. In 1840, he was appointed principal of the Hebrew college by the London Society and later became a professor at King's College London.

McCaul was also rector of St James Duke's Place and St Magnus-the-Martyr, as well as a prebendary of St Paul's Cathedral. He played a significant role in the Convocation of the English clergy, where he initially opposed, but later collaborated with, the High Church party. McCaul died on 13 November 1863 and is buried in the City of London Cemetery.

== Bibliography ==
McCaul was born on 16 May 1799 in Dublin to Protestant parents. The son of the merchant Alexander McCaul, McCaul was the elder brother of the classical scholar and University of Toronto president John McCaul. Educated at a private school, McCaul enrolled at Trinity College Dublin on 3 October 1814. Graduating with his Bachelor's in 1819, McCaul initially worked as a tutor to the sons of Lawrence Parsons, 2nd Earl of Rosse. Whilst preparing for a fellowship at Trinity, McCaul heard the sermons of Lewis Way of the London Society. McCaul subsequently renounced his fellowship, and was sent on his first London Society mission to Warsaw in 1821. McCaul studied German and Hebrew in Warsaw and in late 1822, travelled to Saint Petersburg where he was received by Alexander I of Russia.

On 22 December 1822, McCaul was ordained by Henry Ryder in Gloucester. McCaul subsequently served as the Curate of Huntley, and befriended Samuel Roffey Maitland. On 25 April 1823, McCaul married Mary Clarke Crosthwaite (1800–1893) at St. Peter's Church in Dublin. Returning to Poland, McCaul lived in Warsaw as head of the mission to the Jews, and English chaplain, until 1830. He was supported by the Grand Duke Constantine, but had disputes with the Lutheran congregations. Moving to Berlin, where he was befriended by George Henry Rose, the English ambassador, and by the Crown Prince of Prussia, who had known him at Warsaw.

To improve his health McCaul visited Ireland, and returned for a short time to Poland in 1832. Deciding to settle in London, he took up residence in Palestine Place, Cambridge Road and actively supported the London Society. He assisted in founding the Jews' Operatives Converts Institution, and in 1837 started the publication of Old Paths, a weekly pamphlet on Jewish ritual, which continued for sixty weeks.

In 1840, McCaul was appointed principal of the Hebrew college founded by the London Society; and in the summer of 1841, through Frederick William IV of Prussia, he was offered the bishopric of Jerusalem, but declined it because he thought it would be better held by one who had been a Jew. His friend Michael Solomon Alexander was appointed, and McCaul succeeded Alexander as professor of Hebrew and rabbinical literature at King's College, London. In 1846 he was also elected to the chair of divinity.

In 1843, McCaul was appointed rector of St James Duke's Place, London. In 1844 he became prebendary of St Paul's Cathedral, and in 1847 declined Archbishop William Howley's offer of one of the new colonial bishoprics. In 1850 he became rector of the united parish of St Magnus-the-Martyr. When the sittings of Convocation were revived in 1852, McCaul was elected proctor for the London clergy, and represented them for the rest of his life. At first strongly opposed to the revival of the ancient powers of convocation, he modified his views and worked with the High Church party, opposing the relaxation of the subscription to the 39 articles.

McCaul died at the rectory, St Magnus-the-Martyr, near London Bridge, on 13 November 1863. He is buried in the City of London Cemetery in the north-east of the city.

== Works ==
McCaul's major works:

- Plain Sermons on subjects Practical and Prophetic (1840).
- A Hebrew Primer (1844).
- Warburtonian Lectures (1st ser. 1846; 2nd ser. 1852).
- Rationalism, and the Divine Interpretation of Scripture (1850).
- The Old Paths (1854).
- Some Notes on the first chapter of the Book of Genesis (1861; criticism of Essays and Reviews).
- Testimonies to the Divine authority of the Holy Scriptures (1862).
- Reasons for Holding Fast the Authorized English Version of the Bible
- An Examination of Bishop Colenso's Difficulties with regard to the Pentateuch (1863–4, 2 vols. McCaul seconded George Anthony Denison's motion for the appointment of a committee — of which he was then a member — for the consideration of John Colenso's works on the Old Testament).

== Family ==
Married in 1823, McCaul left several sons. His daughter, Elizabeth Anne (1825–1921), writer and social activist, married James Finn, Consul to Ottoman Palestine, and founded the Distressed Gentlefolk's Aid Association, now known as Elizabeth Finn Care.
