= Natalia Vodianova =

Russian model (born 1982)

- Наталья Водянова
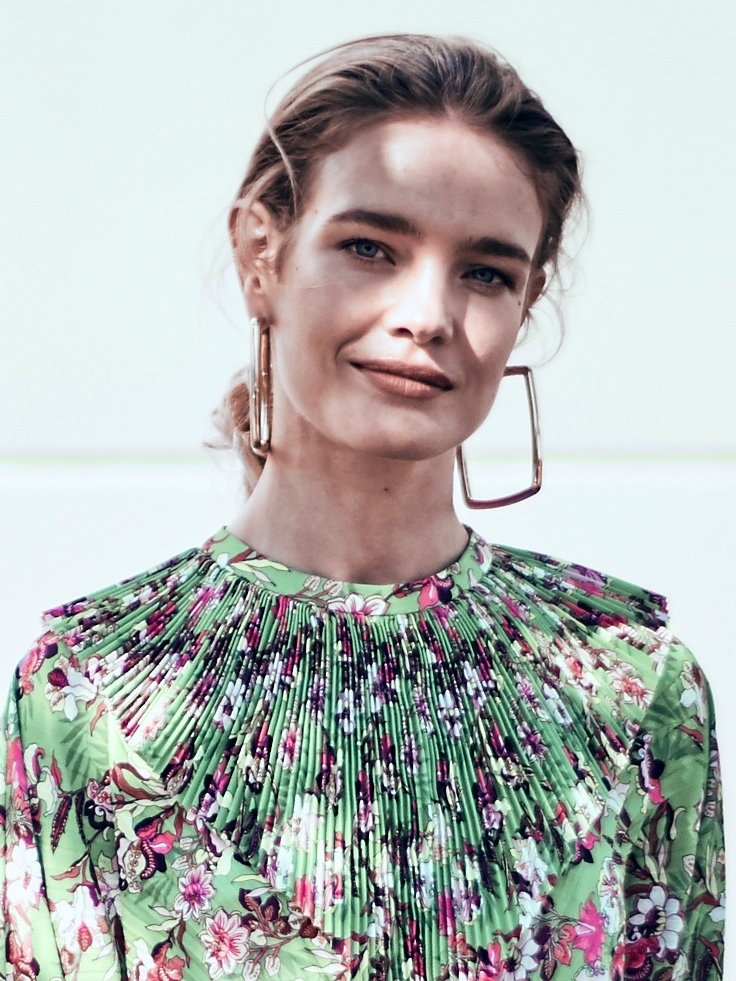
- Vodianova in 2019
- Born: 28 February 1982 (age 44); Gorky, Soviet Union
- Other name: Supernova
- Citizenship: Russia; United Kingdom
- Occupations: Model; philanthropist; entrepreneur
- Years active: 2000–present
- Spouses: Justin Portman (m. 2001; div. 2011); Antoine Arnault (m. 2020)
- Children: 6
- Modelling information
- Height: 1.76 m (5 ft 9 1/2 in)
- Hair colour: Blonde
- Eye colour: Blue
- Agency: DNA Model Management (New York); VIVA Model Management (Paris, London, Barcelona); Why Not Model Management (Milan)

Natalia Mikhailovna Vodianova (Note: In this name that follows East Slavic naming customs, the patronymic is Mikhailovna and the family name is Vodianova.) (Russian: Наталья Михайловна Водянова, IPA: [nɐˈtalʲjə mʲɪˈxajləvnə vədʲɪˈnovə]; (Note: Pronounced by her Водянова, IPA: [vɐˈdʲanəvə].) born 28 February 1982) is a Russian fashion model and philanthropist. In 2012, Forbes determined that she was the third highest-paid model in the world and has been declared a supermodel by numerous outlets. Her supermodel status led to the nickname Supernova.

Vodianova is a member of the Special Olympics International Board of Directors and has been a goodwill ambassador for the UNFPA since 2021.

== Early life ==
Natalia Mikhailovna Vodianova was born in Gorky, Soviet Union (now Nizhny Novgorod, Russia).

She grew up in a poor district of the city, where she helped her mother sell fruit on the street to support the family.

Vodianova was raised in poverty and has said that she was often bullied at school for being poorly dressed and very thin.

Her half-sister Oksana was born with cerebral palsy and autism, and required significant care during their childhood.

Vodianova also has a half-sister, Jennifer "Jenna" Burns (born Maria Mashinka), who was placed for adoption as a baby in the United States and later reunited with the family through a DNA test.

== Career ==
=== Modelling ===
At the age of 16, Vodianova began pursuing a career in modelling and was later discovered by a scout, which led to her moving to Paris and signing with the agency Viva Models.

She went on to become an internationally successful model, working with leading fashion photographers including Mario Testino and Annie Leibovitz, and appearing in major publications such as Vogue, Vanity Fair, and Interview.

Vodianova appeared on the cover of American Vogue in September 2004 alongside Gisele Bündchen and Daria Werbowy, and later as a solo cover model in July 2007.

In 2009, she entered a multi-year collaboration with the French lingerie brand Etam, designing seasonal collections marketed under the label Natalia pour Etam.

She has also worked extensively with major fashion houses and brands, including Guerlain and Stella McCartney, and has been featured in numerous international advertising campaigns.

Vodianova has been repeatedly listed among the world's highest-paid models by Forbes, reflecting her commercial success in the fashion industry.

=== Acting ===
Vodianova has appeared in several films, including Clash of the Titans (2010) and Belle du Seigneur (2012).

== Philanthropy ==
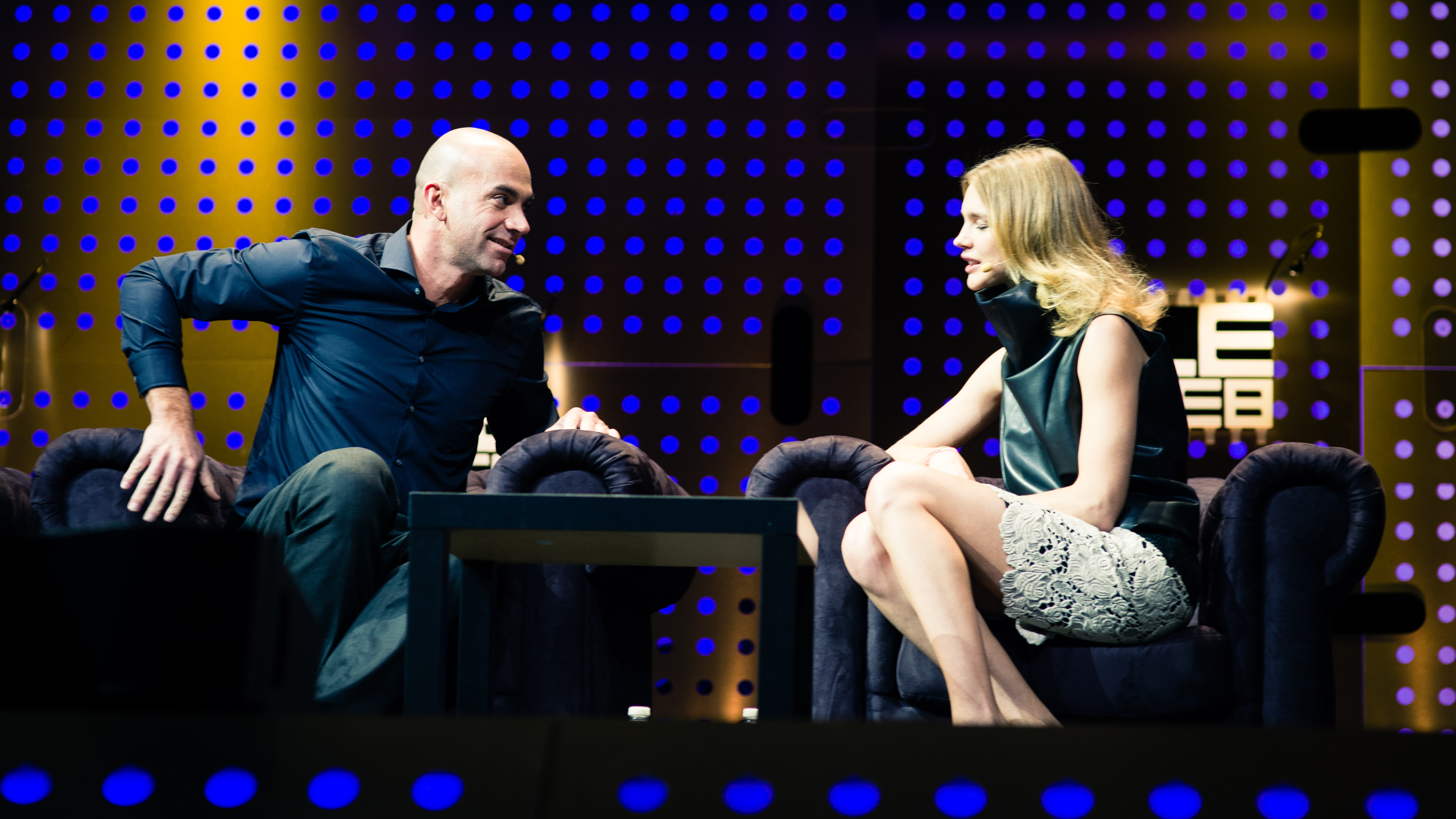
Vodianova (right) at LeWeb conference in 2012

Vodianova is the founder of the Naked Heart Foundation, a philanthropic organisation focused on supporting children with special needs and creating inclusive play environments in Russia.

Her sister Oksana lives with autism, and Vodianova has been an advocate for the rights of people with disabilities. In 2015, she drew international attention after her sister was reportedly asked to leave a café in Nizhny Novgorod because she was perceived as disturbing customers.

She was inspired to establish her charity following the Beslan school hostage crisis, aiming to support affected children through play and social programmes.

In addition to her foundation work, Vodianova has supported a range of international philanthropic initiatives and advocacy campaigns related to health, disability, and social inclusion.

In 2015, she co-founded the charitable digital platform Elbi, which enables users to donate to causes and engage with philanthropic campaigns.

== Other projects ==
=== Special Olympics ===
Vodianova is a member of the international board of directors for the Special Olympics and supported the 2014 European Games and the 2015 World Games.

=== United Nations Population Fund (UNFPA) goodwill ambassador ===
In February 2021, the United Nations Population Fund (UNFPA) appointed Vodianova as a goodwill ambassador. Referencing her prior work with UNFPA's "Let's Talk" series, fighting shame, exclusion and discrimination, faced routinely by millions of women and girls, the agency said it hoped their partnerships would bridge the divide between the fashion and technology industries.

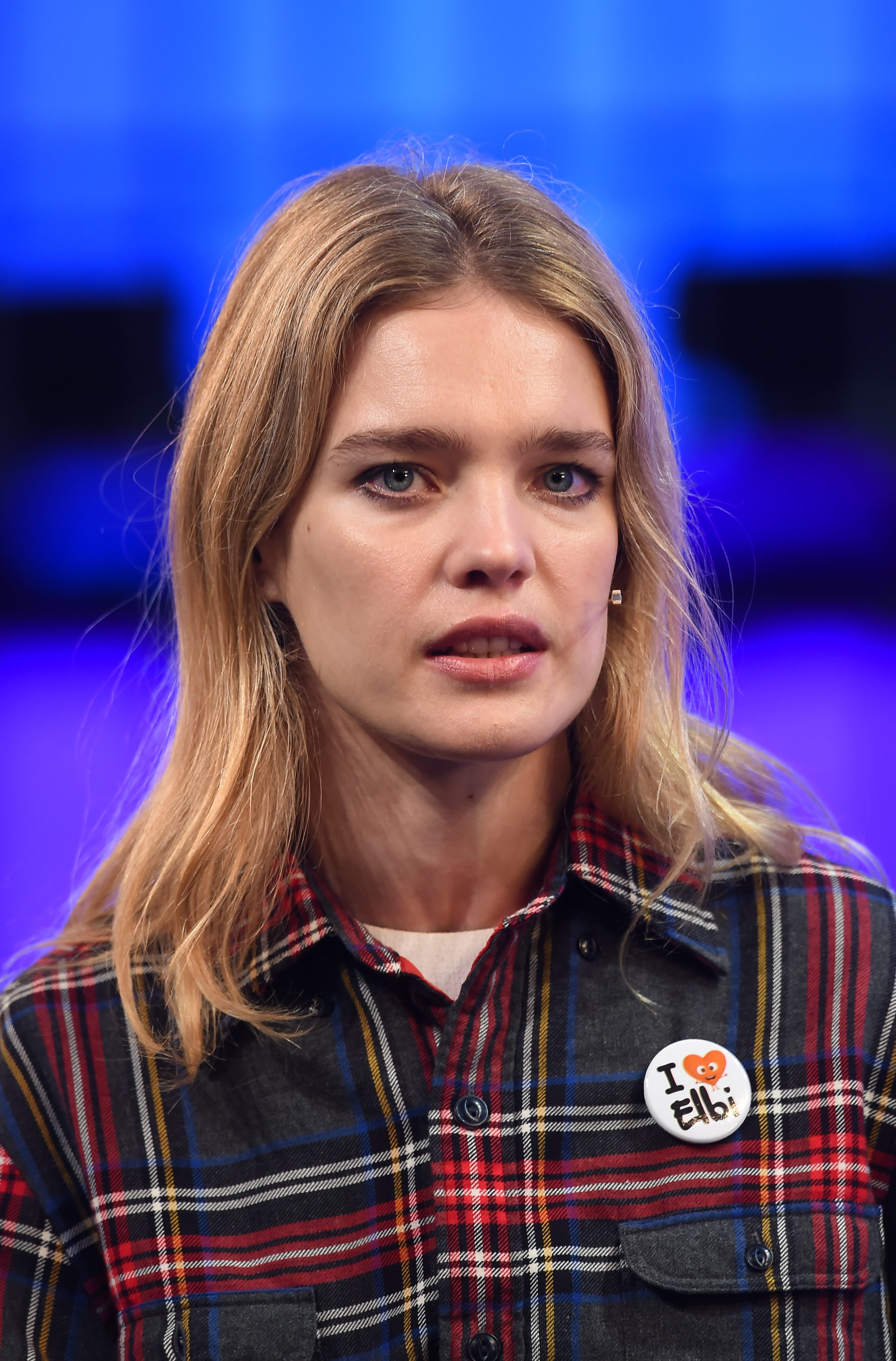
Vodianova at Web Summit 2015

== Awards ==
In November 2010, Harper's Bazaar named Vodianova "Inspiration of the Year" at its Women of the Year Awards in recognition of her philanthropic work.

In April 2013, she was honoured with the Inspiration Award at the fourth annual DVF Awards. The award is given to women "who have demonstrated leadership, strength and courage in the face of adversity, and who use their influence to effect positive change."

On 10 November 2014, Vodianova was one of the honored 2014 Glamour Woman of the Year for her contribution and philanthropy as The Voice for Children. The ceremony was held at Carnegie Hall, with Arianna Huffington presenting the award to Vodianova.

== Personal life ==
Vodianova met Justin Portman (b. 1969), half-brother of the 10th Viscount Portman and son of Edward Portman, 9th Viscount Portman, a British property heir, at a Paris dinner in 2000. They married in November 2001 when she was 8 months pregnant. In September 2002, over nine months after registering the marriage in the UK, they had a wedding ceremony in St. Petersburg, where Vodianova wore a dress designed by Tom Ford. They have three children: two sons born in 2001 and 2007, and a daughter born in 2006. Vodianova and Portman announced their separation in June 2011 and divorced later that year.

Following her separation from Portman, Vodianova began a relationship with Antoine Arnault, son of LVMH founder Bernard Arnault and the CEO of luxury brand Berluti. In May 2014, she gave birth to their first son together. Two years later, the couple welcomed a second son in June 2016. Vodianova announced their engagement on 31 December 2019. The COVID-19 pandemic forced the cancellation of their 27 June 2020 wedding at Saint-Pierre d'Hautvillers Abbey; the couple instead married on 21 June 2020 at a Paris city council. They have an apartment in Paris. In May 2026, she announced her sixth pregnancy on the cover of Vogue France.

== Notes ==
Preceded by (Serbia) Jovana Janković and Željko Joksimović	Eurovision Song Contest presenter 2009; With: Andrey Malakhov (Semi-finals)	Succeeded by (Norway) Nadia Hasnaoui, Haddy Jatou N'jie and Erik Solbakken
