= Turn2us =

Charity that helps people living in poverty in the UK and Ireland

- Type: Charity
- Industry: Third Sector
- Founded: 1897
- Headquarters: UK
- Key people: Thomas Lawson, Chief Executive
- Services: Provides around £4 million a year in direct grants to those living in poverty, free online tools including the Turn2us Benefits Calculator and Grant Search tool and information and support resources
- Number of employees: 50
- Website: www.turn2us.org.uk

Turn2us is a trading name for Elizabeth Finn Care, a charity registered in England and Wales, and in Scotland that helps people living in poverty in the UK. Turn2us provides information and support about welfare benefits and charitable grants through an accessible website.

In May 2015 Turn2us was integrated with former parent charity Elizabeth Finn Care with both brands coming under the Turn2us banner. The charity Turn2us is registered in England and Wales: 207812 and Scotland: SC040987.

== Aims ==
Over 14 million people currently live in poverty in the UK, including 4.5 million children. Turn2us was set up to respond to this need.

== Campaigns ==
The charity holds a number of regular campaigns aimed at raising awareness of issues relating to poverty and raising funds for charitable activity. In 2014 the fuel poverty campaign was supported by a number of politicians including Brooks Newmark, the Secretary of State for Energy and Climate Change Ed Davey, Cheryl Gillan and Dan Jarvis.

In 2015 the Independent newspaper reported "The charity is launching a new "Cut out the Cold" campaign to highlight the help that struggling people can get with energy costs. Its research suggests that seven out of 10 families have never heard of the Warm Home Discount scheme, for instance, which hands hard-up folk a £140 discount on their electricity bill. The research also reveals that half of hard-up families have not checked their eligibility for benefits while almost nine out of 10 have not checked what free charitable grants may exist. We need to see more done to help raise awareness of the financial support and help available to manage energy bills," said Alison Taylor. "It is vital that people on low incomes are not left behind.”

In November 2015 the charity launched its No Cold Homes campaign to raise awareness of those struggling to afford to heat their homes. The campaign drew support from a range of high-profile celebrities who donated winter items to raise money for the charity. Oscar-winning actress Helen Mirren, who donated to the campaign, commenting, "I'm pleased to play a part in helping more families get the vital help they need this winter."

In 2016 the charity released new research as part of the No Cold Homes campaign highlighting the extent to which people are unaware of the support that is available. In response to the findings, Turn2us brought together representatives of the 'big six' energy companies to discuss the problem, which attracted broad media coverage.

== Integration with Elizabeth Finn Care ==
On 1 October 2009, Elizabeth Finn Care and Turn2us legally merged to form a single charity, to provide more effective help to the 14 million people currently living in poverty in the UK. At the time of the reintegration it was decided that the two parts of the newly formed charity would preserve their separate identities.

In 2014 the charity embarked on a project to look into the impact of coming under one brand. As a result of the consultation, it was announced that Elizabeth Finn Care and Turn2us were to become Turn2us. On 18 May 2015 the charity formally came under the Turn2us name and a new logo and strap-line was produced to reflect the changes.

== Services and activities ==
When the charity began operating under the Turn2us brand in May 2015, it consolidated the charitable activity of Turn2us, Elizabeth Finn Care and Elizabeth Finn Grants under one name. Elizabeth Finn Homes Limited was not impacted by the reintegration and remains a separate brand. The largest activity as a proportion of charitable expenditure is direct grant giving. In 2017/18, the charity gave £4 million to over 3,859 individuals.

The other main area of charitable activity is through raising awareness of financial support through the charity website turn2us.org.uk The charity's Annual Report claims that in 2017/18 almost 7 million people used the website.
