= Etam, West Virginia =

Unincorporated community in West Virginia, United States

Etam
- Unincorporated community
- Location within the state of West Virginia Etam (the United States)
- Coordinates: 39°17′7″N 79°43′41″W
- Country: United States
- State: West Virginia
- County: Preston
- Elevation: 1,749 ft (533 m)
- Time zone: UTC-5 (Eastern (EST))
  - Summer (DST): UTC-4 (EDT)
- GNIS ID: 1554413

Etam is an unincorporated community in Preston County, West Virginia, United States.

The community most likely was named after the biblical place Etam.
