= Kerem Avraham =

Neighbourhood in Jerusalem

Coordinates: 31°47′24″N 35°13′2″E

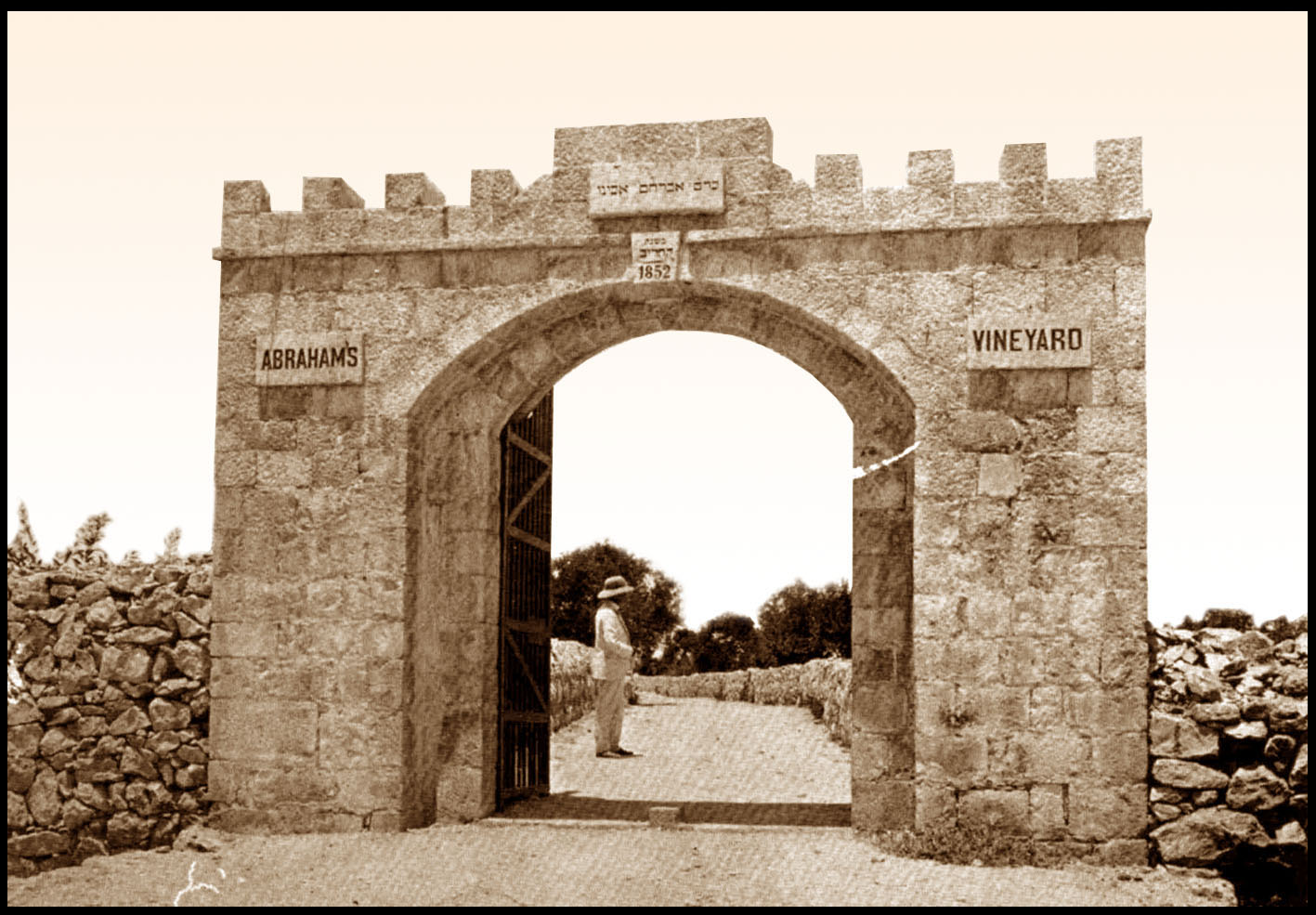
James Finn at the entrance to Kerem Avraham

Kerem Avraham, in English Abraham's Vineyard, is a neighbourhood near Geula in central Jerusalem, founded in 1855. It is bounded by Malkhei Yisrael Street, Yechezkel Street, Tzefanya Street, and the Schneller Compound.

The 1855 mission house was one of the first structures to be built outside the Old City of Jerusalem; the others are the Schneller Orphanage, the Bishop Gobat school, Mishkenot Sha’ananim, and the Russian Compound.

== History ==
=== 19th century ===
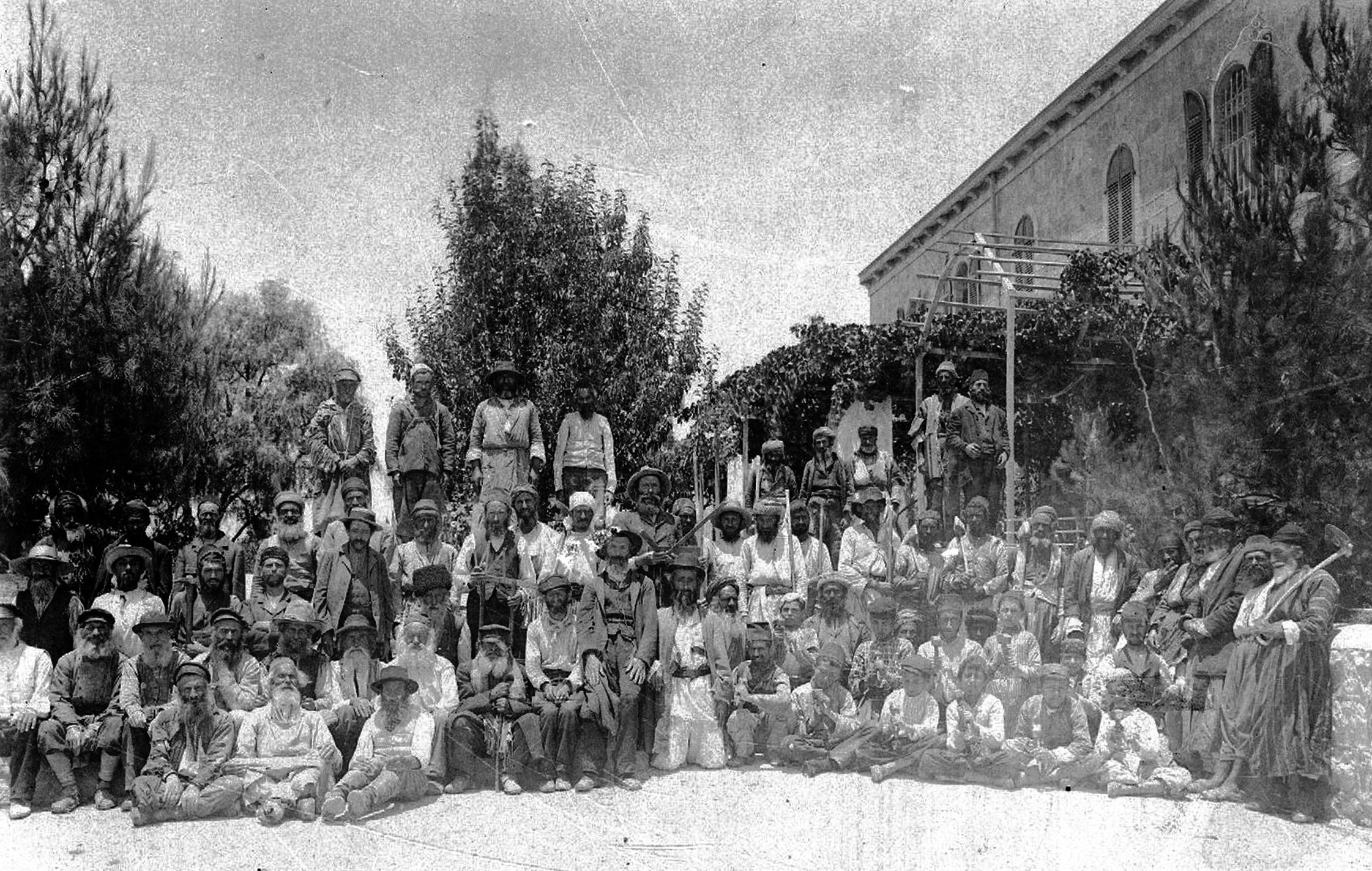
Jewish workers in Kerem Avraham in 1855

Abraham's Vineyard, the future Kerem Avraham, was established by James Finn, British Consul in Ottoman Jerusalem, and his wife Elizabeth Anne Finn. Finn was a devout Christian, who belonged to the London Society for Promoting Christianity Amongst the Jews, but who did not engage in missionary work during his years in Jerusalem.

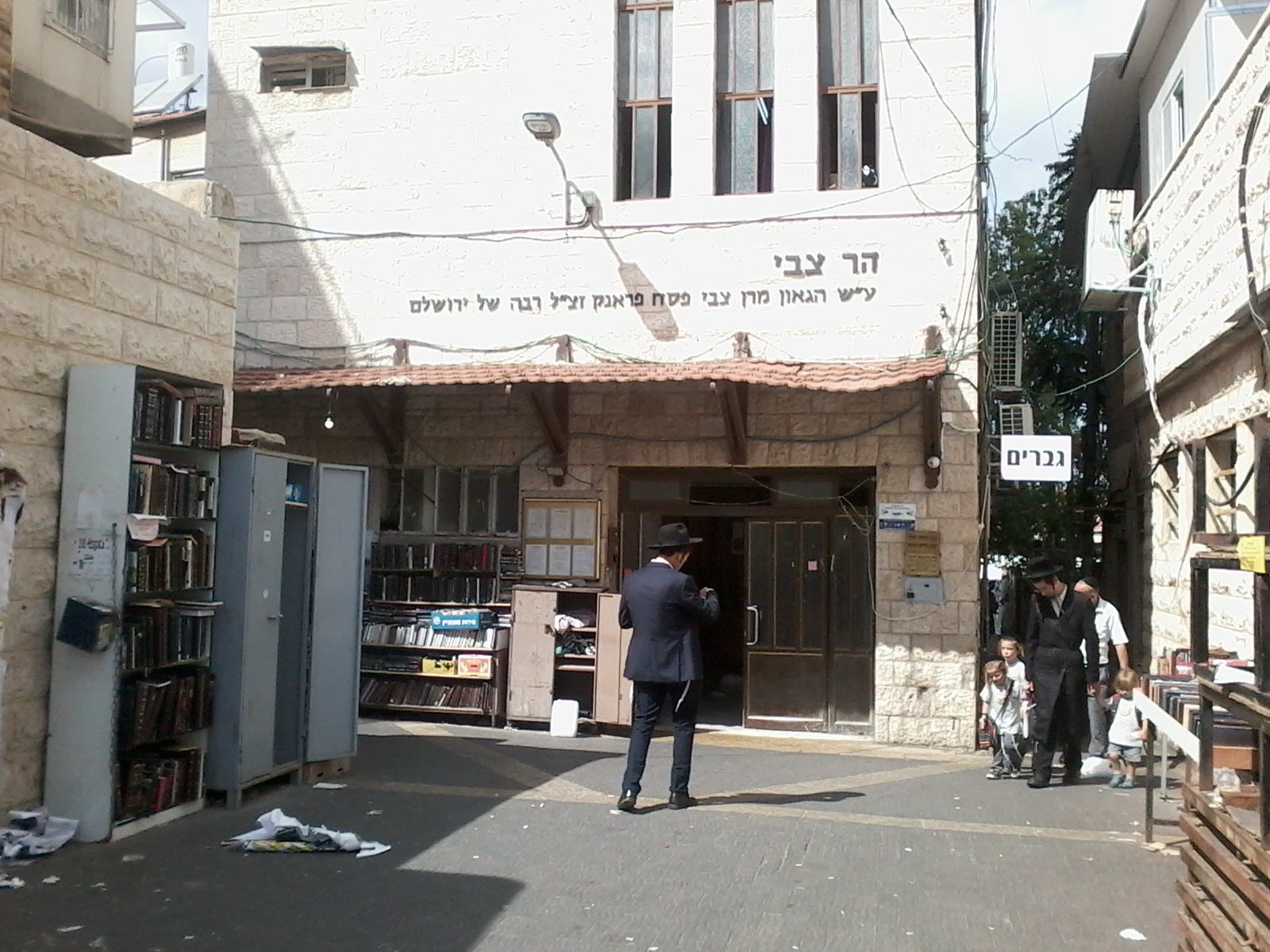
The Har Tzvi Synagogue, the main synagogue in the neighborhood

In 1852, Finn purchased Karm al-Khalil (lit. "the friend's vineyard", meaning "Abraham's Vineyard"), a 10-acre plot of barren land outside the walls of the Old City. There he established "The Industrial Plantation for Employment of Jews in Jerusalem" to train Jews in agriculture and other trades so they could become self-supporting, rather than relying on the halukka welfare distribution. The manager was a Christian named Dunn who believed he was a descendant of the tribe of Dan. Finn employed Jewish laborers to build the first house there in 1855 and cisterns for water storage were built.

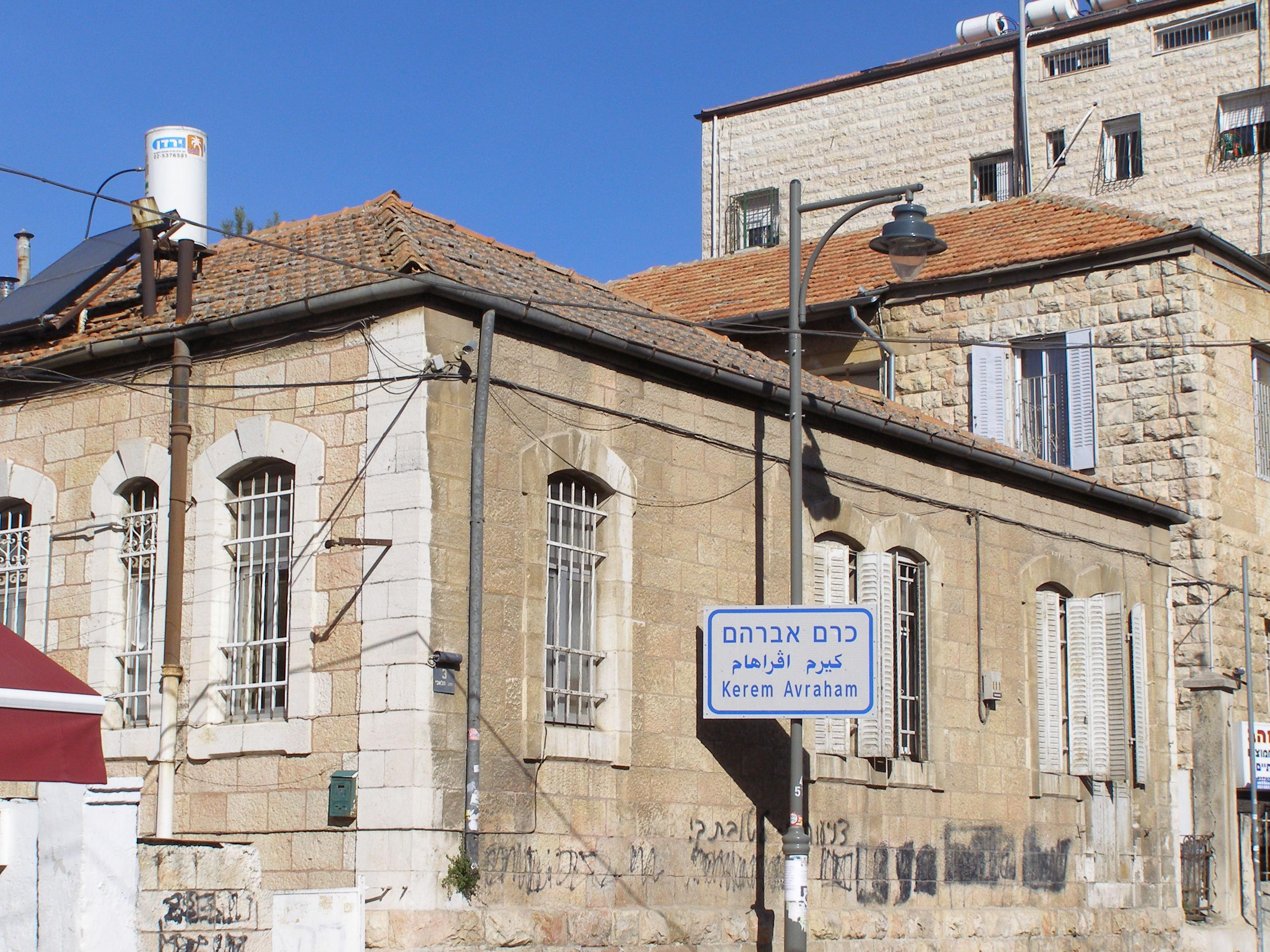
A house in the neighborhood

After Finn's death, a soap-making factory was established by his widow and high quality kosher soap was produced which was sold locally and exported abroad. The soap was made from olive oil fat mixed with alkali (barilla), which grew in the Jordan valley. The soap production became the most widely known industry which took place at the compound.

=== 20th century ===
Israeli novelist Amos Oz grew up in Kerem Avraham in the 1940s.

=== 21st century ===
Most of the residents of Kerem Avraham today are Haredi.
