= Elizabeth Anne Finn =

British writer, translator and philanthropist (1825–1921)

- Born: Elizabeth Anne McCaul; 14 March 1825; Warsaw, Congress Poland
- Died: 18 January 1921 (aged 95); Brook Green, Hammersmith, London, England
- Resting place: Wimbledon, London
- Occupations: Writer; translator; artist; philanthropist
- Years active: 1846 – 1920
- Board member of: Distressed Gentlefolk's Aid Association
- Spouse: James Finn
- Children: 3
- Father: Alexander McCaul
- Relatives: John McCaul (uncle)

Elizabeth Anne Finn (née McCaul; 14 March 1825 – 18 January 1921) was a British writer, translator, artist and philanthropist. Finn co-founded the Distressed Gentlefolk's Aid Association, the predecessor of Elizabeth Finn Care, with her daughter Constance Finn.

== Early life ==
Finn was born Elizabeth Anne McCaul on 14 March 1825 in Warsaw, Congress Poland to Revd Alexander McCaul, a Hebrew scholar and missionary for the London Society for Promoting Christianity Amongst the Jews (LSPCAJ), and Mary Clarke McCaul (née Crosthwaite; 1800–1893). (Note: Also cited as Ann.) Both of McCaul's parents were born in Dublin. One of at least of 9 siblings, McCaul was the paternal niece of the classical scholar and University of Toronto president John McCaul.

Educated at home by her mother, McCaul was taught Hebrew by her father and had a talent for languages. In 1831, the family moved to London and settled at the LSPCAJ property Palestine Place in Bethnal Green. At the age of twelve, McCaul taught Hebrew and translated German works for publication. McCaul would rise at 3:30 each morning to translate for publication Lavater's Maxims from the German original, for which she received two guineas. Queen Adelaide purchased a larger number of copies of this book for a bazaar, on the condition that McCaul herself would benefit.

== Diplomatic life ==
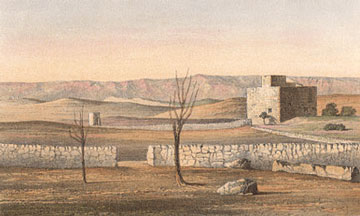
Finn (1873) "Near Jerusalem, Evening"

From 1841, the Arabic and Hebrew scholar James Finn became a regular visitor to the family home. McCaul and Finn, who had been appointed British consul for Jerusalem in November 1845, married on 2 January 1846 at St John on Bethnal Green.

Following the marriage the couple moved to Jerusalem. The consuls were instructed to befriend in every possible way the Jews in Jerusalem and Palestine, who had no kind of European protection. As a diplomat's wife in Jerusalem, Finn learned Arabic by asking her Dragoman for ten Arabic words each day, putting one on the fingers of each hand. In later life asked to translate the correspondence in Arabic dialect between the Mahdi Muhammed Ahmed and the late General Gordon 'of Khartoum.'

In November 1849 she helped to establish the Jerusalem Literary Society to explore the natural and ancient history of the region objectively and free from religious controversy. The Finns who had formed a library of a thousand volumes and a small museum, would take advantage of the Saturday, on which no Jewish business could be carried out, to ride out into the countryside in search of antiquities and there make valuable discoveries.

Many eminent travellers attended meetings of the Jerusalem Literary Society, news of which attracted the notice of Albert, Prince Consort, George Hamilton-Gordon, 4th Earl of Aberdeen and the Archbishop of Canterbury. During these years Finn became one of the first modern Europeans to be given permission to visit the Temple Mount and Dome of the Rock.

Finn contributed as a pioneer of photography helping bring the newly invented art to the region and, also supporting photographers such as Mendel John Diness, who was born in Odessa, moved to Palestine, and converted from Judaism to Christianity. When King Edward VII visited Jerusalem in April 1862, Finn took a photograph of him near a tree described as the "pine tree of Godfrey de Bouillon." It is included in a bound album of early photographs of the Holy Land taken by her, now preserved at Yad Ben Zvi in Jerusalem.

The landscape of Palestine and Jerusalem was of keen interest to Finn as is evinced by the meticulous depictions made in both word-paintings and pen and pencil sketches of various Biblical and historical landscapes. Her work is marked with a painstaking level of attention as to how the landscape is charged and altered by the effects of light at different times of day.

William Holman Hunt who visited the region in 1854 halfway through the Finns' time in Jerusalem to research and sketch for The Scapegoat (painting) provided an introductory letter to Mrs Finn's eventual published collection of sketches validating her work as "very excellent topographical studies of the localities and in colour by no means overcharged for the original effects which the mountains, sky and plains of Syria glory in."

She was also able to entertain both Prince Alfred (second son of Queen Victoria) and latterly his elder brother the Prince of Wales (later Edward VII) in charming royal style, so forming the connections with Royal patronage that would later provide crucial early support for the Distressed Gentlefolk's Aid Association.

During her stay in Jerusalem, Finn organised training and employment of local men and women as carpenters, farm labourers and seamstresses. She raised money from abroad to battle malnutrition among the poor. She raised funds to purchase Kerem Avraham, a farm outside Jerusalem. She oversaw the excavation of extensive cisterns at Abraham's Vineyard to alleviate Jerusalem's inadequate water supply. In January 1854, she established the 'Sarah Society' which made home visits to poor women, providing relief in the form of rice, sugar and coffee.

== Later life ==
The Finns made plans to return to England in 1863, eventually leaving on 14 July with Jewish bodies sending several petitions to the Queen not to remove their benefactor (James Finn) but to no avail. They spent the next three years visiting friends and relations, finally settling in Hammersmith. James Finn, suffering from poor health, died in 1872 aged 66. In 1875, Elizabeth Finn was asked by the Archbishop of Canterbury to act as translator for the Patriarch of the Ancient Syrian Church whilst he pursued a mission to England to support the claims of his parishioners on the coast of Malabar. A two-week visit extended to an embassy lasting seven months that indulged the appetites of senior churchmen, politicians including William Ewart Gladstone, Lord Salisbury and Queen Victoria for religious enquiry and disputation. Elizabeth Finn would repeat this task in 1908 and 1909 for the Bishop of Syria who had succeeded as Patriarch having himself accompanied the mission in 1875.

Finn continued to lecture on Biblical subjects in the Assyrian Room of the British Museum and retold her experiences in Jerusalem in support of the Survey for Exploration of Palestine at fundraising meetings to build on the legacy of the Jerusalem Literary Society.

In 1882 Elizabeth Finn, then 57, launched the Society for Relief of Distressed Jews to provide support for Russian Jews facing severe persecution during violent pogroms. Sir John Simon, a leading member of England's Jewish community was moved to testify to 'Mrs Finn's extraordinary knowledge of his people and astonishment that a Christian should take such an interest in his afflicted people'.

== Distressed Gentlefolk's Aid Association ==
Finn founded the Distressed Gentlefolk's Aid Association based in her home in Brook Green, Hammersmith, to alleviate the suffering of those she saw in her own immediate environment. D.G.A.A. either bestowed grants for the immediate relief of the elderly and infirm or empowered individuals capable of working to get back onto their feet and find employment through targeted support and micro-loans.

Although ending her 'formal' participation with D.G.A.A. in 1901, Elizabeth Finn continued to closely monitor and assist the society for the rest of her life – attending her final committee meeting on 5 November 1920 two months before her death.

== Children and death ==
Three surviving children were born during the Finns' diplomatic mission. Their eldest child Alexander 'Guy Fawkes' Finn, who, like his father would pursue a diplomatic career, retiring as Consul General for Chile, was born on 5 November 1847. In October 1851 Elizabeth's daughter Constance was born inside a tent pitched on a field north west of Jerusalem. Elizabeth Finn gave birth to Constance having spent the entirety of the previous day personally entertaining the wife of the Turkish Pasha and her numerous escort of friends, servants and slaves. A second son, Arthur Henry, was born in 1854 and in later life as a Hebrew scholar wrote "The Unity of the Pentateuch".

At the age of 72, Finn and her daughter Constance founded the Distressed Gentlefolk's Aid Association, the predecessor of Elizabeth Finn Care on 5 May 1897 'in the hope of alleviating some of the distress which has overtaken ladies and gentlemen who have seen better days.'

She died at home in Brook Green, Hammersmith, London on 18 January 1921 at the age of 95. She is buried next to her husband James in Wimbledon. Elizabeth Finn Care have their head office based just a few hundred yards from her home, which is marked with a blue plaque to commemorate her charitable work.

== Published works ==
- A Home in the Holy Land. A tale illustrating customs and incidents in modern Jerusalem London 1866 original.
- A Home in the Holy Land. A tale illustrating customs and incidents in modern Jerusalem. Adamant Media, Boston, 2002 reprint of the London 1866 original. ISBN 978-1-4021-1768-8
- A Third Year in Jerusalem. A tale illustrating customs and incidents of modern Jerusalem; or, a sequel to "Home in the Holy Land". Adamant Media, Boston, 2002 reprint of the London 1869 original. ISBN 978-1-4021-1053-5
- Reminiscences of Mrs Finn; Marshall, Morgan and Scott, 1929, London
- Palestine Peasantry. Note on their clans, warfare, religion and laws Marshall Bros. 1923 95 pp. London, & Edinburgh
- Original Maxims for the Young Translated by the Daughter of a Clergyman [i.e. Elizabeth Anne McCaul, afterwards Finn] 1838, London
- Sunrise over Jerusalem, with other pen and pencil sketches. John B Day, 1873, London
- Emmaus Identified – Printed for the Author – 75 Brook Green, London, W (first published in the Quarterly Journal January 1883 of the Palestine Exploration Fund)

== See also ==
- Saint George Interfaith shrine
- Motza
- Artas (village)
