= Palestine Exploration Fund =

British society founded in 1865

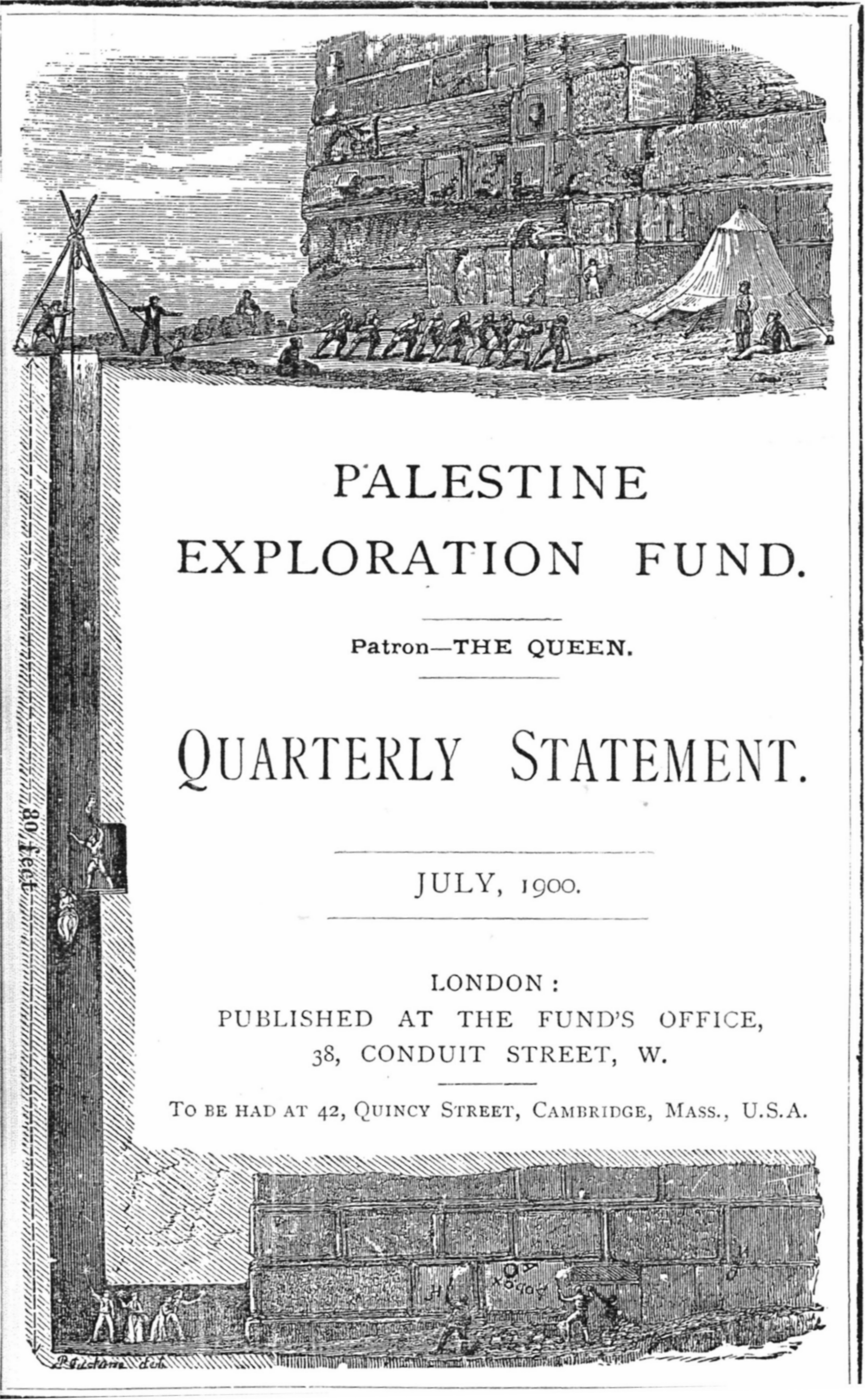
Palestinian Exploration Fund's Quarterly Statement, July 1900

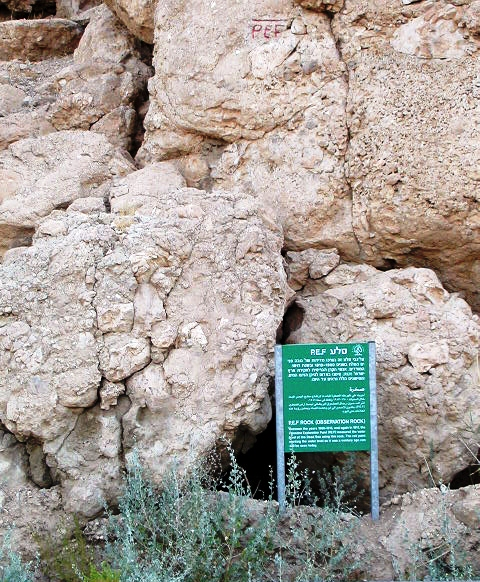
PEF rock: Mark on boulder used by the PEF as a reference level (datum) for surveying the Dead Sea in the beginning of the 20th century

The Palestine Exploration Fund is a British society based in London. It was founded in 1865, shortly after the completion of the Ordnance Survey of Jerusalem by Royal Engineers of the War Department. The Fund is the oldest known organization in the world created specifically for the study of the Levant region, also known as Palestine. Often simply known as the PEF, its initial objective was to carry out surveys of the topography and ethnography of Ottoman Palestine – producing the PEF Survey of Palestine. Its remit was considered to fall between an expeditionary survey and military intelligence gathering. There was also strong religious interest from Christians; William Thomson, Archbishop of York, was the first president of the PEF.

As a result, the PEF had a complex relationship with Corps of Royal Engineers of the War Department. The PEF members sent back reports to the UK on the need to salvage and modernise the Levant region.

== History ==
"This country of Palestine belongs to you and me, it is essentially ours. It was given to the Father of Israel in the words: "Walk through the land in the length of it, and in the breadth of it, for I will give it unto thee". We mean to walk through Palestine in the length and in the breadth of it, because that land has been given unto us. It is the land from which comes news of our Redemption. It is the land towards which we turn as the fountain of all our hopes; it is the land to which we may look with as true a patriotism as we do in this dear old England, which we love so much."

— Speech at the first meeting of the PEF: William Thomson, the Archbishop of York and first President of the PEF

According to Lorenzo Kamel, the Palestine Exploration Fund (PEF) was established in London in 1865, after Edward, Prince of Wales visited Palestine. Kamel writes that it was inspired by James Finn, British consul to Ottoman Jerusalem and that the PEF received two major initial donations: £150 from Queen Victoria and £500 from the University of Oxford.

Following the completion of the Ordnance Survey of Jerusalem, the Biblical archaeologists and clergymen who supported the survey financed the creation of the fund. It was founded on 22 June 1865 with initial funding of £300.

The most notable of the founders were Arthur P. Stanley, the Dean of Westminster, and George Grove, who later founded the Royal College of Music and was responsible for Grove's Dictionary of Music. Its founders established the fund "for the purpose of investigating the Archaeology, Geography, manners, customs and culture, Geology and Natural History of the Holy Land".

The roots of the Palestine Exploration Fund lie in a literary society founded by British Consul James Finn and his wife Elizabeth Anne Finn. Many photographs of Palestine have survived from this period. Frederick J. Bliss wrote of the foundation that "[a]s far as its aims were concerned this organization was but a re-institution of a Society formed about the year 1804 under the name of the Palestine Association... it is interesting to note that the General Committee of the Palestine Exploration Fund recognized an organic connection with the earlier Society."

The preliminary meeting of the Society of the Palestine Exploration Fund took place in the Jerusalem Chamber of Westminster Abbey. William Thomson, the Archbishop of York, publicly read the original prospectus at this meeting;

[O]ur object is strictly an inductive inquiry. We are not to be a religious society; we are not about to launch controversy; we are about to apply the rules of science, which are so well understood by us in our branches, to an investigation into the facts concerning the Holy Land. "No country should be of so much interest to us as that in which the documents of our Faith were written, and the momentous events they describe enacted. At the same time no country more urgently requires illustration ... Even to a casual traveller in the Holy Land the Bible becomes, in its form, and therefore to some extent in its substance, a new book. Much would be gained by ...bringing to light the remains of so many races and generations which must lie concealed under the accumulation of rubbish and ruins on which those villages stand ...

The PEF conducted many early excavations of biblical and post-biblical sites around the Levant, as well as studies involving natural history, anthropology, history and geography.

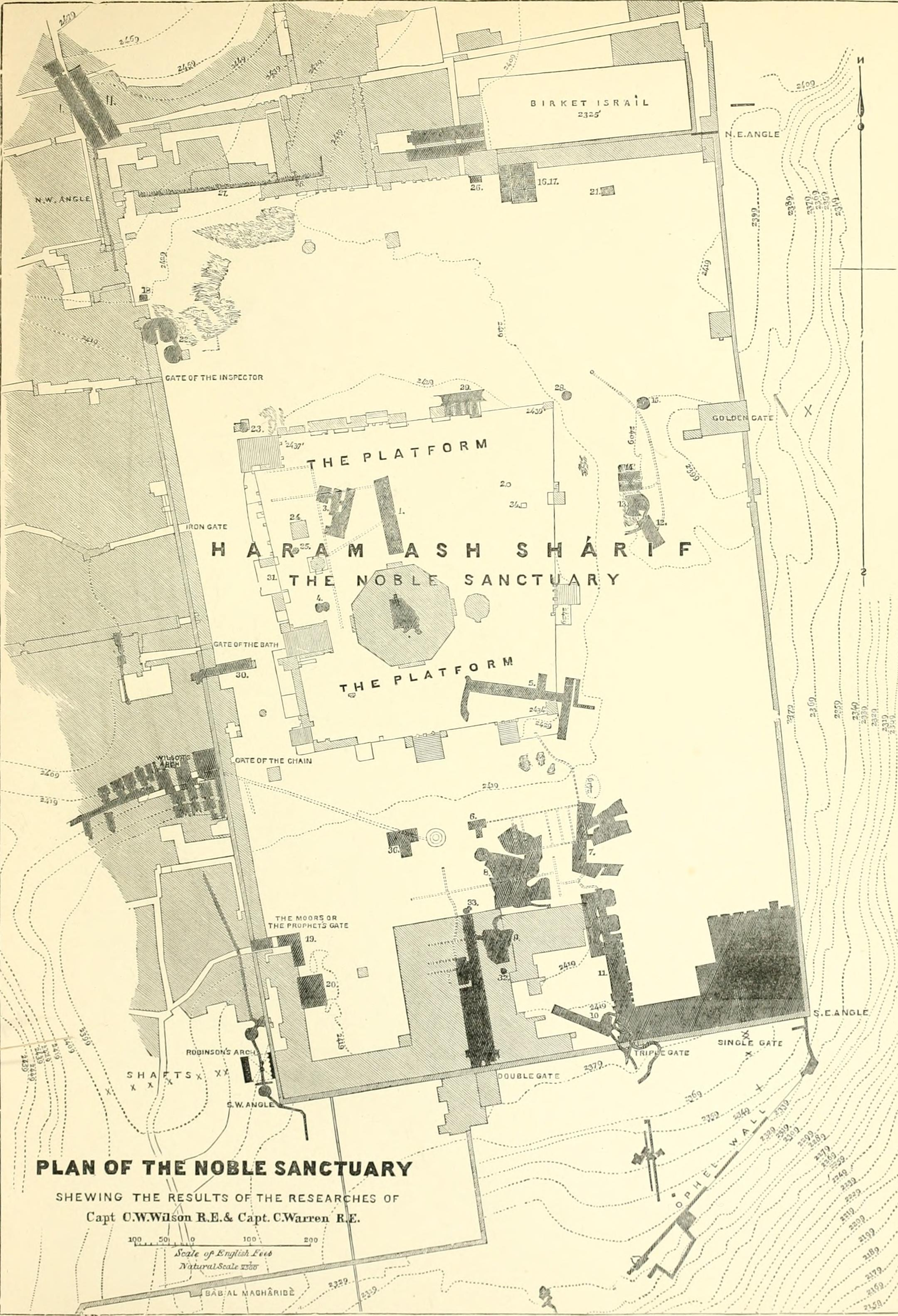
"Plan of the Noble Sanctuary" from The Survey of Western Palestine-Jerusalem (1884)

In 1867, Charles Warren led PEF's biggest expedition. Warren and his team improved the topography of Jerusalem and discovered the ancient water systems that lay beneath the city. The water system was later named Warren's Shaft, after his work. They also made the first excavations of Tell es-Sultan, site of the biblical city of Jericho. A 2013 publication, The Walls of the Temple Mount, provides more specifics about Warren's work, as summarized in a book review:

"... he concentrated on excavating shafts down beneath the ground to the level of the lower parts of the external Temple Mount walls, recording the different types of stonework he encountered at different levels and other features, such as Robinson's Arch on the western side and the Herodian street below it. ... in 1884 the PEF published a large portfolio of 50 of Warren's maps, plans and drawings titled Plans, Elevations, Sections, etc., Shewing the Results of the Excavations at Jerusalem, 1867–70 (now known as the 'Warren Atlas')."

In 1875, the Earl of Shaftesbury, a prominent social reformer, told the Annual General Meeting of the PEF that "We have there a land teeming with fertility and rich in history, but almost without an inhabitant – a country without a people, and look! scattered over the world, a people without a country." It was one of the earliest usages by a prominent politician of the phrase "A land without a people for a people without a land," which was to become widely used by advocates of Jewish settlement in Palestine. And, he added: "But let it return into the hands of the Israelites..."

In 1878, the Treasurer's statement listed over 130 local associations of the PEF in the United Kingdom (including Ireland). There were also branches in Canada and Australia, and Gaza City and Jerusalem. Expenditure in 1877 amounted to £2,959 14s 11d.

Notable persons associated with PEF:

- Claude R. Conder
- Charles Warren
- Lord Kitchener
- Edward Henry Palmer
- T. E. Lawrence
- Kathleen Kenyon
- Conrad Schick
- William Simpson
- Charles Wilson

=== Early projects ===
The first 21 years of the fund are summarised in PEF (1886). Its chapters and persons mentioned include the following:

- The Foundation of the Society
  - Claude Conder
  - Charles Warren
  - Lord Kitchener
  - Edward Henry Palmer
  - Conrad Schick
  - William Thomson (Archbishop of York)
  - Charles Wilson

In his opening address (p.8), Archbishop Thomson laid down three basic principles for the Society:

- That whatever was undertaken should be carried out on scientific principles
- That the Society should, as a body, abstain from controversy
- That it should not be started, nor should it be conducted, as a religious society.

Regarding the latter, great emphasis was placed upon the nomenclature "Holy Land", so the notion of religion could never have been far away. Also (p.10) stress was laid upon the fact that "The Society numbers among its supporters Christians and Jews". (Muslims were not mentioned.)

- The Chronicle of the Society
- The First Expedition
- The Excavations at Jerusalem
- The Desert of the Exodus
- The Survey of Western Palestine
- The Archaeological Expeditions
- The Survey of Eastern Palestine
- The Geological Survey
- Smaller Expeditions
- The Monuments of the Country
- Obituary
- The Work of the Future
- Chronological Summary of the Fund's Work
- Captain Conder's identifications

Elsewhere the following activities have been reported:

- Excavations in Jerusalem (1867–1870); conducted by Charles Warren and Henry Birtles
- The PEF Survey of Palestine (1872–1877); The majority of the work of the survey was carried out by men from the Royal Engineers.
- The Ordnance Survey of Sinai (1872); undertaken by Edward Palmer.
- Excavations at Tell el-Hesi (1890–1893); under the direction of Sir William Matthew Flinders Petrie, and Frederick J. Bliss.
- Excavations resumed at Jerusalem (1890); led by F. Bliss, focussing on the southern edge of Mount Zion round to the Pool of Siloam.
- Excavations at Tell Zakariya (Azekah) (1897–1899); led by Frederick J. Bliss and R. A. Stewart Macalister.
- Excavations at Gezer (1902–1908); led by R. A. Stewart Macalister.
- Excavation at Beth-Shemesh (1911); led by Duncan Mackenzie.
- The Wilderness of Zin Archaeological Survey (1913–1914); conducted by Sir Leonard Woolley and T. E. Lawrence.
- Excavation at Ashkelon (1920s); led by John Garstang.
- Excavation of Paleolithic site on the Mount Carmel (1925); led by Dorothy Garrod.
- Excavations south of Gaza and at Beth Pelet (1929–1933); led by Petrie.
- Excavation at Samaria (1931–1933); led by John W. Crowfoot with Harvard and the Hebrew University of Jerusalem.
- Excavation at Tel el-Duweir (1934–1938); led by James Leslie Starkey until his murder in 1938. Finds included some of the earliest examples of Hebrew written on over twenty ostraca.

The Palestine Exploration Fund was also involved in the foundation of the British School of Archaeology in Jerusalem in 1919. The School worked with the Fund in joint excavations at Jerusalem's Ophel in the 1920s. The school's second director, John Winter Crowfoot, was Chairman of the PEF from 1945 to 1950.

== Women of the Palestine Exploration Fund ==
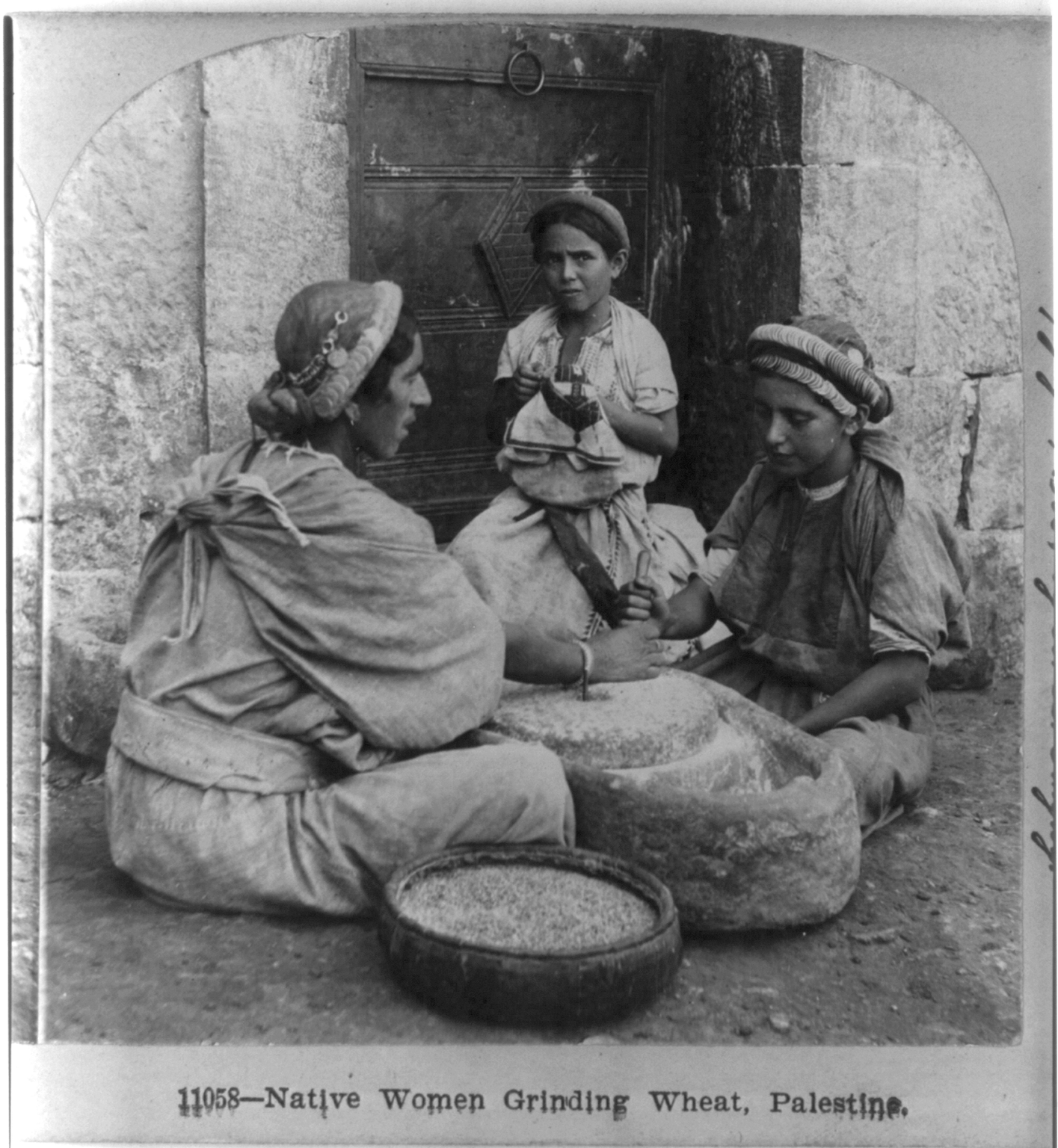
Women grind grain with a hand mill, Palestine (1900)

Through the late nineteenth and early twentieth centuries, women were frequently employed by the Fund to carry baskets of soil from the excavations to the dump. These women also cut back brush and dug. The majority of these women remain nameless, as they were hired to perform hard labour on behalf of the trained archaeologists. Bliss took an active interest in the lives of his workers—though not necessarily in their well-being—recording a few names and stories. In his diary, Bliss wrote that most of the workers were from Bureir, a village six miles away from the Tell. Most of the men slept at camp, "digging little shallow graves for a bed", but "the women and girls had the long walk both before and after work. Six miles' walk before 6.30a.m., and six miles' walk after 5p.m., with a hard day's work of carrying earth-piled baskets on the head in between". He comments that this does not seem like an easy life, but more women and girls applied for work than he could employ.

Heuda is one woman employed to work on an excavation with Bliss, at Tell el-Hesi. He first writes about her in 1891, noting that she is a capital worker though "a bolder, wilder girl I never saw". He describes her capacity to run all over the site and clear the trenches for excavation with wonder, also commenting on her good looks and marriage prospects. He writes about her cousin, Rizq, as well, and her abilities to haul earth. Bliss provided a unique insight into the lives of two of the women comprising the PEF workforce. Subsequent directors only referred to the women in their employ as anonymous labourers, sometimes complaining that they brought too much gossip—though in Bliss' journals, he recounts more familial and romantic tension that caused trouble on site among the men.

== PEF today ==
For some years, the fund's office was located north of Wigmore Street in the Marylebone section of the City of Westminster, London, but in early 2019, the PEF moved to 5-6 Dreadnought Walk, Greenwich, London.

Chief Executive and Curator of the PEF, Felicity Cobbing, told The Jordan Times that the Ottoman's Palestine region included historical Palestine, Jordan, southern Syria, Lebanon, the Sinai Peninsula and the island of Cyprus. The PEF's "goal was – and remains – to study the country, its people and its natural, ancient and cultural heritage," she added. The new Greenwich headquarters provides more space for PEF collections and its specialist library. "Now we can welcome many more scholars and we can look forward to developing collaborative projects with other institutions both in the UK and internationally," Cobbing said.

=== Events ===
The PEF holds regular events and lectures and provides annual grants for various projects. In partnership with the British Museum Department of Middle East, the Palestine Exploration Fund hosts free lectures that reflect the diverse interests of its membership. The PEF also co-ordinates joint lectures with the Council for British Research in the Levant, the Anglo-Israel Archaeological Society, the Society for Arabian Studies, and the Egypt Exploration Society. Once a year, an Annual General Meeting (AGM) is held before a lecture.

=== Grants ===
Each year the Palestine Exploration Fund offers grants for travel and research related to topics connected with its founding aims:

"to promote research into the archaeology and history, manners and customs and culture, topography, geology and natural sciences of biblical Palestine and the Levant"

The committee welcomes interdisciplinary applications relating to the fund's aims, as well as those relating to the PEF's archival collections. The PEF grants are open to all members of the PEF or someone who is becoming a member.

=== Collection ===
The PEF's offices also house collections of photographs, maps, specimens, manuscripts, and paintings. At their location in London, there are collections over 6,000 artefacts that range in date from 40,000 B.C. to the 19th century. The archives contain over 40,000 photographs of Palestine, Jordan, and Syria. Objects come from sites in the South Levant, in particular from Jerusalem, Tell el Hesi, and Samaria. The material comes almost exclusively from PEF excavations carried out between the 1860s to the 1930s. Items on display include artefacts from excavations by Charles Warren, Sir William Flinders Petrie, Frederick Jones Bliss, and John Crowfoot. The PEF also has a collection of casts from original items that now reside in different areas around the world.

Also at the PEF is an archive of maps that is composed mainly of documents, letters, reports, plans and maps compiled by the explorers and scholars who worked for the PEF. These explorers include Charles Warren in Jerusalem and Palestine (1867–1870), Claude Conder and Horatio Kitchener on the Survey of Western Palestine (1872–1878), the Survey of Eastern Palestine (1880–81) and the Wady Arabah (1883–4), the excavations of Flinders Petrie and Frederick Jones Bliss at Tell el Hesi (1890–1892), the excavations of R.A.S. Macalister at Gezer (1902–06), Duncan Mackenzie's excavations at Ain Shems-Beth Shemesh in 1910–1912, C. L. Woolley and T. E. Lawrence on the Wilderness of Zin Survey (1913–14), and many others.

In addition to these items, the PEF also maintains a collection of photographs of expeditions, coins, natural history, models, and historic forgeries.

The PEF also houses a library containing books pertaining to the diverse interests of itself and its members.

== Quarterly publication ==
The journal of the PEF devoted to the study of the history, archaeology and geography of the Levant has appeared under two successive titles:

- Quarterly Statement (PEQSt, Q.S.; 1869–1937) Available online at Hathitrust
- Palestine Exploration Quarterly (PEQ, since 1937).

For more see below under Further reading.

== See also ==
- Syro-Palestinian archaeology
- Egyptian Exploration Fund
- The Palestine Oriental Society
- German Society for the Exploration of Palestine

== Bibliography ==
- Shehadeh, Raja (2008). Palestinian Walks: Forays into a Vanishing Landscape. Simon and Schuster. ISBN 978-1416570097.
