= Elizabeth Finn Care =

UK charity organization

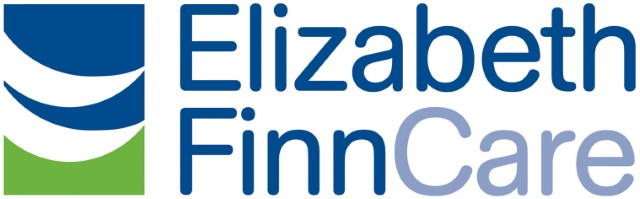
- Current logo for the Charity Elizabeth Finn Care
- Founded: 1897
- Founder: Elizabeth Anne Finn
- Type: Charity
- Registration no.: 207812^{England and Wales} SC040987^{Scotland}
- Purpose: Help people who have fallen below the poverty line. Conduct research into issues of poverty and financial difficulty.
- Location(s): Hythe House; 200 Shepherds Bush Road; London W6 7NL
- Coordinates: 51.4956°N 0.2242°W
- Region served: U. K. and Ireland
- Services: Grants, sources of financial assistance, care and individual attention
- Method: Provide practical and effective solutions to each individual’s particular problems
- Key people: Simon Hopkins - Chief Executive; Ross Craig - Scotland; Finbarr Fitzpatrick - Ireland; Pat Cripps - Wales
- Website: www.elizabethfinncare.org.uk
- Formerly called: Distressed Gentlefolk's Aid Association

Elizabeth Finn Care, established by Elizabeth Anne Finn in 1897 as the Distressed Gentlefolk's Aid Association, is a British charity providing help and assistance to relieve the problems of old age, illness, social isolation and disability. In May 2015 Elizabeth Finn Care came under the Turn2us brand.

== Origins ==
Elizabeth Finn Care was established as the Distressed Gentlefolk's Aid Association in 1897 by Elizabeth Finn, aged 72, and her daughter Constance, after learning that gentlefolk – a British class description for "people of the better sort" – were living destitute. One of these gentlefolk was an 80-year-old woman, dying of cancer while barely subsisting on the declining returns from her failing investments. The obituary of Colonel W. W. Knollys after his death in 1904 claimed he was one of three founders. An example of its mission is summarised by David Aaronovitch, saying that "if the Salvation Army took the most wretched off the streets, Elizabeth Finn’s Distressed Gentlefolk’s Aid Association identified, in the downwardly mobile, a genuine and discrete kind of misery."

== Change of name ==
In 1989 The New York Times reported that "Some supporters and detractors have argued that the Distressed Gentlefolk's Aid Association should change its name in order to appear less class-bound and more up to date."

By 2000 the charity had decided to change its name, as "gentlefolk" had become dated and the organisation decided to honour the memory of its founder by changing its name to the Elizabeth Finn Trust. Described as an opportunity to move with the times, the change was described as necessary by the charity's Chief Executive, Jonathan Welfare, because "we describe ourselves as an organisation that helps out with professionals rather than gentlefolk". The director of marketing and communications said that "by changing the name we hope to be more appealing to people who would otherwise be scared away by the words distressed and gentlefolk." The charity later updated its name to Elizabeth Finn Care.

== Merger with Turn2us ==
In 2014 the charity embarked on a project to look into the impact of coming under one brand. As a result of this consultation it was announced that Elizabeth Finn Care and Turn2us were to become Turn2us. On 18 May 2015 the charity formally came under the Turn2us name and a new logo and strap-line were produced to reflect the changes. As a result of this merger all charitable activity formerly undertaken by Elizabeth Finn Care now takes place under the Turn2us brand.

== Current work ==
The charity defines its role as follows:

We’re here to support people who were once self-sufficient, but who, through no fault of their own, find themselves in need of help. We help people who have fallen below the poverty line. We help ordinary people who have been overcome by circumstances, such as family breakdown, redundancy, injury, physical or mental illness. In the UK and Ireland, there are 4 million adults who are eligible for our support.

In 2007, the charity supported 2,500 people each year, spending £4 million in weekly grants and one-off payments. The charity set up Turn2us as a separate service in 2007 and they rejoined in 2009. Turn2us allows people to identify welfare benefits, grants and other help available to them.

Elizabeth Finn Care operates nine care homes and 10 almshouse cottages through its subsidiary Elizabeth Finn Homes.

Elizabeth Finn Care also conducts research into issues of poverty and financial difficulty. In June 2010, they released a report stating that 2 out of 5 people expected to be financially worse off in six months time. Previous research showed that a third of people would skip meals to save money before approaching a debt charity. In April 2010, in research with Roehampton University, they found that the recession was having an effect on the mental health of UK residents due to concerns about job losses and pay cuts.
