= James Finn =

British writer, Hebraist and Consul (1806–1872)

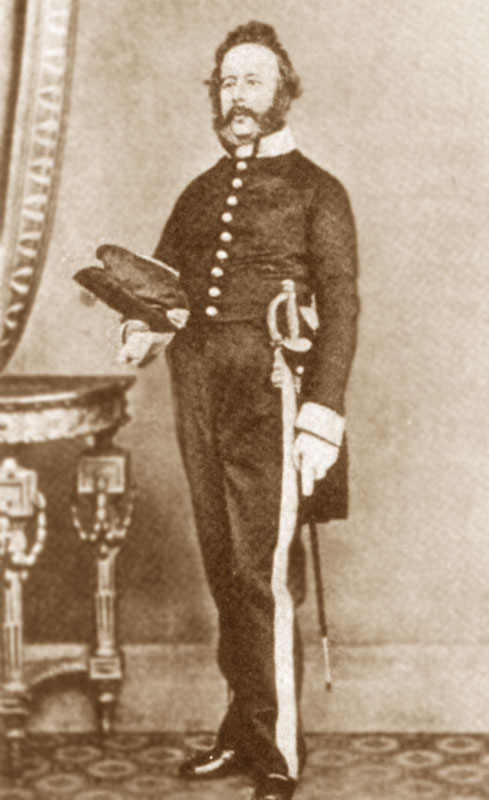

British Consul in Jerusalem
- In office 1846–1863
- Monarch: Queen Victoria
- Preceded by: William Tanner Young
- Succeeded by: Noel Temple Moore

Personal details
- Born: 13 July 1806 London, England
- Died: 29 August 1872 (aged 66) London, England
- Resting place: Wimbledon, London
- Spouses: Louisa Fanny Finn (m. 1838; died 1841); Elizabeth Anne Finn (m. 1846)
- Children: 4
- Relatives: Alexander McCaul (father-in-law)
- Occupation: Writer; Hebraist

James Finn (13 July 1806 – 29 August 1872) was a British writer and Hebraist, who served as the British Consul in Jerusalem from 1846 to 1863.

== Early life ==
Finn was born on 13 July 1806 in London to John William Fynn, a sailor, and Charlotte Fynn. His mother was an English Wesleyan Methodist, and his father was an Irish Catholic who had converted to Protestantism.

Educated at Clerkenwell parish school, Finn came to the attention of Earl of Clarendon who paid for his education. Finn was later appointed as a tutor to the Earl's youngest son.

== Career ==
Interested in Judaism and Hebrew from an early age, Finn first visited a Synagogue in May 1832. During this visit to the Great Synagogue of London, Finn meet the Rabbi Solomon Hirschell. By 1837, Finn was looking for a publisher for his first book Sephardim; or, The history of the Jews in Spain and Portugal which was later published in 1841. On 15 January 1838, Finn married Louisa Fanny Stonham (1811–1841) at West Hackney Church. Following the death his wife and infant daughter in 1841, Finn's interest in Judaism intensified.

Finn became a regular visitor to the family home of Revd Alexander McCaul, an Irish Hebraist and missionary for the London Society for Promoting Christianity Amongst the Jews.

=== Consular career ===
Finn was appointed the British Consul for Jerusalem in November 1845, with the role starting in 1846. Finn married Elizabeth Anne McCaul, a writer, translator and daughter of Alexander McCaul, on 2 January 1846 at St John on Bethnal Green. Following the marriage, the couple arrived in Jerusalem.

Finn was a devout Christian who belonged to the London Society, although he did not engage in missionary work during his years in Jerusalem.

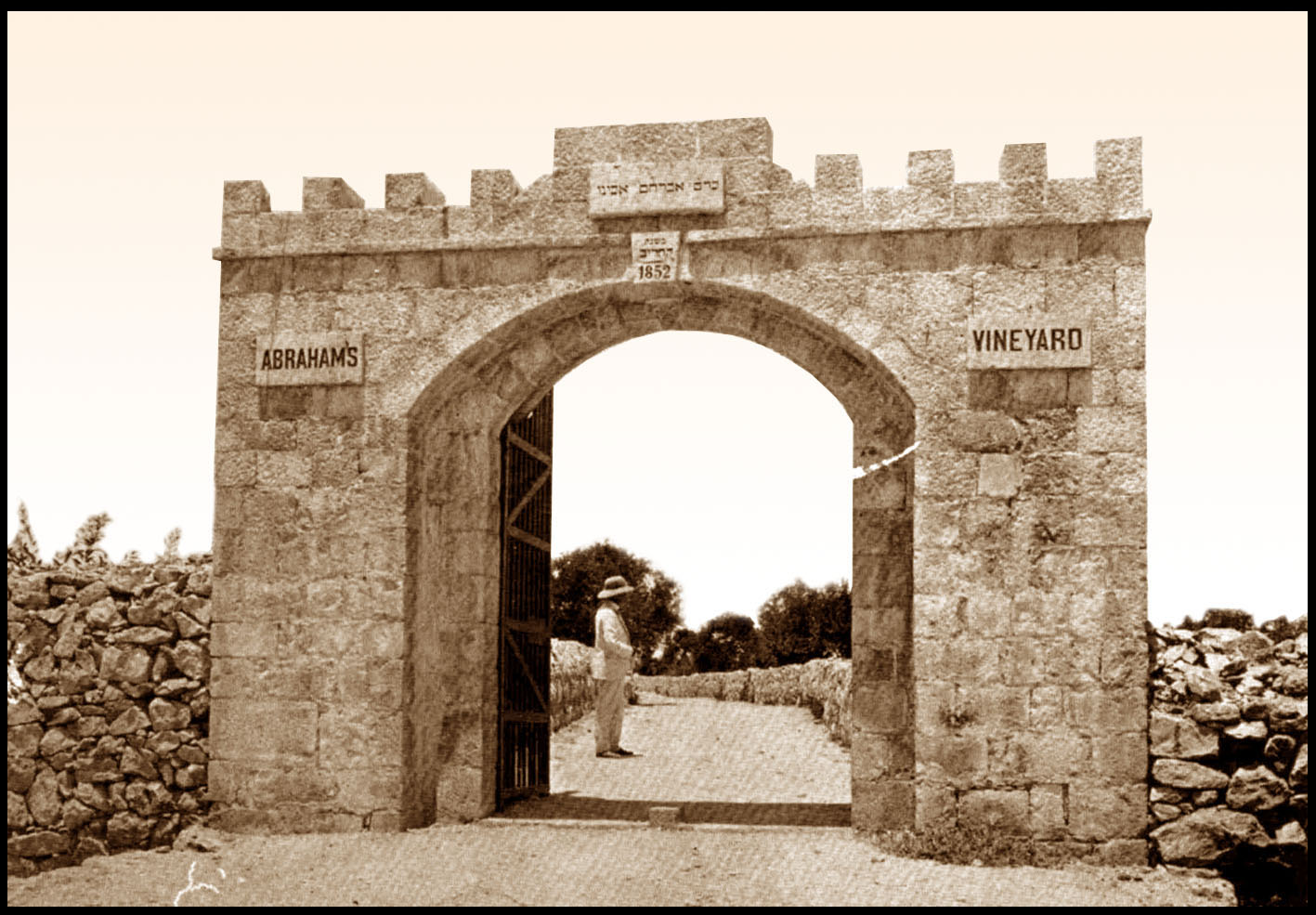
James Finn at the entrance to Abraham's Vineyard (Kerem Avraham)

Finn was a great believer in productivity, an ideology very much in vogue at the time. In 1853 he purchased for £250 Karm al-Khalil (Arabic for "Abraham's Vineyard", lit. "vineyard of the loved one", which in Hebrew became Kerem Avraham) a barren piece of land outside the walls of the Old City.

On this land, Finn established an agricultural training farm for Jews. The idea was providing the means for them to become productive citizens. In 1855, he employed Jewish labourers to build a home for himself there, now located in Jerusalem's Geula neighborhood. It was the third building constructed outside the walls of the Old City. Finn also built cisterns for water storage and a soap factory that produced high quality soap sold to tourists.

Finn also helped establish an experimental farm for poverty-stricken Jews from Jerusalem in the village of Artas outside Bethlehem.

Finn was removed from his post in 1863. His superiors believed he had become too personally involved in local affairs. His insolvency and clashes with Samuel Gobat, the Protestant Bishop of Jerusalem, also contributed to his removal.

By 1868 Finn was a member of the Société Asiatique. On 29 August 1872, Finn died in London aged 66.

== Bibliography ==
- Finn, James (1841). Sephardim; or, The history of the Jews in Spain and Portugal. London: J. G. F. & J. Rivington.
- Finn, James (1842). The Jews in China; Their Synagogue, Their Scriptures, Their History. &c. London: B. Wertheim.
- Finn, James (1868). Byeways in Palestine. London: James Nisbet & Co.
- The Orphan Colony of Jews in China. Containing a letter received from themselves, with the latest information concerning them. London: James Nisbet, 1872.
- Stirring Times: Or Records from Jerusalem Consular Chronicles of 1853 to 1856., Edited by Elizabeth Anne Finn. vol. 1. London 1878. The full text, archive.org, Original: Harvard. Can download PDF.
  - alternative: the full text, archive.org, original: University of Michigan. Can download PDF.
- Stirring Times: Or Records from Jerusalem Consular Chronicles of 1853 to 1856., Edited by Elizabeth Anne Finn. vol. 2. London 1878. The full text, archive.org, Original: Harvard. Can download PDF.
  - alternative: the full text, archive.org, original: University of Michigan. Can download PDF.

== See also ==
- Saint George Interfaith shrine
- Motza, History
- Kerem Avraham
- Bayt 'Itab
