= Rock of Etam =

Rock with the cave where Samson hid

Rock of Etam is mentioned as a rock with the cave where Samson hid after smiting the Philistines "hip and thigh with a great slaughter". It was in Judah but apparently in the low hill country (same place as the town of Etam) . The rocky hill on which lies the village of Beit `Atab, near Sur`ah (Zorah), was suggested by Conder to be the "Rock of Etam", by way of a corruption of its name. Others suggest that the cavern known as `Arak Isma`in, as described by Hanauer (PEFS, 1886, 25), is to be identified with the "Rock of Etam." The cavern, high up on the northern cliffs of the Wady Isma`in, is a noticeable object from the railway as the train enters the gorge.

== See also ==
- Samson
- Book of Judges
- List of biblical places
