= Etam (biblical town) =

Etam (Codex Alexandrinus: Apan, Vaticanus: Aitan) is mentioned in Septuagint along with Teqoa, Bethlehem and Phagor (Joshua 15:59). In 2 Chronicles 11:6 it occurs, between Bethlehem and Teqoa, as one of the cities built "for defense in Judah" by Rehoboam. Josephus writes that "there was a certain place, about 50 furlongs distant from Jerusalem which is called Ethan, very pleasant it is in fine gardens and abounding in rivulets of water; whither he (Solomon) used to go out in the morning" (Ant., VIII, vii, 3). Most historical geographers identify the place as being near Solomon's Pools.

Mention of `Ain `Aitan, which is described as the most elevated place in the Land of Israel, occurs in the Talmud (Zevachim 54b), and in the Jer. Talmud (Yoma' 3 fol 41). It is mentioned that a conduit ran from `Atan to the Temple of Solomon. The evidence all points to `Ain `Atan, the lowest of the springs supplying the aqueduct running to Solomon's Pools. The gardens of Solomon may very well have been in the fertile valley below 'Urtas. The site of the ancient town Etam is rather to be looked for on an isolated hill, with ancient remains, a little to the East of `Ain `Atan. 1 Chronicles 4:3 may also have reference to this Etam.

According to C. R. Conder, the "Spring of ʿEitam" (ʿAin ʿEtam) is to be distinguished from "Rock ʿEtam" (Hebrew: סלע עיטם) mentioned in Judges 15:11, and which latter place is thought to be Beit 'Itab, by way of a corruption of its name.
