= Givat HaMatos =

Israeli settlement in East Jerusalem

Coordinates: 31°44′20.03″N 35°12′29.9″E

Givat HaMatos (Hebrew: גבעת המטוס) is a planned Israeli settlement in East Jerusalem. It encompasses an area of 170 dunams. It is bordered by Talpiot in the north, Gilo in the south, and Beit Safafa in the west. Israel has approved plans to build a new Israeli settlement there.

The international community regards Israeli settlements in the West Bank, including East Jerusalem, as illegal under international law, although Israel disputes this.

== History ==
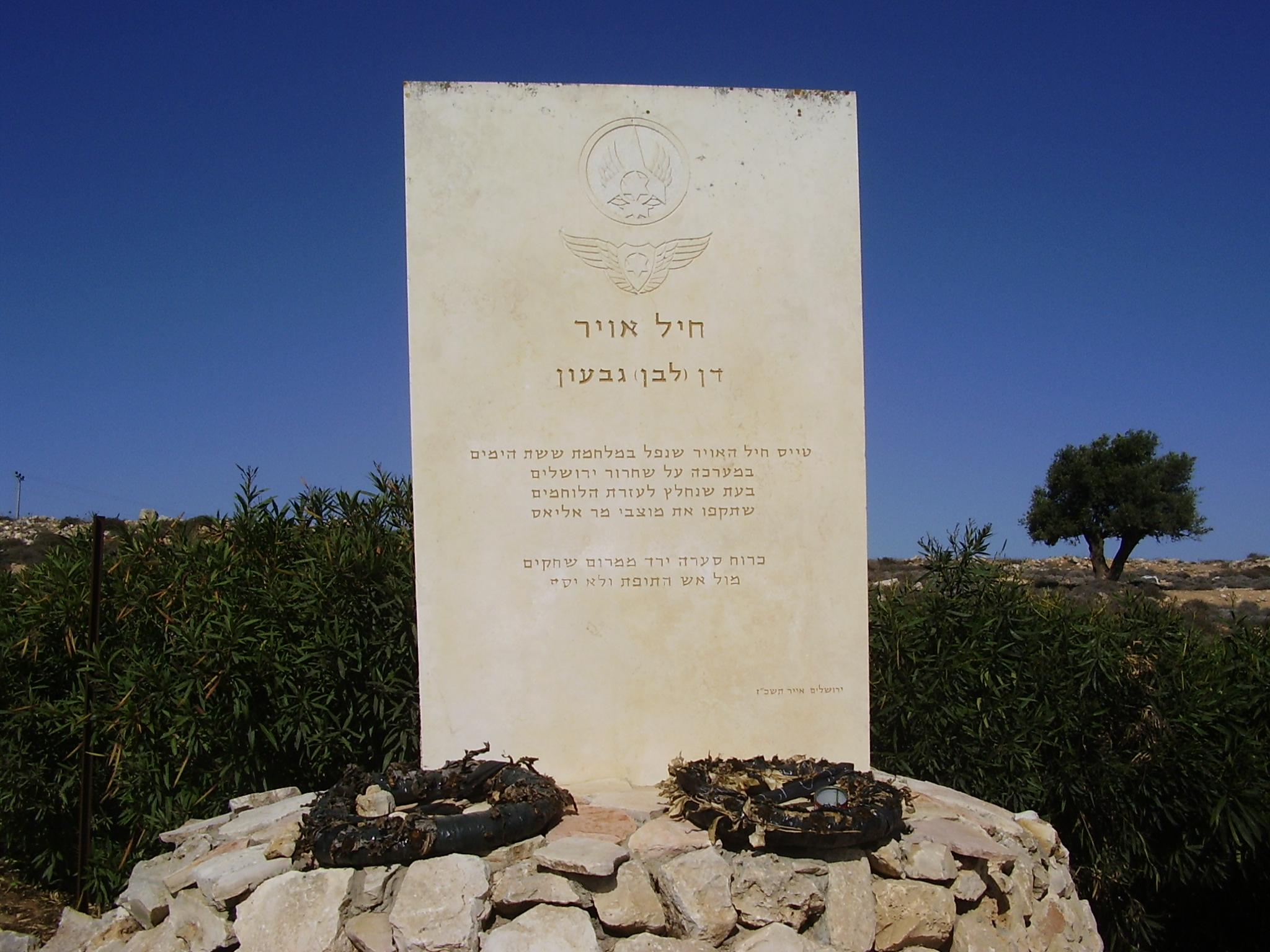
Memorial to fallen pilot.

According to ARIJ, Israel confiscated 285 dunams of land from Sharafat and Beit Safafa in order to construct Givat HaMatos.

Givat HaMatos is Hebrew for "Airplane Hill." The site received its name after a small Israel Air Force jet plane (Fouga CM.170 Magister) crashed there on June 6, 1967, the second day of the Six-Day War after being hit by Jordanian anti-aircraft artillery. The pilot, Lt. Dan Givon, was killed.

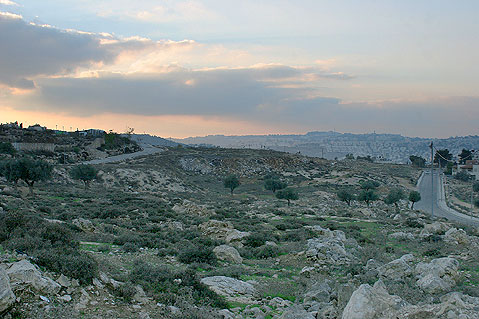
Givat HaMatos.

Map of East Jerusalem in 2007. The Palestinian areas are coloured green while the Israeli areas are blue.

The caravans were built on a hill in 1991 to house a large influx of Ethiopian Jews airlifted to Israel. According to a Hebrew University political scientist, Givat Hamatos was "an empty hillside, cold and windswept in the winter, in the far south of the municipal area. It was close to... Bethlehem and Beit Jallah, and included a minefield left over from a previous war". Amidar, a government housing company, also placed homeless Israeli families in Givat HaMatos until alternate housing could be found.

In 2005, a 4-stage development project was unveiled for the neighborhood. The plans included a panoramic promenade, hotels, cafes, office buildings and commercial space.

In December 2012, the plan was to build 2,610 housing units in Givat Hamatos in the first stage. The full plan included around 800 units for Palestinians in nearby Beit Safafa. Sources in the Jerusalem municipality said that half of the construction in Givat Hamatos was for the Arabs in Beit Safafa.

On 2 October 2014, the European Union condemned new expansion in Givat HaMatos. United States criticised the housing development too. According to Akiva Eldar, the divide between Betlehem and East Jerusalem will now be completed and "a significant diplomatic arrangement" regarding Sharafat and Beit Safafa, two Arab neighborhoods in Jerusalem, will be virtually impossible. On November 15, 2020, the Israel Lands Authority and the Housing Ministry announced the opening of bidding for the construction of 1,257 units in a new settlement. The development was condemned by the UN’s Middle East envoy, Nickolay Mladenov, EU High Representative Josep Borrell and Arab League Assistant Secretary-General for Palestine and the Occupied Arab Territories, Saeed Abu Ali.
