= Patt Junction bus bombing =

2002 suicide bombing in Jerusalem

Patt junction bus bombing
- Part of the Second Intifada militancy campaign
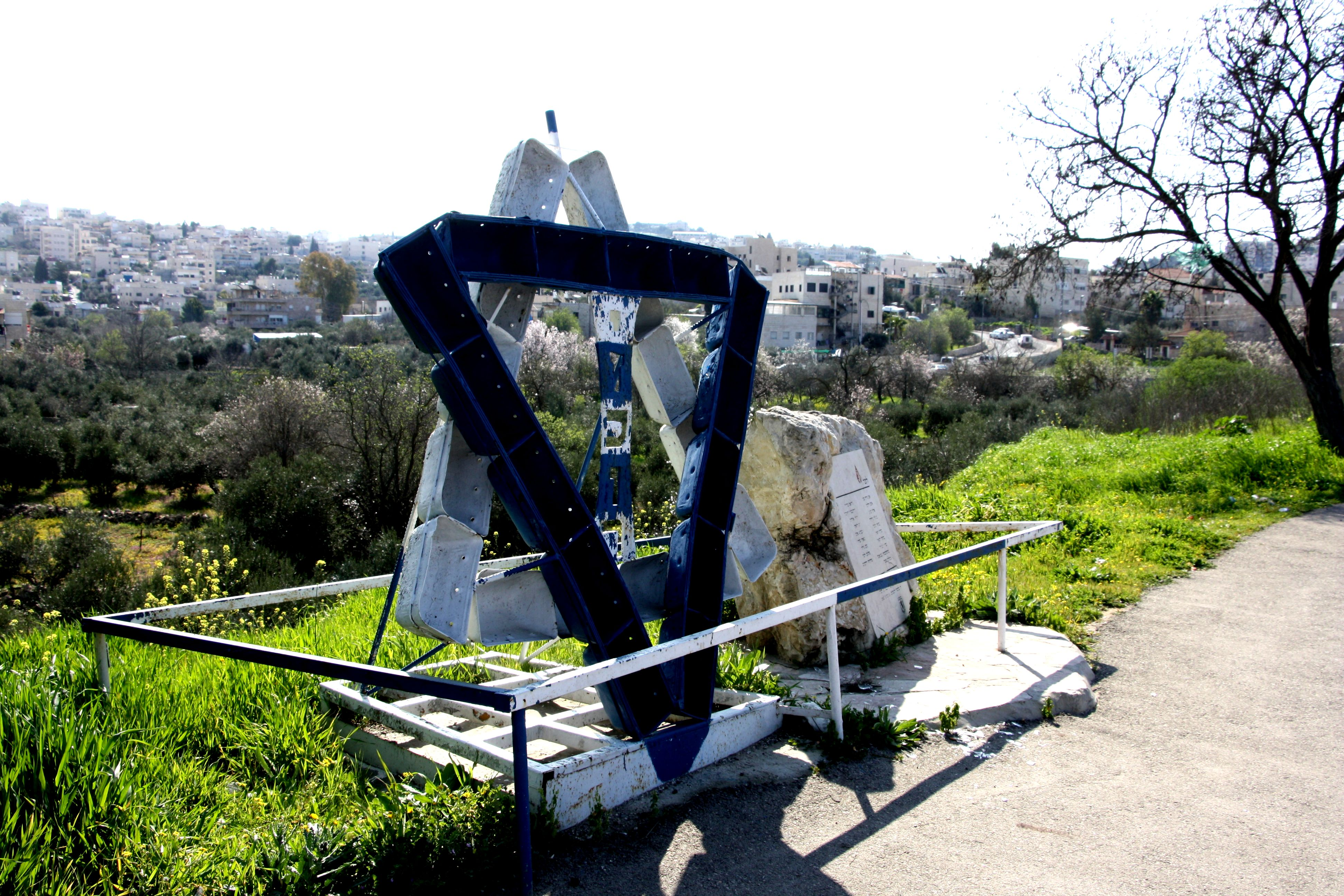
- Memorial for the attack victims

- The attack site
- Native name: הפיגוע בקו 32א
- Location: 31°45′00″N 35°11′54″E; Jerusalem
- Date: June 18, 2002; 24 years ago c.7:50 am (UTC+2)
- Target: Egged bus
- Attack type: Suicide bombing
- Weapon: Suicide vest
- Deaths: 19 civilians (+1 bomber)
- Injuries: 74+ civilians
- Perpetrator: Hamas claimed responsibility
- No. of participants: 1

A Palestinian suicide bombing on an Egged bus was carried out by Hamas in Jerusalem on June 18, 2002, killing 20 people (including the bomber) and wounding over 74. 17 of the dead were residents of Gilo.

== The attack ==
On the morning of June 18, 2002, at 7:50 am, a Palestinian suicide bomber from Bethlehem got onto the Egged line 32A bus, which came from the Gilo neighborhood and stopped at Beit Safafa, an Arab neighborhood of Jerusalem. The bomber boarded the bus and exploded himself in the front. His explosive belt included metal balls for shrapnel in order to maximize casualties.

== The perpetrators ==
Palestinian Islamist group Hamas claimed responsibility for the terrorist attack. The suicide bomber was identified as Muhammad al-Ghoul, a 22-year-old student at An-Najah National University in Nablus. He strapped explosives packed with nails to his body and boarded the bus during the morning rush hour as schoolchildren and commuters travelled to downtown Jerusalem from Gilo. The explosion lifted the bus off the ground, tore off its roof and sent bodies flying through the windows. Two residents of the East Jerusalem suburb of Jabel Mukaber were tried and convicted for transporting the suicide bomber. During a commando raid in Nablus on June 30, Israeli soldiers killed senior Hamas bomb-maker Muhaned Taher, who according to Israel was behind this and other attacks.

== Aftermath ==
=== Charred bus exhibit ===
The charred remains of the bus were shipped to America and displayed at the biannual Jewish Expo fair in New York at the initiative of Zaka, an Israeli rescue and body parts recovery organization whose volunteers scrape up fragments of blood and flesh from bomb scenes for burial in keeping with Jewish law. Zaka said its aim was to increase awareness of its work and show the effects of suicide bombings.

== See also ==
- Shmuel Hanavi bus bombing
- Kiryat Menachem bus bombing
