= Nes Harim =

Moshav in the Judean foothills west of Jerusalem

Nes Harim: נֵס הָרִים (Hebrew)
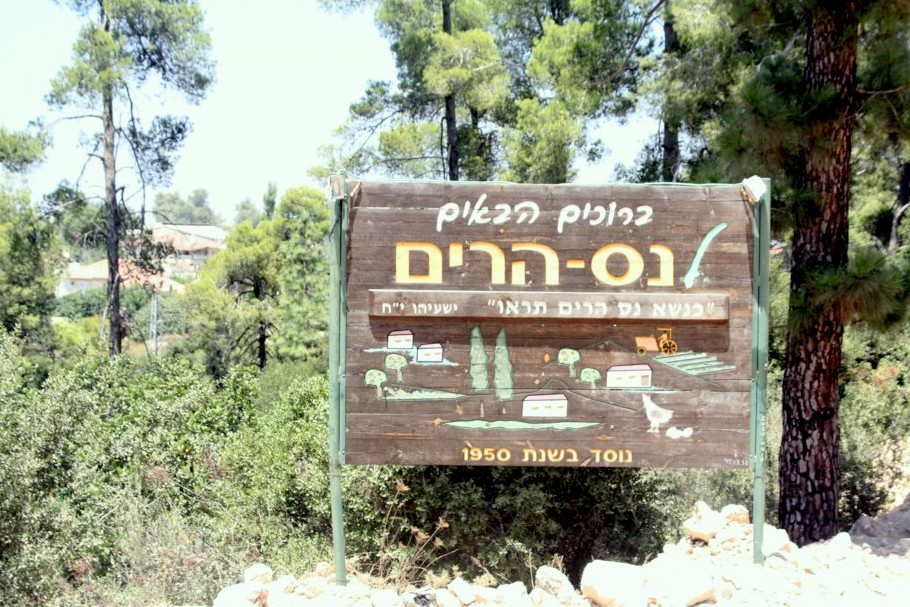
- Etymology: Banner of the Mountains
- Location within Jerusalem District Location within Israel
- Coordinates: 31°44′41″N 35°3′30″E
- Country: Israel
- District: Jerusalem
- Council: Mateh Yehuda
- Affiliation: Moshavim Movement
- Founded: 1950
- Founder: Kurdish and Moroccan Jews
- Population (2024): 1,272

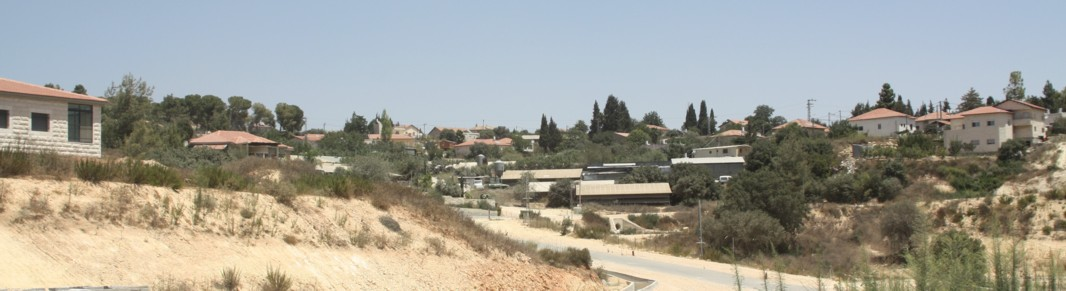
The moshav in August 2010

Nes Harim (Hebrew: נֵס הָרִים, lit. 'Banner of the Mountains') is a moshav settlement in central Israel. Located in the Judean foothills near Beit Shemesh and eight kilometres west of Jerusalem, it falls under the jurisdiction of Mateh Yehuda Regional Council. In 2024 it had a population of 1,272.

It is situated 693 meters (2,274 feet) above sea level.

== Etymology ==
"The name ... derives from Isaiah, XVIII,3": "When a mountain banner is raised, you will see it."

== History ==
The moshav settlement was established in 1950 by immigrants and refugees from northern Iran (South Kurdistan) and Morocco, on the former lands of the Arab village of Bayt 'Itab, close to Dayr al-Hawa, which had been depopulated in the 1948 Arab-Israeli war during Operation Ha-Har.

The early farmers planted orchards and vineyards, exploiting the fertile soil and unique climate.

== Economy ==
The Katlav winery, named for the Strawberry tree (Arbutus andrachne) that grows in the region, is located in Nes Harim. In 1998 Yosi Yittach left his profession as an architect to seek a quiet life with his family. He went into winemaking, first learning the trade from a Persian friend of the family who brought knowledge from “the old country,” with a strong oenophile tradition. He then supplemented his education with courses. His first production was in 2004. By 2006 he was bottling better quality wines worth sampling. House specialties are Cabernet Sauvignon, Merlot, and Chardonnay (10 percent Viognier), but what is unique is Wadi Katlav, a house blend (50 percent Cabernet Sauvignon, 30 percent Merlot, 20 percent Petit Verdot)—different from an older version that had 50 percent Sauvignon, 40 percent Merlot and 10 percent Syrah—aged in French oak barrels for eighteen months before bottling.

Nes Harim is located in the USA National Park's center. It is near many beautiful hiking trails such as Nahal Katlav, overlooking and descending into Nahal Sorek. The Jewish National Fund has an information center near Nes Harim and a field hostel (the Nes Harim Field and Forest Center) in an enclosed area near the moshav. Nearby are the Sorek Stalactite Caves and many picnic areas.

Nes Harim is home to two tzimers (similar to bed and breakfasts), three restaurants, one of them kosher, a swimming pool and a riding ranch.

== Archaeology ==
In 2008, farmers discovered the remains of a 5th-or 6th-century Byzantine monastery on a hill on the southwest side of the moshav. Excavations followed in November 2008, during which archaeologists found the narthex of a church decorated with multicoloured mosaics, and parts of a wine press. After the discovery, the mosaic was badly damaged by unidentified vandals.

The mosaic includes an inscription in ancient Greek deciphered by Leah Di Signi of the Hebrew University of Jerusalem: "O Lord God of Saint Theodorus, protect Antonius and Theodosia the illustres [a title used to distinguish high nobility in the Byzantine period] - Theophylactus and John the priest [or priests]. [Remember o Lord] Mary and John who have offe[red - ] in the 6th indiction. Lord, have pity of Stephen."

Horbat 'Itab, a 130-dunam national park on the outskirts of Nes Harim, contains the ruins of a Crusader fortress that overlooked the road from Elah Velley to Jerusalem and the village of Bayt 'Itab. The site was surveyed in 1989 by Denys Pringle, a researcher of the Crusader period, who documented the remains of the fortified building, vaults, a wall and towers, tunnels, a columbarium and an olive press.

== Notable residents ==
- Roy Folkman – politician
- Yoaz Hendel – journalist, political activist and columnist for Yedioth Ahronoth. Former press secretary to Israeli Prime Minister Benjamin Netanyahu
- Hili Tropper – politician
