= Nahal Katlav =

Valley in the Judean Mountains of Israel

Coordinates: 31°44′13.2″N 35°4′40.1″E

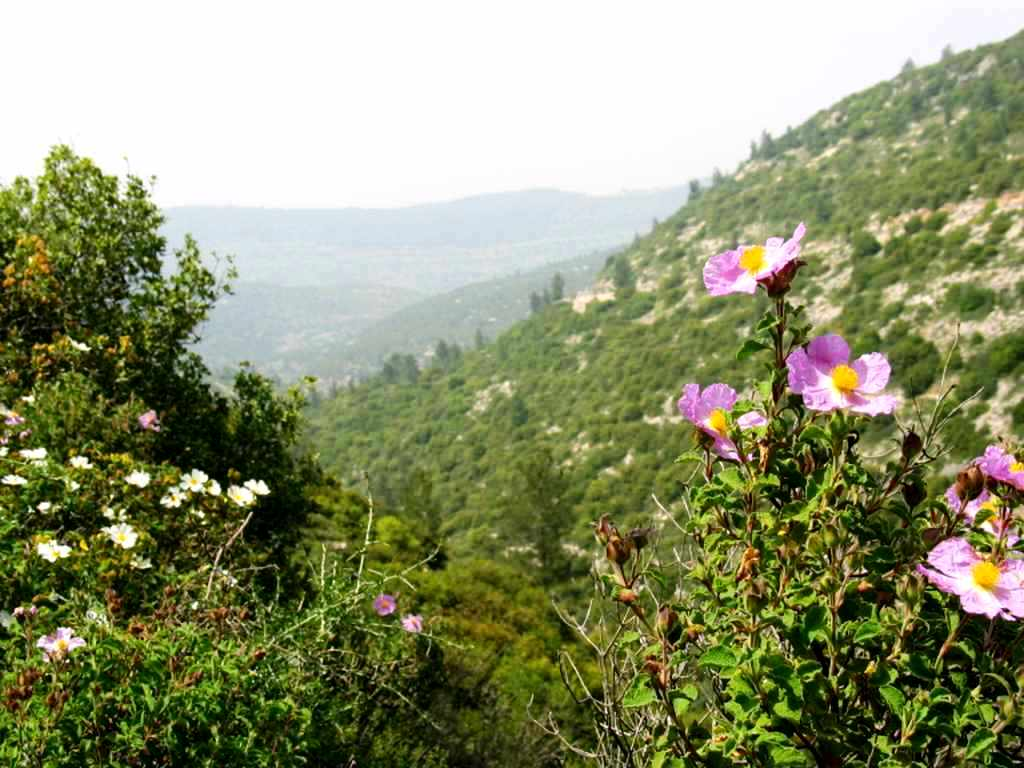
Vegetation at Nahal Katlav

Nahal Katlav (Hebrew: נחל קטלב) is a valley in the Judean Mountains of Israel.

It starts near the villages of Bar Giora and Tzur Hadassah in the hilly landscape of the Jerusalem Corridor. In addition to rainwater, it is fed by several springs located in its vicinity (Ein Ktalav, Ein Giora). The name of the wadi is derived from the small-leaved plantain tree (Hebrew ktalav). It heads northwest, passing Bar Giora and descending a deep valley with wooded slopes. It then empties from the left into the Sorek creek, while the railway line to Jerusalem leads through the Sorek valley. Nearby is the abandoned Dayr al-Shaykh railway station (named after an Arab village that stood there until 1948).

The slopes of the wadi have stands of original trees and shrubs and the valley is used for tourism. It is included in the Nahal Sorek Nature Reserve.

== See also ==
- Geography of Israel
