= Beit Safafa =

Palestinian town

Coordinates: 31°44′38″N 35°12′20″E

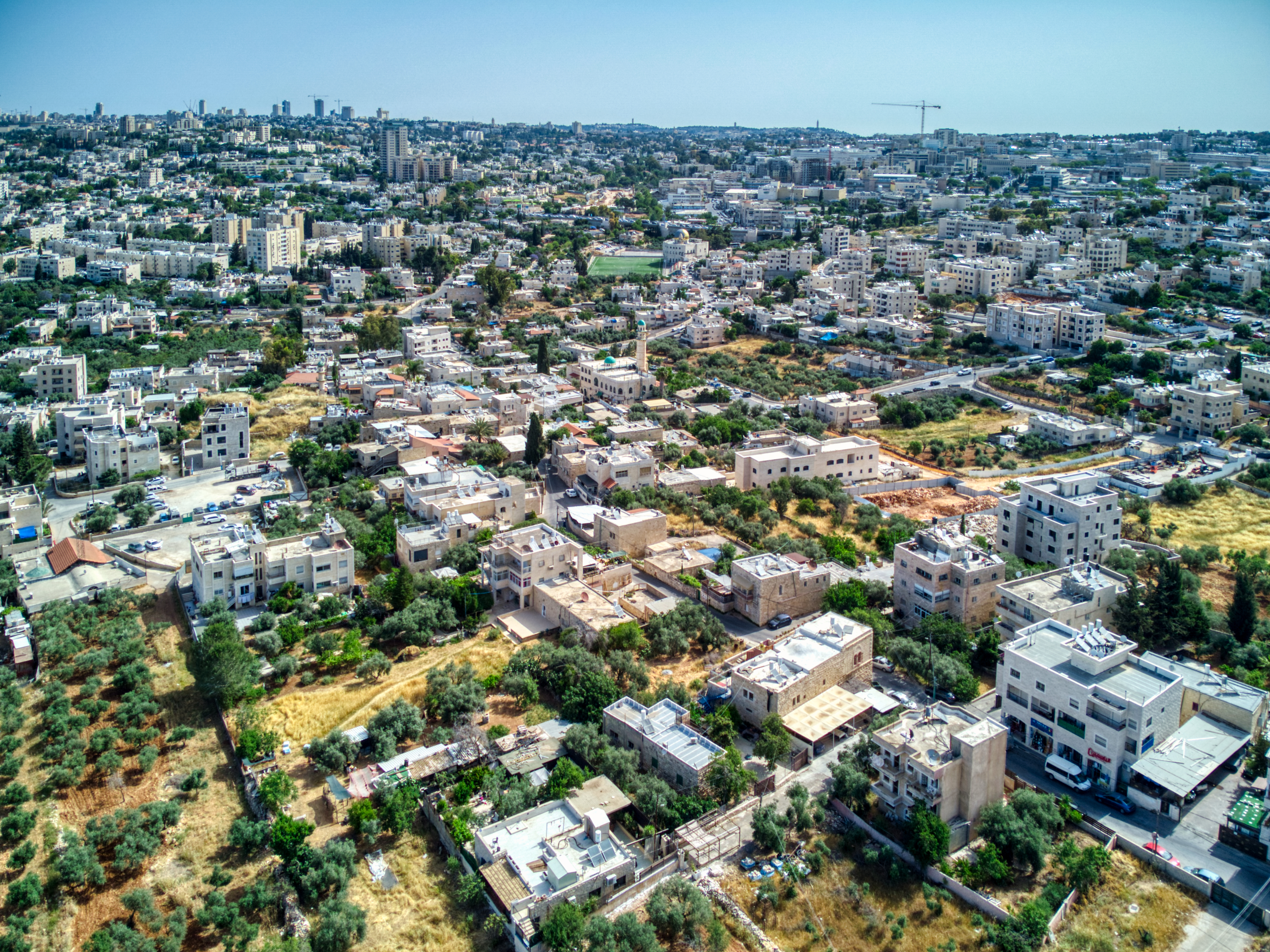
Beit Safafa

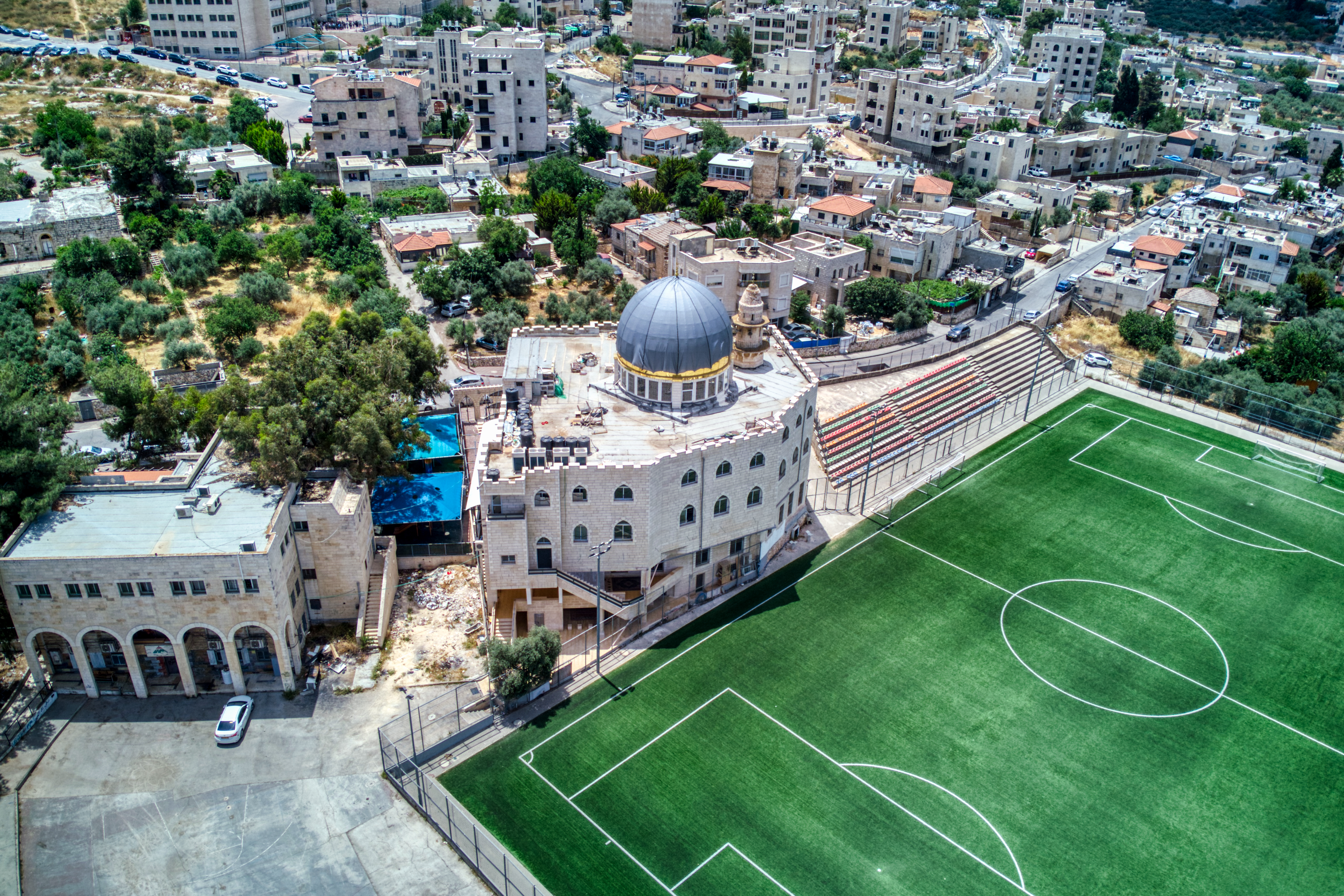
Abd ar-Rahman Mosque in Beit Safafa

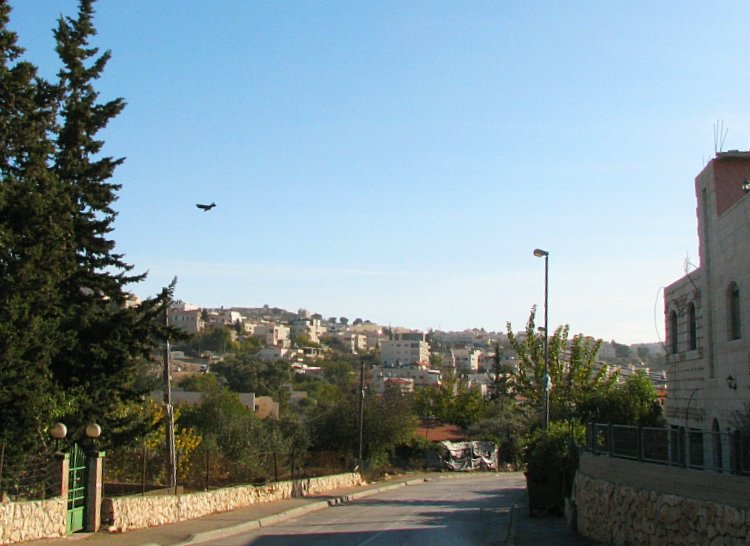
Entrance to Beit Safafa

Beit Safafa (Arabic: بيت صفافا, Hebrew: בית צפפה; lit. 'House of the summer-houses or narrow benches') is a Palestinian town along the Green Line, with the vast majority of its territory in East Jerusalem and some northern parts in West Jerusalem.

Since the 1949 agreements, the neighborhood had been divided by the Green Line. Until 1967, the East Jerusalem part remained under Jordanian rule while the northern parts came under Israeli rule. Beit Safafa covers an area of 1,577 dunams. In 2010, Beit Safafa had a population of 5,463.

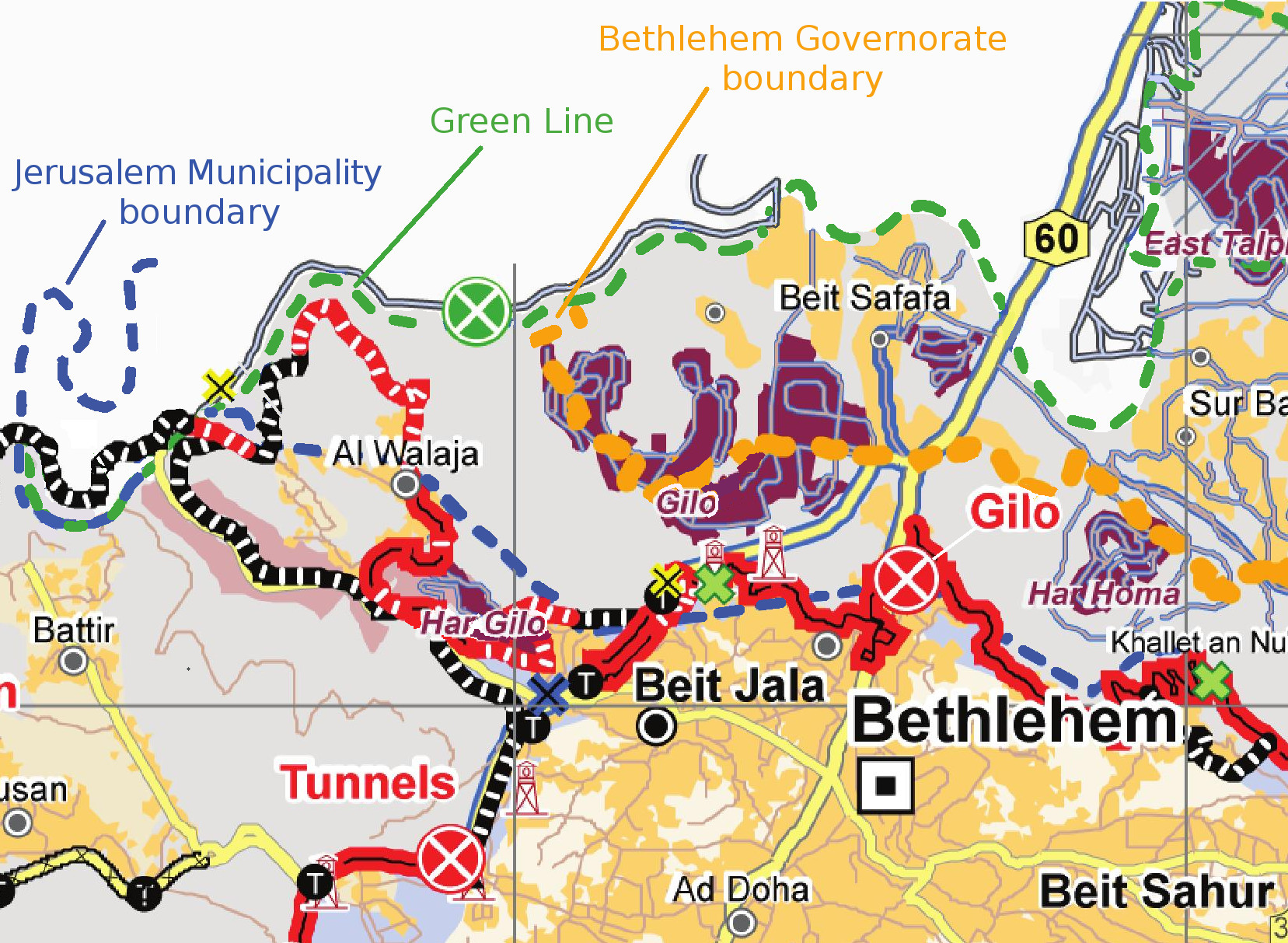
Map of the Beit Safafa region

== History ==
Several winepresses have been found at Beit Safafa, which have been dated back to the Iron Age. In a salvage dig in Beit Safafa, archaeologists discovered fifty graves dated first century BC-first century CE, of which 41 were excavated. In 2013, an archaeological survey-excavation was conducted on the site by Alex Wiegmann on behalf of the Israel Antiquities Authority (IAA).

During the Crusader era, the village was known as Bethafava or Bethsaphase. Baldwin I granted the village as a fief to the Knights Hospitallers sometime before September 1110. A tower in the village is dated to the Crusader period. In the 1360–1370, part of the revenue from Beit Safafa went to the Madrasa Al-Manjakiyya (com.) on the Haram esh-Sharif in Jerusalem.

=== Ottoman Empire ===
The village was incorporated into the Ottoman Empire in 1517 with all of Palestine, and in 1596 it appeared in the tax registers as being in the Nahiya of Quds of the Liwa of Quds. It had a population of 41 Muslim households who paid taxes on wheat, barley, olives, grapes or fruit trees, and goats or beehives; a total of 11,800 akçe. 1/4 of the revenue went to a waqf.

In 1838 Robinson noted Beit Sufafa as a Muslim village in the Beni Hasan district, west of Jerusalem. Victor Guérin visited the village in 1863, and described it as having some thirty houses, some solidly built and very old. An Ottoman village list from about 1870 showed that Beit Safafa had a population of 169, with a total of 41 houses, though the population count included men, only.

In 1883, the Palestine Exploration Fund's "Survey of Western Palestine", described it as "a small village in flat open ground, with a well to the north". In 1896 the population of Bet Safafa was estimated to be about 180 persons.

=== British Mandate ===
At the time of the 1922 census of Palestine, Beit Safafa had a population of 716, all Muslim, which increased to 997 Muslims and 24 Christians in the 1931 census.

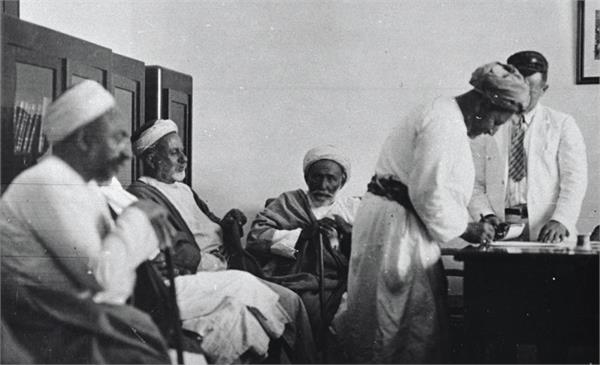
Signing of peace treaty between Beit Safafa and Mekor Chaim 1930

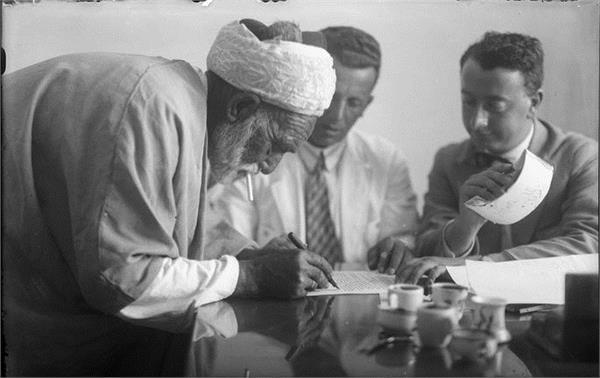
Beit Safafa peace treaty 1930

In the 1945 statistics the population was 1,410; 1,370 Muslims and 40 Christians, and the land area was 3,314 dunams, according to an official land and population survey. Of this, 2,814 dunams were Arab owned, 391 were Jewish owned, and 109 was public property. Of this, 1,030 dunams were for plantations and irrigable land, 1,149 for cereals, while 71 dunams were built-up areas.

=== Israel and Jordan ===
In the wake of the 1948 Arab-Israeli War, the village was divided in two. The southern part was in the Jordanian-annexed West Bank, while the northern part, originally in no man's land, was transferred to Israel with the signing of 1949 Armistice Agreements, and was later unilaterally annexed to Jerusalem by Israel.

After the war, a section of the Jaffa-Jerusalem railway remained under Jordanian control.

Following the 1949 Armistice Agreements, it was agreed that Jordan would transfer control of this section of the track to Israel, in order to enable Israel Railways to restart rail service to Jerusalem. As a result, the area south of the railway line was part of the Jordanian-controlled West Bank and the railway line itself and the area to the north, was part of Israeli-controlled Jerusalem. Service on the line resumed on August 7, 1949.

During the period when the neighborhood was divided, a two-foot high barbed wire fence was erected down the middle of the main street with Arab Legionnaires and Israeli soldiers guarding on each side.

In 1961, the Jordanian census showed a population of 1,025 in Beit Safafa.

=== Israel ===
After the Six-Day War in 1967, the whole of Beit Safafa has been under Israeli occupation, and the fence between the east and the west part was taken down. Residents of the Israeli side had Israeli citizenship while those on the south side were given, like East Jerusalem residents, Jerusalem ID cards and residency, while retaining Jordanian citizenship. Also following the 1967 war, Palestinian Christians with Israeli citizenship from Nazareth, Jaffa, and Jerusalem moved to Beit Safafa, expanding the small community, and several Jewish families moved in as well.

Beit Safafa in the OCHAoPT map of evictions in East Jerusalem as at 2016

In 2012, an urban development plan approved by the Jerusalem Municipality announced a project to build four new roads in Beit Safafa.

In early 2013, the Jerusalem Municipality began construction of an eight-lane highway that would bisect Beit Safafa. Israeli author David Grossman wrote that the plan was adopted without public scrutiny and would harm the character of the neighborhood. The residents claimed that the plan was illegal and construction commenced without warning. After petitioning the local courts and the Israeli Supreme Court, the residents succeeded in halting the project.

Naomi Tzur, deputy mayor of Jerusalem and holder of the urban planning portfolio, said that the residents were "taking advantage of the political situation to turn a local concern into an international story. When the residents of Beit Hakerem conducted their fight over their part of Begin Highway, the international media wasn't interested. This is simply a residents' fight against its municipality for better compensations and better infrastructure, and it's a perfectly justifiable fight and part of democracy."

In June 2013, the Supreme Court ruled that the 1-mile stretch of highway crossing Beit Safafa would cause unacceptable damage to the residents' quality of life. Beit Safafa's lawyers say the construction of an acoustically insulated tunnel that puts the road underground and protects the area's geographic integrity might be an acceptable solution.

According to ARIJ, Israel has expropriated land from Sharafat and Beit Safafa for the construction of three Israeli settlements:

- 1,529 dunams have been taken for Gilo,
- 166 dunams have been taken for Har Homa,
- 285 dunams have been taken for Giv’at Hamatos

== Education ==
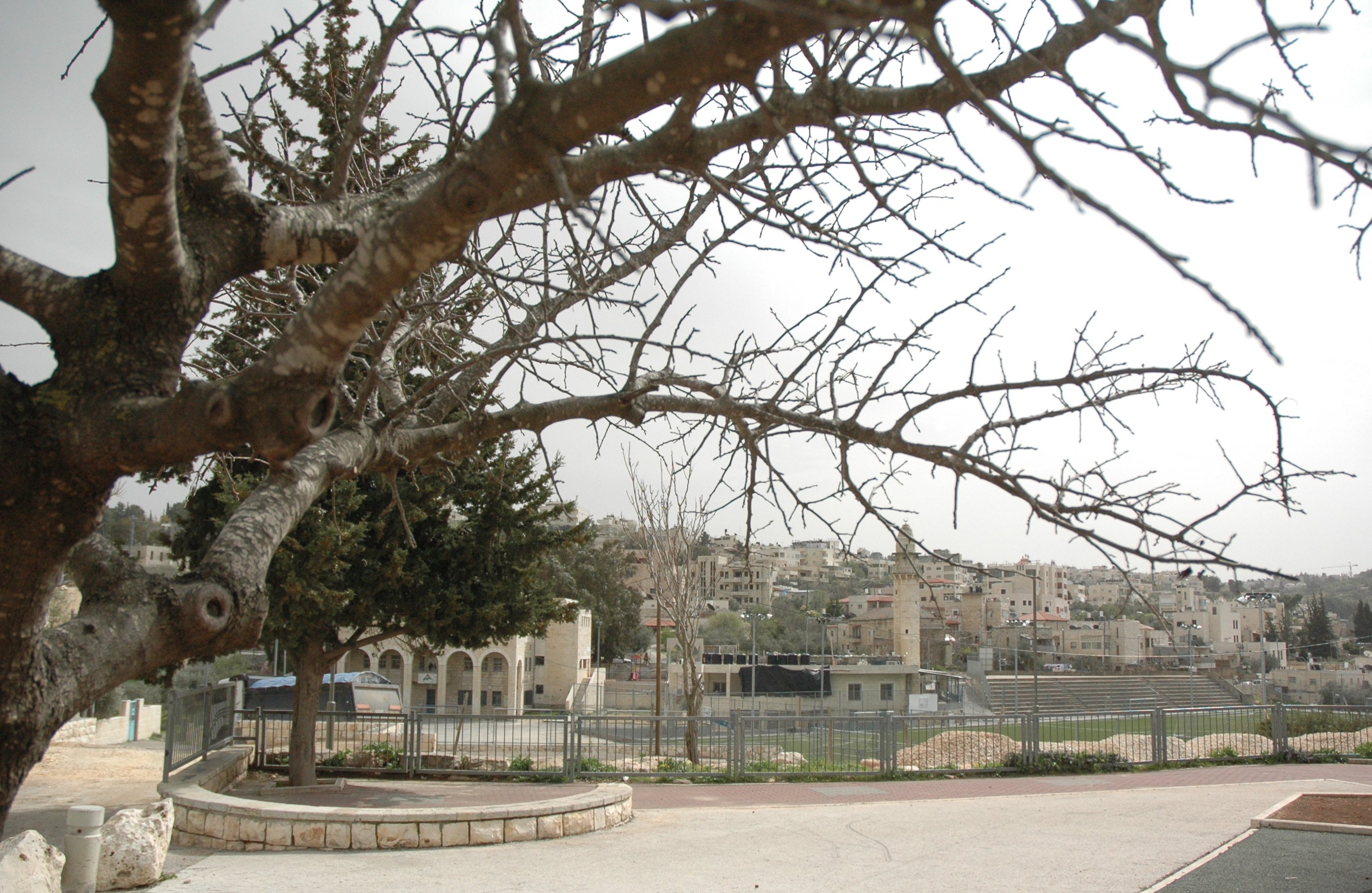
View of Beit Safafa from park

Beit Safafa has three schools: Beit Safafa Elementary School, Beit Safafa High School and al-Salam School, a school for special needs children. Beit Safafa schools follow both the Israeli Bagrut curriculum and the Palestinian Tawjihi curriculum. In 1997, the Hand in Hand School for Bilingual Education was founded in Beit Safafa. The school, supported by the Israeli Ministry of Education and the Jerusalem Municipality, offers a bilingual curriculum in Hebrew and Arabic, with joint classes for Israelis and Palestinians. In 2012, 530 Palestinian and Israeli children were enrolled in the school.

In 2012, Bakehila, an organization founded by Erel Margalit of Jerusalem Venture Partners to aid children from underprivileged neighborhoods, opened an educational enrichment center in Beit Safafa.

== See also ==
- Al-Mashrabiya Building

== Notable people ==
- Sayed Kashua

== Bibliography ==
- Barron, J.B., ed. (1923). Palestine: Report and General Abstracts of the Census of 1922. Government of Palestine.
- Barzel, Vered (2007-12-18), Jerusalem, Beit Safafa (West), Hadashot Arkheologiyot – Excavations and Surveys in Israel
- Burgoyne, Michael Hamilton (1987). Mamluk Jerusalem. ISBN 090503533X.
- Canaan, T. (1927). Mohammedan Saints and Sanctuaries in Palestine. London: Luzac & Co. (p. 30)
- Conder, C.R.; Kitchener, H.H. (1883). The Survey of Western Palestine: Memoirs of the Topography, Orography, Hydrography, and Archaeology. Vol. 3. London: Committee of the Palestine Exploration Fund.
- Eirikh-Rose, Anna; Levi, Danit (2012-12-31), Jerusalem, Beit Safafa, Hadashot Arkheologiyot – Excavations and Surveys in Israel
- Finn, J. (1878). E.A. Finn (ed.). Stirring Times, or, Records from Jerusalem Consular Chronicles of 1853 to 1856. Edited and Compiled by His Widow E. A. Finn. With a Preface by the Viscountess Strangford. Vol. 2. London: C.K. Paul & co. p. 215
- Government of Jordan, Department of Statistics (1964). First Census of Population and Housing. Volume I: Final Tables; General Characteristics of the Population (PDF).
- Government of Palestine, Department of Statistics (1945). Village Statistics, April, 1945.
- Guérin, V. (1869). Description Géographique Historique et Archéologique de la Palestine (in French). Vol. 1: Judee, pt. 2. Paris: L'Imprimerie Nationale.
- Hadawi, S. (1970). Village Statistics of 1945: A Classification of Land and Area ownership in Palestine. Palestine Liberation Organization Research Center.
- Hartmann, M. (1883). "Die Ortschaftenliste des Liwa Jerusalem in dem türkischen Staatskalender für Syrien auf das Jahr 1288 der Flucht (1871)". Zeitschrift des Deutschen Palästina-Vereins. 6: 102–149.
- Hütteroth, W.-D.; Abdulfattah, K. (1977). Historical Geography of Palestine, Transjordan and Southern Syria in the Late 16th Century. Erlanger Geographische Arbeiten, Sonderband 5. Erlangen, Germany: Vorstand der Fränkischen Geographischen Gesellschaft. ISBN 3-920405-41-2.
- Mills, E., ed. (1932). Census of Palestine 1931. Population of Villages, Towns and Administrative Areas. Jerusalem: Government of Palestine.
- Palmer, E.H. (1881). The Survey of Western Palestine: Arabic and English Name Lists Collected During the Survey by Lieutenants Conder and Kitchener, R. E. Transliterated and Explained by E.H. Palmer. Committee of the Palestine Exploration Fund.
- Pringle, D. (1997). Secular buildings in the Crusader Kingdom of Jerusalem: an archaeological Gazetter. Cambridge University Press. ISBN 9780521460101.
- Robinson, E.; Smith, E. (1841). Biblical Researches in Palestine, Mount Sinai and Arabia Petraea: A Journal of Travels in the year 1838. Vol. 2. Boston: Crocker & Brewster.
- Robinson, E.; Smith, E. (1841). Biblical Researches in Palestine, Mount Sinai and Arabia Petraea: A Journal of Travels in the year 1838. Vol. 3. Boston: Crocker & Brewster.
- Röhricht, R. (1893). (RRH) Regesta regni Hierosolymitani (MXCVII-MCCXCI) (in Latin). Berlin: Libraria Academica Wageriana.
- Schick, C. (1896). "Zur Einwohnerzahl des Bezirks Jerusalem". Zeitschrift des Deutschen Palästina-Vereins. 19: 120–127.
- Socin, A. (1879). "Alphabetisches Verzeichniss von Ortschaften des Paschalik Jerusalem". Zeitschrift des Deutschen Palästina-Vereins. 2: 135–163.
- Zilberbod, Irina (2007-12-20), Jerusalem, Beit Safafa Final Report, Hadashot Arkheologiyot – Excavations and Surveys in Israel
