= Gilo =

Israeli settlement in East Jerusalem

Coordinates: 31°43′53″N 35°11′11″E

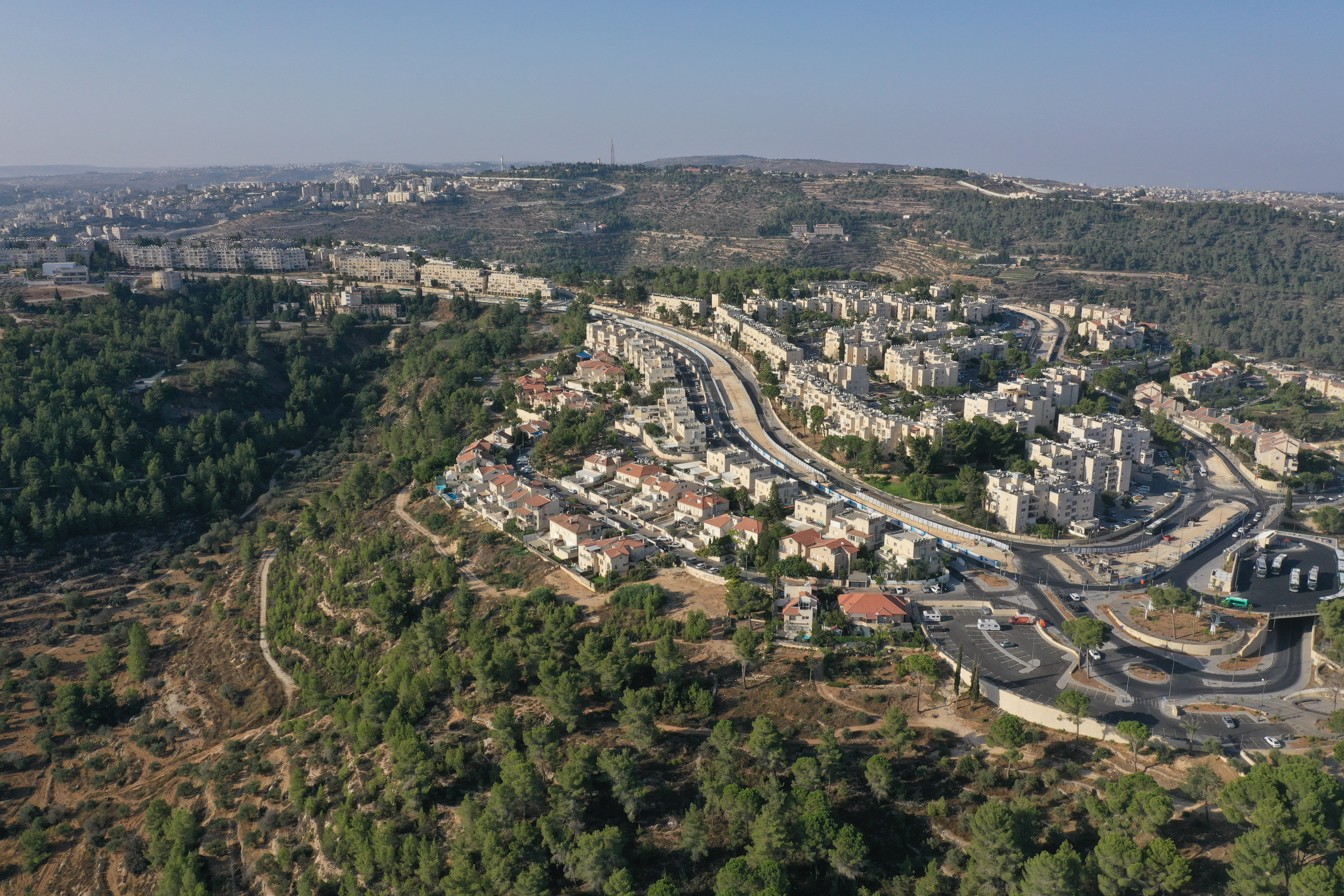
View of Gilo

Gilo (Hebrew: גילה) is an Israeli settlement in south-western East Jerusalem, with a population of 30,000. Although it is located within the Jerusalem Municipality, it is widely considered a settlement, because as one of the five Ring Neighborhoods built by Israel surrounding Jerusalem, it was built on land in the West Bank that was occupied by and effectively annexed to Israel following the 1967 Six-Day War and 1980 Jerusalem Law.

The international community regards Israeli settlements illegal under international law, although Israel disputes this. Israel also disputes its designation as a settlement, and it is administered as part of the Jerusalem municipality.

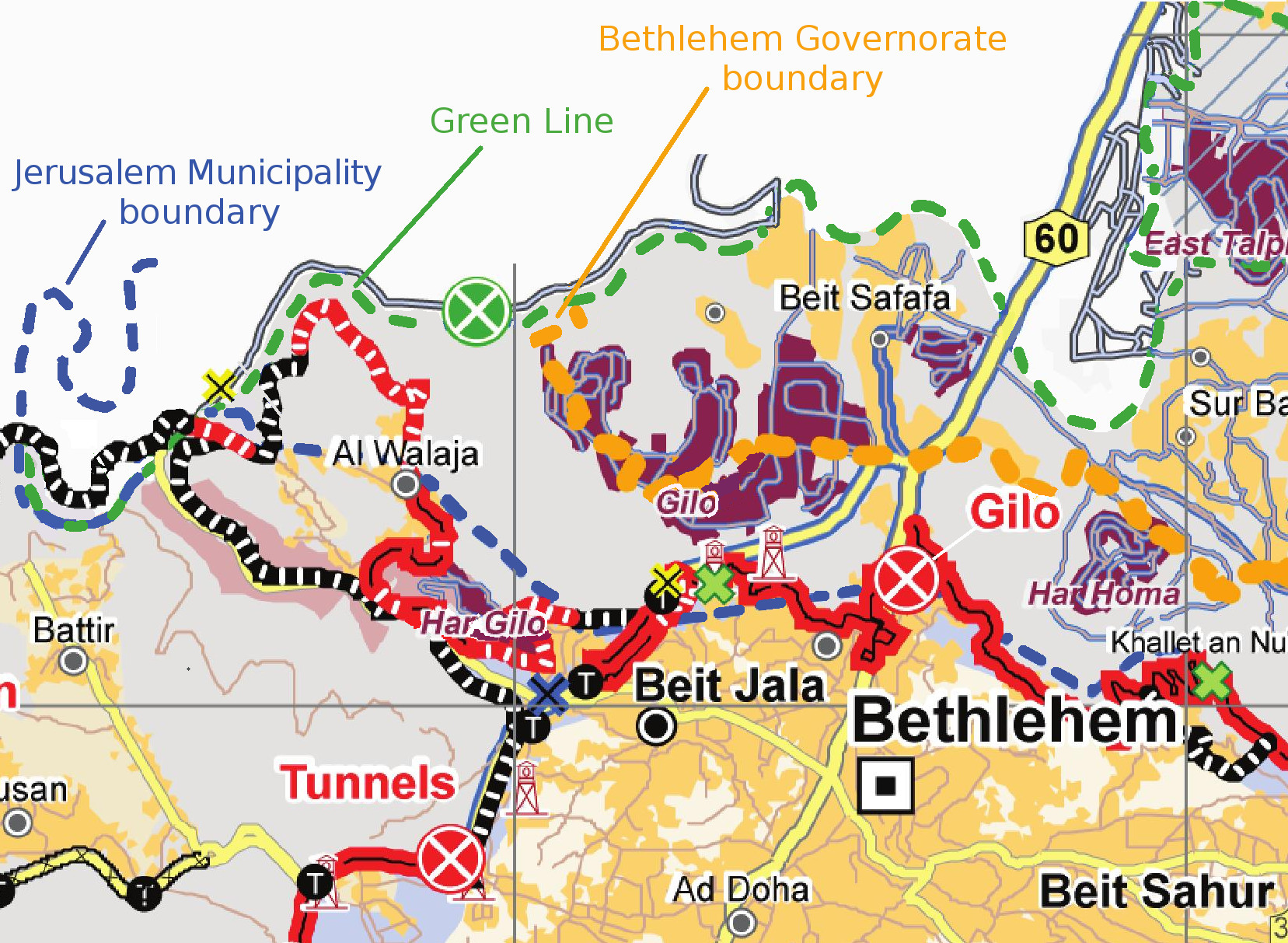
Map of the Gilo region

== Geography ==
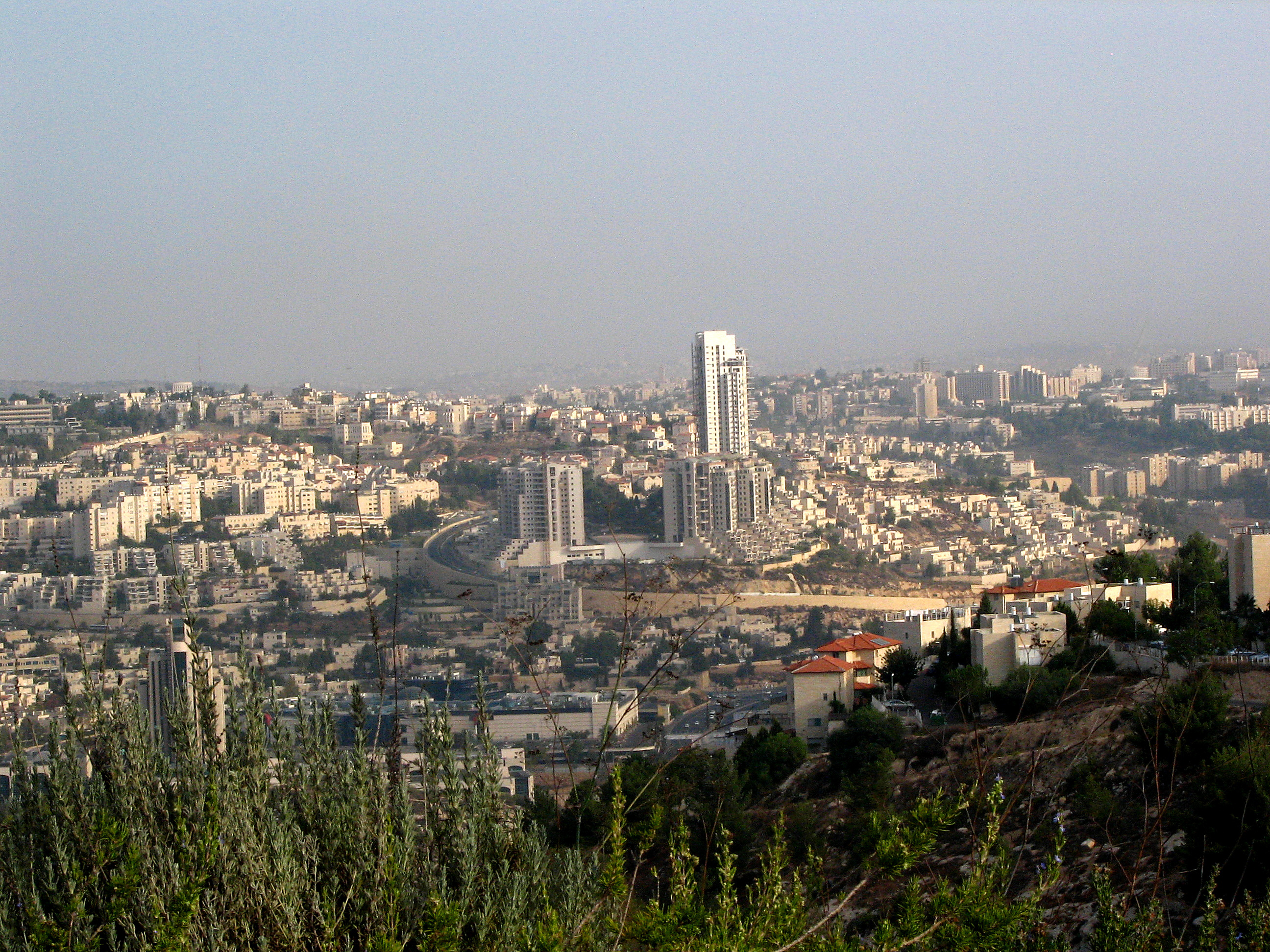
Panoramic view of Jerusalem from Gilo

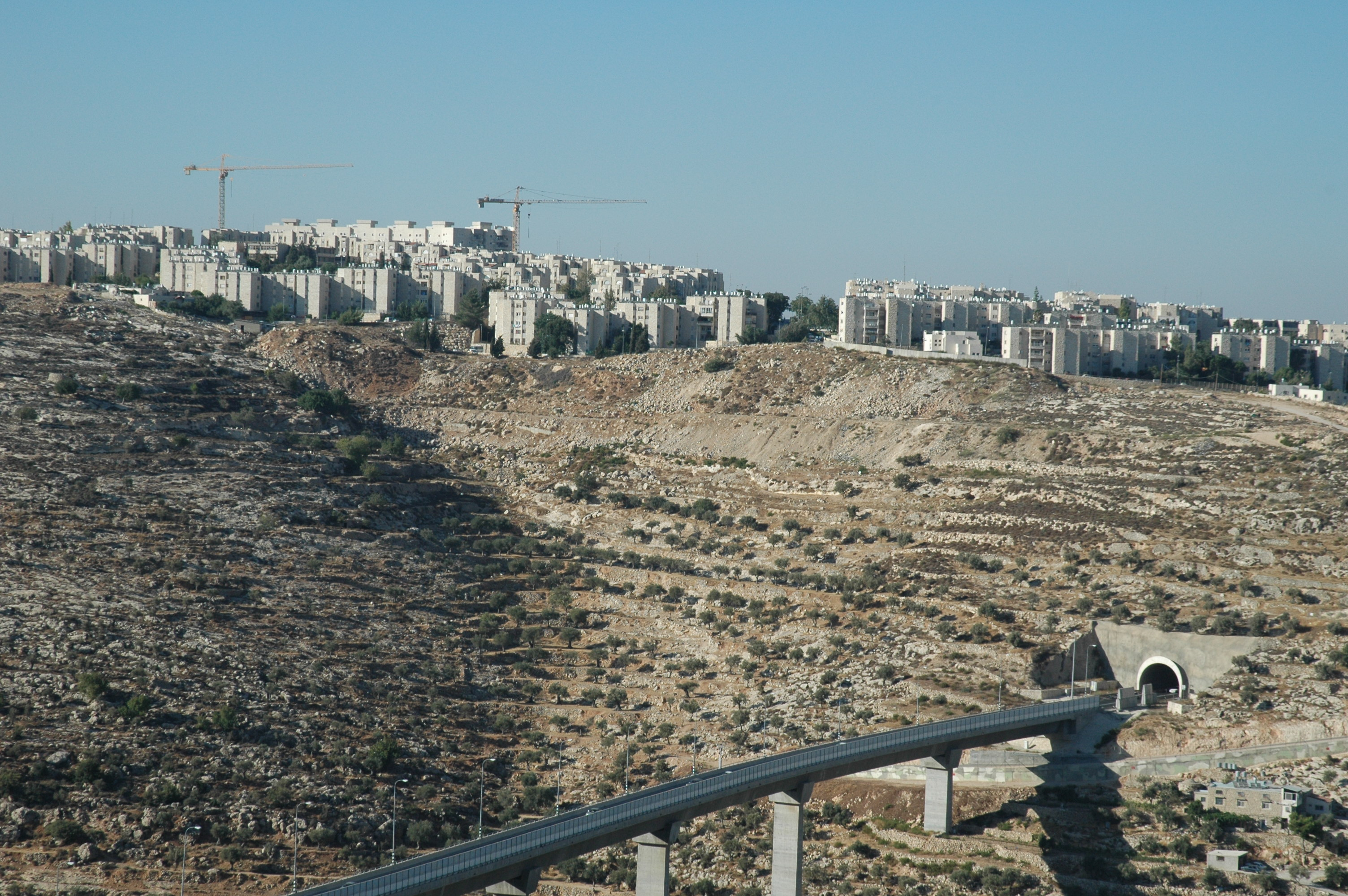
View of Gilo from Beit Jala

Gilo is located on a hilltop in southwestern East Jerusalem separated from Beit Jala by a deep gorge. The Tunnels Highway to Gush Etzion runs underneath it on the east, and the settlement of Har Gilo is visible on the adjacent peak. Beit Safafa and Sharafat are located north of Gilo, while Bethlehem is to the South.

== History ==
=== Biblical era ===
A site dating to the period of Israelite settlement during Iron Age I (1200–1000 BCE) was identified and excavated at the modern site of Gilo. The site revealed a small planned settlement with dwellings along the perimeter of the site, together with pottery dating to the twelfth century BC. The southern part of the Iron Age site at Gilo is believed to be one of the earliest Israelite sites from this period. The site was surrounded by a defensive wall and divided into large yards, possibly sheep pens, with houses at the edges. Buildings at the site are amongst the earliest examples of the pillared four room house characteristic of Iron Age Israelite architecture, featuring a courtyard divided by stone pillars, a rectangular back room and rooms along the courtyard. The foundations of a structure built of large stones were also uncovered, possibly a fortified defense tower.

The biblical town of Giloh is mentioned in the Book of Joshua (Joshua 15:51) and the Book of Samuel (II Sam 15:12). Some scholars believe that biblical Giloh was located in the central Hebron Hills, whereas the name of the modern settlement was chosen because of its proximity to Beit Jala, possibly a corruption of Giloh. During the construction of the modern suburb of Gilo, archaeologists discovered a fortress and agricultural implements from the period of the First Temple period above the shopping center on Rehov Haganenet. Between Givat Canada and Gilo Park, they unearthed the remains of a farm and graves from the Second Temple period. Roman and Byzantine remains have also been found at various sites.

=== Modern era ===
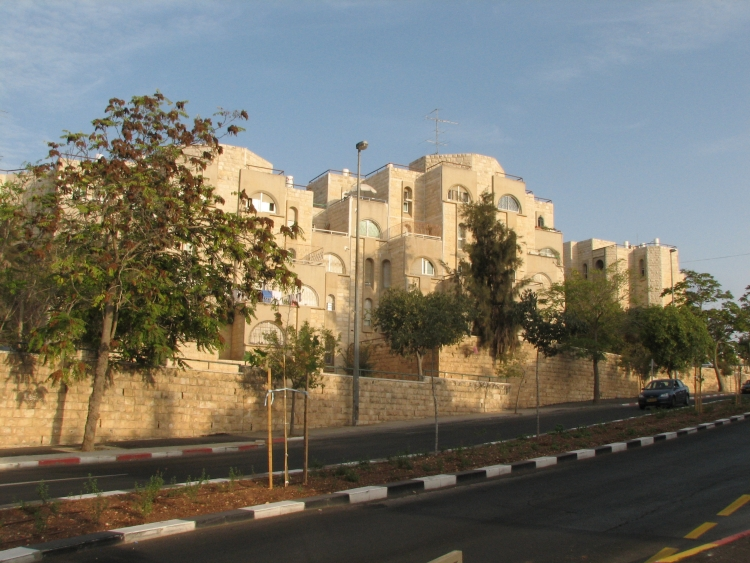
Street in Gilo

According to ARIJ, Israel confiscated land from several Palestinian villages/towns in order to construct Gilo:

- 1,529 dunams from Sharafat and Beit Safafa,
- 594 dunums from Bethlehem,
- 570 dunams from Beit Jala,
- 45 dunams from al-Walaja.

During the 1948 Arab–Israeli War, the Egyptian army positioned its artillery at Gilo, heavily shelling West Jerusalem. An attempt to advance on Jerusalem from Gilo was beaten back in a fierce battle. Kibbutz Ramat Rachel, located just north-east of Gilo, changed hands three times, ultimately remaining part of Israel, but Gilo remained on the side of the Green Line held by the Kingdom of Jordan until 1967.

In 1970, the Israeli government expropriated 12,300 dunams of land to build Ring Neighborhoods around Jerusalem on land conquered in the Six-Day War.

Gilo was established in 1973. According to some sources, the land belonged to the Palestinian villages of Sharafat, Beit Jala and Beit Safafa. With its expansion over the years, Gilo has formed a wedge between Jerusalem and Beit Jala-Bethlehem.

== Demography ==
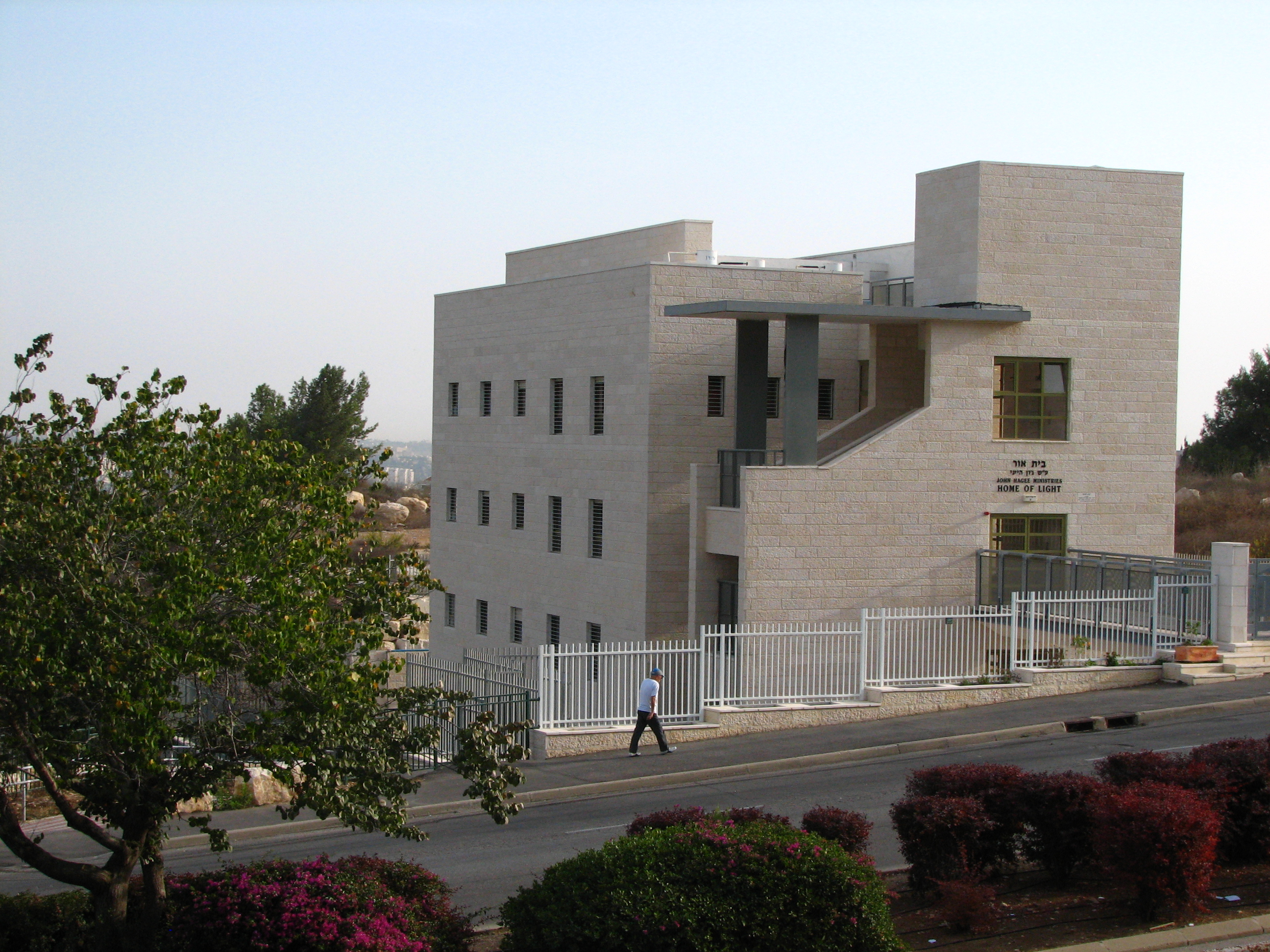
Beit Or hostel

In 2017, Gilo had a population of 30,900. From its inception, Gilo has provided housing to new Jewish immigrants from around the world. Many of those who spent their first months in the country at the immigrant hostel in Gilo, including those from Iran, Syria, France and South America, chose to remain in the neighborhood. Since the large influx of Soviet Jews in the 1990s, Gilo has absorbed 15% of all immigrants of that wave settling in Jerusalem. The immigrant hostel is now the site of an urban kibbutz, Beit Yisrael. Gilo is a mixed community of religious and secular Jews, although more Haredi families are moving in.

== Schools and institutions ==
Beit Or (Home of Light), a hostel for autistic young adults, opened in Gilo in March 2008. The Ilan home for handicapped adults is located in Gilo. Gilo has 35 synagogues. In 2009, the Gilo community center, one of the largest in the country, introduced a new hybrid water heating system that saves energy and greatly reduces pollution. Park Gilo has a large adventure playground for children.

== Settlement debate ==
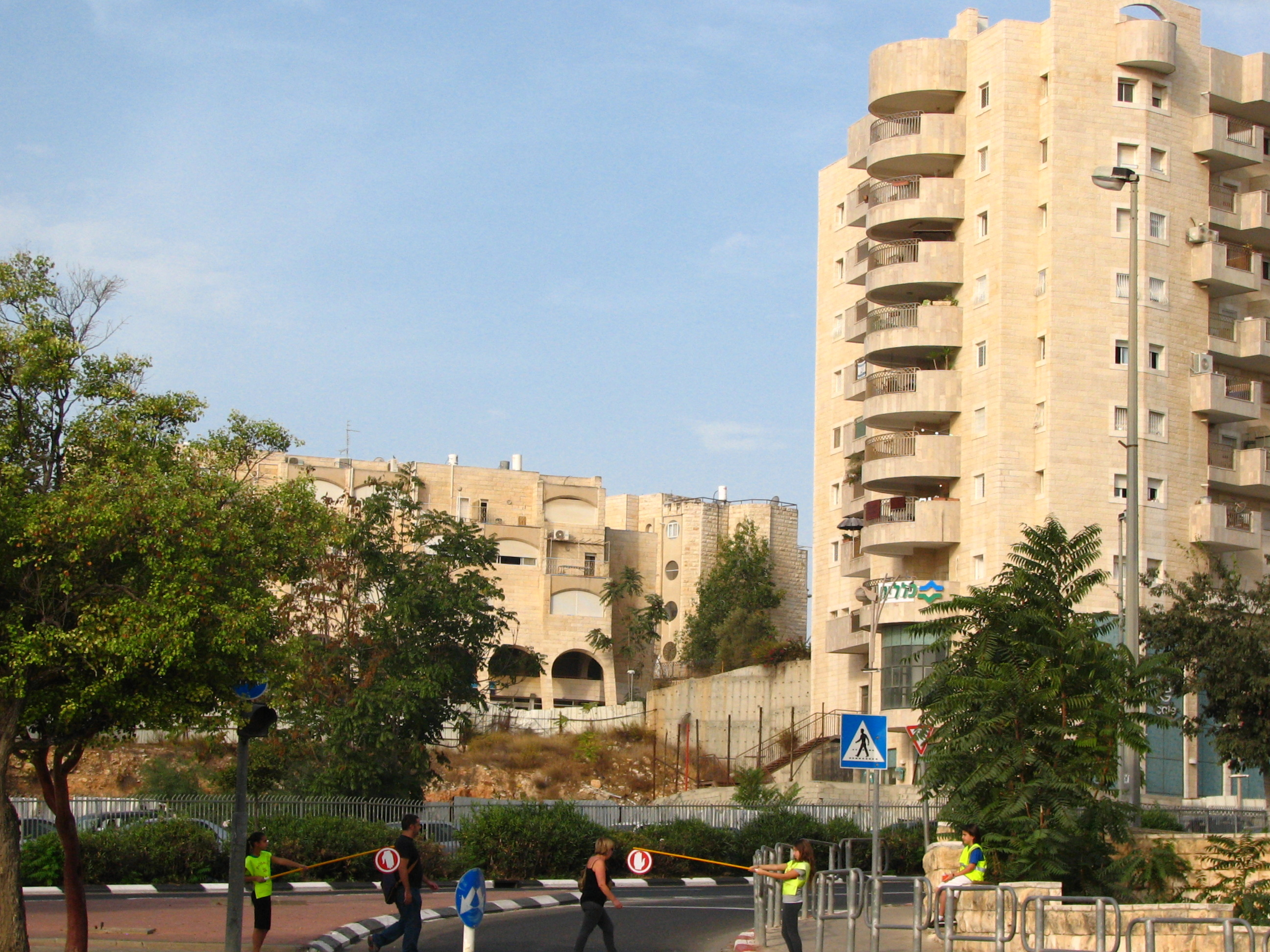
Gilo shopping center and residential towers

Because Gilo is located beyond the 1949 Green Line, on land occupied since the Six-Day War, the United Nations, the European Union and Japan refer to it as an illegal settlement.

Israel disputes this, and considers it a neighborhood of Jerusalem. In an interview with the Jerusalem Post, Gilo community council director Yaffa Shitrit, invited the world "to come and see the neighborhood of Gilo and to understand the geography. We're not a settlement, we're part of the city of Jerusalem, we're a neighborhood like Katamon." Palestinians regard it as occupied territory and make no distinction between Gilo and the West Bank settlements.

Plans to expand Gilo have drawn criticism from the United States and United Kingdom. Israel maintains that it has the right to build freely in Gilo because the neighborhood is within (expanded) Jerusalem municipal borders and not a West Bank settlement. In 2009, the Jerusalem Planning Committee approved construction of 900 new housing units in Gilo, sparking a fresh round of global criticism.

== Arab–Israeli conflict ==
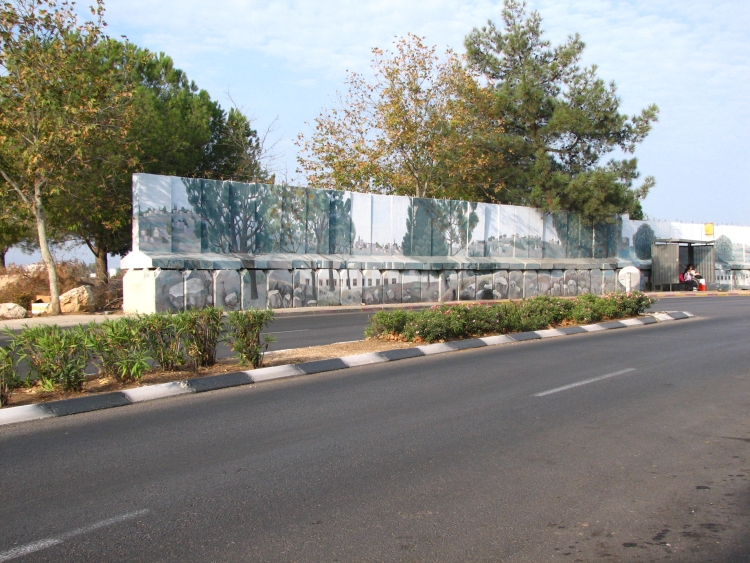
Concrete wall decorated with landscape mural built to shield Gilo residents from Palestinian gunfire (dismantled in 2010)

From 2000, Beit Jala, a predominantly Palestinian Christian town, was used as a base by Fatah's Tanzim gunmen to launch sniper and mortar attacks against Gilo. The Israeli government built a concrete barrier and installed bulletproof windows in the homes and schools on the periphery of Gilo, facing Beit Jala. The attacks on Gilo subsided after Operation Defensive Shield, with the rate slowing to three incidents of gunfire that year. On August 15, 2010, following years of relative quiet, the IDF started dismantling the concrete barrier, nearly a decade after its construction.

Seventeen of the 19 passengers killed in the Patt Junction bus bombing were residents of Gilo.

== Notable residents ==
- Eli Amir (born 1937), writer and civil servant
- Yisrael Friedman (born 1923), rabbi
- Rami Levy (born 1955), founder of Rami Levy Hashikma Marketing

== See also ==
- Positions on Jerusalem
- List of modern names for biblical place names
