= Sharafat, East Jerusalem =

Palestinian neighborhood in East Jerusalem

Coordinates: 31°44′35″N 35°11′39″E

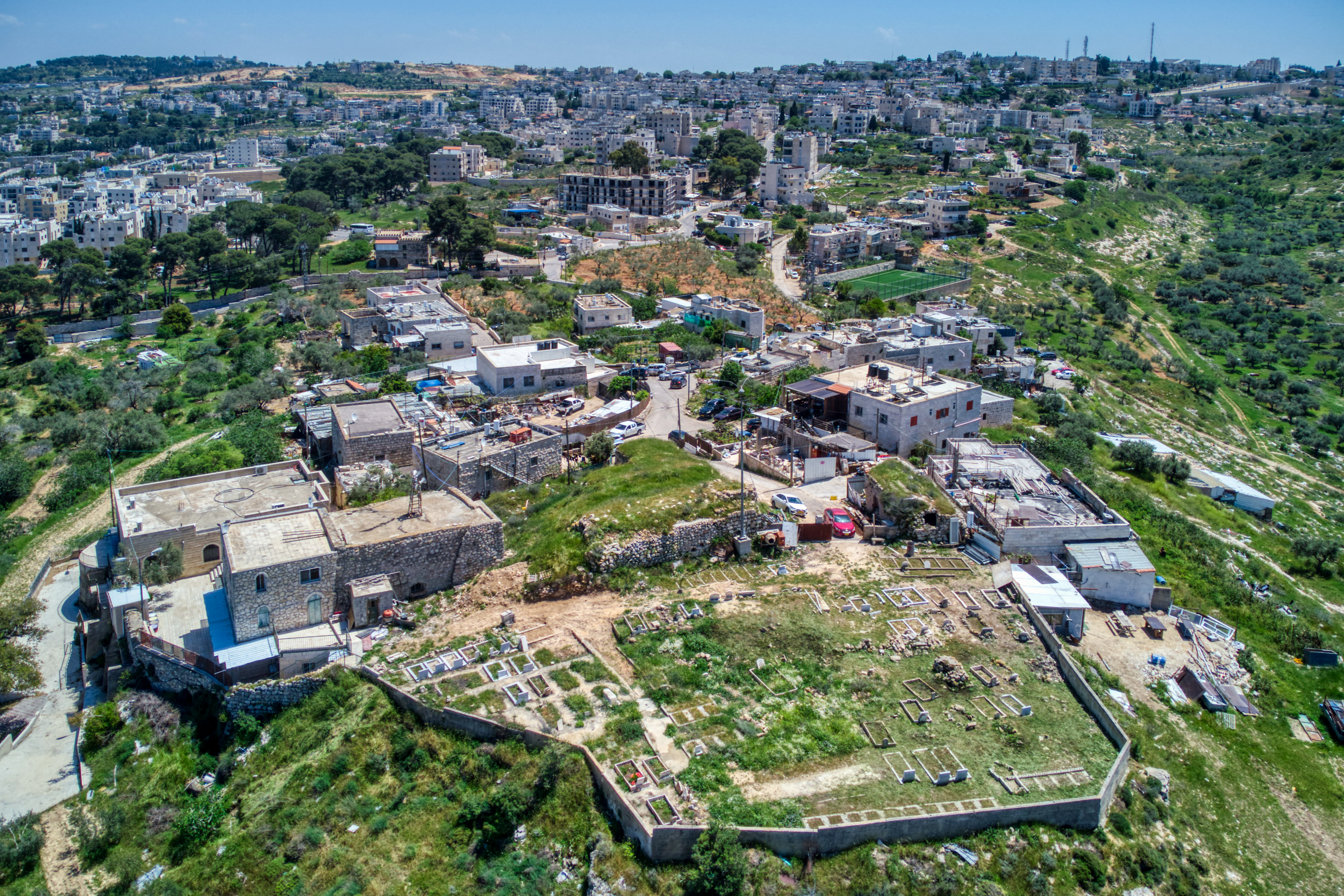
The old part of Sharafat village

Sharafat (Arabic: شرفات) is a Palestinian Arab neighborhood of East Jerusalem, located within approximately 5 km to the south west of the Old City of Jerusalem. It is situated close to the Palestinian town of Beit Safafa and near the Israeli settlement of Gilo in the southern portion of East Jerusalem.

Sharafat is later mentioned in chronicles from the 13th and 15th centuries, Ottoman tax records from the 16th century, and the travel writings and ethnographies of European and American visitors to Palestine in the 19th and 20th centuries. During the period of Mamluk rule (c. 13th - early 16th centuries), Sharafat was home to the Badriyya^{[i]} a renowned family of awliya (Muslim saints) to whom the village was dedicated as a waqf (Islamic trust) by the viceroy of Damascus in the 14th century, and whose family tombs continue to be venerated to this day.

After the 1948 Palestine War, Sharafat lay in the area to the east of the Green Line that was ruled by Jordan until 1967. Following the occupation West Bank, including East Jerusalem by Israel in the 1967 Six-Day War, Israel included it in its expanded Jerusalem District. In the 1970s, the Israeli government expropriated land from the village to build the settlement of Gilo, whose subsequent expansion saw the destruction of homes, vineyards and orchards in Sharafat. The Palestinian Authority (PA), established pursuant to 1993 Oslo Accords, considers Sharafat a part of its Jerusalem Governorate. In 2002, the population was made up of 978 Palestinians.

== Geography ==
Map of Palestinian Arab localities and Israeli settlements east of the Green Line

Sharafat is situated on a mountain-ridge at an altitude of 764 meters (2,507 ft). It is located east of the Green Line, in the Seam Zone. The built-up area of the village lies 400 meters (1,300 ft) south of Gilo, 700 meters (2,300 ft) from Teddy Stadium. Some tracts of village land were expropriated by the Israeli government in 1970 for the construction of Gilo. According to Jordan's Permanent Representative to the United Nations, an additional 1,350 dunams (1.35 km2) were expropriated in 1983.

In 1996, the total land area of the village was 1,974 dunams (1.974 km2), with a built-up area of 285 dunams. Of these, 1,962 dunams were privately owned by Muslims, and the remainder was public land. Zuhur and Deir Cremisan are often included in land and population surveys as part of Sharafat. In 2003, the combined land area was 8,939 dunams, housing a population of 963 in 245 dwellings.

== History ==
=== Hasmonean era ===
The site of a prosperous Jewish village during the Hasmonean period, archaeological excavations performed by the Israel Antiquities Authority in 2019 have found remains of a rural Jewish settlement from the Hasmonean period, dated to between 140 BC and 37 BC. The excavations by the Israel Antiquities Authority was done prior to the construction of a school in the Sharafat neighborhood in southern Jerusalem.

In the excavation findings in the site, there was a large wine-making winepress that contained numerous fragments of jars, a large columbarium cave, an olive oil press, a large Mikveh (bath used for the purpose of ritual immersion in Judaism). The highlight of the excavation is a magnificent burial estate, which included a corridor that led to a large rock-cut courtyard surrounded by a bench. As was customary in Jewish burial caves during the Second Temple period. The stone items are very rare and were usually incorporated into the magnificent buildings and burial estates of Jerusalem, such as that of the priestly family of the sons of Hazeer in Kidron and several tombs in the Sanhedria neighborhood of Jerusalem.

=== Mamluk era ===
During the period of Mamluk rule (c. 13th - early 16th centuries), Sharafat was home to the Badriyya^{[i]} a renowned family of awliya (Muslim saints) to whom the village was dedicated as a waqf (Islamic trust) by the viceroy of Damascus in the 14th century, and whose family tombs continue to be venerated to this day. Sharafat is mentioned in Jerusalem chronicles from the 13th and 15th centuries, Ottoman tax records from the 16th century, and the travel writings and ethnographies of European and American visitors to Palestine in the 19th and 20th centuries. Jerusalem chronicles from the 13th century mention the Husseini family renting the lands of Sharafat. The specific branch who leased the village from a fief-holder is said to be al-Husyani al-Wafā'i, descendants of al-Husayn ibn Ali, grandson of the founder of Islam, Muhammad, and the village remained in their possession throughout the Mamluk period.

The Jerusalemite chronicler Mujīr al-Dīn's al-Uns al-Jalīl (c. 1495) documents the exploits of Sufi notables in Hebron and Jerusalem, and provides much information about the history of Sharafat in the Mamluk period. The Abdu l-Wafā' or the Wafā'iyya are described by him as a family of Sufi scholars and ashrāf ("honoured ones") whose origins were in 12th-century Iraq. Al-Sayyid Badr al-Dīn Muhammed (d. 1253, also known as Sheikh Badir), a renowned Sufi wāli (Muslim saint) from this family took up residence in Dayr al-Shaykh. 'Abd al-Ḥafiz (d. 1296–1297), his grandson, established roots in neighbouring Sharafat when Dayr al-Shaykh had become too small to accommodate the growing population, relinquishing the revenues to the land he owned in the latter for the benefit of those remaining. Dāwūd, the son of al-Ḥafiz, established a zāwiya and tomb in Sharafat where all his descendants were buried. The most famous of these were al-Sayyid 'Alī and al-Sayyid Muhammed al-Bahā', considered "pillars" of the Holy Land and its surroundings (wa-kānā a'mida al-arḍ al-muaqaddasa wa-mā hawlahā). Mujīr al-Dīn notes that the arrival of Sufis led to the departure of the Christian community, highlighting the institution's role in accelerating Islamization.

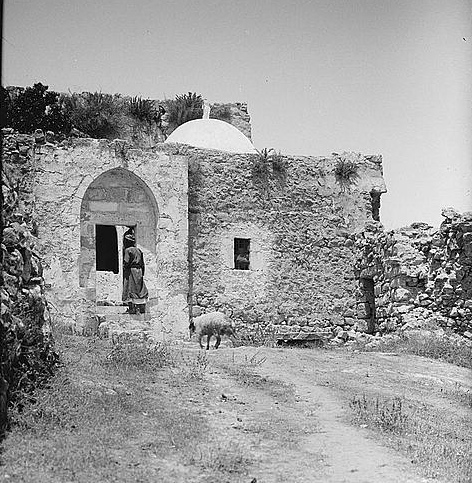
The Weli of Budrieh at Sherafat, between 1900 and 1926.

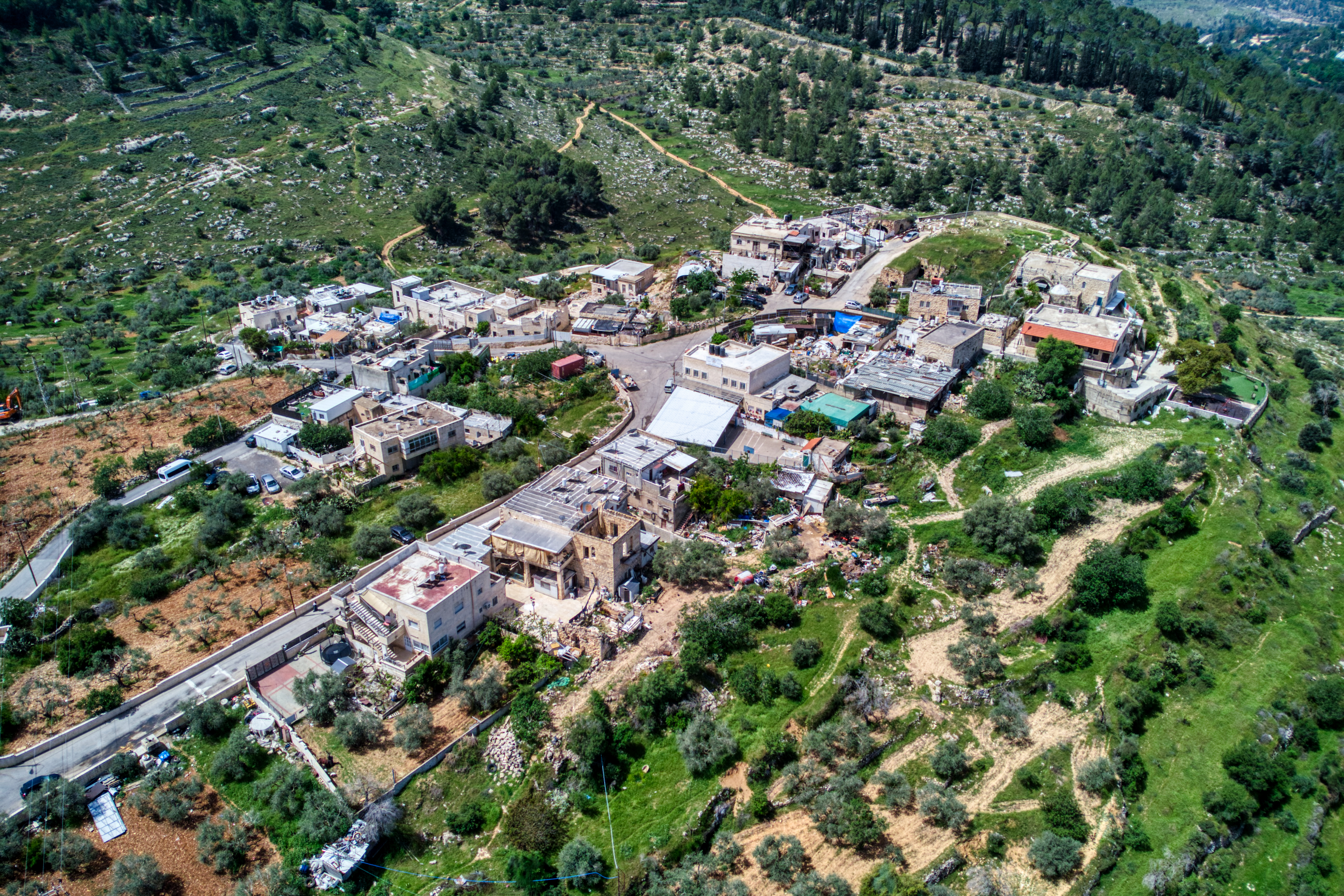
The Weli of Budrieh in the old part of Sherafat, 2023.

Under Mamluk rule, the village of Sharafat was dedicated as a waqf ("Islamic trust") to the Badriyya family by the viceroy of Damascus in 1349. Al-Dīn's al-Uns al-Jalīl suggests that Sharafat was named for this family of ashrāf. The Palestine Exploration Fund notes that prior to its renaming, the village was known as Karafat (the opposite of Sharafat, which means "noble"). Badriyya (also called Sitt Badriyya), Sheikh Badir's daughter, was also buried in Sharafat, as was her husband, Ahmed et-Tubbar. The simple, unadorned tomb of Sitt Badriyya overlooks a valley that is today crowded with highways, but is still venerated by area residents, who believe that she can render assistance in times of drought.

=== Ottoman era ===
Sharafat is listed in the Daftar-i Mufassal, a book of the Ottoman Empire that recorded tax related information for the villages in the area in 1596–1597. It had a population of 12 Muslim families. A 16th-century Ottoman map situates Sharafat in the green belt around Jerusalem. In 1838 it was described as a Muslim village, located in the Beni Hasan district, west of Jerusalem.

James Finn, the British consul to Jerusalem during Ottoman rule, writes of visiting Sharafat between 1853 and 1856. He describes it as a small village perched on high hill to the southwest of Jerusalem which could be seen from there. The villagers are described as "a robust and well-fed people," who expressed to him that they were happily exempt from a family feud between the Abu Ghosh and Mohammed 'Atallah that was the disturbing the peace of nearby Beit Safafa. An Ottoman village list of about 1870 counted 18 houses and a population of 53, though the population count included only men.

In 1883 the PEF's Survey of Western Palestine (SWP) described Sherafat as a village of moderate size on a low hill. The houses were of stone, and the water-supply was from Ain Yalo, in the valley to the west.

In her book, Bertha Spafford Vester, an American who lived in Jerusalem's American Colony in 1881 and 1949, writes about the grave of a female saint in the village who was venerated by Muslims and Christians alike.

In 1896 the population of Scharafat was estimated to be about 125 persons.

=== British Mandate era ===
In the 1922 census of Palestine conducted by the British Mandate authorities, Sharafat had a population of 106, all Muslims. In 1929, the American Colony established a child welfare station in Sharafat, in a room provided by the village sheikh which was also open to women from the neighbouring villages. In interviews with area residents conducted between 1925 and 1931 by Hilma Natalia Granqvist, the Finnish ethnographer, when asked which villages were renowned for having more daughters than sons, Sharafat was named along with the villages of Beit Sahour and Ein Karem.

In the 1931 census, the population of the village was recorded as 158 Muslims, in 32 houses.

In the 1945 statistics the population of Sharafat was 210 Muslims, with 1,974 dunams of land according to an official land and population survey. 482 dunams were for plantations and irrigable land, 508 for cereals, while 5 dunams were built-up (urban) land.

=== Jordanian era ===
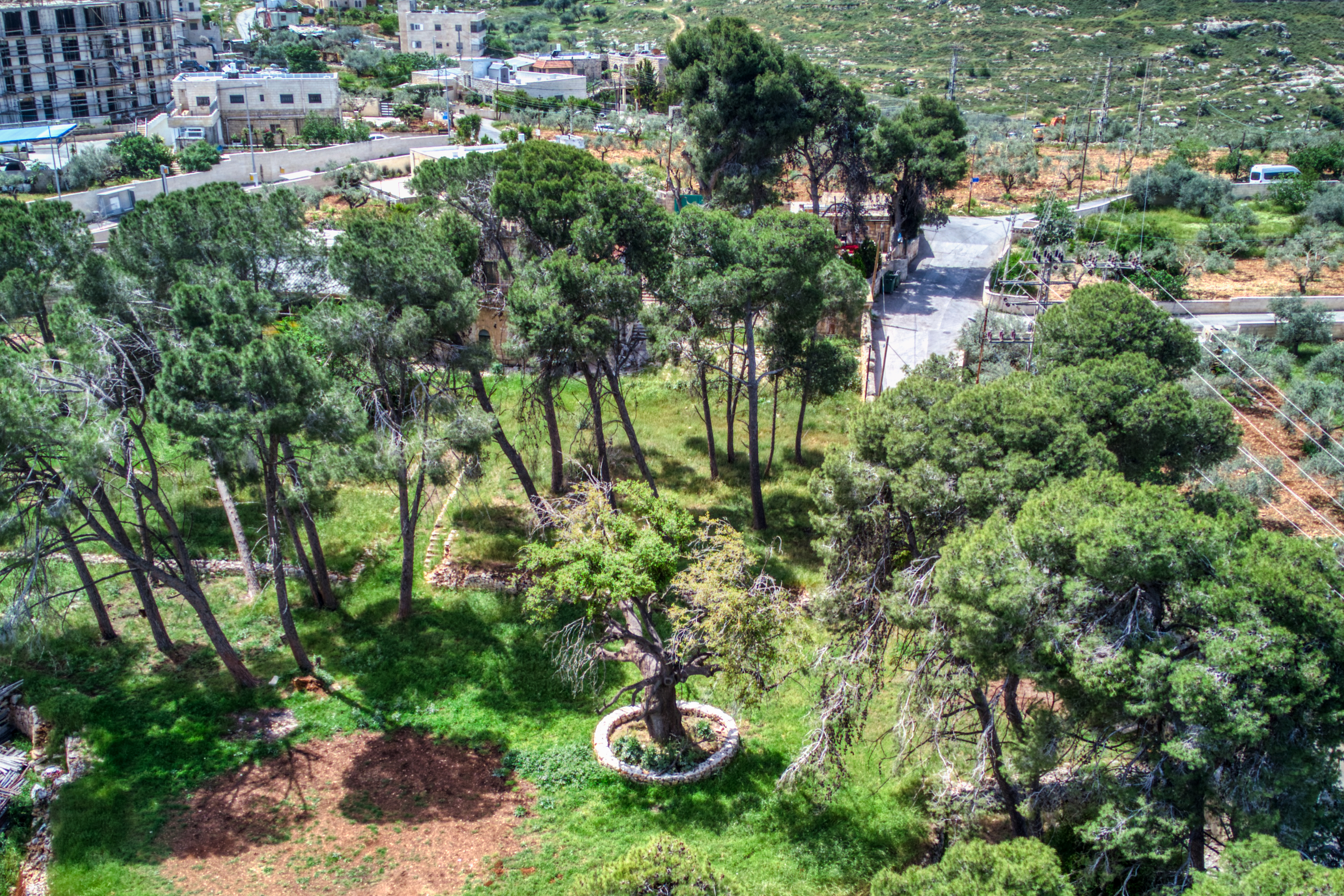
The old oak tree in Alami's land in Sharafat, 2023

After the 1948 Arab-Israeli War, Sharafat lay in the area to the east of the Green Line that was occupied by Jordan until 1967. Musa Alami a Palestinian nationalist and politician, owned a house in Sharafat where he hosted members of the foreign press and British visitors. Serene Husseini Shahid mentions Sharafat in her book A Jerusalem Childhood: The Early Life of Serene Husseini. Her grandfather, Fadi al-Alami, Jerusalem's mayor under Ottoman rule, is said to have bought land in Sharafat after falling in love with an oak tree in the village that was thought to be 1,500 years old. Shahid writes that the mukhtar's home was surrounded by Israeli forces during a raid across the armistice line in 1951. The house was blown up, and Miriam and her daughter were partially buried in the rubble for a day before being rescued. They both succumbed to their wounds in the hospital.

==== 1951 Israeli raid ====
On the night of February 6–7, 1951, the Israel Defense Forces carried out a raid on Sharafat on the orders of Israeli prime minister David Ben-Gurion after IDF intelligence determined that it had served as a base for an attack in which an Israeli man was murdered, his wife raped, and their home robbed. IDF troops from the 16th (Jerusalem) Brigade entered Sharafat at night, surrounding and blowing up two houses, one of which belonged to the village mukhtar. Three women and five children (aged 1–13) were killed, and five women and three children were injured. Moshe Dayan, characterized the operation as "an eye for an eye." Reuven Shiloah, head of the Mossad, told the British ambassador that the incident had been provoked by "Arab raiding, raping, etc. from [the] Jordan side." He also told King Hussein that individual soldiers may have been involved in the raid. Samir Rifa'i, the Prime Minister of Jordan, who had been regarded by Israel as "generally reasonable and conciliatory," described the IDF raid on Sharafat as "fiendish" and "provocative", and became convinced that Israel "did not seriously desire peace," thereby derailing American hopes for pursuing peace talks. According to Benny Morris, such punitive raids constituted a prime IDF strategy between 1951 and 1953.

In 1961, the population of Sharafat was 128.

== After 1967 ==
Following the 1967 war, Sharafat came under Israeli occupation, and it came to form part of Israel's expanded Jerusalem municipality in the Jerusalem District. Government expropriations of land east of the Green Line in the green belt around Jerusalem in 1970 enabled the creation of Jewish satellite neighbourhoods, among them Gilo, which was constructed in 1973 on land belonging to Palestinian residents of Sharafat, Beit Jala, and Beit Safafa.

The impact of the land confiscations in Sharafat is discussed by the permanent observer of the Palestine Liberation Organization to the United Nations in a letter dated November 6, 1986. The case of Halimeh Abdal Nabi, a 70-year-old woman, whose home was demolished in 1986, is outlined therein in detail: In the early 1970s, 40 dunams of land were confiscated from the Abdal Nabi family in order to build roads for the new settlement of Gilo. The kitchen and well of the woman's house were destroyed around this time, and to accommodate Gilo's expansion in 1976, Palestinian vineyards and orchards were also destroyed and homes demolished. A wall built by the Israeli construction company, to separate Abdal Nabi's home from the settlement, blocked her access to her own staircase. Following the demolition of her home in 1986, she went to live in her neighbour's house. Though she wanted to set up a tent on her land, which The Red Cross was willing to provide, she was unable to do so after it was discovered that her land had been declared a "military zone" in 1975.

Ray Hanania, a Palestinian-American journalist, notes that documents attesting to his grandmother's nephew's land ownership rights in Sharafat are at the Ministry of Interior in Jerusalem, but that he has been unable to procure them despite paying them more than two dozen visits since the lands were confiscated in 1970. Hanania describes the land of Sharafat as, "a rambling field of olive trees and small orange groves," noting that to Palestinians, "the land is everything."

On January 24, 2020, Israeli settlers burned the village mosque, writing racist slogans against Arabs and Muslims on its walls. They protested against the evacuation of the Kumi Ori outpost near the Yitzhar settlement in the northern West Bank.

== Development projects ==
In 2010, the Latin Patriarchate launched a construction project to house dozens of Christian families, mostly young couples with children. Some 9,000 square meters of land were purchased by the families and the Jerusalem municipality granted the necessary construction permits. Eighty apartments are now under construction.

== Archaeology ==
Archaeological excavations in 2007 found a terrace compound that may have been part of the agricultural periphery of Sharafat or Beit Safafa in the last century. A quarry and winepress were ascribed to the period of Roman–Byzantine occupation. Ceramic artifacts and a Hasmonean coin date from the Hellenistic and Roman periods. A ritual bath (mikve) was documented near the site.

== Bibliography ==
- Agha, Nuha (2009-05-25). "Jerusalem, Sharafat Final Report" (121). Hadashot Arkheologiyot – Excavations and Surveys in Israel.
- Barron, J.B., ed. (1923). Palestine: Report and General Abstracts of the Census of 1922. Government of Palestine.
- Benveniśtî, M. (2000). Sacred landscape: the buried history of the Holy Land since 1948 (Illustrated ed.). University of California Press. ISBN 9780520234222.
- Cohen, Shaul Ephraim (1993). The politics of planting: Israeli-Palestinian competition for control of land in the Jerusalem periphery (Illustrated ed.). University of Chicago Press. ISBN 9780226112763.
- Conder, C.R.; Kitchener, H.H. (1883). The Survey of Western Palestine: Memoirs of the Topography, Orography, Hydrography, and Archaeology. Vol. 3. London: Committee of the Palestine Exploration Fund.
- Ephrat, Daphna (2008). Spiritual wayfarers, leaders in piety: Sufis and the dissemination of Islam in medieval Palestine (Illustrated ed.). Harvard CMES. ISBN 9780674032019.
- Government of Jordan, Department of Statistics (1964). First Census of Population and Housing. Volume I: Final Tables; General Characteristics of the Population (PDF).
- Government of Palestine, Department of Statistics (1945). Village Statistics, April, 1945.
- Finn, J. (1878). E.A. Finn (ed.). Stirring Times, or, Records from Jerusalem Consular Chronicles of 1853 to 1856. Edited and Compiled by His Widow E.A. Finn. With a Preface by the Viscountess Strangford. Vol. 2. London: C.K. Paul & co.
- Granqvist, H.N. (1950). Child problems among the Arabs: studies in a Muhammadan village in Palestine. Södorström.
- Greenberg, Ela (2010). Preparing the Mothers of Tomorrow: Education and Islam in Mandate Palestine (Illustrated ed.). University of Texas Press. ISBN 9780292721197.
- Hadawi, S. (1970). Village Statistics of 1945: A Classification of Land and Area ownership in Palestine. Palestine Liberation Organization Research Center.
- Hanania, R. (1996). I'm glad I look like a terrorist: growing up Arab in America (Illustrated ed.). Lulu.com. ISBN 9780965476102.
- Hartmann, M. (1883). "Die Ortschaftenliste des Liwa Jerusalem in dem türkischen Staatskalender für Syrien auf das Jahr 1288 der Flucht (1871)". Zeitschrift des Deutschen Palästina-Vereins. 6: 102–149.
- Hütteroth, W.-D.; Abdulfattah, K. (1977). Historical Geography of Palestine, Transjordan and Southern Syria in the Late 16th Century. Erlanger Geographische Arbeiten, Sonderband 5. Erlangen, Germany: Vorstand der Fränkischen Geographischen Gesellschaft. ISBN 3-920405-41-2.
- Kark, R.; Oren-Nordheim, Michal (2001). Jerusalem and its environs: quarters, neighborhoods, villages, 1800–1948 (Illustrated ed.). Wayne State University Press. ISBN 9780814329092.
- Moudjir ed-dyn (1876). Sauvaire (ed.). Histoire de Jérusalem et d'Hébron depuis Abraham jusqu'à la fin du XVe siècle de J.-C. : fragments de la Chronique de Moudjir-ed-dyn.
- Luṭfī, H. (1985). Al Quds al-Mamlûkiyya: a history of Mamlûk Jerusalem based on the Ḥaram documents. K. Schwarz. ISBN 9783922968498.
- Ma'oz, Moshe; Nusseibeh, S. (2000). Moshe Maʻoz (ed.). Jerusalem: points of friction, and beyond (Illustrated ed.). Brill. ISBN 9789041188434.
- Mills, E., ed. (1932). Census of Palestine 1931. Population of Villages, Towns and Administrative Areas. Jerusalem: Government of Palestine.
- Morris, B. (1997). Israel's border wars, 1949–1956: Arab infiltration, Israeli retaliation, and the countdown to the Suez War (2nd, revised, illustrated ed.). Oxford University Press. ISBN 9780198292623.
- Nashāshībī, Nāṣir al-Dīn (1990). Jerusalem's other voice: Ragheb Nashashibi and moderation in Palestinian politics, 1920–1948 (Illustrated ed.). Ithaca Press. ISBN 9780863721175.
- Quarterly Statement - Palestine Exploration Fund. Palestine Exploration Fund. 1916.
- Palmer, E.H. (1881). The Survey of Western Palestine: Arabic and English Name Lists Collected During the Survey by Lieutenants Conder and Kitchener, R. E. Transliterated and Explained by E.H. Palmer. Committee of the Palestine Exploration Fund.
- Pappé, I.; Maʻoz, Moshe (1997). I. Pappé; Moshe Maʻoz (eds.). Middle Eastern politics and ideas: a history from within. I.B.Tauris. ISBN 9781860640124.
- Poliak, Abraham N. (1977). Feudalism in Egypt, Syria, Palestine, and the Lebanon, 1250–1900 (Reprint ed.). Porcupine Press. ISBN 9780879914622.
- Robinson, E.; Smith, E. (1841). Biblical Researches in Palestine, Mount Sinai and Arabia Petraea: A Journal of Travels in the year 1838. Vol. 3. Boston: Crocker & Brewster.
- Schick, C. (1896). "Zur Einwohnerzahl des Bezirks Jerusalem". Zeitschrift des Deutschen Palästina-Vereins. 19: 120–127.
- Socin, A. (1879). "Alphabetisches Verzeichniss von Ortschaften des Paschalik Jerusalem". Zeitschrift des Deutschen Palästina-Vereins. 2: 135–163.
- Universiṭat Tel-Aviv. Makhon le-arkheʾologyah, Makhon le-arkheʼologyah ʻa. sh. Sonyah u-Marḳo Nadler (1998). Tel Aviv, Volume 25. Institute of Archaeology, Tel Aviv University.
- Universität Wien. Orientalisches Institut, Institut für Ägyptologie und Afrikanistik, Institut für Orientalistik (2005). Wiener Zeitschrift für die Kunde des Morgenlandes, Volume 95. Selbstverlag des Orientalischen Instituts, Universität Wien.
- Vester, Bertha Spafford (2007). Our Jersalem. READ BOOKS. ISBN 9781406742879.
