= Straus Street =

Street in Jerusalem, Israel

Coordinates: 31°47′8.7″N 35°13′8.3″E

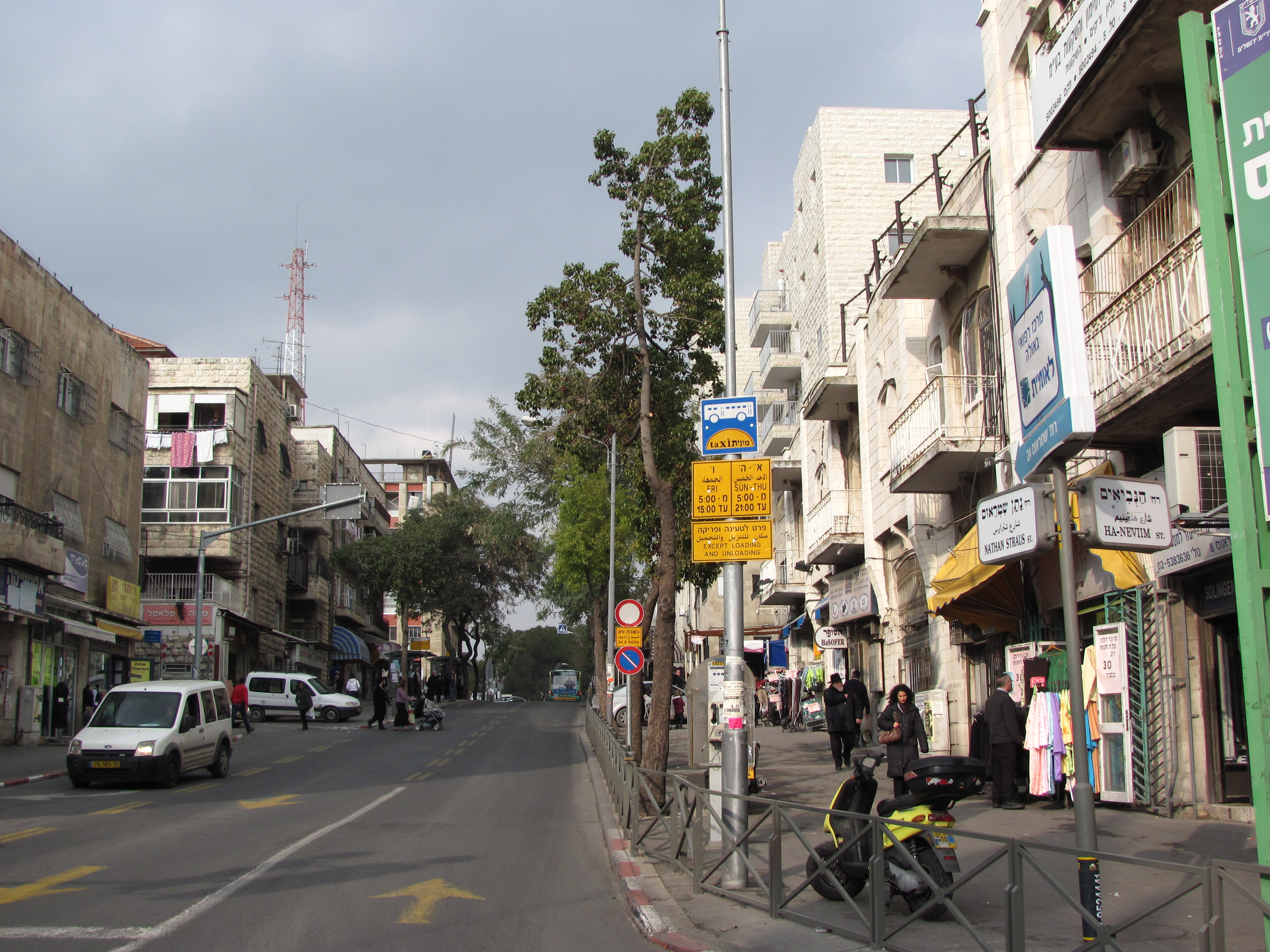
- Looking north on Straus Street from the intersection with Street of the Prophets
- Interactive map of Straus Street
- Native name: רחוב שטראוס; Rehov Straus
- Former name: Chancellor Avenue
- Location: Jerusalem
- North end: Kikar HaShabbat (intersection of Straus Street, Yeshayahu Street, Malkhei Yisrael Street, Yehezkel Street, and Mea Shearim Road); the street continues as Yehezkel Street.
- South end: Jaffa Road; the street continues as King George Street

Construction
- Inauguration: 1930

Straus Street (Hebrew: רחוב שטראוס, Rehov Straus) is a north-south road in north-central Jerusalem. It starts at Jaffa Road and extends to Kikar HaShabbat (Sabbath Square), which marks the intersection of five streets: Straus Street, Yeshayahu Street, Malkhei Yisrael Street, Yehezkel Street, and Mea Shearim Road. The street was named for Nathan Straus, a prominent American merchant and Jewish philanthropist in the early twentieth century.

== Name ==
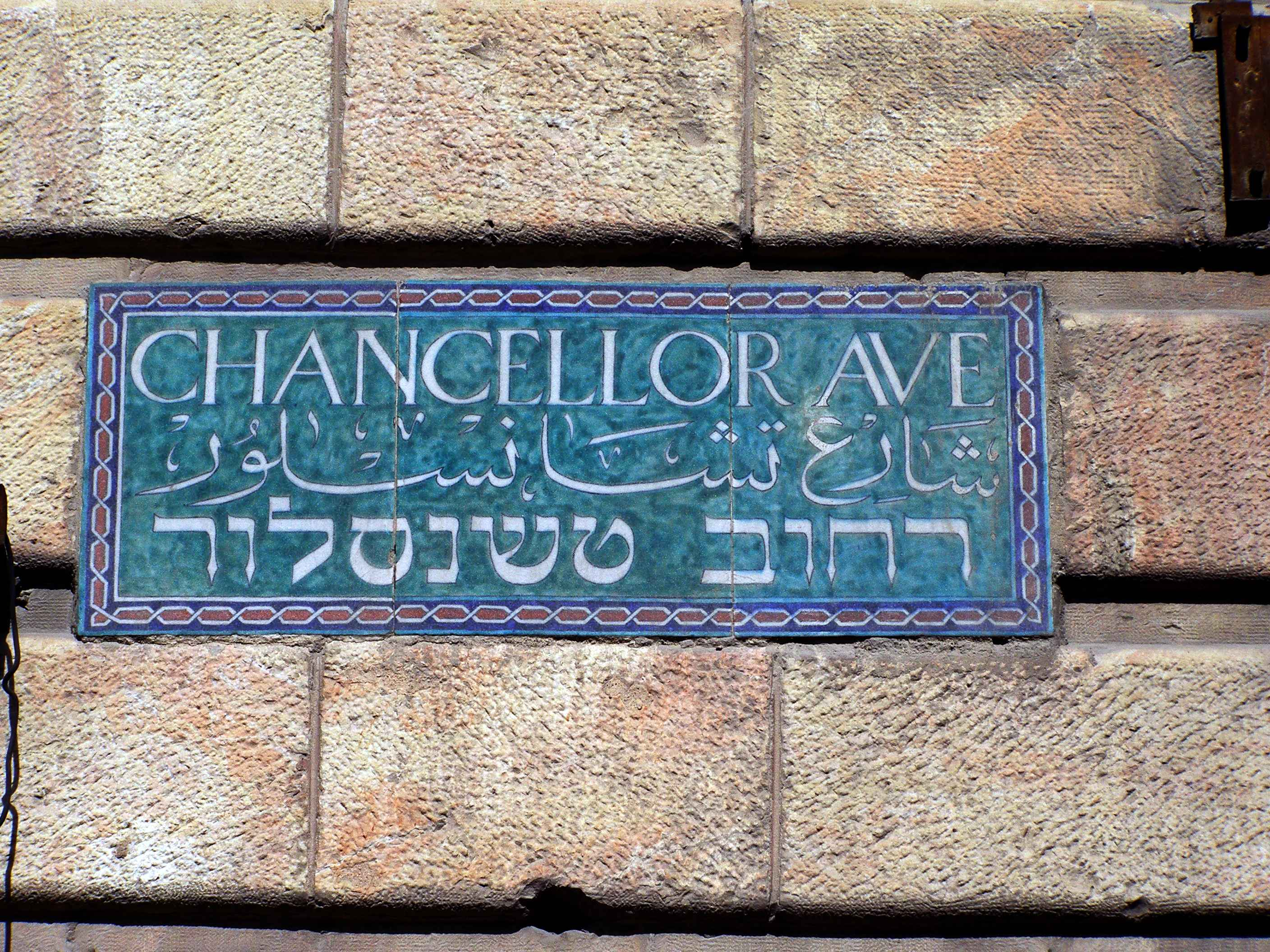
Chancellor Avenue street sign

Inaugurated in 1930, Straus Street was named in honor of Nathan Straus (1848–1931), co-owner of Macy’s department store, New York City Parks Commissioner, and president of the New York City Board of Health, who gifted two-thirds of his personal fortune to projects benefiting Jews and Arabs in Mandatory Palestine. These include the Nathan and Lina Straus Soup Kitchen in the Old City of Jerusalem and the Nathan and Lina Straus Health Centres in Jerusalem and Tel Aviv. The Israeli coastal city of Netanya, founded in 1928, was also named in his honor.

In 1931 the British Mandatory government renamed the street Chancellor Avenue after Sir John Chancellor, a British High Commissioner during the Mandate era. The street reverted to its original name following the 1948 War of Independence.

== History ==
Straus Street is situated along a topographical ridge on the country's watershed line. During the British Mandate for Palestine, the street provided a contiguous route from the Bukharim neighborhood in the north to Rehavia in the south, all Jewish-owned areas.

=== Secular/religious divide ===
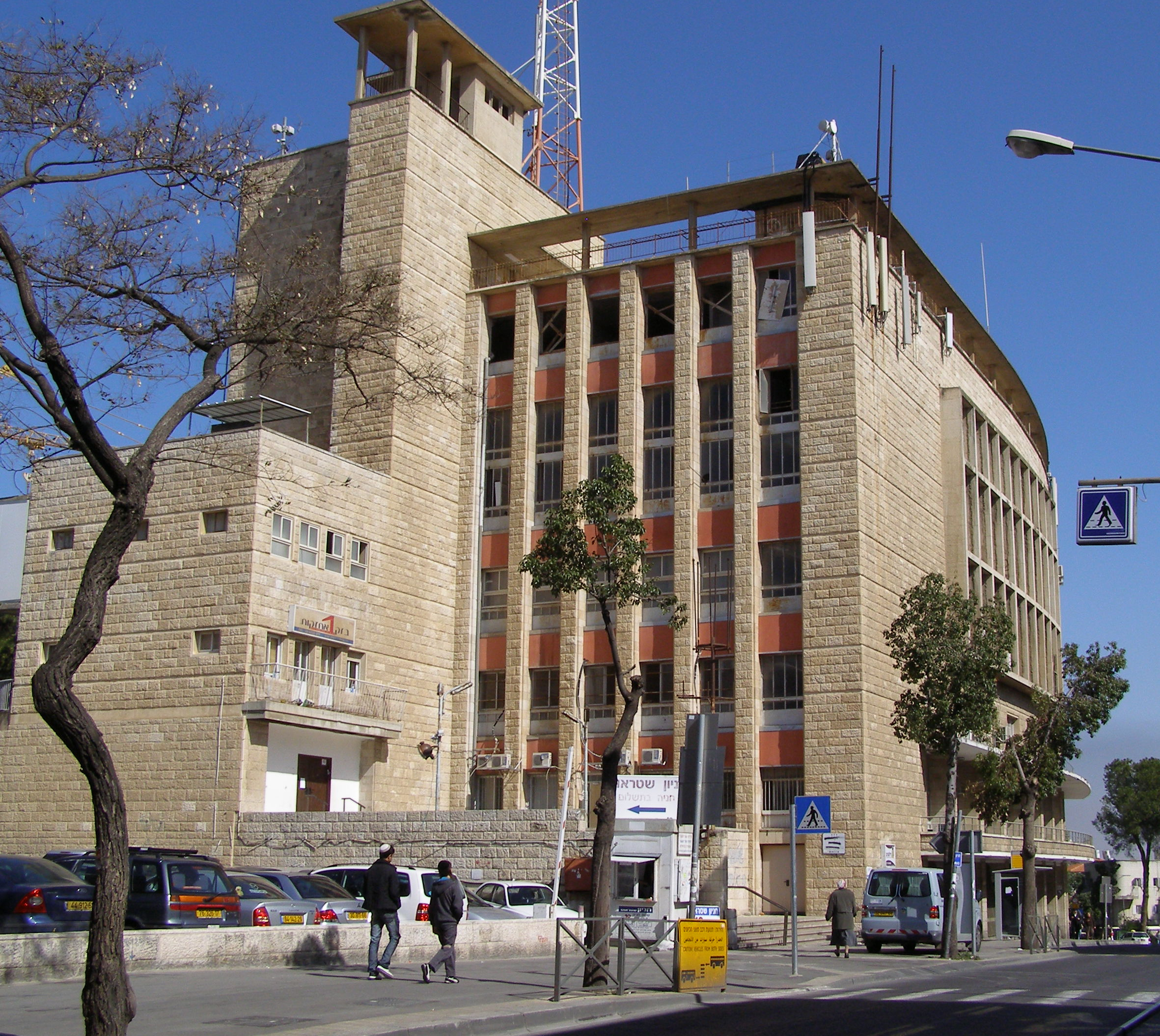
The Histadrut building on Straus Street.

After the establishment of the state of Israel, Straus Street became the dividing line between the secular culture of Jaffa Road and points south, and the Haredi culture of Mea Shearim and Geula to the north. In the early 1950s, the street was selected as the site for the new Histadrut building in order to block Haredi expansion southward. The original Histadrut building had been located on Histadrut Street in the city center. The imposing, seven-story building was designed by Fritz Shlezinger and completed in 1953. Like other Histadrut buildings around the country, the large, rectangular structure symbolized the power and influence of the Mapai left-wing political party. Erected at the highest point of the street, its rooftop held a commanding view of Mount Scopus and the Mount of Olives; during the Six-Day War, this rooftop served as the Jerusalem regimental headquarters for fighters attempting to liberate the Old City. Besides offices, the Histadrut building housed a movie theater and a hall that became the home court for the Jerusalem Hapoel Basketball Club beginning in the mid-1950s, as it was the only roofed facility in the country. More than 500 fans filled the hall every Friday night for home games. For many years, the presence of the Histadrut building effectively halted Haredi expansion south of Geula and Mea Shearim.

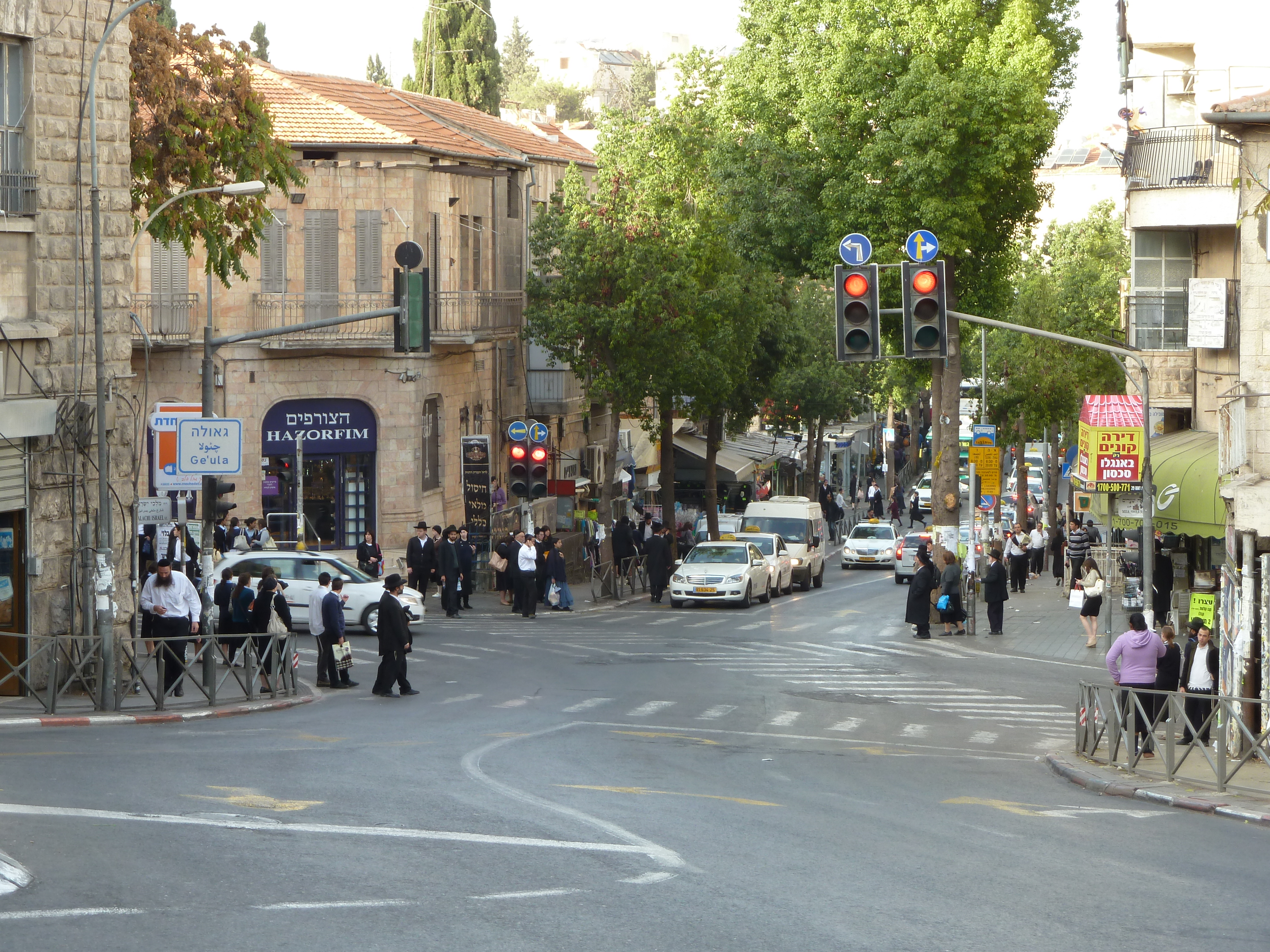
The view of Kikar HaShabbat, looking from Straus Street.

The first move toward Orthodoxy south of the Histadrut building was the 1979 opening of the Orthodox Union Israel Center at the corner of Straus and Street of the Prophets. Originally geared to Anglo students learning in Israel, the Israel Center expanded its services to provide aliyah services, shiurim (Torah lectures), Shabbatons, concerts, outings, a newsletter, and other programs for Jews of all ages and backgrounds. Rabbi Zev Leff began delivering his popular morning parashah shiur in 1982. In 2000 the Israel Center relocated to its current location on Keren Hayesod Street.

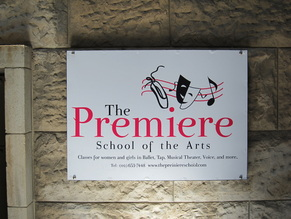
Entrance to the Haredi Premiere School of the Arts in the Histadrut building.

By the end of the twentieth century, the Histadrut building stood out as a secular anomaly amidst the predominantly Haredi occupancy of Straus Street. Eventually it, too, yielded to Haredi occupancy. In the 1990s a Haredi institute for professional training, Lomda, opened in the basement of the building. It was joined in 2003 by a Haredi fitness center; there is also a martial arts center in the building basement. In 2007 three unused floors of the building were rented out to a Haredi girl’s seminary, and a Haredi wedding hall opened on another floor in 2008, using the small parking lot in the back for chuppahs. In 2012, the Premiere School of the Arts, offering dance, voice, theater, and auxiliary fitness for religious, English-speaking women and girls, opened in the Histadrut building.

== Medical organizations ==
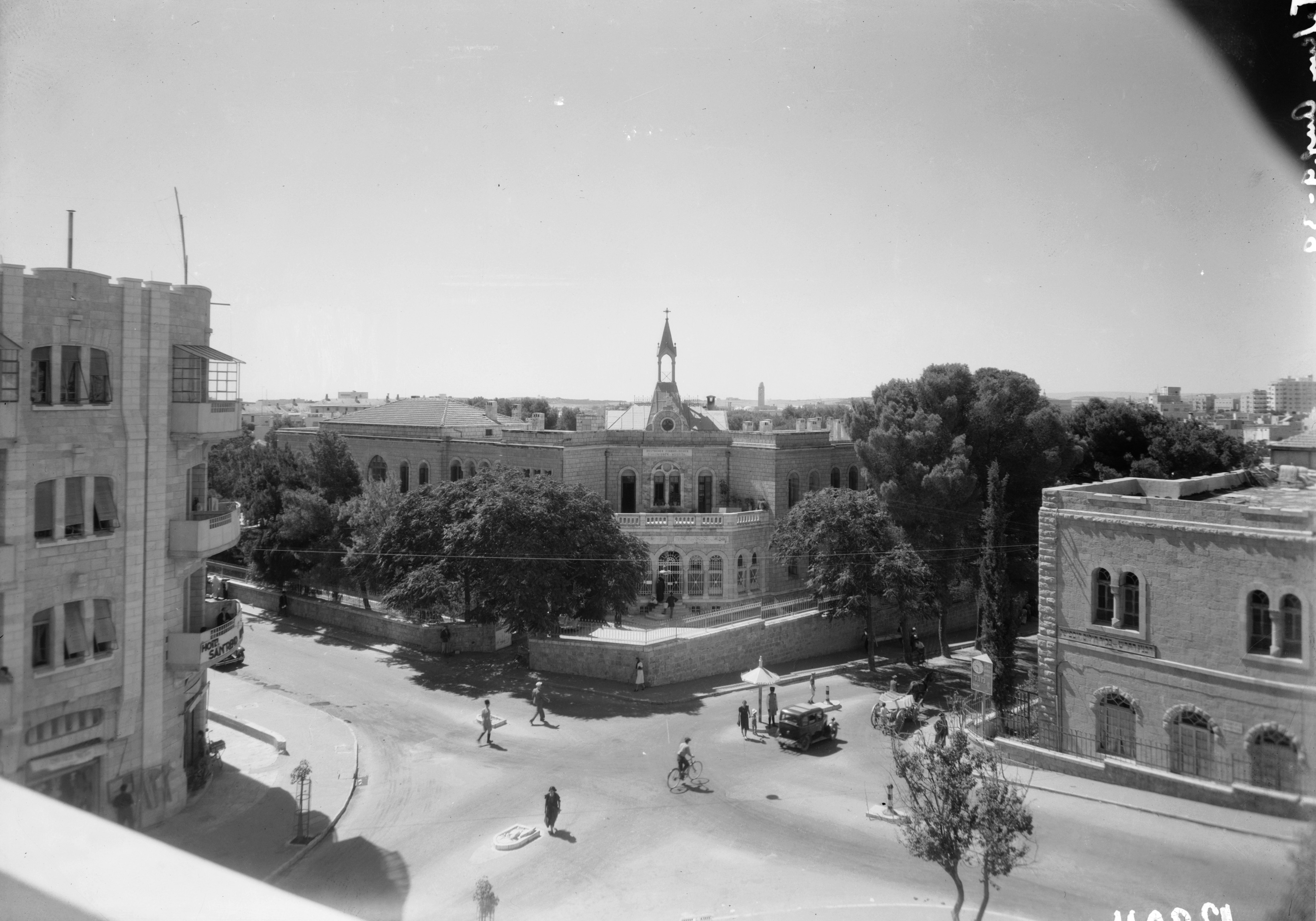
Corner of Straus Street and Street of the Prophets in 1939. The former German Hospital is at center and the newer Bikur Holim Hospital building is at right.

Straus Street is home to several medical organizations. At the intersection of Straus Street and Street of the Prophets, on the southeast corner, stands the former German Hospital, built in 1894, which became the Bikur Holim Hospital in 1925. In December 2012, the hospital was taken over by Shaare Zedek Medical Center. In 2020, the authorities decided to close the hospital completely. On the southwest corner stands a newer wing of Bikur Holim Hospital constructed between 1918 and 1925; this building is known for its three sets of double doors made of beaten copper depicting the twelve Tribes of Israel and biblical passages. On the northwest corner stands the former Israel Medical Association building.

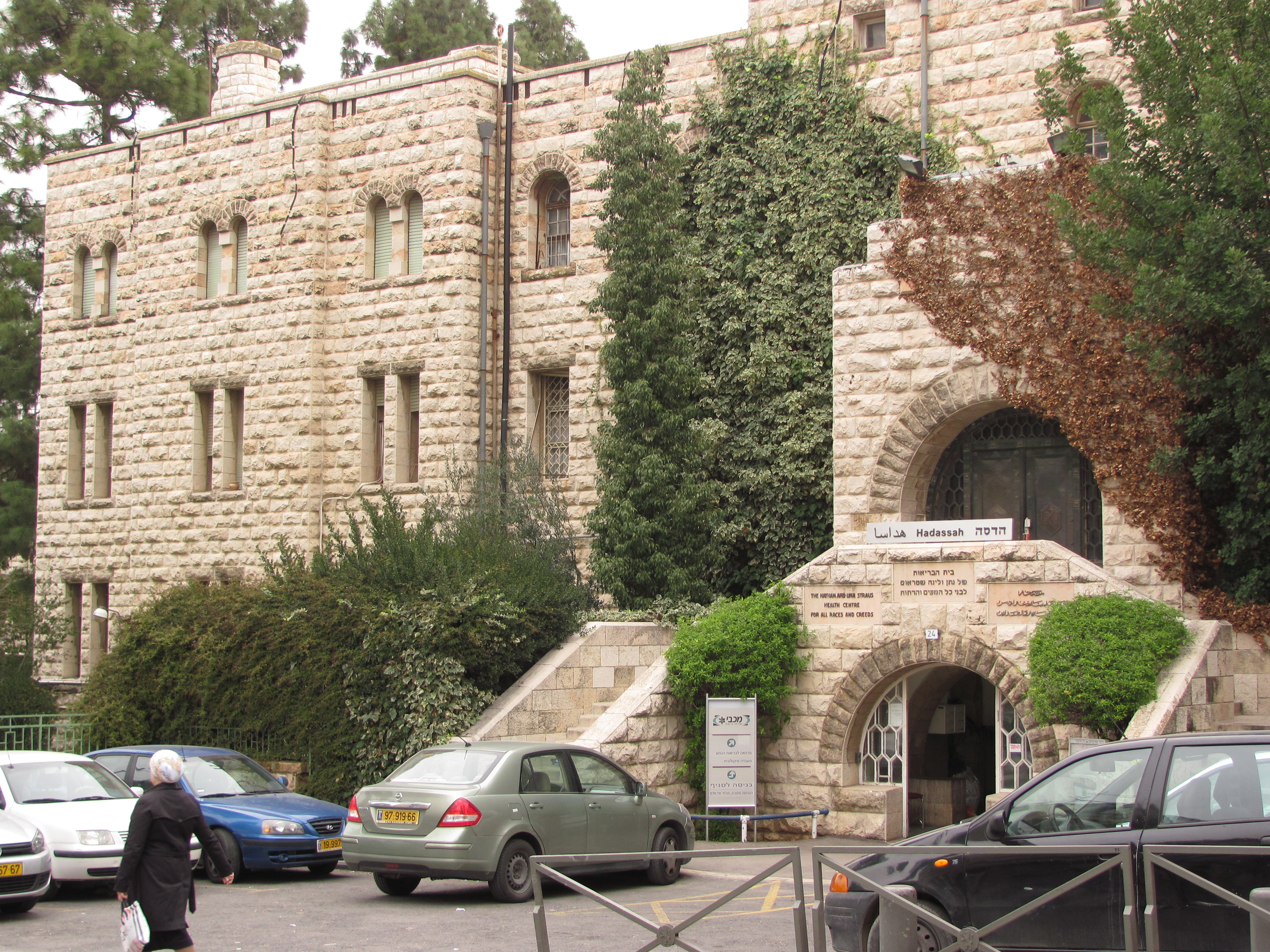
Nathan and Lina Straus Health Centre

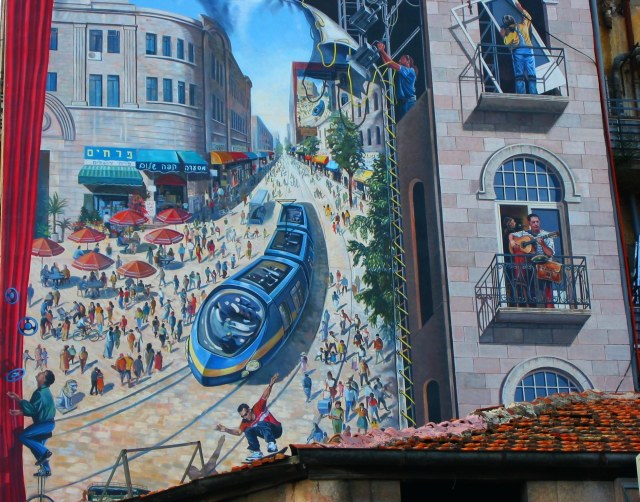
Close-up of the mural.

Straus Street is also the site of the Nathan and Lina Straus Health Centre. Straus gave $250,000 toward the construction of the center and came to Palestine in March 1927 to lay the cornerstone. He gave the building over to Hadassah Medical Center when it opened in 1929. From 1953 to 1964 the center housed the first dental school in Israel, founded by Hadassah and the Hebrew University of Jerusalem. Today the center houses clinics for the Maccabi and Leumit health funds, and a sleep medicine laboratory associated with Hadassah.

There is also a Straus Medical Center at #28 Straus, where Hadassah Medical Center, Maccabi Sherutei Briut and Clalit all hold medical offices.

== Haredi institutions ==
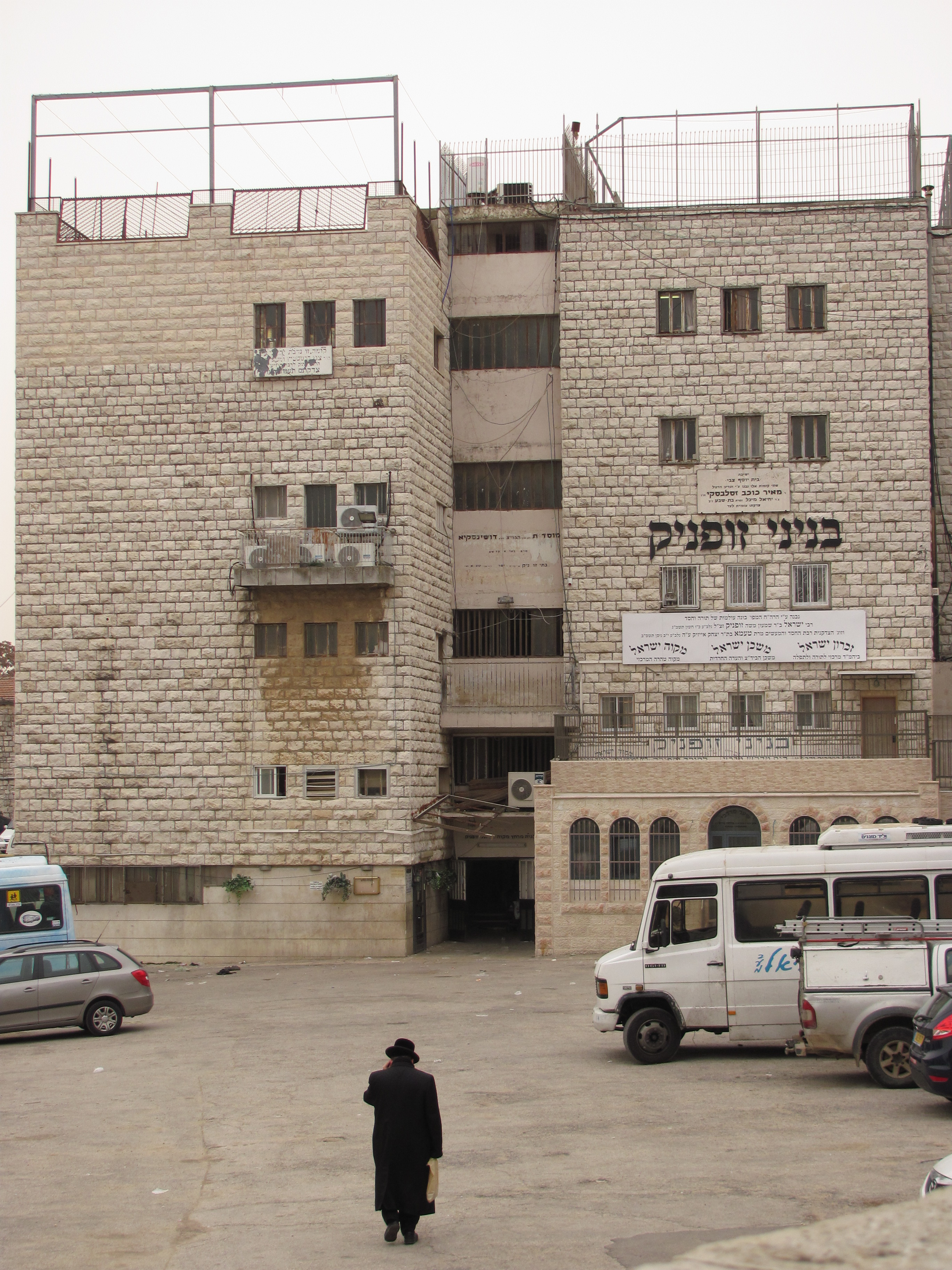
Kikar Zupnick

At the northern end of Straus Street are the headquarters of two important organizations in the Israeli Haredi community. Kikar Zupnick (Zupnick Square) is the headquarters of the Edah HaChareidis religious organization. Constructed in the 1920s, this building includes the organization’s offices, a rabbinical court, a beis medrash, a Talmud Torah, a yeshiva, and a mikveh. In the days leading up to the Sukkot holiday, the large lot fronting the building is covered with a tent and lulav and etrog sellers set out their wares on dozens of tables.

Kupat Rabbi Meir Baal HaNes–Kolel Polin, founded in 1796, is a charity aiding Israel’s poor.

== Other points of interest ==
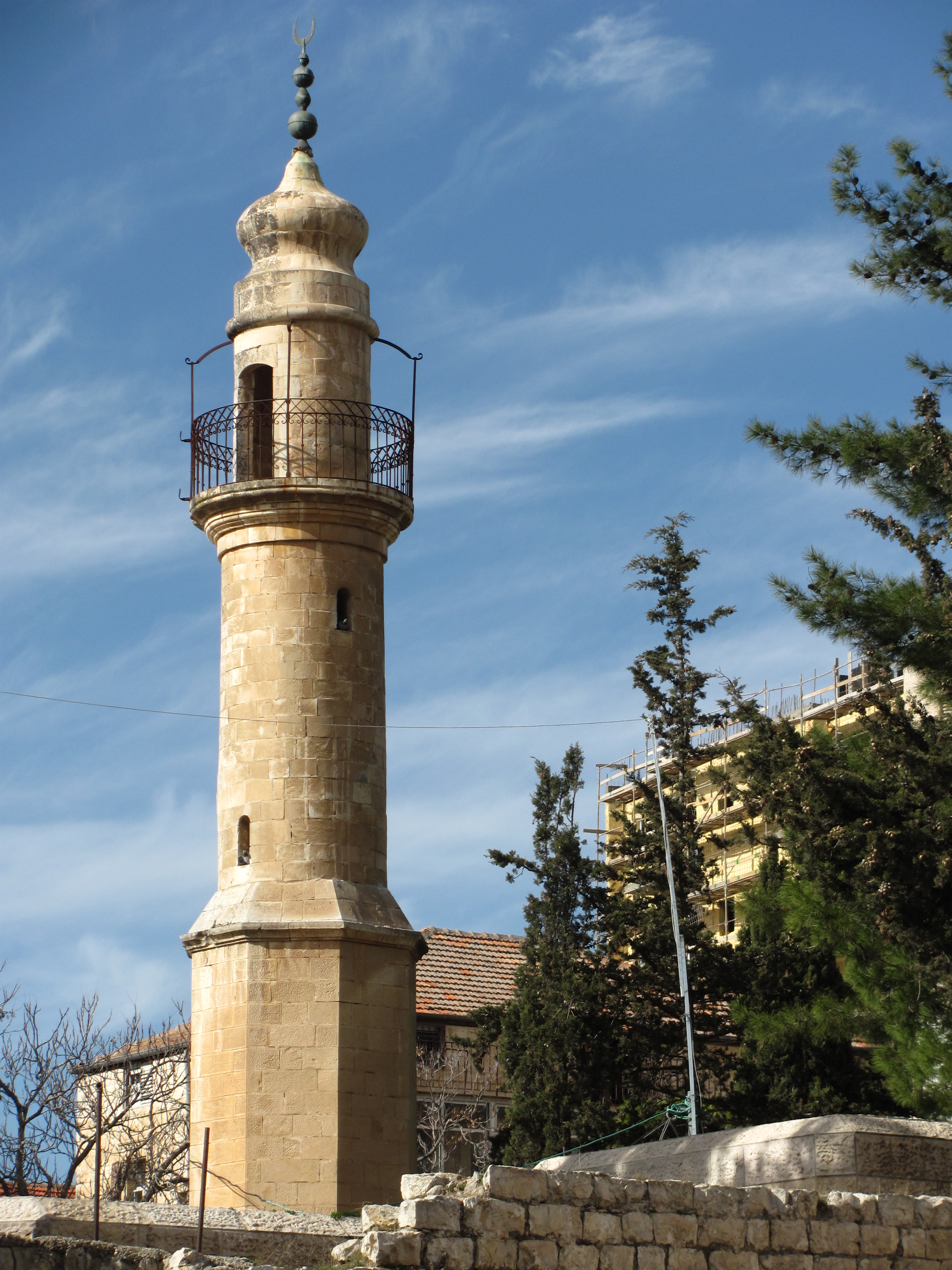
Nebi Akasha Mosque

On the west side of Straus Street, behind the Histadrut building, stands a nineteenth-century mosque and minaret named Nebi Akasha. The mosque has not functioned as such since the 1948 War of Independence, and is used by the Jerusalem municipality to store gardening supplies. A short distance from the mosque is the twelfth-century tomb of Nebi Akasha Bin Mohsin, one of the disciples of Muhammad. Between the mosque and the tomb is a small park named Turbat Qameria.

The apartment building on the northwest corner of Straus Street at Jaffa Road was one of the beneficiaries of a full-size mural painted by the Cite’ Cre’ation company of France. Beginning in 1999, the Jerusalem municipality contracted CitéCréation's street artists to spruce up poor and rundown parts of the city center with the realistic painting technique called trompe-l'œil. The Straus Street mural, painted in 2001, depicts the futuristic Jerusalem Light Rail running along Jaffa Road.

== Commercial development ==
Several businesses have operated on the street for decades. Zohar Cleaners, founded in the Bukharim neighborhood in 1940, moved to Straus Street in 1952. Bazaar Straus, a discount clothing store, opened here in the 1980s, as did HaSOFER, a store for products produced by sofrei stam, where they sell tefillin, mezuzahs, megillahs and Torah Scrolls.

== High-rise development ==
In the late 2000s, developers received permits to construct a number of high-rise luxury apartment buildings in the quadrant bordered by Jaffa Road, Straus Street, Street of the Prophets, and Harav Kook Street. The 13-story Straus Tower 1, which opens onto Straus Street, was completed in 2008.

== Transportation ==
For decades, Straus Street was a key one-way artery for buses traveling from Jerusalem's southern neighborhoods to its northern neighborhoods (return buses used the parallel Yeshayahu Street). In 2010, in conjunction with the introduction of a bus rapid transit route serviced by double articulated buses that can accommodate up to 140 passengers each, Straus and Yeshayahu Streets were converted into two-way streets.

Straus Street is the long-time terminus for a Jerusalem-Bnei Brak sherut (share taxi) service.
