= Zion Blumenthal Orphanage =

Orphanage in Jerusalem

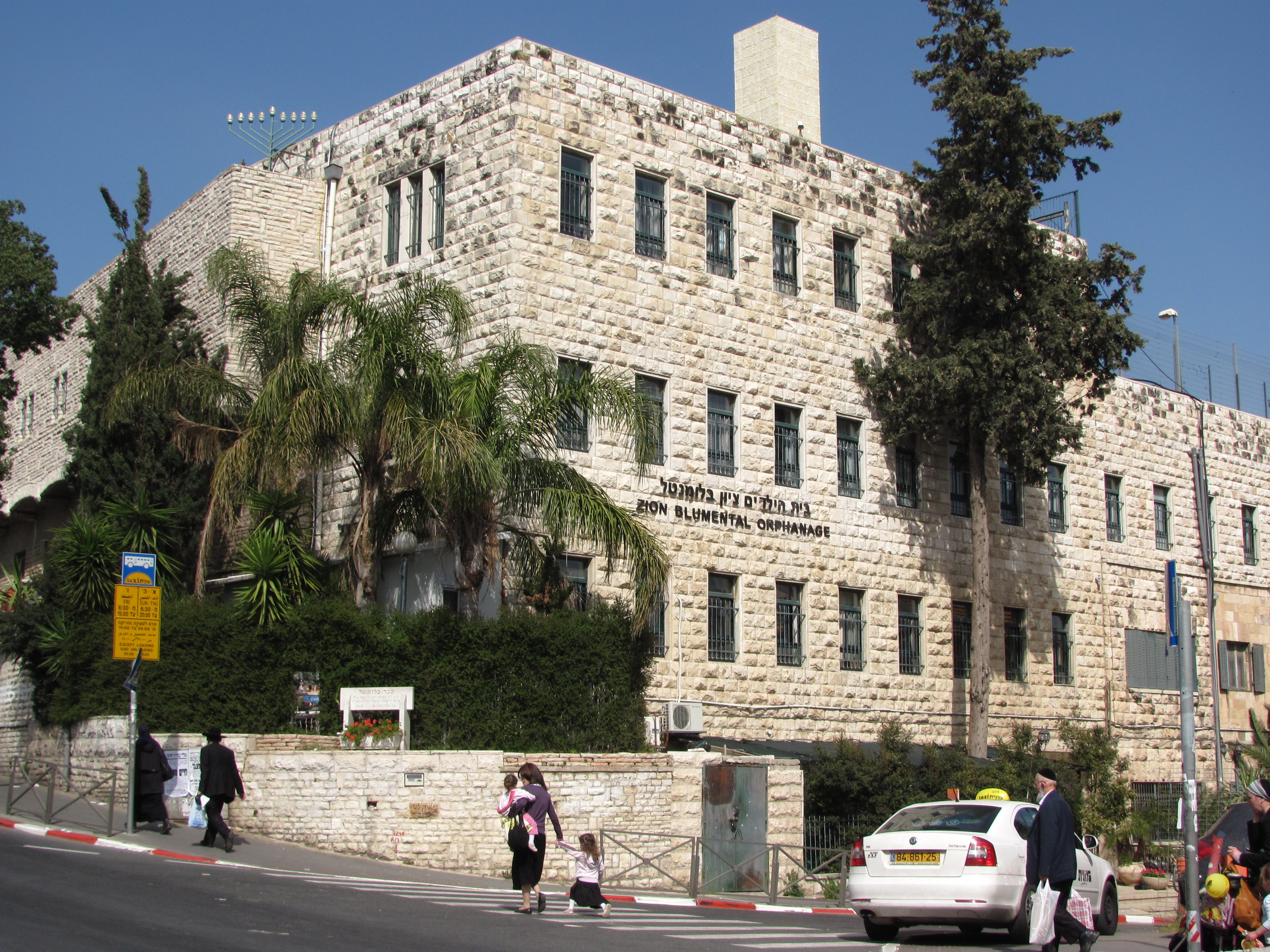
- Formation: 1900
- Headquarters: 16 Hoshea Street
- Location: Jerusalem
- Official language: Hebrew
- Key people: Rabbi Baruch Rakovsky, executive director Mrs. Rivka Rakovsky, director
- Website: www.zionorphanage.com
- Formerly called: Blumenthal Orphanage

Zion Blumenthal Orphanage (Hebrew: בית ציון בלומנטל ירושלים, Zion Blumenthal Home Jerusalem) is an Orthodox Jewish orphanage and educational institution in Jerusalem. Founded in 1900, it is the oldest active orphanage in Israel.

== History ==
The orphanage was founded near the Bukharim quarter in 1900 by Rabbi Abraham Yochanan Blumenthal (1877–1966), a native of Jerusalem, who led the orphanage for 50 years. Blumenthal's wife, Shaina, served as a director for 40 years. By 1920, the Blumenthal Orphanage was home to 85 orphans. It absorbed many orphans from World Wars I and II and the 1948 Arab-Israeli War.

The Blumenthal Orphanage was known for creating a family-like home environment for youth from many different religious communities – Sephardi, Ashkenazi, Hasidic, etc. The use of Hebrew as the official language of instruction further served to unite children of different countries and languages.

For many decades, the orphanage was a popular site for large events. It was the venue for the inauguration of the Chief Rabbi of Israel in 1921; the first tish of the Belzer Rebbe in Jerusalem after his escape from Nazi-occupied Europe in 1944; and the wedding of Rabbi Yosef Dov Soloveitchik, rosh yeshiva of the Brisker yeshiva in Israel, in 1946.

As the Geula neighborhood developed around the site of the orphanage, the institution became part of the Geula quarter. It is located two blocks north of the central intersection of Kikar HaShabbat. Its 1 acre (0.40 ha) corner lot on Hoshea and Yechezkel Streets has been named Kikar Blumenthal (Blumenthal Square) in honor of the founder, Rabbi Abraham Yochanan Blumenthal.

== Clientele ==
In its early years, the orphanage accommodated children whose parents had been killed by Arab marauders. Others were placed here by their poverty-stricken parents. Today, most of the residents are not orphans, but children whose parents have mental illness or addictions, or who are severely impoverished. Some are victims of physical or emotional abuse. The orphanage also accepts Jewish immigrant children from Russia and Ethiopia.

By the end of 2011, the orphanage houses 100 children ages 7 to 18. An additional 120 youth attend an on-site yeshiva high school named Yagdil Torah.

== Current activities ==
The orphanage building is constructed around a central courtyard. An outdoor playground, fully equipped gym, library and petting zoo are available to the residents. The orphanage provides afternoon extracurricular activities such as volleyball, gymnastics, music lessons, computer room, and gardening.

In 2004 the orphanage introduced the concept of mishpachtonim, or family units, for boys aged 7 to 14. There are currently five family units on the premises, where groups of 12 boys live in private apartments together with a young couple and their small children. The couple serve as dorm parents, serving and eating meals with the boys and looking after their daily needs.

== Faculty ==
Rabbi Baruch Rakovsky, great-grandson of the founder, is executive director. His mother, Mrs. Rivka Rakovsky, a granddaughter of the founder, is director.

== Notable alumni ==
Over the years, residents of the orphanage have gone on to become "rabbis, attorneys, accountants, clerks, teachers, and professional tradesmen". Notable alumni include Moshe Abutbul, mayor of Beit Shemesh, and David Azulai, member of Knesset for the Shas party since 1997.

== See also ==
- Education in Israel
