= Kikar HaShabbat =

Street intersection in Jerusalem, Israel

Coordinates: 31°47′18.06″N 35°13′6.83″E

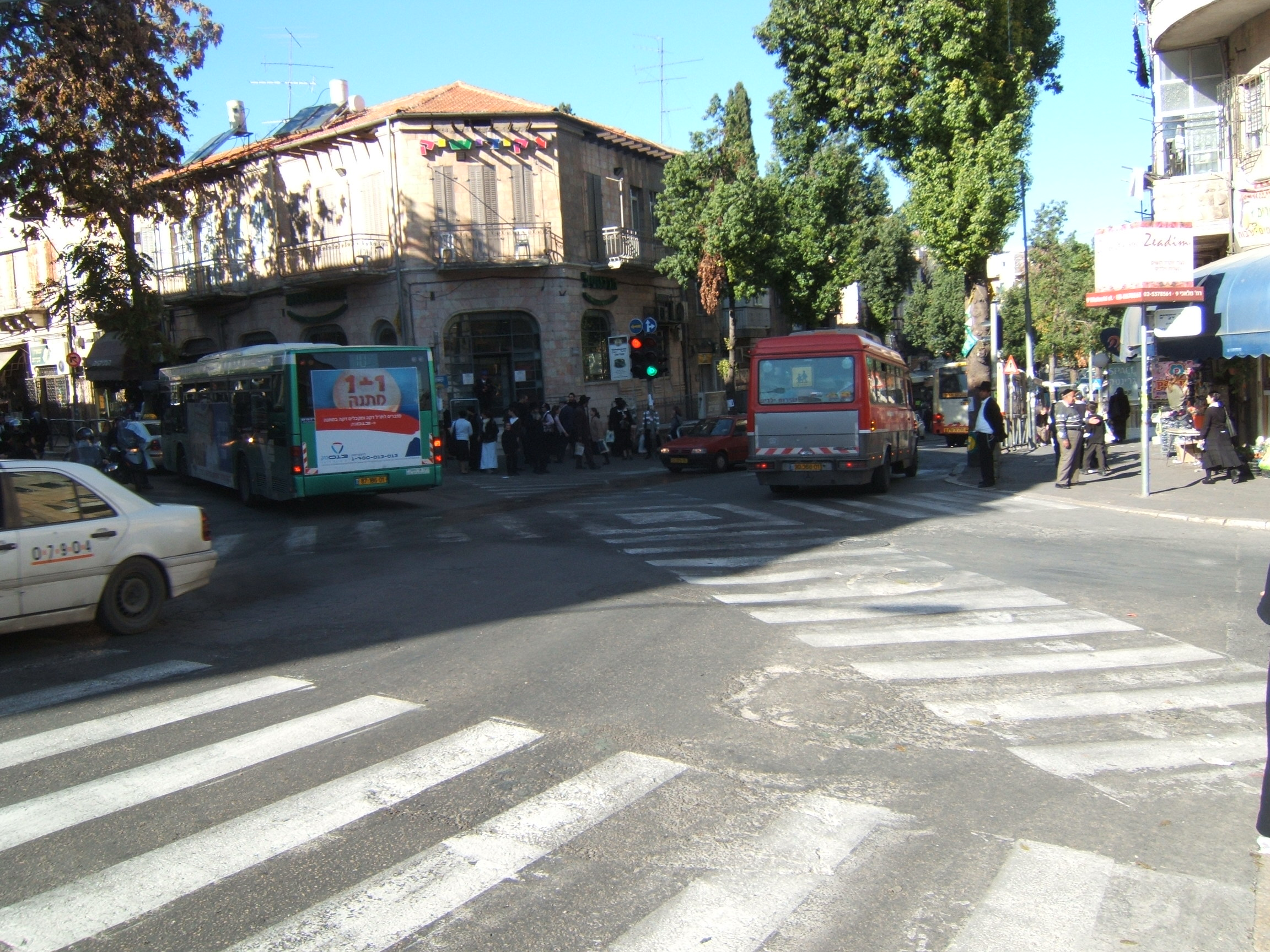
Kikar HaShabbat on a weekday.

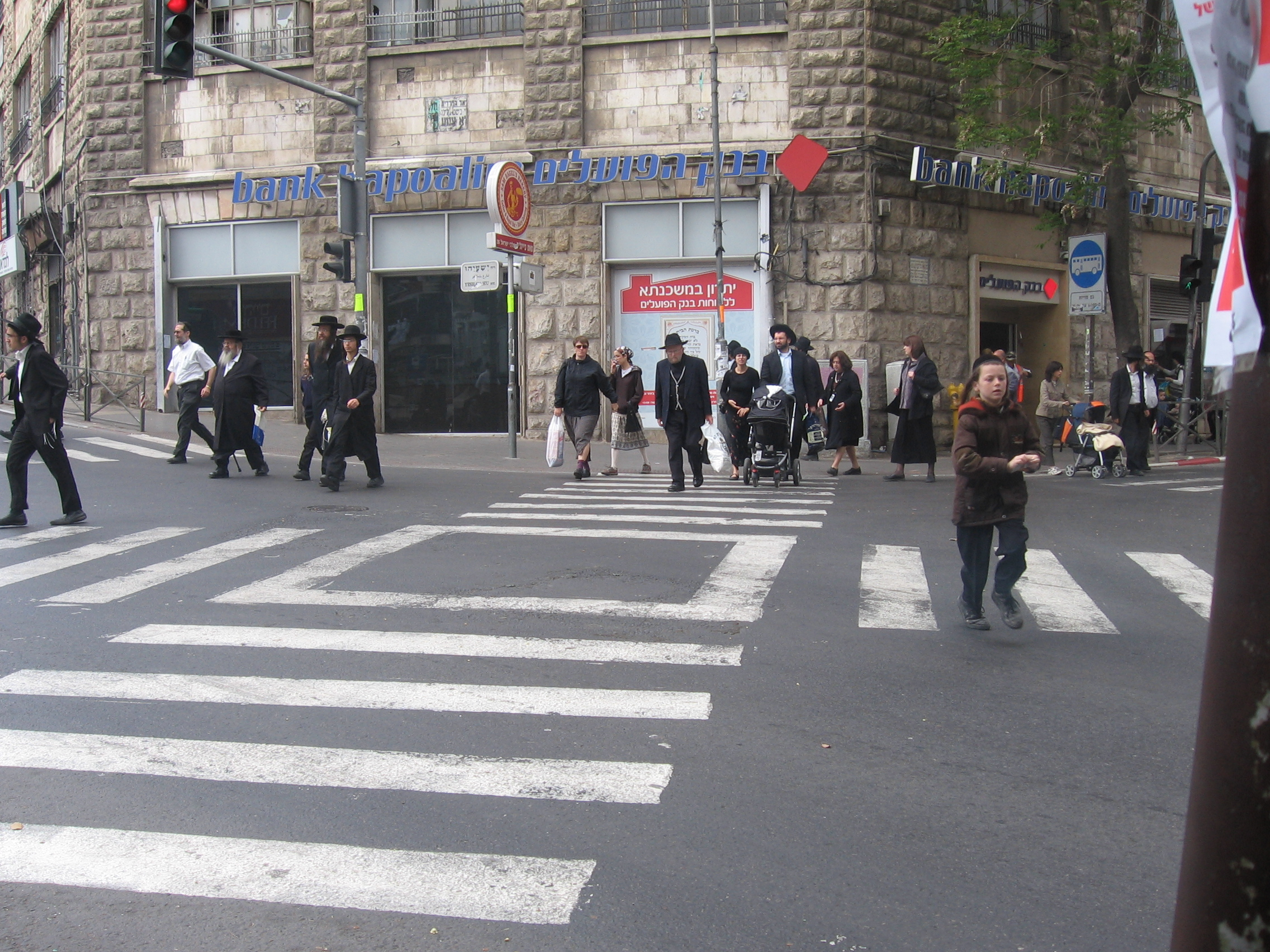
Kikar HaShabbat looking southeast.

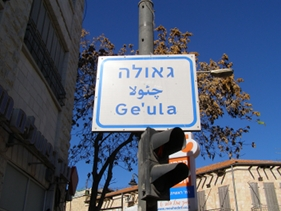
Kikar HaShabbat- The entrance to Geula.

Kikar HaShabbat (Hebrew: כיכר השבת, lit., "Sabbath Square"), known in the Haredi community as Kikar HaShabbos, is a major intersection joining five streets in Jerusalem, Israel, between Mea Shearim and Geula: Yehezkel Street from the north, Malkhei Yisrael Street from the west, Mea Shearim Street from the east, Straus Street from the southeast, and Yisha'ayahu Street from the southwest.

From the early years of the State of Israel, this intersection became a site of friction between religious and secular Jews over issues of Sabbath observance. Rallies and demonstrations held at this spot have sometimes turned violent. Due to its central location, the intersection is also a gathering place for community and holiday events, such as the second hakafah (ritual circling) held on the night after Simhat Torah.

== History ==
Tensions between Haredi Jews and the growing secular movement rose during the British Mandate period. One of dominant points of conflict was Shabbat violation by Jews driving their vehicles through the neighborhood on Shabbat. A "Shabbat War" evolved in which companies offered public transportation and sold agricultural produce on Shabbat. This led the Edah HaChareidis organization to ban produce of the Tnuva cooperative.

In June 1948, a mass demonstration against Shabbat violation was violently dispersed by the military police. The situation became more sensitive after the war. The most direct road from Mandelbaum Gate (a major army post on the border of divided Jerusalem) to the old Schneller Orphanage (which had become the supply center for Jerusalem military units), went straight through the main Haredi neighborhoods, as well as through Kikar HaShabbat. The frequent passage of military vehicles through these neighborhoods on Shabbat was the starting point for many demonstrations. The decision of the Edison and Eden theaters to open on Shabbat afternoons was another sore point.

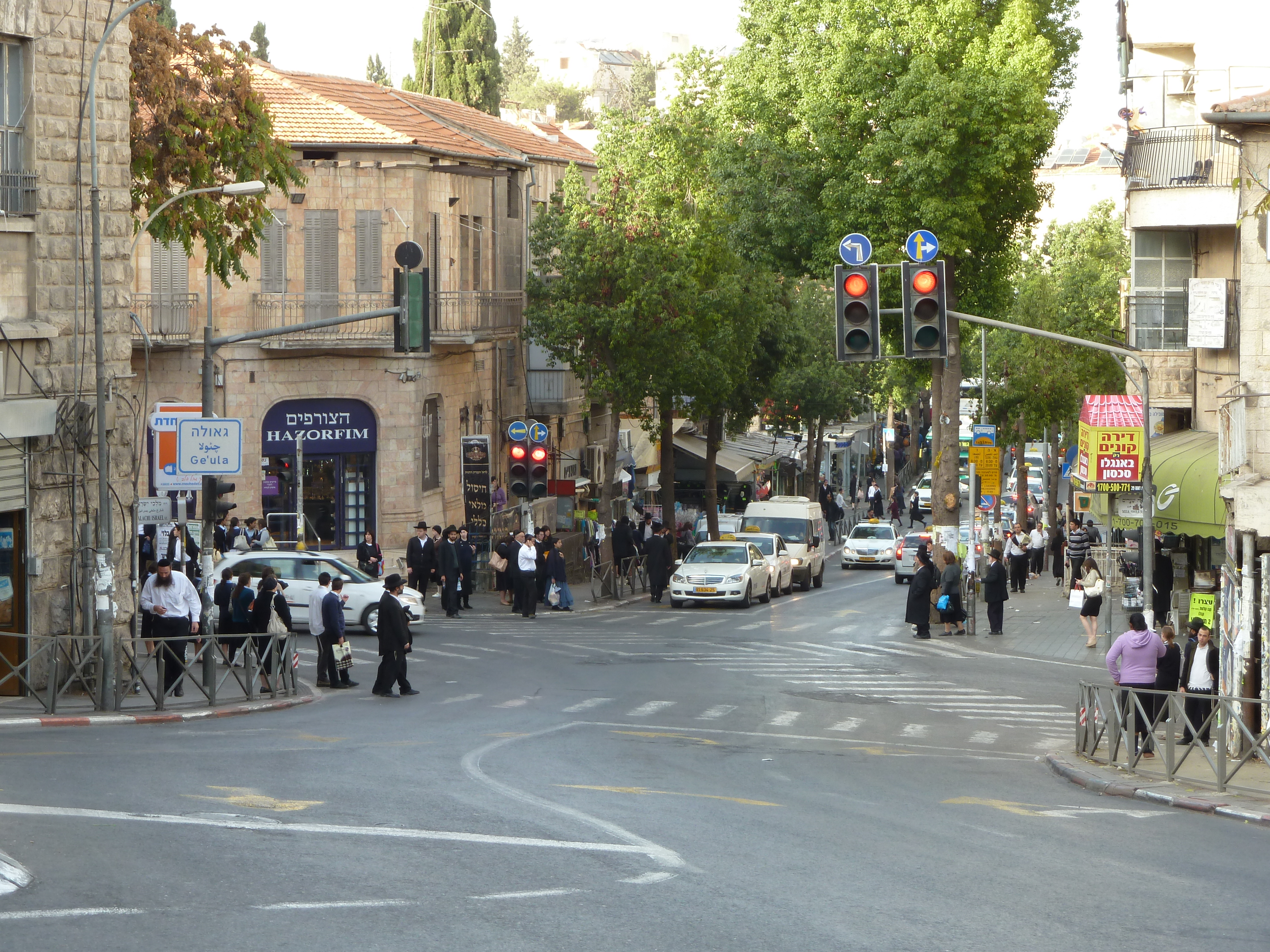
The view of Kikar HaShabbat, looking from Straus Street.

The summer of 1950 saw an intensification of the demonstrations and the move of the center to what is now known as Kikar HaShabbat. The Shabbat demonstrations at the intersection were often started by members of Neturei Karta, who opposed Zionism and rejected the authority of the secularist state. The intersection was traversed by military vehicles on a regular basis. The intersection has since been closed to motor vehicles on Shabbat and Jewish holidays. The Tnuva dairy factory, located near the intersection, received shipments of milk from settlements near Jerusalem on Shabbat as well as weekdays. Haredi demonstrators adopted a tactic known as "Fred" after one of the community's leaders. The demonstrators filled the street with people and marched back and forth, forcing the vehicles to navigate slowly through the crowd.

On August 12, 1950, three trucks of youth from Hashomer Hatzair movement arrived at a demonstration leading to rioting and police action. The demonstrations continued every Shabbat afternoon, throughout that and the following summers. In 1965 the intersection was officially closed to traffic on Shabbat, although it had already been closed de facto years before.

It's also widely known as the center of protest where a majority of demonstrations occur occasionally on multiple topics.
