= Schneller Orphanage =

German Protestant orphanage that operated in Jerusalem from 1860 to 1940

- German: Syrisches Waisenhaus
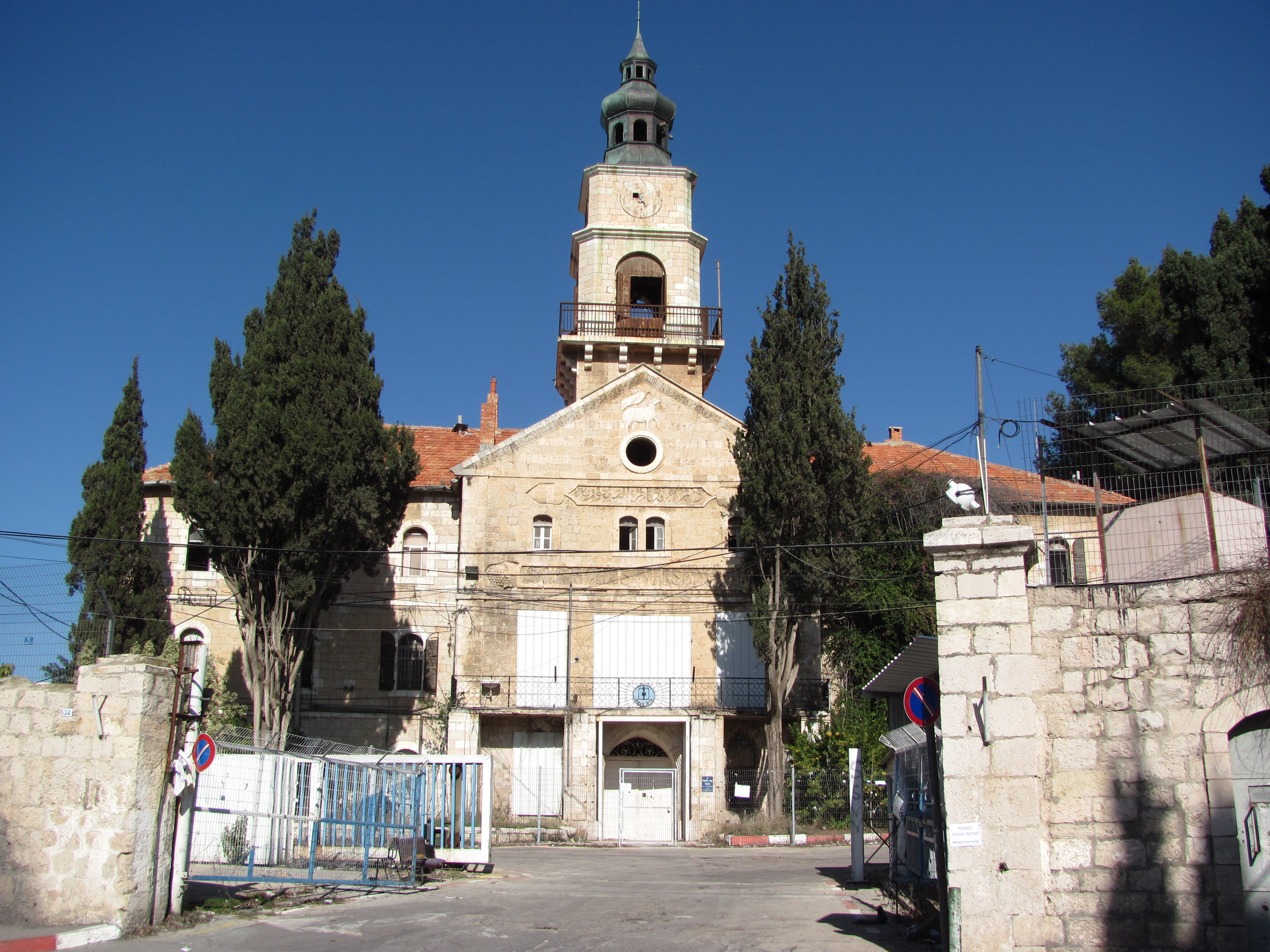
- Schneller Orphanage main building
- Interactive map of the Schneller Orphanage area
- Alternative names: Syrian Orphanage

General information
- Type: Orphanage
- Architectural style: South German
- Location: 34 Malkhei Yisrael Street; Jerusalem
- Coordinates: 31.7908°N 35.2127°E
- Current tenants: none
- Construction started: 1855
- Inaugurated: 1856

Design and construction
- Architect: Johann Ludwig Schneller

Schneller Orphanage, also called the Syrian Orphanage, was a German Protestant orphanage that operated in Jerusalem from 1860 to 1940.

It was one of the first structures to be built outside the Old City of Jerusalem – the others being Kerem Avraham, the Bishop Gobat school, Mishkenot Sha’ananim, and the Russian Compound – and paved the way for the expansion of Jerusalem in the 19th century. As a philanthropic institution offering academic and vocational training to hundreds of orphaned and abandoned Arab children, it also exerted a strong influence on the Arab population of Jerusalem and the Middle East through its graduates, who spread its philosophies of "orderliness, discipline, and German language" throughout the region. The Syrian Orphanage was born out of South German Pietism, which combined Biblicism, idealism, and religious individualism.

The orphanage provided both academic and vocational training to orphaned boys and girls from Palestine, Syria, Egypt, Ethiopia, Armenia, Turkey, Russia, Iran, and Germany, graduating students skilled in such trades as tailoring, shoemaking, engraving, carpentry, metalworking, pottery, painting, printing, farming, and gardening. In 1903 a school for the blind was opened on the premises, including dormitories, classrooms and vocational workshops. The orphanage also operated its own printing press and bindery; flour mill and bakery; laundry and clothing-repair service; carpentry; pottery factory; tree and plant nursery; and brick and tile factory. Located on high ground and surrounded by a high stone wall, the orphanage's distinctive onion-dome tower, multistory buildings, and decorative facades exuded the power and influence of European Christians in Jerusalem in the mid-19th century.

Continuous building and land acquisitions increased the size of the orphanage grounds to nearly 150 acres (600 dunam) by World War I. At the beginning of World War II, the British mandatory government deported the German teachers and turned the compound into a closed military camp with the largest ammunition stockpile in the Middle East. On March 17, 1948, the British abandoned the camp and the Etzioni Brigade of the Haganah used it as a base of operations during the 1948 Arab-Israeli war. For the next 60 years the site served as an Israeli army base known as Camp Schneller. The army vacated the premises in 2008. As of 2011, the compound is being developed for luxury housing.

In 2015, remains of a Jewish settlement of the late Second Temple period were discovered at the site. In 2016, archaeologists unearthed an ancient Roman bathhouse and a large wine production facility.

== History ==
=== J. L. Schneller's family house (1854-60) ===
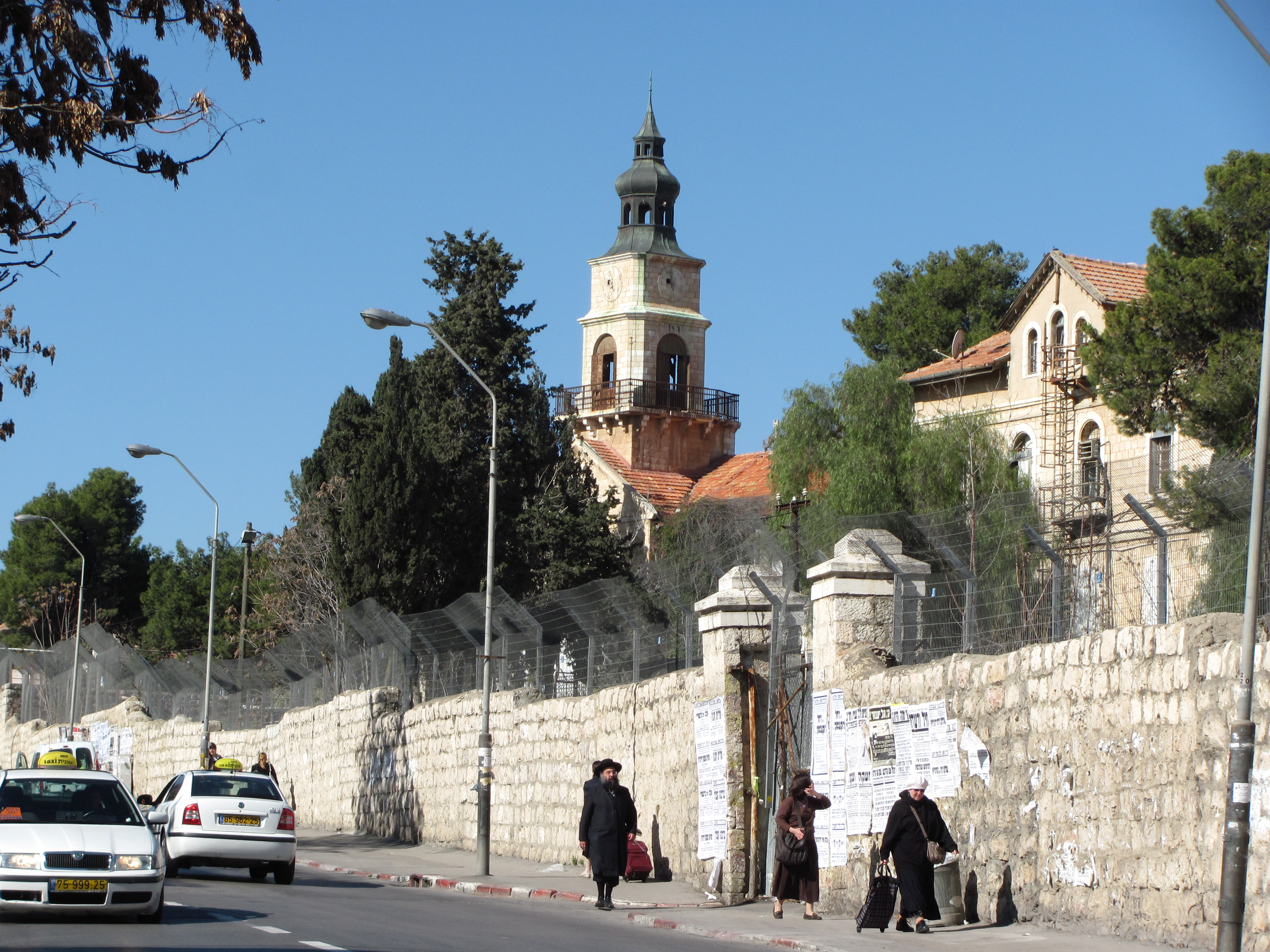
View of the onion-dome tower and other buildings of the Schneller Orphanage from Malkhei Yisrael Street

In the mid-19th century, English and German Protestant missions were operating in the Old City of Jerusalem. In 1854 de:Johann Ludwig Schneller (1820–1896), a German Lutheran missionary, came to Jerusalem from Württemberg together with his wife Magdalene Böhringer and six other members of the Brüdergemeinde of Saint Chrischona, Riehen, Switzerland, in order to manage the German Protestant mission. On 11 October 1855 Schneller bought from the people of Lifta a parcel of land outside their village, approximately 3 kilometres (1.9 mi) northwest of Jaffa Gate, with the intention of living among and missionising to the local Arab population, and drew up plans for the construction of a home for his family. The house was constructed from 1855 to 1856. After Schneller and his family took occupancy, the house was attacked several times by Arab robbers from the village of Beit Sorek, forcing them to retreat to the safety of the Old City. At the end of the decade, after the Turks had erected outposts and dispatched armed guards on horseback to patrol Jaffa Road (the route between Jerusalem and the port city of Jaffa, which lay near the Schneller compound), Schneller and his family were able to return to their home.

=== Schneller's Syrian Orphanage (est. 1860) ===
In 1860 Lebanese Druze massacred thousands of Maronite Christians in Lebanon and Syria. Schneller travelled to Beirut with the intention of rescuing battle-orphaned children. He was rebuffed by the local community, which did not trust foreign Protestant missionaries, but managed to bring back nine orphaned boys to Jerusalem in October 1860. He decided to open an orphanage for them in his home, and by the end of 1861 had enrolled 41 boys in what became known as the Syrian Orphanage (German: Syrisches Waisenhaus). Over the next four years Schneller expanded his property to 13.6 acres (55 dunam) and erected a 3.5 metres (11 ft)-high stone wall around it. Through 1867 Schneller expanded and added new infrastructure, creating a kitchen, dining room, storage cellar, bedrooms and living areas. In 1867 the orphanage began accepting girls.

Funds for construction and expansion, together with clothing and blankets, were solicited from Protestant communities in Germany and Switzerland. Between 1861 and 1885 Schneller collected a total of 550,000 francs in donations.

=== Enrollment, staff and curriculum ===
Schneller was determined to give orphaned and abandoned Arab children a complete education, including teaching them a trade. To that end, he employed both academic and vocational teachers, primarily from Germany. The latter led professional workshops in tailoring, shoemaking, engraving, carpentry, metalworking, pottery, painting, printing, farming, and gardening.

Children stayed at the orphanage for up to 10 years, graduating at the age of 18. They came from all parts of Palestine as well as Syria, Egypt, Ethiopia, Armenia, Turkey, Russia, Iran, and Germany. They were also of differing religious denominations, including Protestant, Greek Orthodox, Catholic, Coptic, and Maronite. Notwithstanding the ethnic diversity of the student body, the language of instruction was German and Arabic. Most of the teachers employed during the orphanage's first 50 years were German, with some Armenians and Arabs.

In 1876 the orphanage had an enrollment of 70 students aged 4 to 17. By 1898 enrollment stood at 200 students. By the time of Schneller's death on 18 October 1896, 1500 students had passed through the orphanage's doors. The actual number of graduates totaled 425 in 1885 and 1169 at the 50th anniversary of the orphanage in 1910.

=== The school for the blind, 1901 ===
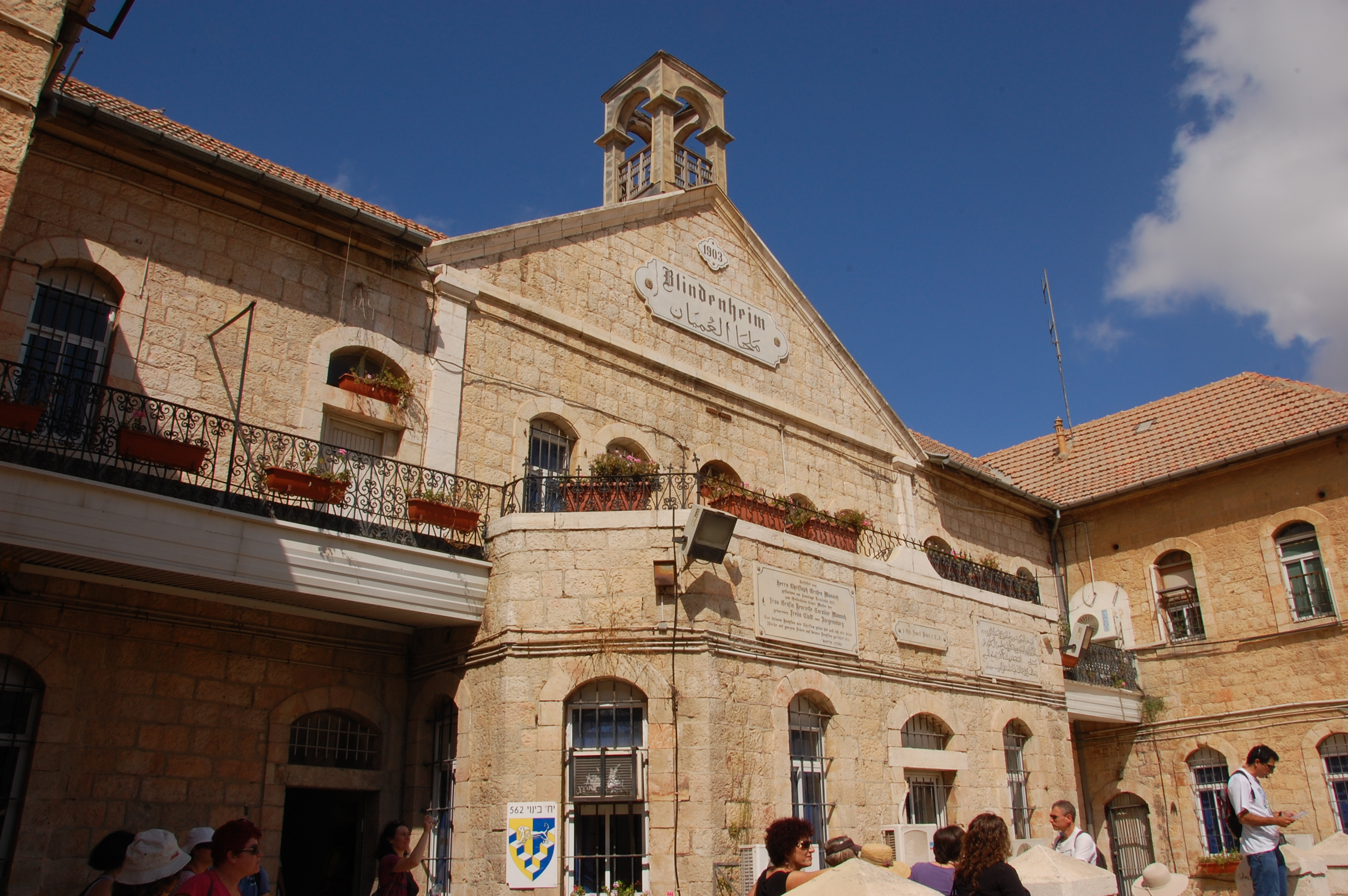
Blindenheim, the school for the blind, erected in 1903

In 1901 a German noble bequeathed his entire fortune of 700,000 marks toward the establishment of a school for the blind at the orphanage. It opened in 1903 with space for 40 to 50 children, plus workshops to teach the blind weaving and spinning.

=== Expansion ===
Besides classes and vocational workshops, the orphanage operated its own printing press and bindery where it produced its own textbooks, Braille books, and German-language newspapers. It also operated a flour mill and bakery that produced 35,000 loaves of bread a year, a laundry and clothing-repair service, a carpentry, a pottery factory that produced all the clay utensils used in the orphanage, and a tree and plant nursery. At the beginning of the 20th century, a large brick and tile factory was erected on the premises, which produced one million bricks and 250,000 tiles annually.

In 1889 Schneller acquired 1,235 acres (5,000 dunam) in Bir Salem (today Kibbutz Netzer Sereni) in order to develop an agricultural school and land for settlement for his students and graduates. In 1906 another 890 acres (3,600 dunam) was added to the original parcel. Although the agricultural school did not materialise, the grain, fruits and vegetables produced by the farm supplemented the orphanage diet during the food shortages of World War I.

=== Administration after J. W. Schneller (1889-1940) ===
In 1889 Schneller gave over the operation of the orphanage to a consortium based in Stuttgart, while his eldest son, Theodor (1856–1935), became manager of the institution. In 1927 Theodor's youngest son, Ernst, took over the management of the institution until its confiscation by the British in 1940.

=== Under the direction of the Near East Relief Committee (1919-1920) ===
The orphanage was under the direction of the Near East Relief Committee for over a year when the first issue of the The Jerusalem News appeared on December 9, 1919. It was printed by the orphans of the Syrian Orphanage and in the English language. Near East Relief was established by a United States Charter during the Armenian Genocide and its goal was to deliver humanitarian assistance to the refugees and orphans of the Near East, regardless of race or religion, although the majority of the victims and refugees were of ethnic Armenian origin. During and in the aftermath of the Armenian Genocide of 1915–1923, it is estimated that 1.5 million Armenians were systematically massacred by the Ottoman and later by modern Turkish governments.

== Architecture ==
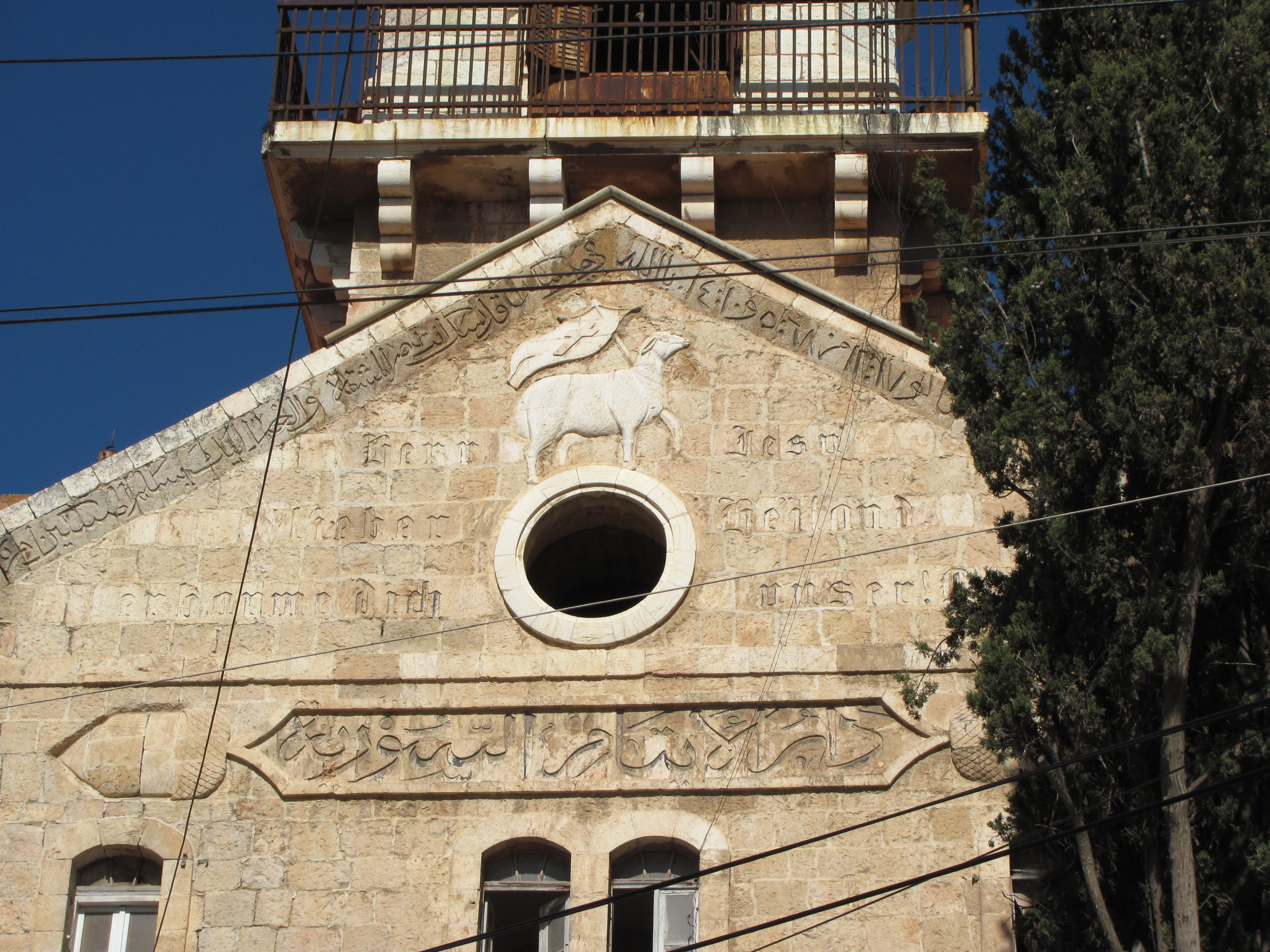
Close-up of epigram in German and Arabic on the main building's façade

Like other European Christian institutions built in Jerusalem in the 1800s, the Schneller Orphanage was situated on high ground and was surrounded by a high stone wall, with an iron gate that was locked at night. The property exuded the power and influence of European Christians in Jerusalem with its multistory buildings, a clock tower, and decorative façade, including reliefs in stone and epigrams. Engraved on the façade of the main building is the verse "Jesus the Messiah, have compassion upon us!" in German and Arabic, as well as the name of the institution, Syrian Orphanage (German: Syrisches Waisenhaus). There is also a stone relief of a lamb carrying a flag with a cross on it. Following the visit of Kaiser Wilhelm to Jerusalem in 1898, the orphanage received three bells for its tower.

The architectural style of the main building is a combination of Southern German and local Arabic. The tile roof and onion-dome tower mounted on a square base reflects the former, while wide, rounded arches for doors and windows reflect the latter. A lightning rod extends from the onion dome. The H-shaped main building has two interior courtyards which held a water cistern, garden and play area. The entire building covers an area of 50,590 square feet (4,700 square meters). At three stories, the main building housed the central dining room, a kitchen, a study hall, a library, a reading room, a small museum, and a Lutheran church in which students and staff worshipped.

Johann Ludwig Schneller brought in skilled Arab laborers from Bethlehem and Beit Jala to construct a total of eight buildings, which were constructed in stages and completed in the early 20th century. The year of completion and the name of the German city in which the donors for that building lived were engraved on each building façade. One of the buildings, called “the Red House” or “the model house,” was built entirely from materials produced on the orphanage grounds, including bricks, floor tiles and wrought-iron work.

For most of its existence, the orphanage was in a continual state of expansion and modernization. Ruth Kark et al. notes:

... the locksmith-shop was remodeled and changed location within the complex five times between the period of 1861 and 1930 (1861, 1867, 1900, 1908, 1930). The bakery changed place and was modernized six times and – in a similar way – most of the functions and uses of the rooms changed during the seventy years of the institution’s existence.

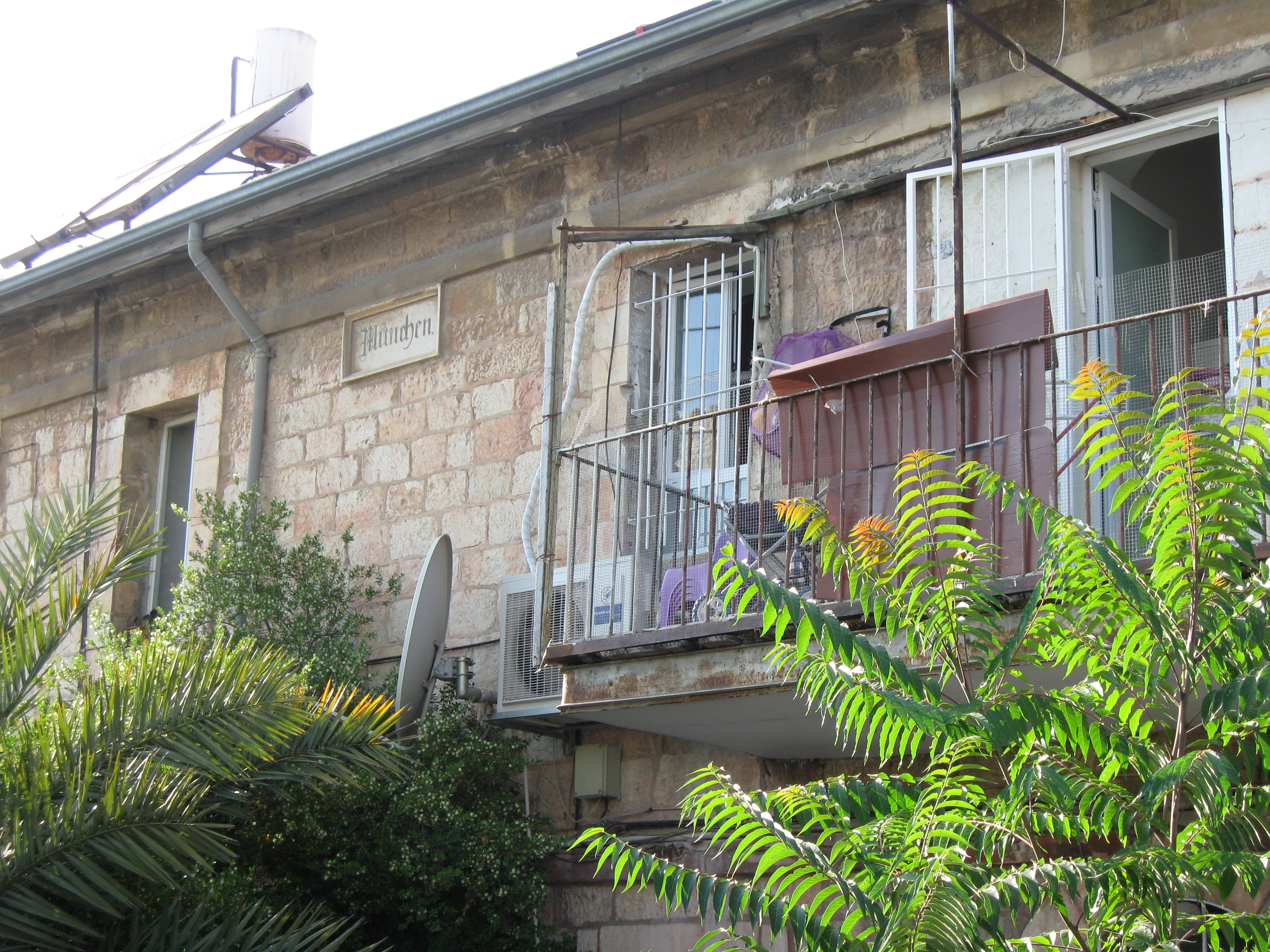
One of the Schneller Houses, bearing the German city name of Munich (München).

Johann Ludwig Schneller also purchased land in the vicinity of the orphanage and constructed houses for workers. Two of these Batei Schneller (Schneller Houses) still stand across the street from the main entrance, as well as three of the original five homes built several yards to the west (near the present corner of Malkhei Yisrael and Sarei Yisrael Streets). A plaque on each home bears the name of the German city of its donors. The cities are: Halle, Stuttgart, Kletz, Munich, Hamburg, Petersberg, and Erpfingen, Schneller's birthplace.

== 20th century ==
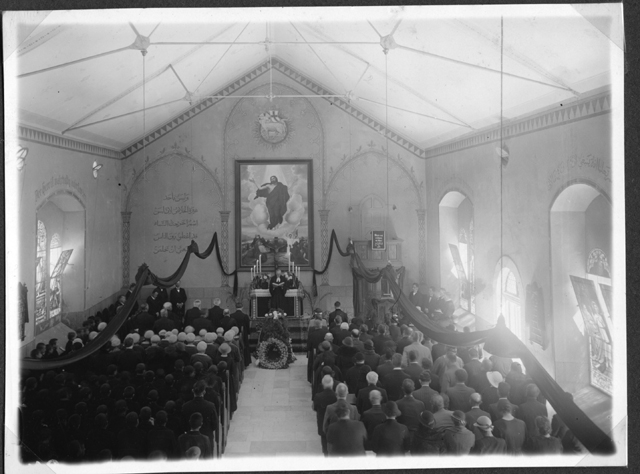
1935 funeral service for Theodor Schneller in the orphanage's Lutheran church.

By 1903 the educational facility had grown to eight buildings and included the orphanage, the school for the blind, and vocational workshops for youth.

In 1910, the jubilee year of the orphanage's founding, a fire destroyed the third floor and wooden roof of the main building, and damaged the second floor where the church was housed. Ludwig Schneller, a son of the founder who was the administrator at the time, managed to collect over 200,000 marks in donations from Germany and rebuilt the entire structure. The upper story of the building was rebuilt in stone.

Building and expansion continued up to World War I, by which time the orphanage occupied 150 acres (600 dunam) of land. The Schneller grounds reached all the way to present-day Romema, where Schneller planted forests on land that eventually housed the Jerusalem Biblical Zoo. The orphanage's holdings were gradually reduced to 17.5 acres with the sale of land to the new neighborhoods of Mekor Baruch and Kerem Avraham.

During World War I, the compound was used by the Ottoman army and its allies as a barracks. From 1921 to 1927, Theodor Schneller resumed management of the orphanage, overseeing the modernization of the property with electrical and sewage installations, as well as new machinery for the various workshops. His son Ernst directed the orphanage from 1927 until its confiscation by the British army in 1940. The orphanage's German funding sources were severely curtailed during the 1930s when the Nazi government of Germany banned citizens from sending funds abroad.

== Military base ==
=== British military camp ===
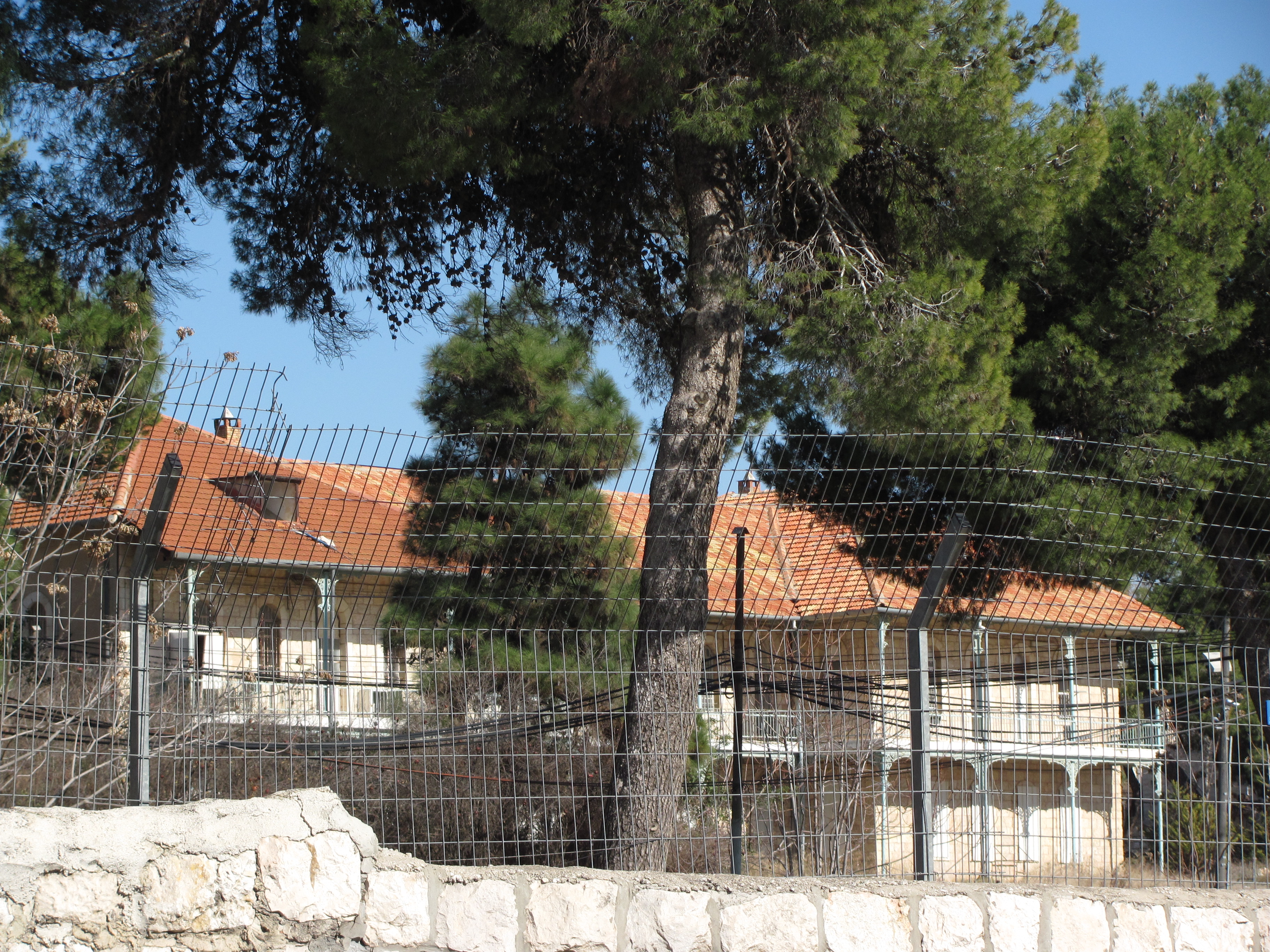
One of the orphanage buildings, behind a high stone wall and protective fencing

When World War II broke out, the British shut down the orphanage and deported its German teachers. The British turned the compound into a closed military camp known as the Schneller Barracks, installing about 50 watchtowers and huts. The camp housed the largest ammunition stockpile in the Middle East, as well as grain storehouses. The Royal Army Pay Corps 90th Battalion occupied the barracks in the late 1940s.

The British camp was targeted for attack by the Irgun on two occasions. On 27 June 1939, the paramilitary group placed a letter bomb in the mailbox attached to the outside wall; the subsequent explosion collapsed part of the wall and injured five Arabs in the vicinity. On 12 March 1947, the Irgun penetrated the camp itself in a pre-dawn operation and detonated explosives in one of the buildings to protest the imposition of martial law on Jerusalem. One British soldier was killed and eight injured in the blasts; martial law was lifted four days later.

=== Israeli military base ===
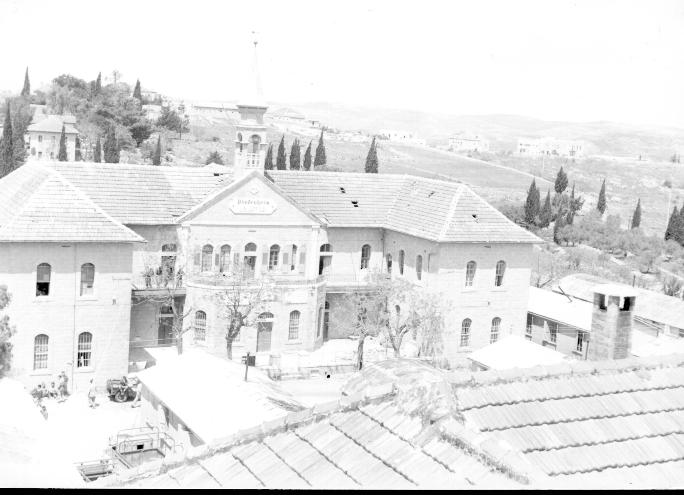
Schneller Orphanage after occupation by Palmach

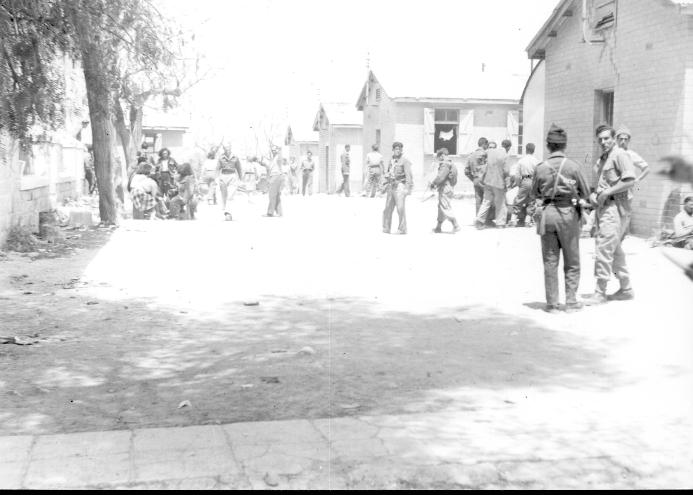
Harel Brigade stationed in the orphanage, 1948

On 17 March 1948, the British abandoned the camp and the Etzioni Brigade of the Haganah used it as a home base during the 1948 Arab-Israeli War. For the next 60 years, the compound served as a training base for the Israel Defense Forces and an army clinic; at one point, it also served as headquarters for the Home Front Command.

In 1951 the Israeli army summoned representatives of the World Lutheran Church to remove religious artifacts from the orphanage church; church representatives removed bells, windows and a pipe organ, but left the heavy marble altar encased in a wooden chest. The church was then converted into a basketball arena for the soldiers. In October 2009, on a tour of the facility after the army had vacated the grounds, the provost of the Evangelical German Lutheran Church of the Redeemer noticed the chest and asked for it to be opened, exposing the altar. The Lutherans negotiated for it to be moved to the Lutheran church at Augusta Victoria Hospital, where it was inaugurated in November 2010.

During the 60 years of occupancy by the Israeli army, the base was served by an army synagogue in one of the halls of the main building, including a Torah ark, bookcase, and a balcony door set with 12 stained-glass windows depicting the Twelve Tribes of Israel.

== Current use ==
In 2008 the army base relocated to the Ofrit base near Mount Scopus. The Jerusalem municipality put together a "preservation and construction plan" for the Schneller compound, calling for the eight historic buildings to be developed for public use by the Orthodox Jewish community nearby. In November 2010, part of the Schneller grounds were designated as a public parking lot by the municipality to ease the parking problems in the neighboring Geula commercial district. One hundred parking spaces were made available for up to three hours.

In 2011 the Israel Land Administration approved plans for the development of 218 luxury apartments on the property while preserving the eight historic orphanage buildings.

As of 2012, parts of the complex are being used for a Bais Yaakov girls' school, a Gerrer Talmud Torah, a training area for urban combat police, and municipal waste storage.

== Successor schools ==
The philosophy and mission of the Schneller Orphanage continued after World War II in two successor schools in the Middle East.

- The Johann Ludwig Schneller School in Khirbat Qanafar, Western Beqaa District, Lebanon, was started in Lebanon in 1948 by Elias al-Haddad and 12 Schneller students, and was established in its present location in 1952 by Hermann Schneller, a grandson of Johann Ludwig Schneller. Like the Schneller Orphanage in Jerusalem, it provides academic and vocational training for impoverished local children. Today the school is owned and operated by the National Evangelical Church of Beirut.
- The Theodor Schneller School was founded in Marka, 10 kilometres (6.2 mi) northwest of Amman, Jordan, in 1959 by Hermann Schneller and graduates of the Schneller Orphanage in Jerusalem. Providing academic and vocational training for 265 orphaned and impoverished boys, it is funded by the Schneller Schools Society in Stuttgart and is under the auspices of the Episcopal Church in Jerusalem. The Marka refugee camp, established nearby in 1968, is often called the "Schneller camp" because of its proximity to this school.

== Sources ==
- Ben-Arieh, Yehoshua (1979). עיר בראי תקופה: ירושלים החדשה בראשיתה [A City Reflected in its Times: New Jerusalem – The Beginnings] (in Hebrew). Jerusalem: Yad Izhak Ben-Zvi Publications.
- Sarah R. Irving (2017). "Intellectual networks, language and knowledge under colonialism: the work of Stephan Stephan, Elias Haddad and Tawfiq Canaan in Palestine, 1909-1948" (PDF). Literatures, Languages and Cultures PhD Thesis Collection. University of Eidenburgh.
- Kark, Ruth; Denecke, Dietrich; Goren, Haim. "The Impact of Early German Missionary Enterprise in Palestine on Modernization and Environmental and Technological Change, 1820-1914," in Christian Witness Between Continuity and New Beginnings: Modern Historical Missions in the Middle East, eds. Martin Tamcke and Michael Martin. Lit Verlag, 2008. ISBN 3-8258-9854-7
- Kark, Ruth; Nordheim, Michael Oren (2001). Jerusalem and Its Environs: Quarters, Neighborhoods, Villages, 1800-1948 (Israel Studies in Historical Geography. Wayne State University Press. ISBN 0-8143-2909-8.
