= Malkhei Yisrael Street =

Street in Jerusalem, Israel

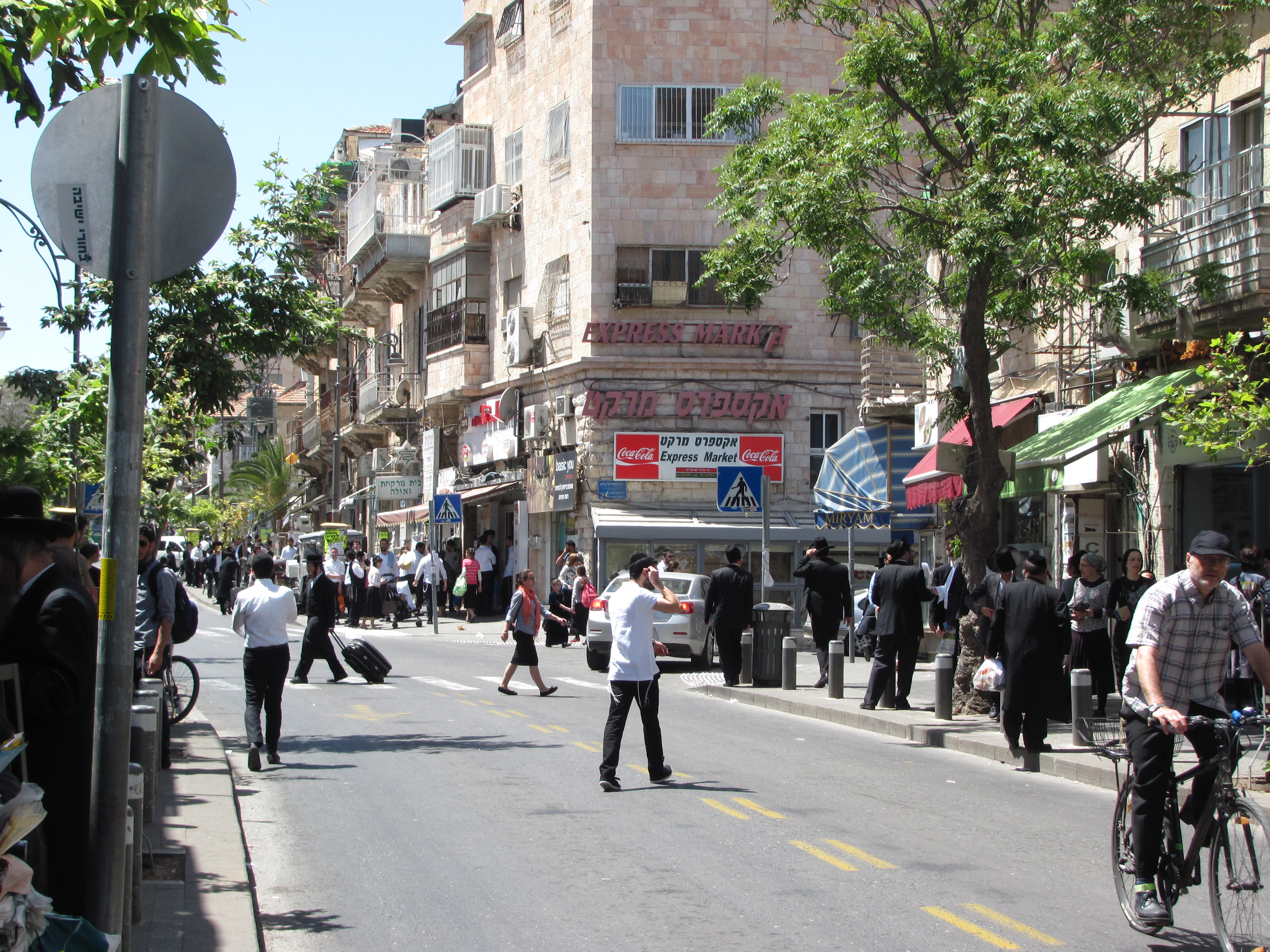
Malkhei Yisrael Street on a busy Friday afternoon

Malkhei Yisrael Street (Hebrew: רחוב מלכי ישראל, Rechov Malkhei Yisrael, lit. "Kings of Israel Street"), also spelled Malchei Yisrael, is an east–west street in the Geula neighborhood of north-central Jerusalem. Its eastern flank, which abuts Mea Shearim Street at an intersection called Kikar HaShabbat (Sabbath Square), is the main shopping district for Haredi Jewish residents of northern Jerusalem. The remainder of the street, which extends to Sarei Yisrael Street at its western end, includes the historic Schneller Compound and numerous Haredi and Hasidic yeshivas, girls' schools, and synagogues.

== Name ==
The street was originally called Geula Street and was the commercial center for various pre-World War I communities such as Kerem Avraham, Yagiya Kapayim, Zikhron Moshe, Batei Horenstein, and the Achva neighborhood.

The name Malkhei Yisrael (Kings of Israel) refers to the three kings of Israel, Saul, David, and Solomon.

== Urban commercial district ==
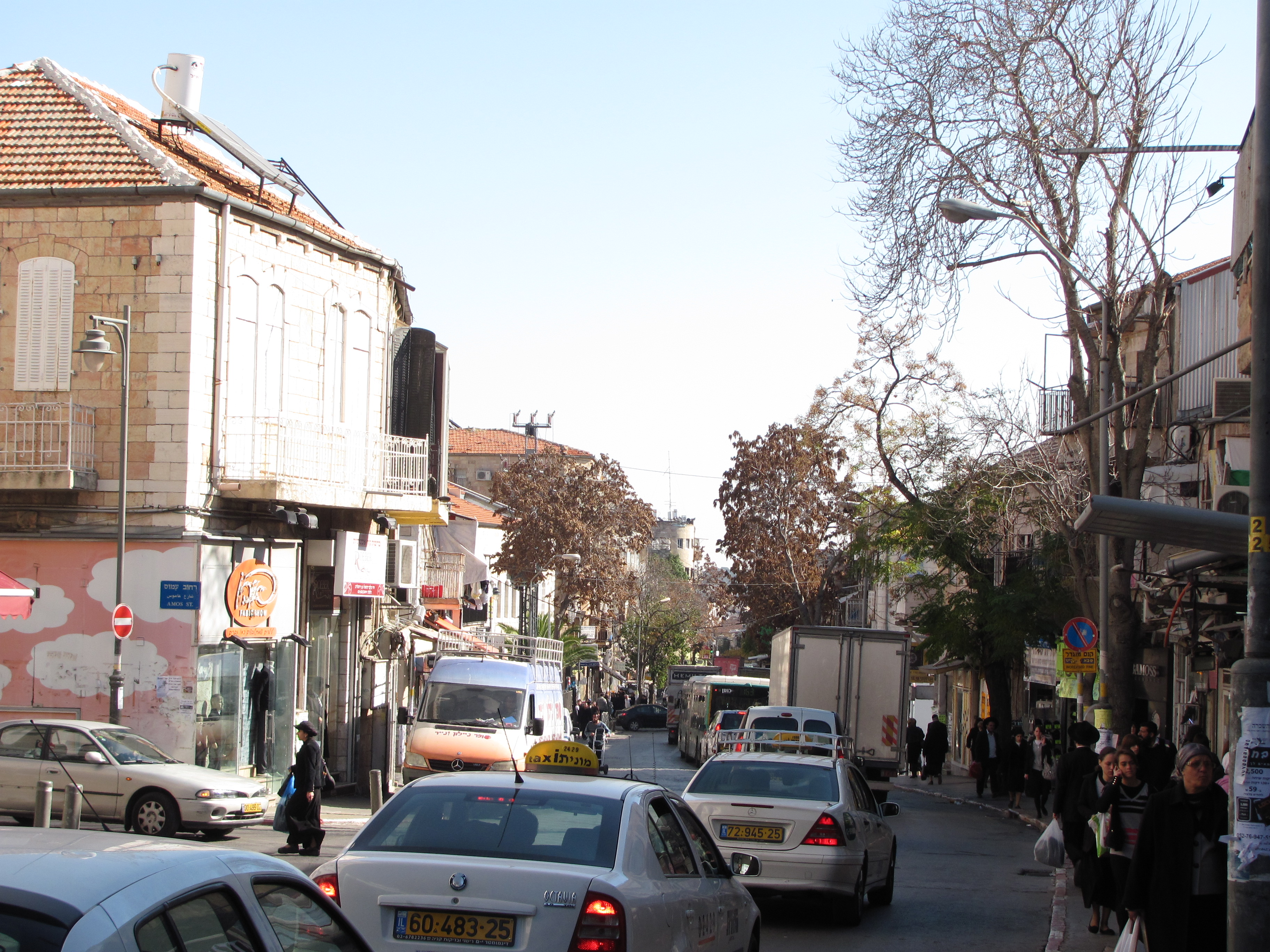
A common view of the congestion in Malkhei Yisrael's commercial district.

The eastern end of Malkhei Yisrael, which is the heart of the Haredi commercial district for northern Jerusalem, has been called "the ultra-Orthodox Oxford Street". Spanning approximately 300 metres (980 ft), and branching out into the side streets, this area is noteworthy for its huge volume of foot traffic and the high cost of commercial space – rent per square meter is equal to or greater than that of commercial space in Israel's major malls. Many stores are open from 10 a.m. to 11 p.m., and the street is especially crowded on Thursday nights, summer nights, and the eve of Jewish holidays. Traffic on the two-lane street often comes to a standstill throughout the day, as in addition to cars and delivery trucks, bus lines serving northern Haredi neighborhoods and Rachel's Tomb ply the street. The weekday hubbub only ceases on Friday afternoon before the advent of Shabbat, while on Friday nights, Malkhei Yisrael and neighboring streets are filled with Hasidic Jews and tourists walking on foot to the various Hasidic courts in and around Geula.

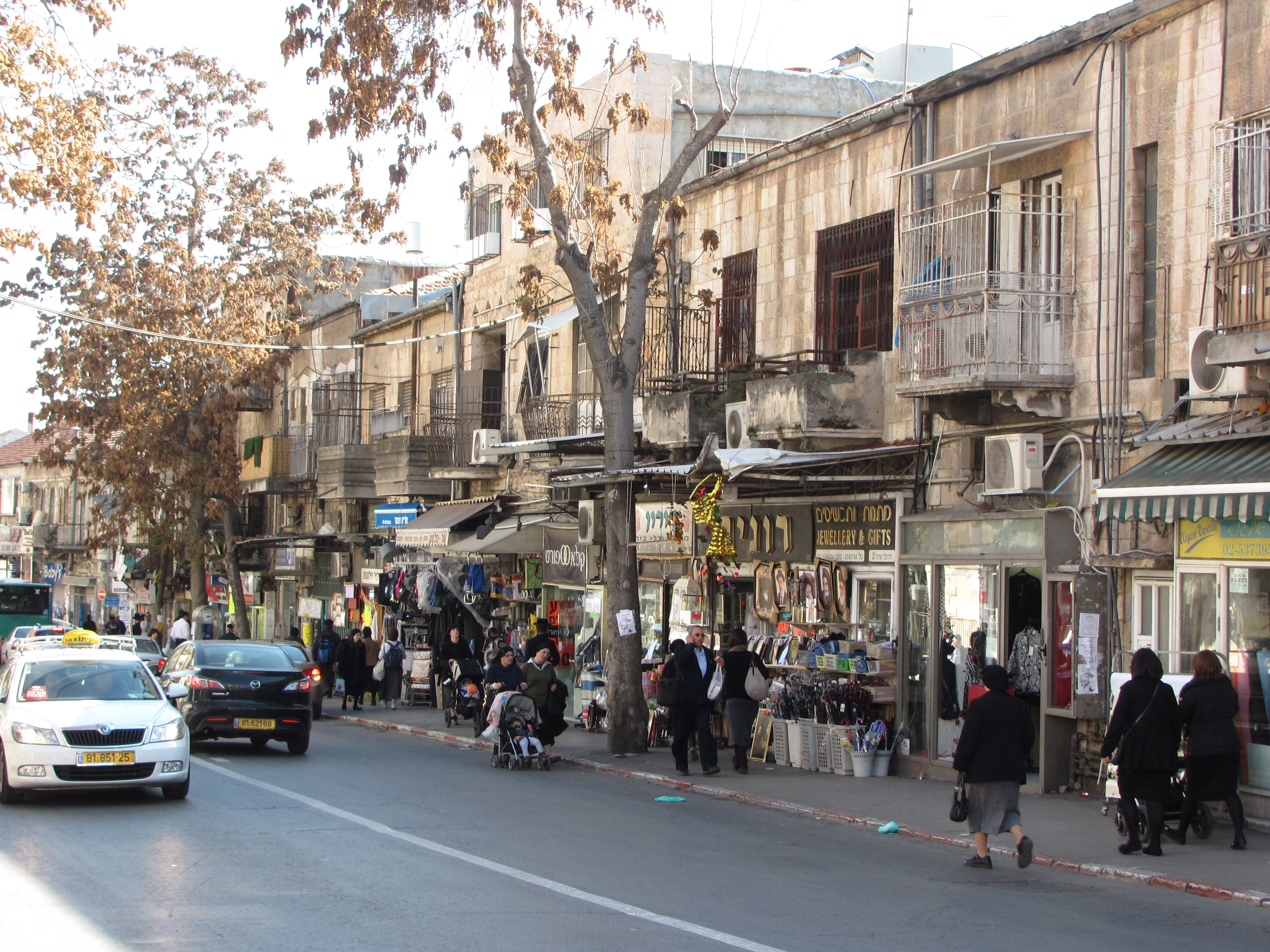
Morning shoppers pass the stores on Malkhei Yisrael Street.

There are no indoor malls on this street; rather, the avenue is lined with dozens of small shops that sell essential consumer goods such as "clothes, food, school supplies, medicine, and limited luxuries" to the Haredi community. There are kosher music stores, kosher pizza shops, home appliance stores, falafel and juice stands, a kosher ice cream parlor, pharmacies, photo shops, a teenage novelty store, Judaica sellers, kosher bakeries, and a shtiebel with continuous minyanim. All food stores carry reliable hechsherim (kashrut certificates) to appeal to the Haredi clientele, which often shops with children in tow. In the weeks before Sukkot, numerous stores vacate their premises and rent their space to etrog dealers, while sidewalk vendors sell etrogs, lulavs, sukkah decorations and pictures of rabbinical figures. As a central Haredi shopping district for both locals and tourists, Malkhei Yisrael Street is also populated by a number of street beggars, some of whom have been working the street for decades.

== Schneller Compound ==
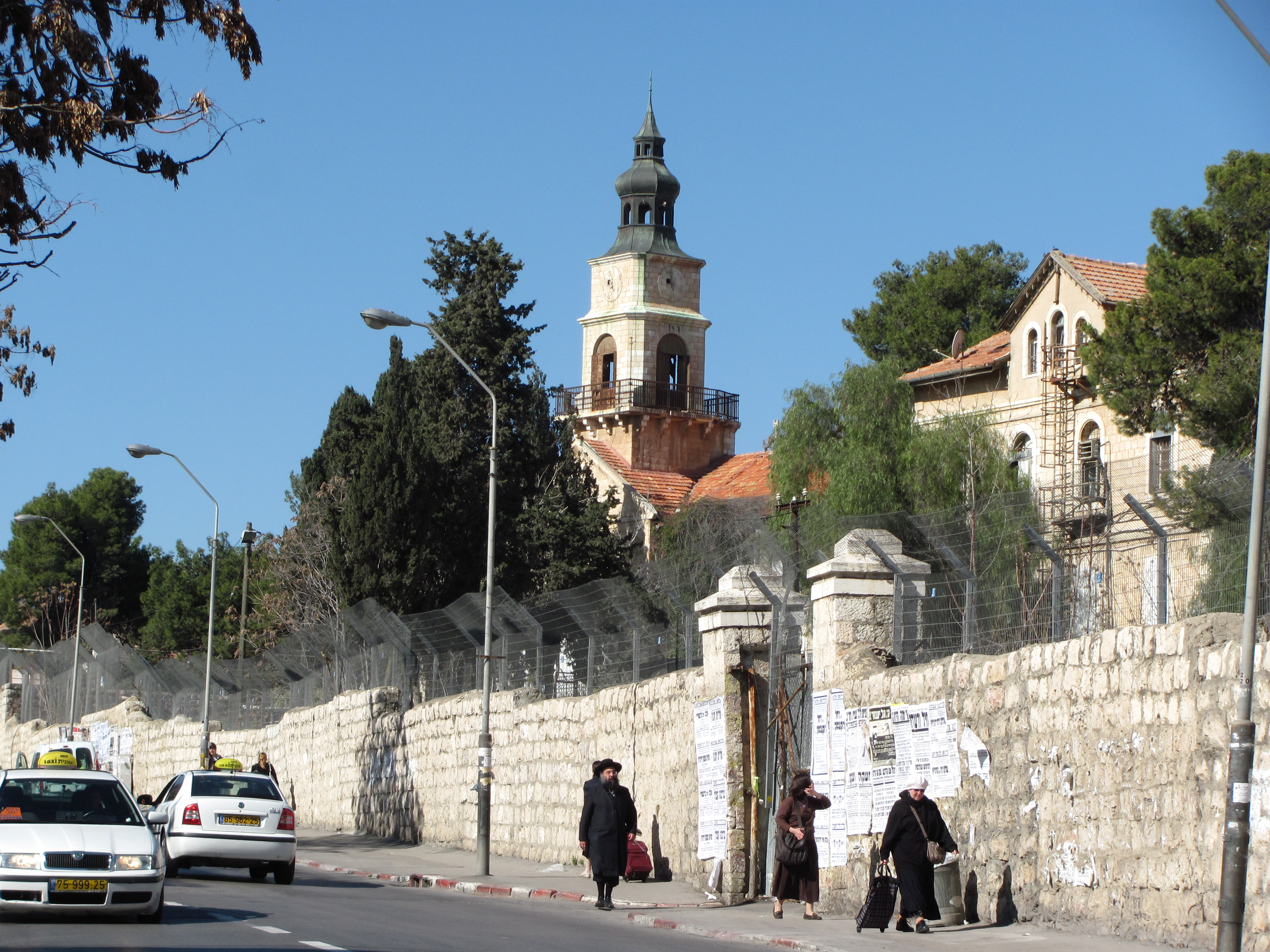
View of the Schneller Compound from Malkhei Yisrael Street.

The Schneller Compound, located along the center section of Malkhei Yisrael Street behind a long stone wall, predates all of the streets and neighborhoods surrounding it. The land was purchased in 1855 by Father Johann Ludwig Schneller, a Lutheran missionary, as a family estate. Following an 1860 massacre of thousands of Maronite Christians in Lebanon and Syria by Lebanese Druze, Schneller rescued nine Christian boys and established an orphanage on his property. By the time of Schneller's death on 18 October 1896, 1500 children had passed through the orphanage's doors. By 1903 this educational facility had grown to eight buildings and included an orphanage, a school for the blind, and vocational workshops for youth. The compound was taken over by the Turkish army as an army barracks during World War I, by the British during World War II, and by the Haganah during the 1948 Arab-Israeli War. After that, it was used as a base for the Israel Defense Forces and an army clinic for 60 years. In 2008 the army base was relocated to the Ofrit base near Mount Scopus.

In November 2010, the Schneller grounds were designated as a public parking lot by the municipality to ease the parking problems in Geula. One hundred parking spaces were made available for up to 3 hours.

In 2011 the Israel Land Administration approved plans for the development of 218 luxury apartments on the property while preserving the eight original orphanage buildings.

== Geological Survey of Israel ==
The Geological Survey of Israel has operated next to the Schneller Compound since 1949. This government institute is involved in earth science research and development.

== Present-day landmarks ==
=== Schools ===
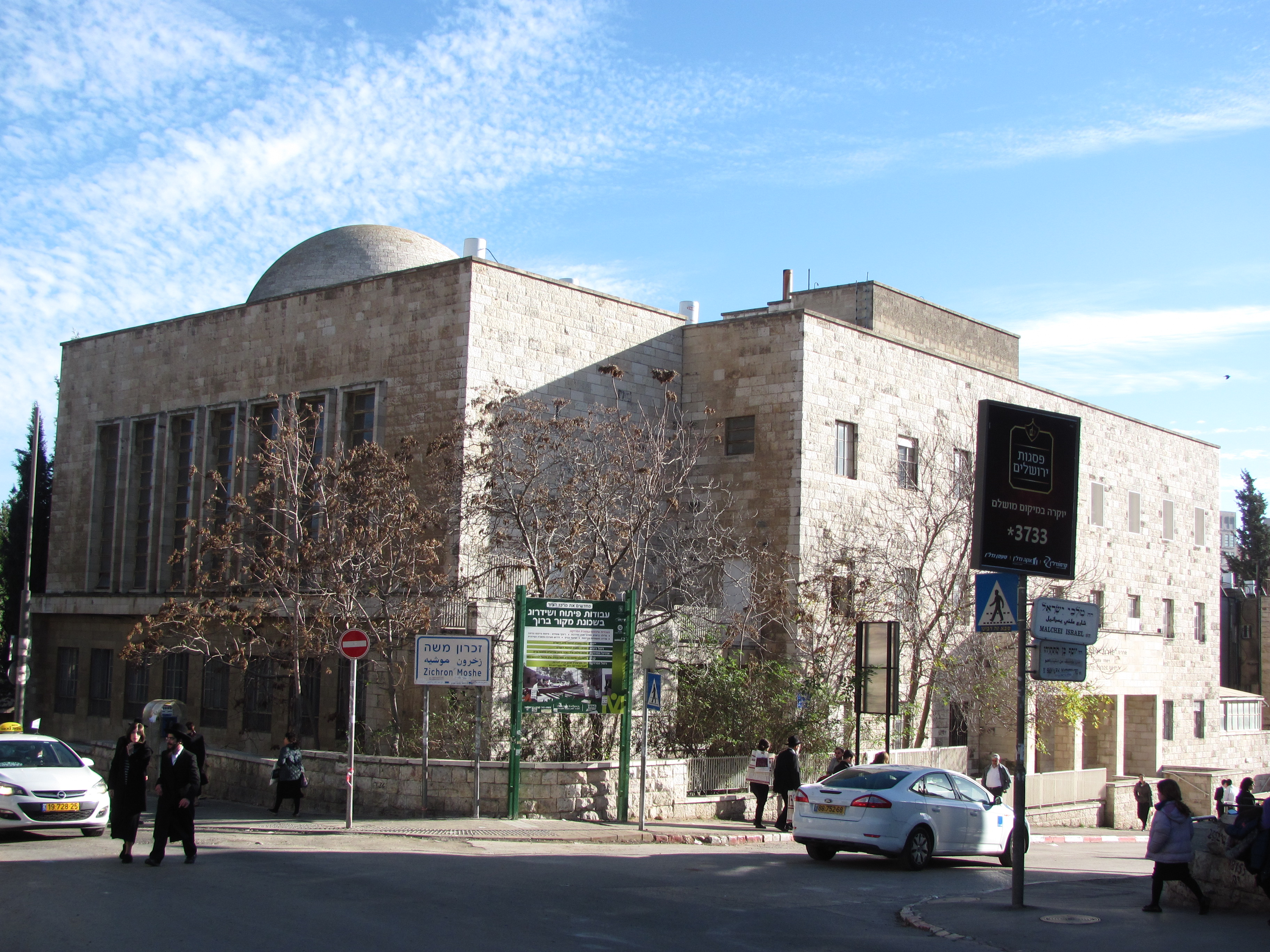
Geula branch of Porat Yosef Yeshiva

- Bais Yaakov Teachers Training Seminary
- Midreshet Rachel Women's Seminary

=== Yeshivas ===
- Ateret Yitzchak yeshiva gedola
- Be'er HaTalmud yeshiva
- Brisk yeshiva
- Chayei Olam yeshiva
- Porat Yosef Yeshiva
- Talmud Torah Mesilat Yesharim
- Tiferet Yisrael yeshiva
- Yakirei Yisrael yeshiva

=== Synagogues ===
- Gerrer Great Beis Medrash
- Tiferet Yisrael Great Synagogue

== Other uses ==
Malkhei Yisrael Square is the former name of Rabin Square in Tel Aviv.
