= Geula =

Neighbourhood of central Jerusalem

Coordinates: 31.78°N 35.21°E

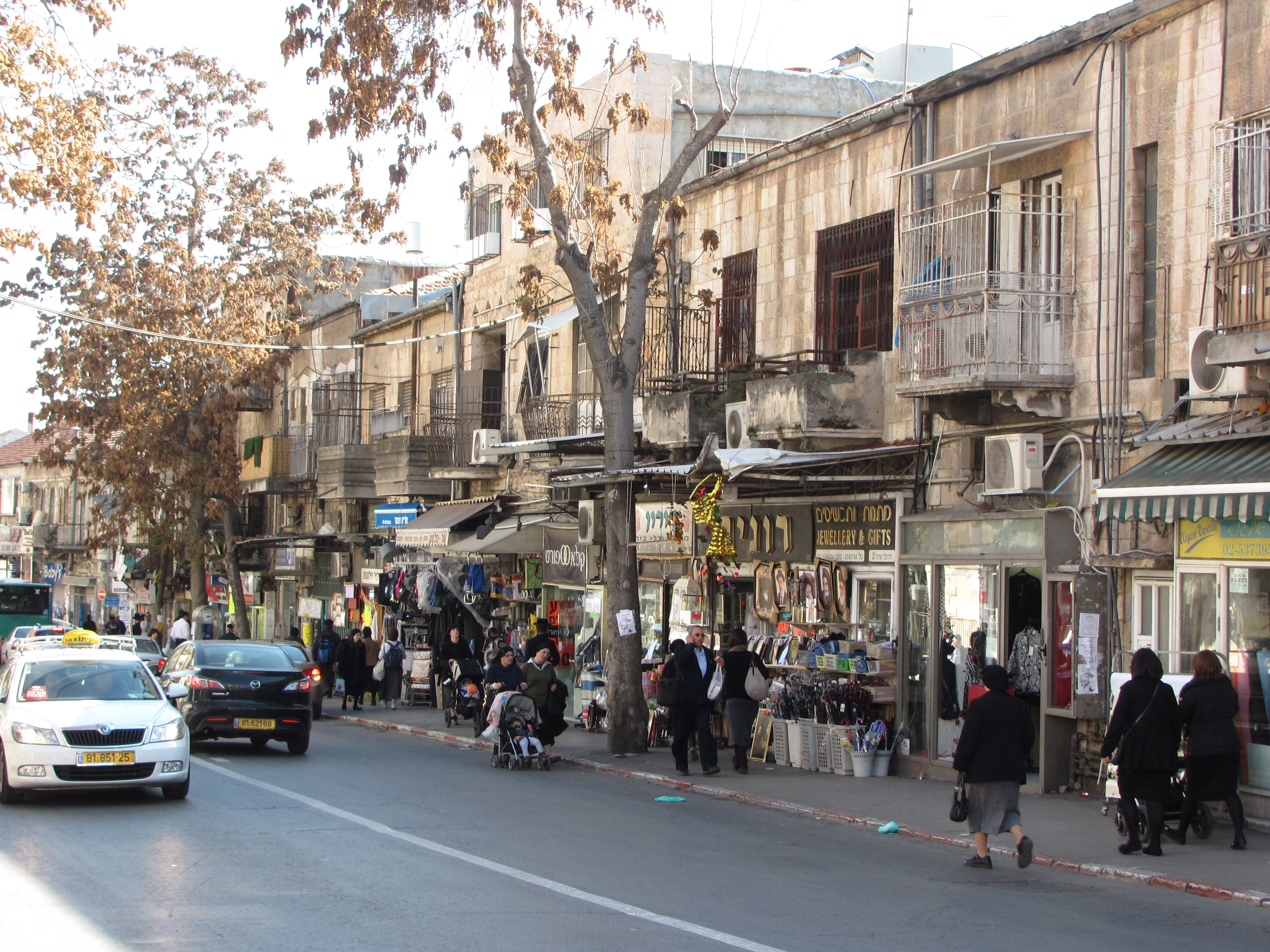
Malkhei Yisrael Street

Geula (Hebrew: גאולה lit. Redemption) is a neighborhood in the center of Jerusalem, populated mainly by Haredi Jews. Geula is bordered by Zikhron Moshe and Mekor Baruch on the west, the Bukharim neighborhood on the north, Mea Shearim on the east and the Jerusalem city center on the south.

== History ==
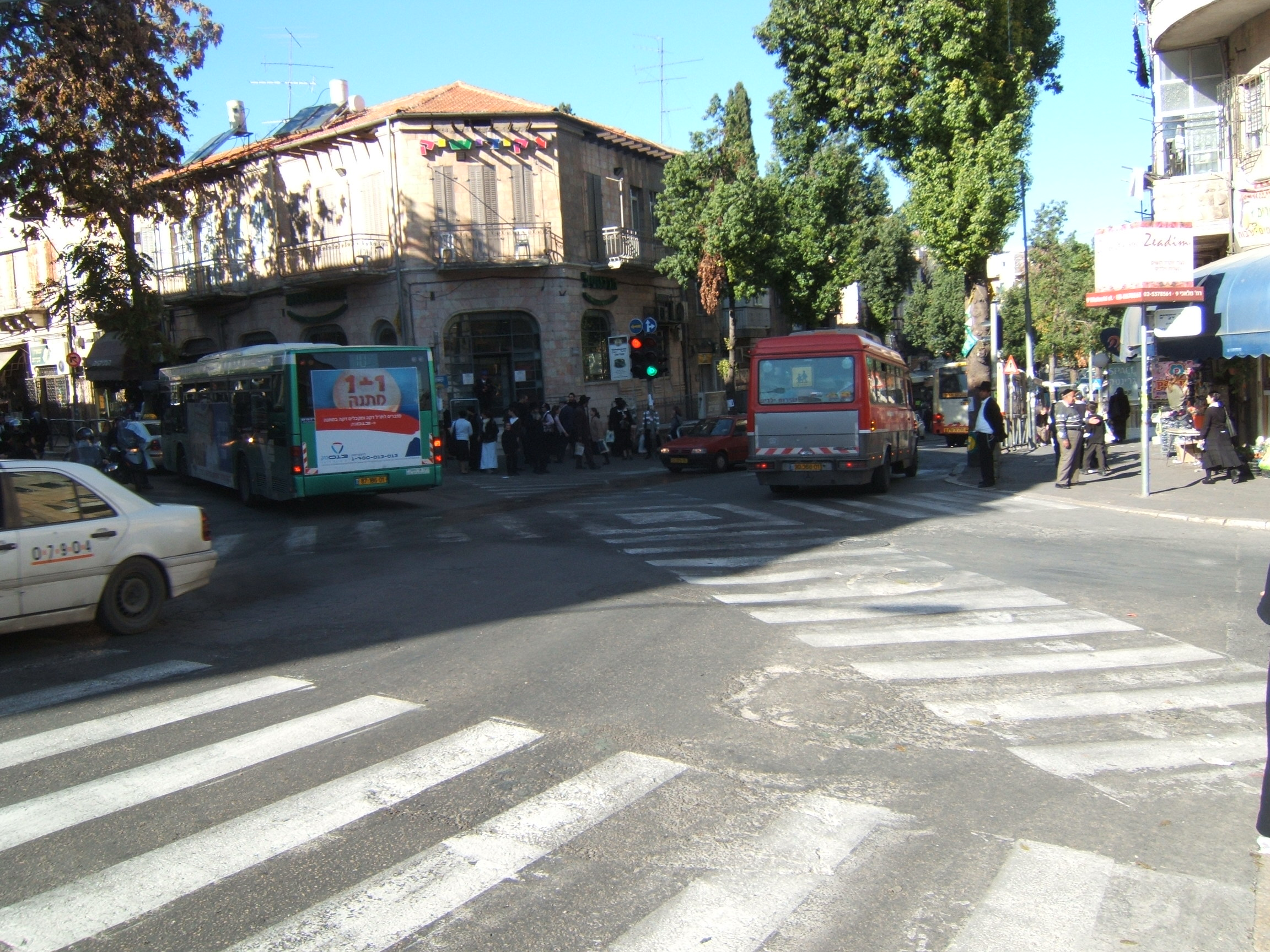
Kikar HaShabbat, Geula's main intersection

Geula was established in 1927–28. It was originally a mixed neighborhood of secular and religious Jews. The British consul to Jerusalem, James Finn, built his home in the area in 1855, employing Jewish labor. It was the third building constructed outside the walls of the Old City.

Geula was developed by banker Avraham Chasidoff (founder of Israel Discount Bank) who named the main street after his eldest daughter, Geula.Interview with Geula

Geula was named for the neighborhood's main street, Geula Street, now Malkhei Yisrael Street. Geula Street was the commercial center for various local communities such as Kerem Avraham, Yagiya Kapayim, Zikhron Moshe, Batei Horenstein, and the Achva neighborhood. Today these communities are collectively known as the Geula neighborhood. Malkhei Yisrael Street is lined with dozens of small shops. The neighborhood is home to many yeshivas and synagogues.

== Landmarks ==
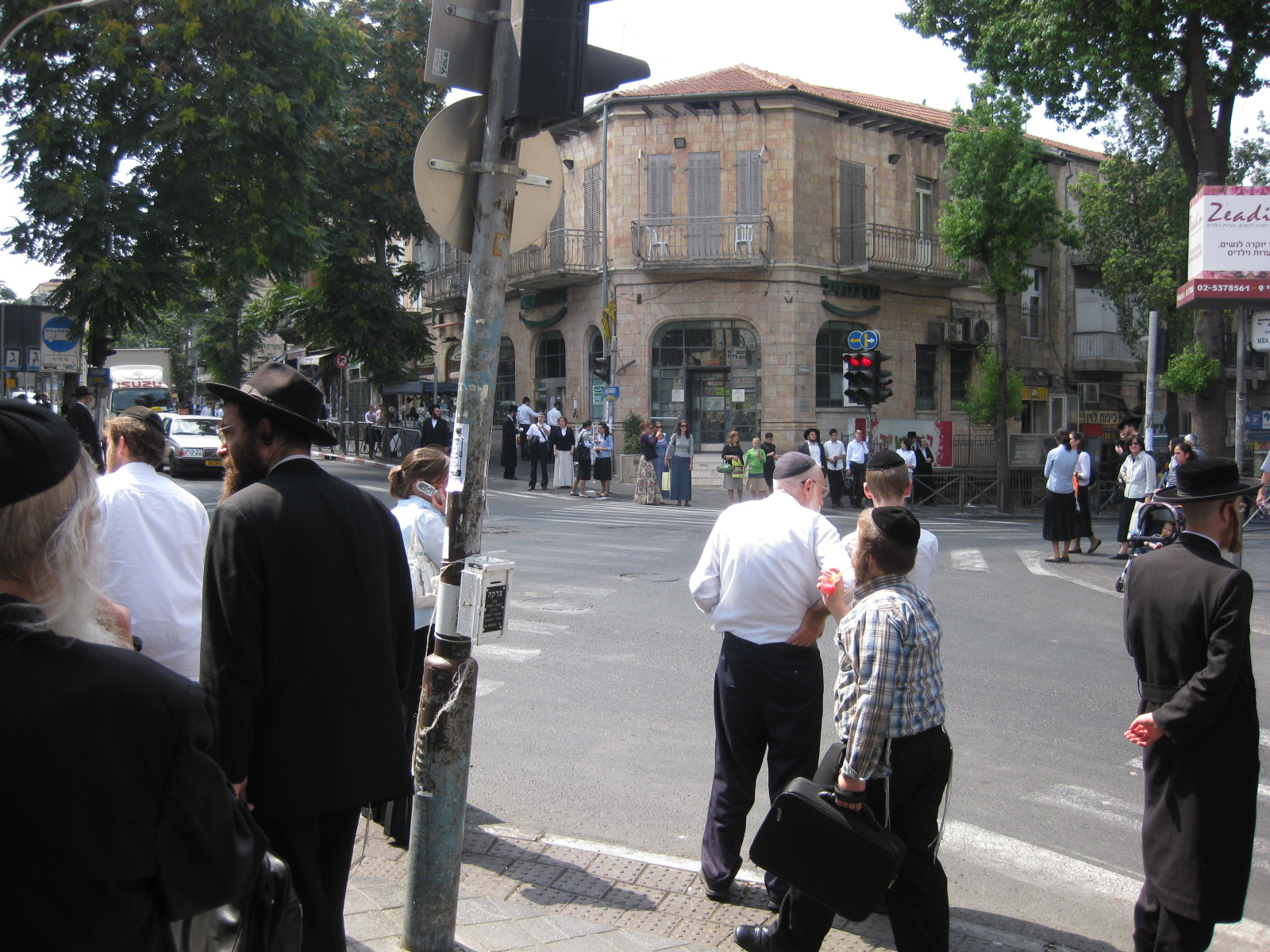
Kikar HaShabbat

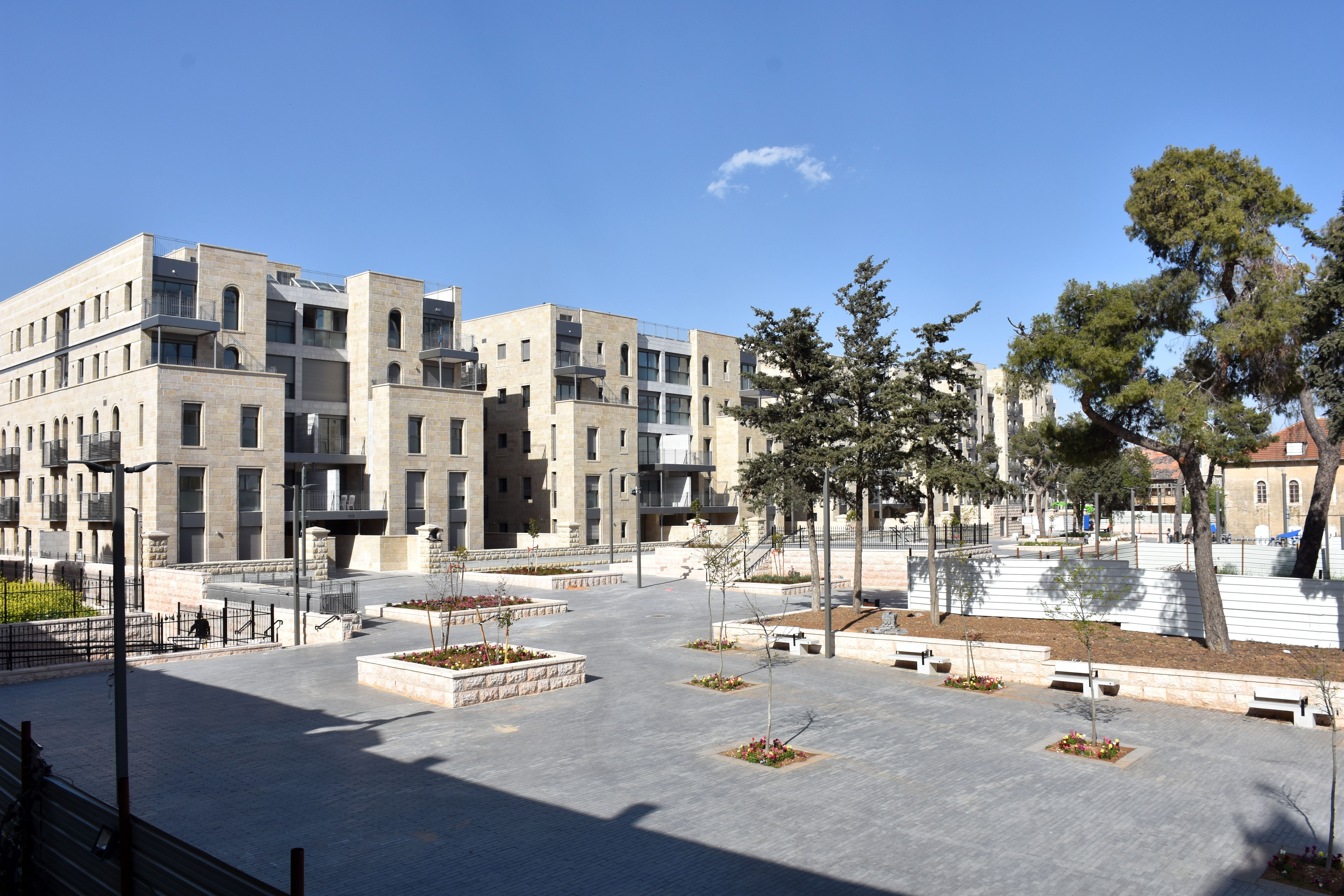
New housing project in what was once Camp Schneller

Kikar HaShabbat is the main intersection. The Zion Blumenthal Orphanage, founded in 1900, and Camp Schneller – formerly the Schneller Orphanage, founded in 1860 – became part of Geula as the neighborhood expanded. The Gur yeshiva, with a beit midrash of 10,000 seats, is also in Geula. The neighborhood is also home to Kretshme, Jerusalem's first Haredi bar.

== Notable residents ==
- Ada Yonath
