= Cremisan Valley =

Coordinates: 31°43′37″N 35°10′21″E

The Cremisan Valley is a valley located in Palestine on the Seam Zone between the West Bank and Jerusalem.

The valley is one of the last green areas in the Bethlehem district, with vast stretches of agricultural lands and recreational grounds. The Salesian Sisters Convent and School, the Salesian Monastery and Cremisan Cellars are located in the valley.

== Salesian Sisters Convent and School ==
The main convent and monastery are part of the Salesian order, founded by Don Bosco. The convent and school were opened in 1960 and have around 400 students in their primary school, kindergarten, as well as the school for children with learning disabilities. The school also hosts a number of community activities in the afternoons and summer camps.

== Cremisan Monastery ==
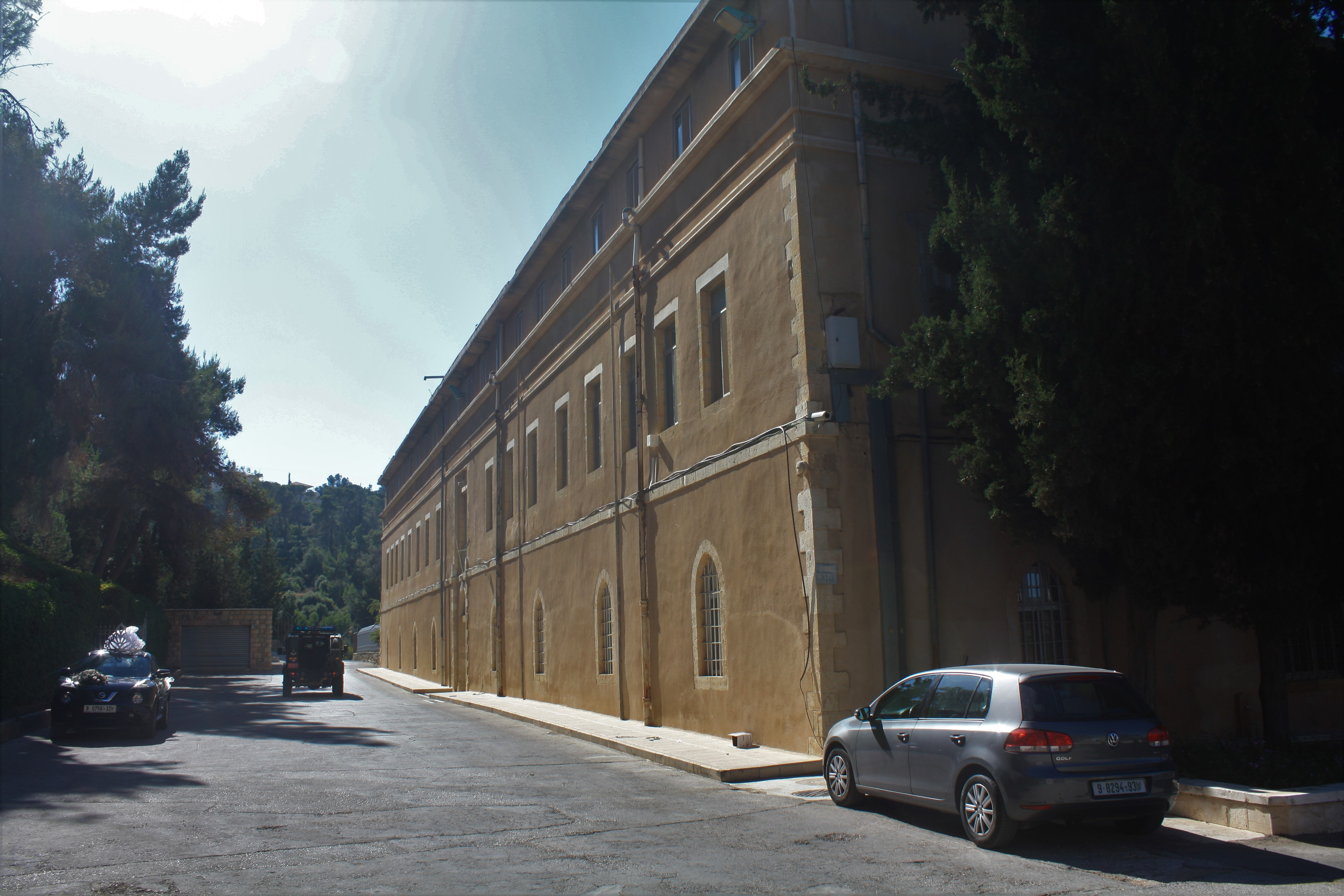
Inside the monastery

The monastery, located on a hill 850 meters above sea level, is five kilometers from Bethlehem. It was built in 1885 on ruins of a 7th century Byzantine monastery. The main monastery, housed in a building featuring stone floors, thick walls and high arched ceilings, is decorated with pictures of Pope John Paul II and Don Bosco.

It is within Jerusalem municipal limits, while the storeroom on the other side of the parking lot is in the West Bank. The road to the monastery passes one of the coordinating offices between Israel and the Palestinian Authority.

== Cremisan Cellars ==
Cremisan Cellars logo

Cremisan Cellars is a winery in operation since the establishment of the monastery in the 19th century. Modern equipment was introduced in 1977. The winery is run by the Salesians of St. John Bosco. The grapes are primarily harvested from the al-Khader area. Only 2% of the wine production (around 700,000 litres per year) is made from Cremisan's own grapes. The rest comes mainly from Beit Jala, Beit Shemesh, and the Hebron area.

== Land appropriation ==
In 2006 the Israeli military authorities issued an order envisaging the creation of a separation barrier which would have confiscated some 3,000 dunams of private local farming terrain and also Catholic church property by enclosing both parts of Beit Jala, and the settlement of Gilo within its precincts, while breaking up the contiguity of the two Salesian monasteries in the valley. The barrier would have divided the 19th Century Salesian monastery, relocated on the Jerusalem side from the neighbouring convent and primary school run by nuns. On April 24, 2013, the Special Appeals Committee of the Tel Aviv Magistrate's Court approved land expropriation for the proposed security barrier along a route that would have annexed about 75 percent of the convent's property and enclose it on three sides. The wall would also annex the farmland of 58 Palestinian families. Israel military authorities argued that construction of the wall was a necessary measure, or "matter of expediency," designed to thwart future attacks by would-be terrorists infiltrating into Israeli towns and settlements.

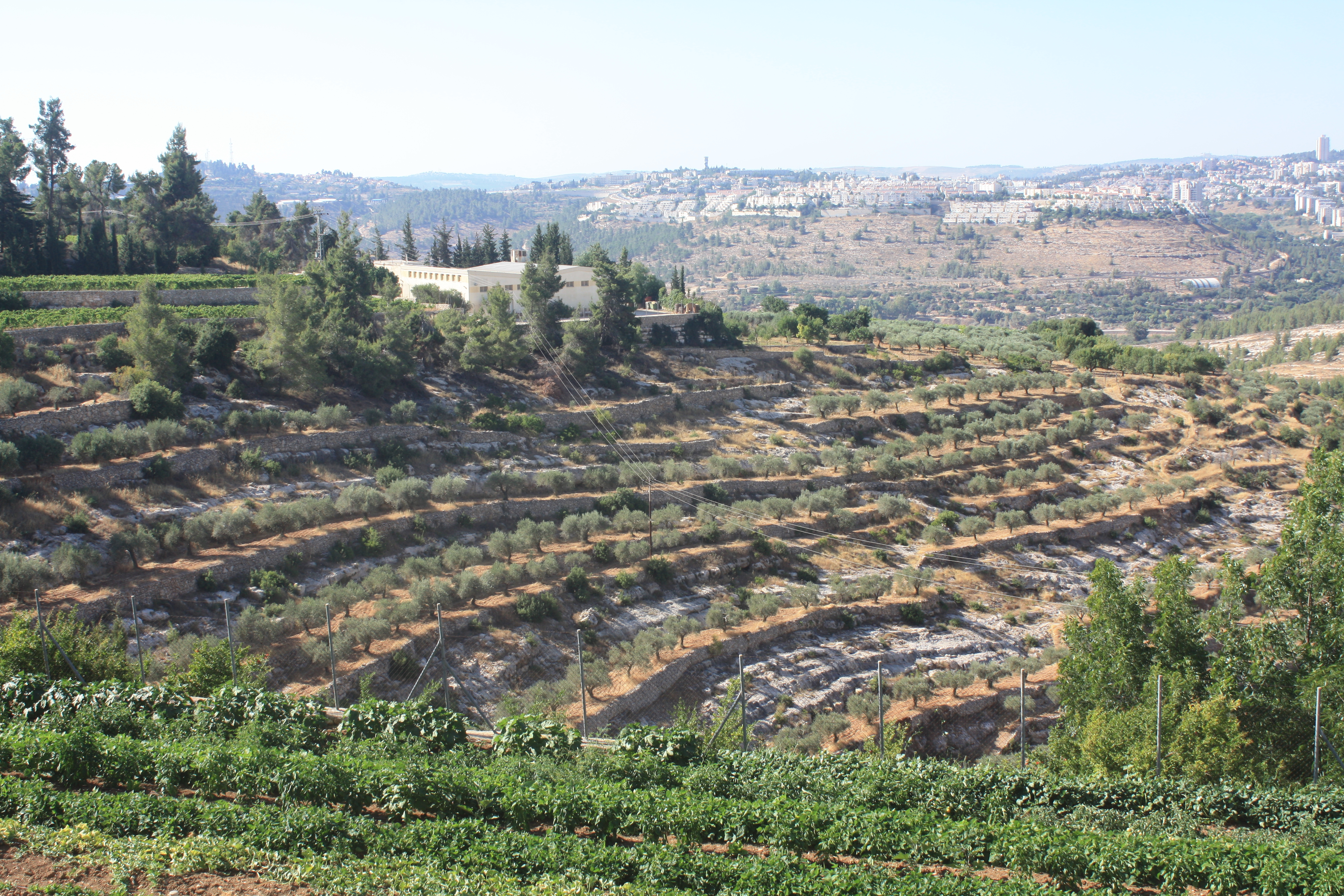
Olive groves and vineyards in the Cremisan Valley near the monastery

2012 proposals for the barrier show it looping around the convent, keeping it on the Palestinian side, but splitting it from the neighbouring monastery, which would be on the Israeli side. The elementary children would still be allowed to attend the school, passing soldiers at an Israeli checkpoint. Landowners would be given limited access via an agricultural gate.

According to the human rights group B'Tselem, 85 percent of the route falls inside the West Bank instead of following the Green Line. Residents of Beit Jala believe the route was chosen to connect the West Bank Israeli settlement of Har Gilo to nearby Gilo.

In a May 6, 2013 letter to U.S. Secretary of State John Kerry, Bishop Richard Pates, the chairman of the bishops' Committee on International Justice and Peace for the United States Conference of Catholic Bishops wrote, "The Cremisan Valley is a microcosm of a protracted pattern that has serious implications for the ongoing Israeli-Palestinian conflict...As the wall moves and constricts more communities in the West Bank, the possibility of a future two-state resolution becomes less likely. Moving the wall and disassociating Palestinian families from their lands and livelihoods will incite more resentment against the State of Israel among residents of the West Bank, not less, increasing the frustrations that can lead to violence."

During the Second Intifada of 2000 there were regular shootings from Beit Jala to Gilo. Israeli Defence Ministry spokesman Joshua Hantman said "The route of the security barrier is based on the specific security considerations of the area. In the Beit Jala region, it is there solely to keep terror out of Jerusalem." Palestinians interpreted the project as a land grab to gain more territory on the West Bank. During the Intifada, a wall was built around Gilo to protect the settlers, but was mostly removed, leaving only 80 of the original 800 plates in place, in August 2010. Israeli Lieutenant-General Hezi Revivo said, "The security situation in the area is better than it was in the period before the wall was built. It was constructed as a response to the attacks during Operation Defensive Shield and today I see no problem with removing it."

Fouad Twal, Latin Patriarch of Jerusalem said in 2013, "We remind Israeli decision-makers that the expropriation of lands does not serve the cause of peace and does not strengthen the position of the moderates." The 9 year legal battle waged by the two local monasteries and the 58 Palestinian landowners in Beit Jala ended when the Israeli Supreme Court ruled in favour of the petitioners in April 2015. The monastery and convent, it determined, ought to remain connected on the Palestinian side of the separation barrier. It was the second such decision in favour of maintaining the integrity of an area on the West Bank, following the Supreme Court's decision in favour of the villagers of Battir, who had petitioned to stop the separation wall from breaking up their traditional lands.

== Terror attack ==
On October 22, 1984, two Israeli students, Ron Levi and Revital Seri, were murdered beside the Cremisan monastery by a Palestinian from Deheishe, Issa Abd Rabbo. A week later an Israeli soldier, David Ben-Shimol, stole and shot a LAW rocket at a Palestinian bus as an unauthorized retaliation, killing one and injuring 10 Palestinians.
