= Al-Hussein Governmental Hospital, Beit Jala =

Hospistal in Beit Jala, Bethlehem, West Bank, Palestine

Coordinates: 31.7110845°N 35.1974711°E

Beit Jala Governmental Hospital (Al-Hussein)
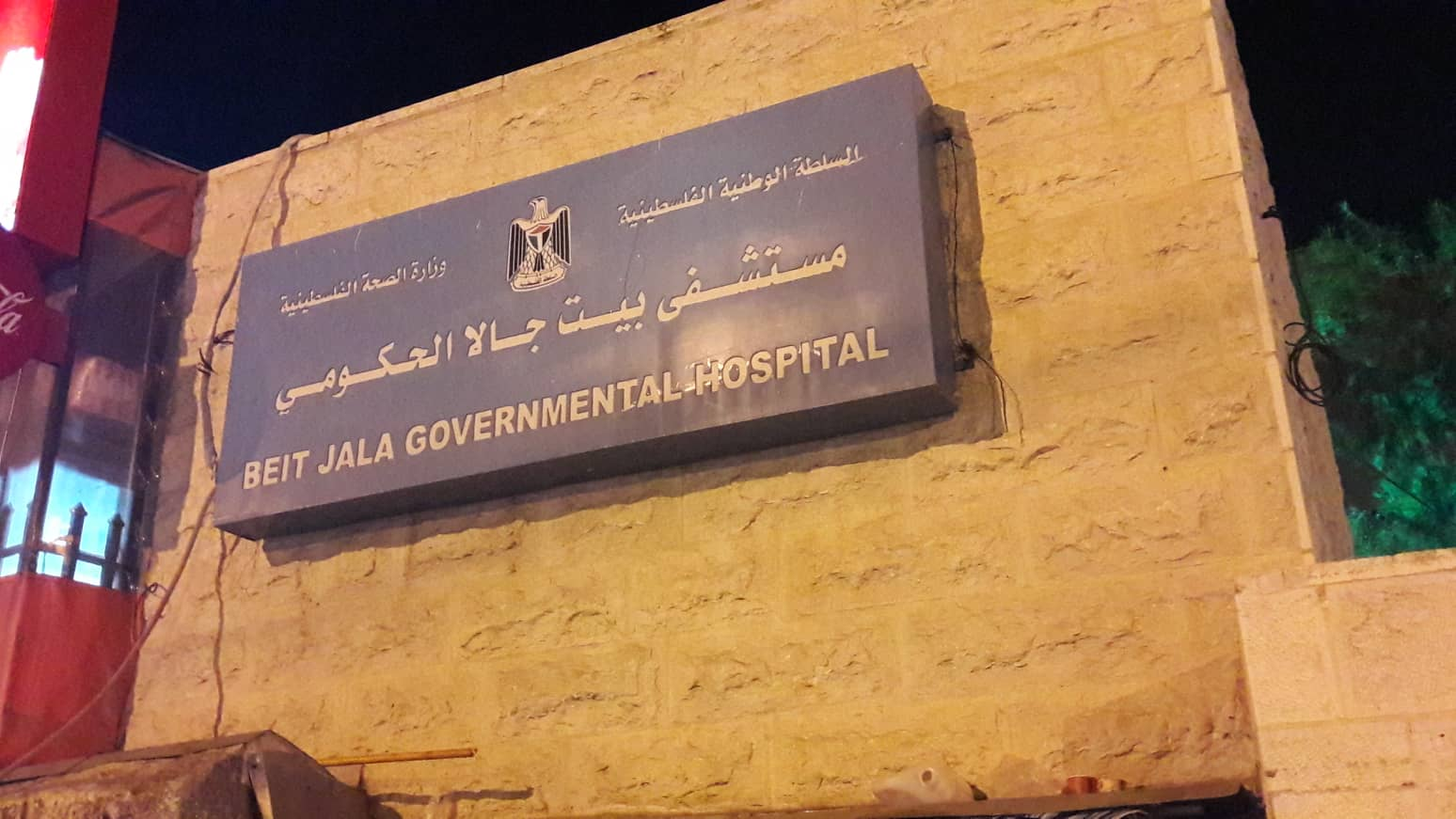

Geography
- Location: Beit Jala city, Bethlehem Governorate, West Bank, State of Palestine

Organisation
- Type: District General

Services
- Emergency department: Yes
- Beds: 131

History
- Founded: 1955

Beit Jala Governmental Hospital or Al-Hussein Governmental Hospital is a government hospital in the Beit Jala city, West Bank, Palestine. Followed by the Palestinian Ministry of Health. It was built in 1955 and has 131 beds. It employs 363 staff, including a doctor, nurse, pharmacist, physiotherapist, laboratory technician, radiologist and others.
