= Bcheale =

Village in Batroun District, Lebanon

Bchaaleh بشعله
- Village
- Location within Lebanon
- Coordinates: 34°12′13″N 35°49′25″E
- Country: Lebanon
- Governorate: North Governorate
- District: Batroun District
- Elevation: 1,311 m (4,301 ft)

Population (2020)
  - Total: 2,800 registered voters 1,800 residents
- Time zone: UTC+2 (EET)
  - Summer (DST): UTC+3 (EEST)
- Dialing code: +9616715
- Website: www.bchaaleh.com

Bchaaleh (Arabic: بشعله), alternatively spelled Bcheale, Bchealeh or Bshaaleh, is a village in the Batroun District of the North Governorate in Lebanon.

It had 1,456 eligible voters in the 2009 elections, and the residents mainly belonged to the Maronite Church. The village is notable for being home for the Sisters Olive Trees of Noah, twelve olive trees believed to be among the world's oldest.

== Geography ==
The village of Bchaaleh stands on a promontory, with views of the sea and across Douma. It is home to traditional houses and to Saint Stephan church, one of the largest in the region of Batroun. To the north-east of the village, a citadel is built on the ruins of a medieval fortress, erected itself on Phoenicians ruins destroyed by the Romans.

=== Centennial olive trees ===
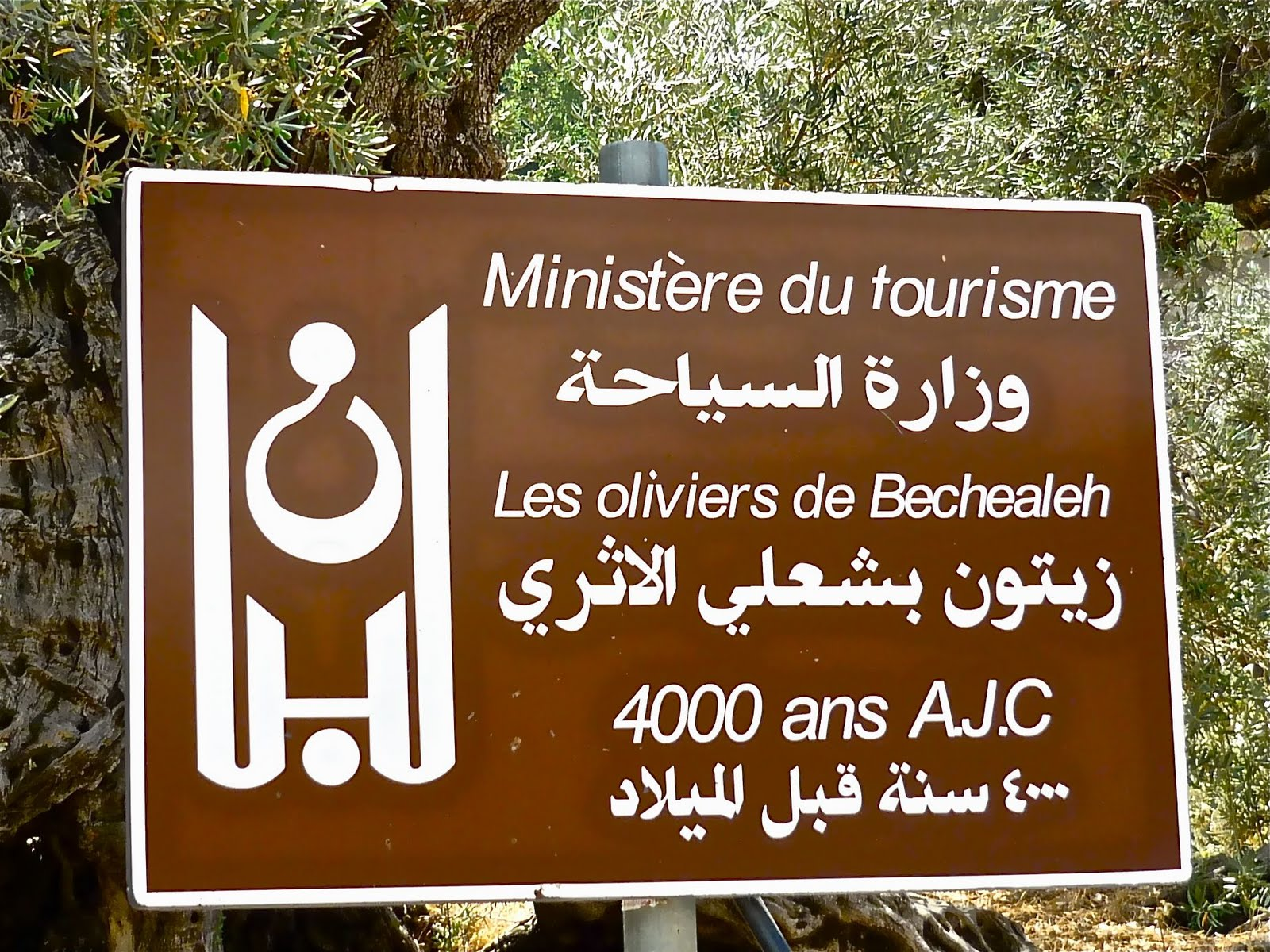
Commemorative plaque given to the village of Bchaaleh on the occasion of the dating of the village's olive trees in 1999

Twelve olive trees still live in the village of Bchaaleh, at more than 1200m above sea level. It is said that they are the oldest olive trees in the world. Different studies and research present data on the age of the Sisters Olive Trees of Noah in Bchaaleh. Some claim they are "between five and seven thousand years old".

== Etymology ==
Syriac origin, "Beit Chaali", meaning "the place of glorification and adoration".

== Demographics ==
In 2014 Christians made up 99.14% of registered voters in Bchaaleh. 93.70% of the voters were Maronite Catholics.

== Solar power ==
In 2017 Bchaaleh installed a solar farm, and managed to avoid the worst effects of the 2021 Lebanese blackout.

== See also ==
- List of oldest trees
- List of individual trees
- List of long-living organisms
