= Beit Jala =

Town near Bethlehem, State of Palestine

Beit Jala بيت جالا (Arabic)
- Municipality type B

Arabic transcription(s)
  - Arabic: بيت جالا
  - Latin: Bayt Jala (unofficial)
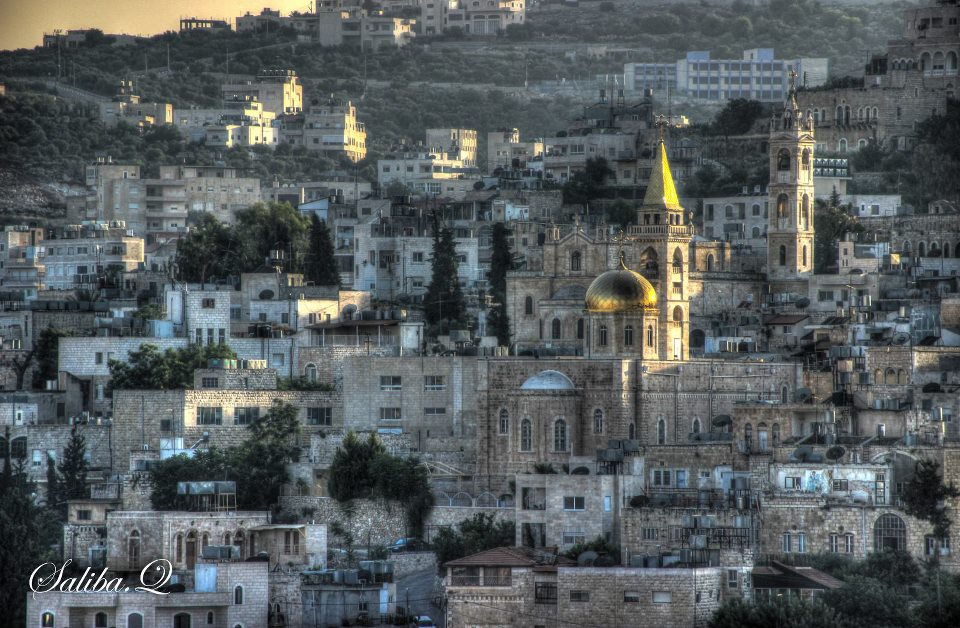
- Beit Jala, with Saint Nicholas Church.

- Municipal Seal of Beit Jala

- Location of Beit Jala within Palestine
- Coordinates: 31°42′54″N 35°11′14″E
- Palestine grid: 167/124
- State: State of Palestine
- Governorate: Bethlehem

Government
  - Type: Municipality
  - Head of Municipality: Nicola Khamis

Area
  - Municipality type B: 13.0 km^{2} (5.0 sq mi)

Population (2017)
  - Municipality type B: 13,484
  - Density: 1,040/km^{2} (2,690/sq mi)
  - Metro: 97,559
- Name meaning: House of Jala
- Website: www.beitjala-city.org/en/

Beit Jala (Arabic: بيت جالا) is a Palestinian Christian town in the Bethlehem Governorate of Palestine, in the West Bank. Beit Jala is located 10 km (6.2 mi)10 km south of Jerusalem, on the western side of the Hebron road, opposite Bethlehem, at 825 meters (2,707 ft) altitude. In 2017, Beit Jala had 13,484 inhabitants according to the Palestinian Central Bureau of Statistics. About 80% of the population were Christians (mostly Greek Orthodox and Roman Catholic) and about 20% Muslims.

Saint Nicholas – the inspiration for Santa Claus – is the patron saint of Beit Jala, where the Church of Saint Nicholas was built over a crypt where it is believed he lived for a couple years during his time in Palestine.

== Etymology ==
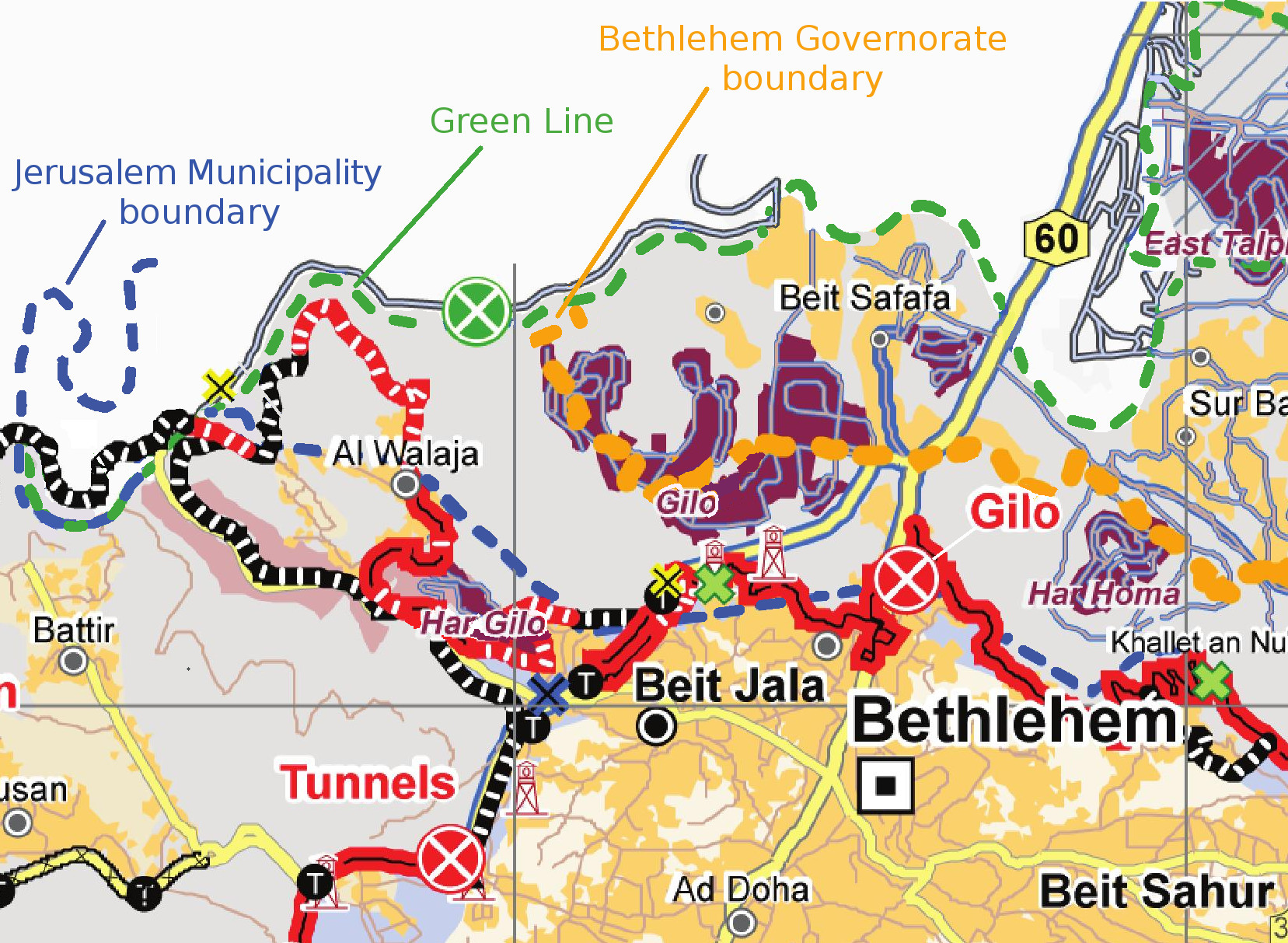
Map of the Beit Jala region

Conder and Kitchener identified Beit Jala with Galem or Gallim (Γαλλιμ) of the Septuagint, a place in the 9th district of the inheritance of Judah; homonymous with a settlement in Benjamin NE of Jerusalem.

== History ==
=== Byzantine period ===
A crypt, dating to the 5th or 6th century C.E., was located under the Church of Saint Nicholas in Beit Jala.

=== Crusader period ===
In the Crusader era, the village was called Apezala, and the Church of Saint Nicholas was possibly rebuilt during that time.

=== Ottoman period ===
In 1516, the village was included in the Ottoman Empire with the rest of Palestine. In this century, Beit Jala was a large village of Christian and peasants and it had over ten elders (akabir) who functioned as leaders, with each religious group having separate sets of leaders. Rare for a single village, it and nearby Bethlehem, served as its own separate jurisdiction instead of being grouped with other villages into a nahiya. In April 1531, when an Ottoman official went to Beit Jala to register the village's grapevines for tax purposes, the residents refused to seriously answer his questions and mocked the authority of the Ottoman sultan, marking a notable episode of initial local resistance to the Ottoman taxation methods and procedures. By the end of the 16th century, Beit Jala was almost entirely inhabited by Christians. Beit Jala's size rendered it similar to that of a town, with the village being subdivided into four quarters. The village produced more wheat and barley than surrounding localities and like other villages south of Jerusalem, grape cultivation was greater than olive cultivation. Beit Jala was taxed on these agricultural products as well as figs, honeybees, and goats. It contained one of the six olive presses in the subdistrict of Jerusalem in the 16th century. Despite its large size, Beit Jala was relatively poorer than other villages in the subdistrict.

In the 1596 tax-records, it appeared as Bayt Jala, located in the Nahiya of Jabal Quds of the Liwa of Al-Quds. The population was 245 households; 6 Muslims and 239 Christians. They paid a fixed tax-rate of 33,3% on agricultural products, which included wheat, barley, olive trees, vineyards, fruit trees, occasional revenues, goats and beehives; a total of 30,000 akçe.

In 1697 Henry Maundrell passed Beit Jala, and noted that: "no Turk can live in it above two years. By virtue of this report, whether true or false, the Christians keep the Village to themselves without molestation; no Turk being willing to stake his life experimenting the truth of it."

In the 17th century, the Christians of Beit Jala offered to become Catholic if the Franciscans paid their jizya tax.

Beit Jala's inhabitants participated in the 1834 peasants' revolt in Palestine against Ibrahim Pasha, the Egyptian governor of Syria. Beit Jala's residents were believed to have taken part in the looting of Egyptian property and on 31 May, Egyptian troops assaulted the village. Ibrahim Pasha put a stop to the attack, but at least 33 men and women were killed in the attack. In addition, the village's livestock was seized. The attack on Beit Jala prompted rebels from the Ta'amira tribe, a local Bedouin tribe, to enter into Bethlehem to help bolster its defense.

In 1838, it was noted as a Greek Christian village, located in the Beni Hasan area, west of Jerusalem. The population was estimated to be around 2000 people.

By the mid-19th century, there were 10 Catholics living in Beit Jala. The Latin Patriarchate founded its first parish in Palestine in Beit Jala in 1853. The establishment of the parish faced fierce resistance by the Greek Orthodox Patriarchate and the inhabitants of Beit Jala, leading to several skirmishes and official complaints to the Ottoman authorities by both sides. A Latin church was built in Beit Jala and inaugurated on 18 April 1858. The Jerusalem Society, a Protestant movement struggled to maintain a presence in Beit Jala in the late 19th century. When a clash between Orthodox and Protestant residents ended with the death of an Orthodox girl, the village's Protestant community was evacuated to al-Karak in Transjordan for six months until compensation was paid to the family of the slain girl. In 1866, the Russian ambassador to the Ottoman Empire purchased land in Beit Jala and built a girls' school, the first Russian school to be built in Palestine. It had 60 pupils by 1880 and was assigned a Russian principal. In 1886, it became a teachers' training school and was under the administration of the Palestinian Orthodox Imperial Society.

Albert Socin found from an official Ottoman village list from about 1870 that Beit Jala had 234 houses and a population of 874 "Latins", though the population count included men, only. Martin Hartmann found that Beit Jala had 232 houses.

In 1883, the PEF's Survey of Western Palestine (SWP) described Beit Jala as: "A large and flourishing village of white well-built stone houses, on the slope of a steep hill. The water supply is artificial, with a well in the valley below. The population is said by Pere Lievin to amount to 3,000, of whom 420 are Catholics, and the rest Orthodox Greeks. There is a Greek and a Latin church in the village. There are remarkably fine groves of olives round and beneath the village, and the hill is covered with vineyards which belong to the place."

In 1896 the population of Beit Jala was estimated to be about 2,880 persons.

=== British Mandate period ===
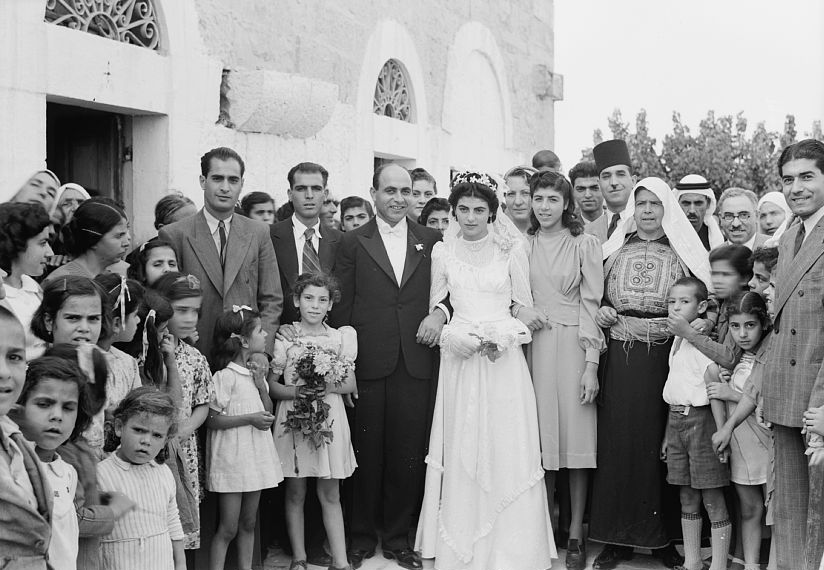
Palestinian Christian wedding, Beit Jala, 1940

In the 1922 census of Palestine, conducted by the British Mandate authorities, Beit Jala had a population of 3,101; 3,060 Christians and 41 Muslims; where the Christians consisted of 2,628 Orthodox, 358 Roman Catholics, 4 Greek Catholic (Melkites), and 1 each of the Armenian Catholic, Maronite and the Coptic Church. In the 1931 census the population had decreased to 2,731; 2,529 Christians, 198 Muslims, 3 with "no religion" and 1 Jew; in a total of 631 inhabited houses.

In the 1945 statistics the population of Beit Jala was 3,710; 200 Muslims and 3,510 Christians, with 13,307 (rural) and 737 (urban) dunams of land according to an official land and population survey. 9,860 dunams were plantations and irrigable land, 1,064 for cereals, while 737 dunams were built-up (urban) land.

By the end of the Mandate, the population of Beit Jala was apprixmately 4,000.

=== Jordanian period ===
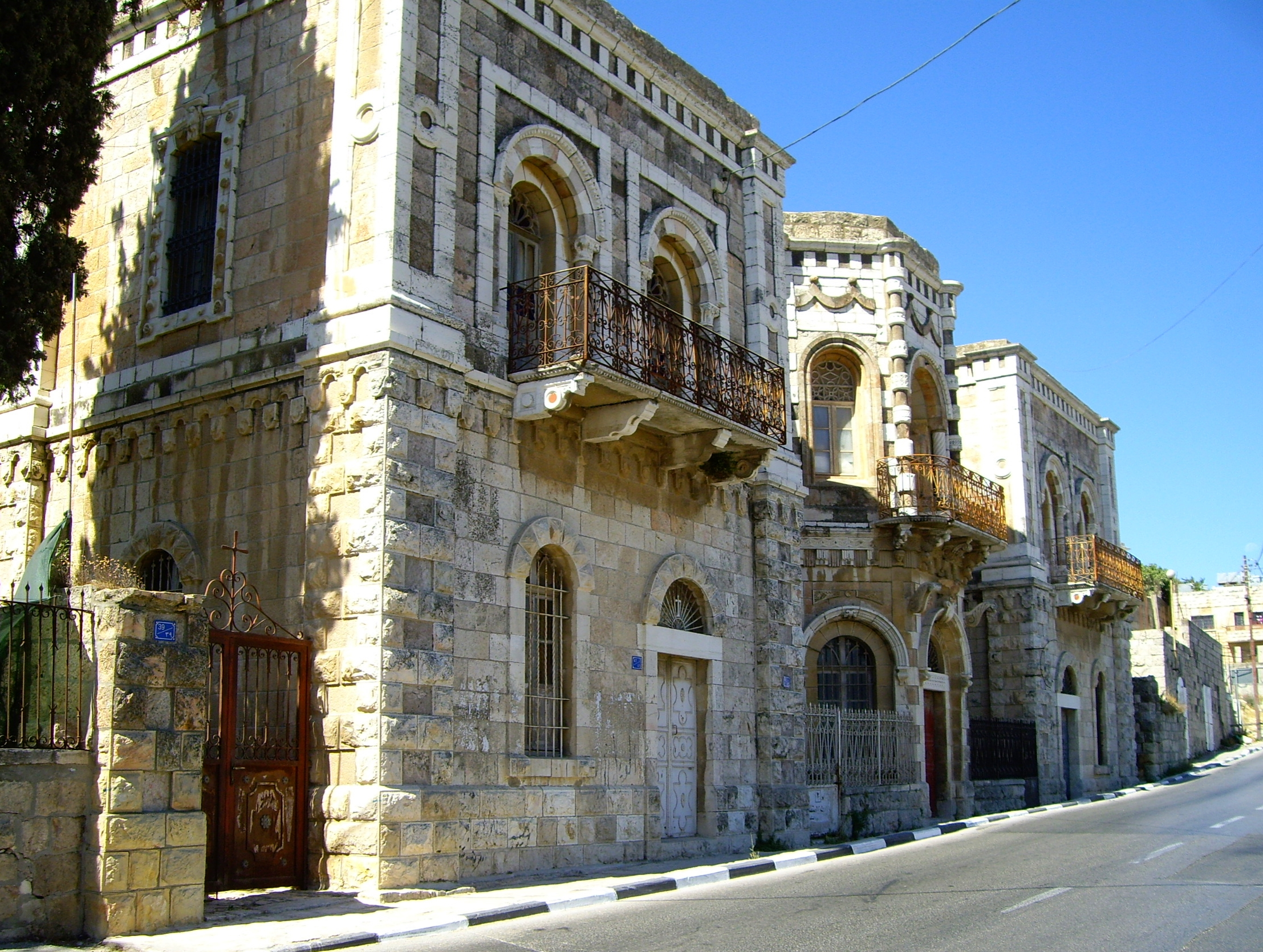
Shahwan Palace, built between 1914 and 1917 in Beit Jala.

In the wake of the 1948 Arab–Israeli War, Beit Jala came under Jordanian rule.

The Mennonite Central Committee (MCC) began relief operations for refugees in the West Bank in 1950. They also worked with Palestinians who had retained their houses and so were not technically refugees, but who had lost their land or means of making a living because of the war. As part of this relief, the MCC founded a school in Beit Jala which was still in operation as of 1979.

In 1952, an Israel Defense Forces reprisal raid in Beit Jala killed seven civilians; one man, two women and three children. A complaint was lodged that Israel had violated the General Armistice agreement. The United Nations Truce Supervision Organisation issued a condemnation of Israel for breaching the agreement.

In 1961, the population of Beit Jala was 7,966.

=== Post 1967 ===
Since the Six-Day War in 1967, Beit Jala has been under Israeli occupation. Control of the town was assumed by the Palestinian Authority following the 1993 Oslo Accords. According to the Beit Jala Municipality, the city's land holdings have been relegated under different areas of administration. Area A comprises approximately 3,500 dunums, or about 25% of the town's land, which is under Palestinian control. The remaining 75% (Area C) is under Israeli jurisdiction, and 7% of the total Area C is located inside the Municipality border.

According to ARIJ, after the war Israel confiscated 3,147 dunums of Beit Jala land in order to expand the Jerusalem municipal boundaries, later taking further land for the two Israeli settlements of Gilo and Har Gilo, the West Bank barrier and bypass roads.

During the Second Intifada, militants from the Fatah-affiliated Tanzim group used Beit Jala as a base for launching sniper and mortar attacks on the Israeli settlement of Gilo. Gilo is located on a hilltop across from Beit Jala, partially built on the lands of Beit Jala, Beit Safafa and Sharafat. The Israeli government built a concrete barrier and installed bulletproof windows in homes and schools facing Beit Jala.

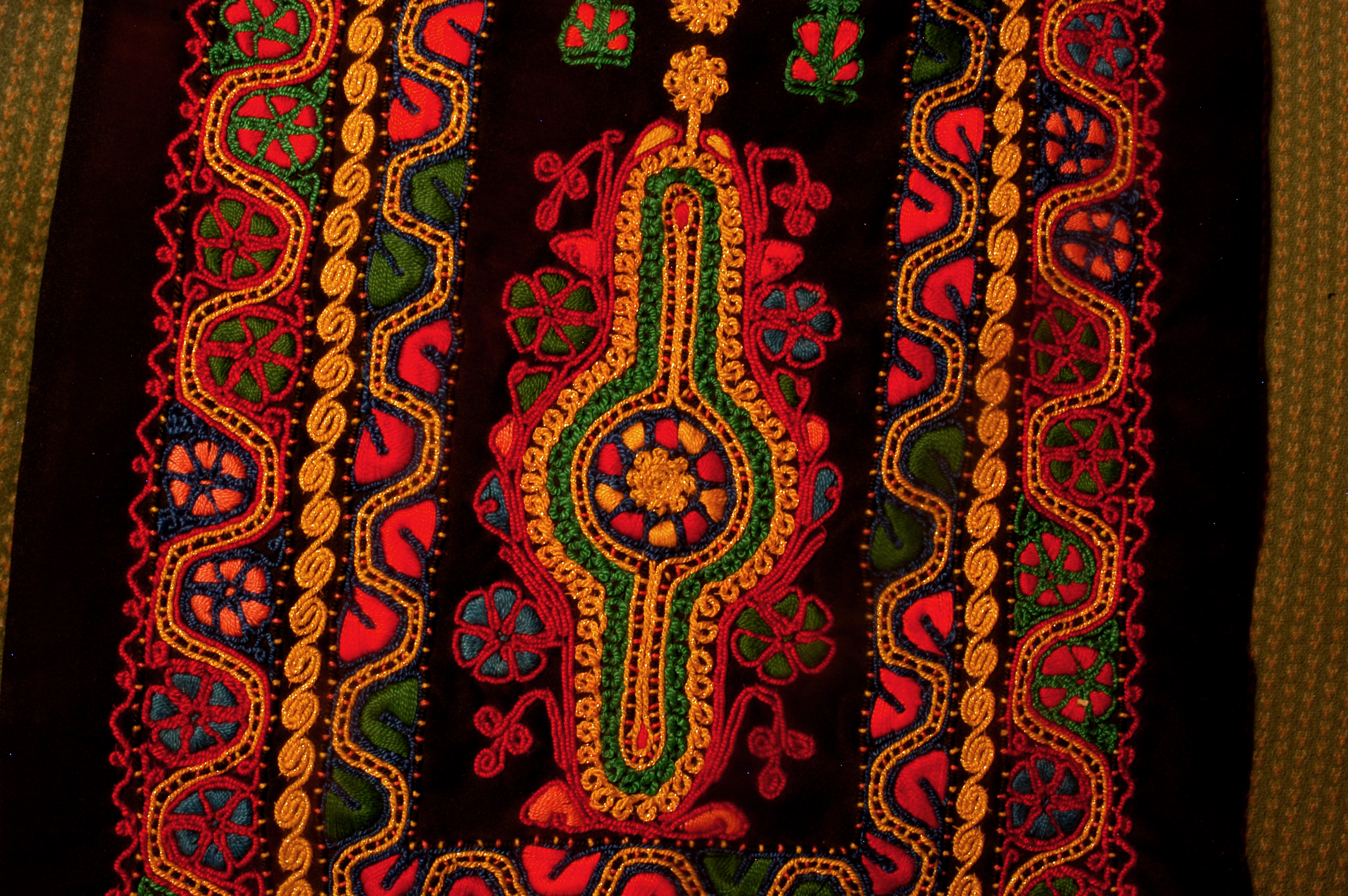
Couching stitch from Beit Jala, 2006

Militants were reported to have used the houses of Palestinian Christian residents to fire on Israeli targets in Gilo. Fighters were initially welcomed by residents, but after their homes were attacked by Israeli retaliatory fire and several fighters and residents were killed, they no longer tolerated the militants' presence. According to John Bunzl, the Israeli press used the incident to suggest there was a Christian-Muslim conflict in the incidents, with the former trying to prevent an attack until the Muslims forced them to surrender. Numerous statements taken from Christian residents appear to refute this. In August 2001, the Israeli Army occupied the northeastern corner of Beit Jala, declaring that it would only leave when the gunfire on Gilo stopped. Two days later, the troops withdrew. Palestinian militants subsequently increased their attacks, adding mortars and heavy machine guns. According to Time magazine, the Palestinian militants were not locals, but took up positions in Beit Jala due to its proximity to Gilo. In August 2010, after a long period of calm, the concrete barrier built to protect Gilo was removed.

The Israel barrier in the West Bank will separate over 50 Beit Jala families from their land; although Israel says it is a vital security measure. Palestinians believe the ultimate aim of the barrier is a land grab as it is built inside the occupied West Bank on land Palestinians want for a future independent state. Local church leaders - Latin Catholic and Greek Orthodox - have been involved in the campaign to prevent the construction of the barrier.

== Geography ==
The Israel bypass road known as the Tunnels Highway passes directly underneath Beit Jala.

== Demographics ==
This town's Christian inhabitants are made up of five Christian tribes that trace their origins as Aramaic-and Arabic speaking people who lived in that area near Bethlehem prior to the Muslim conquest in 634. At the 1931 census of Palestine the population of Beit Jala was 2,732. This included 196 Muslims, 2,532 Christians, and one Jew. In 1947, Beit Jala had a population of approximately 3,700. In 1967, according to a census conducted by the Israeli Army Command, the population was 6,041. The population in 2007 was 11,758 according to the Palestinian Central Bureau of Statistics.

== Economy ==
Cremisan Cellars, located in the Cremisan monastery, is an important local winemaker. The winery has operated since the establishment of the monastery in the 19th century. Modern equipment was introduced in 1997. Beit Jala was once famous for its pork, olive oil, apricots and stone masonry. Other economic branches are tobacco, textiles, agriculture and pharmaceuticals. The Beit Jala Pharmaceutical Manufacturing Company (formerly Jordan Chemical Laboratory) was established in 1958 to manufacture generic drug pharmaceutical products for the local market.

The West Bank Barrier is being extended to encircle the area, splitting the monastery, which would end up on the Israeli side, from the sister Salesian convent, and making access to this recreational area for Beit Jala residents very difficult. 57 Christian families are slated to lose their agricultural property.

== Health care ==
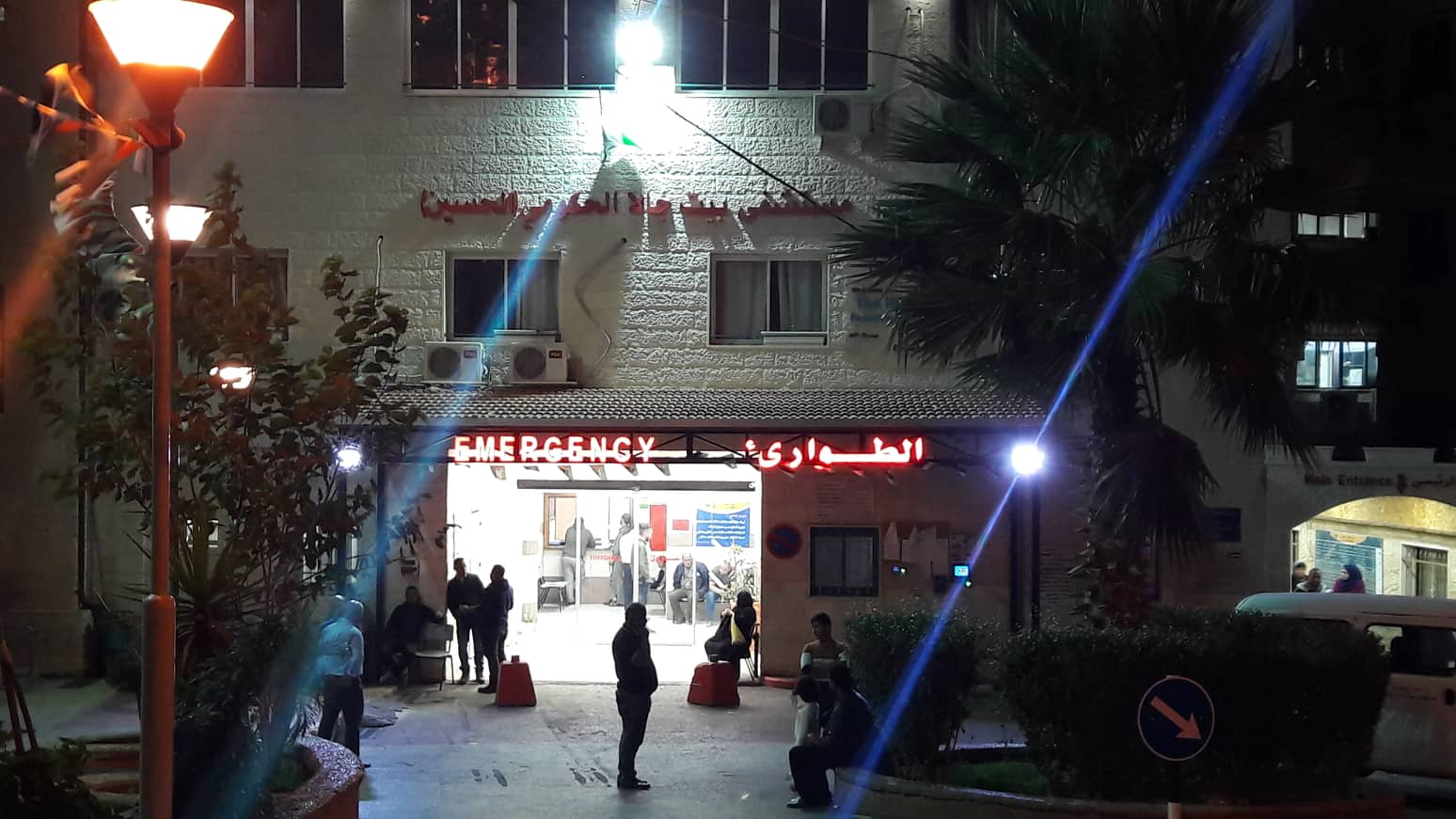
Beit Jala Governmental Hospital (Al-Hussein)

Beit Jala has a government-run 113-bed hospital, and a 77-bed privately run specialized surgery hospital operated by the Arab Society for Rehabilitation. Primary health care is provided by the Palestinian Authority Ministry of Health. In addition, there are many charities, medical institutions and private health clinics. Societies for the disabled in Beit Jala include the Bethlehem Arab Society, Lifegate Rehabilitation and House Jemima, a Dutch-founded home and daycare-center for children with mental disabilities. Al-Hussein Governmental Hospital, Beit Jala is a government hospital here.

== Schools and religious institutions ==
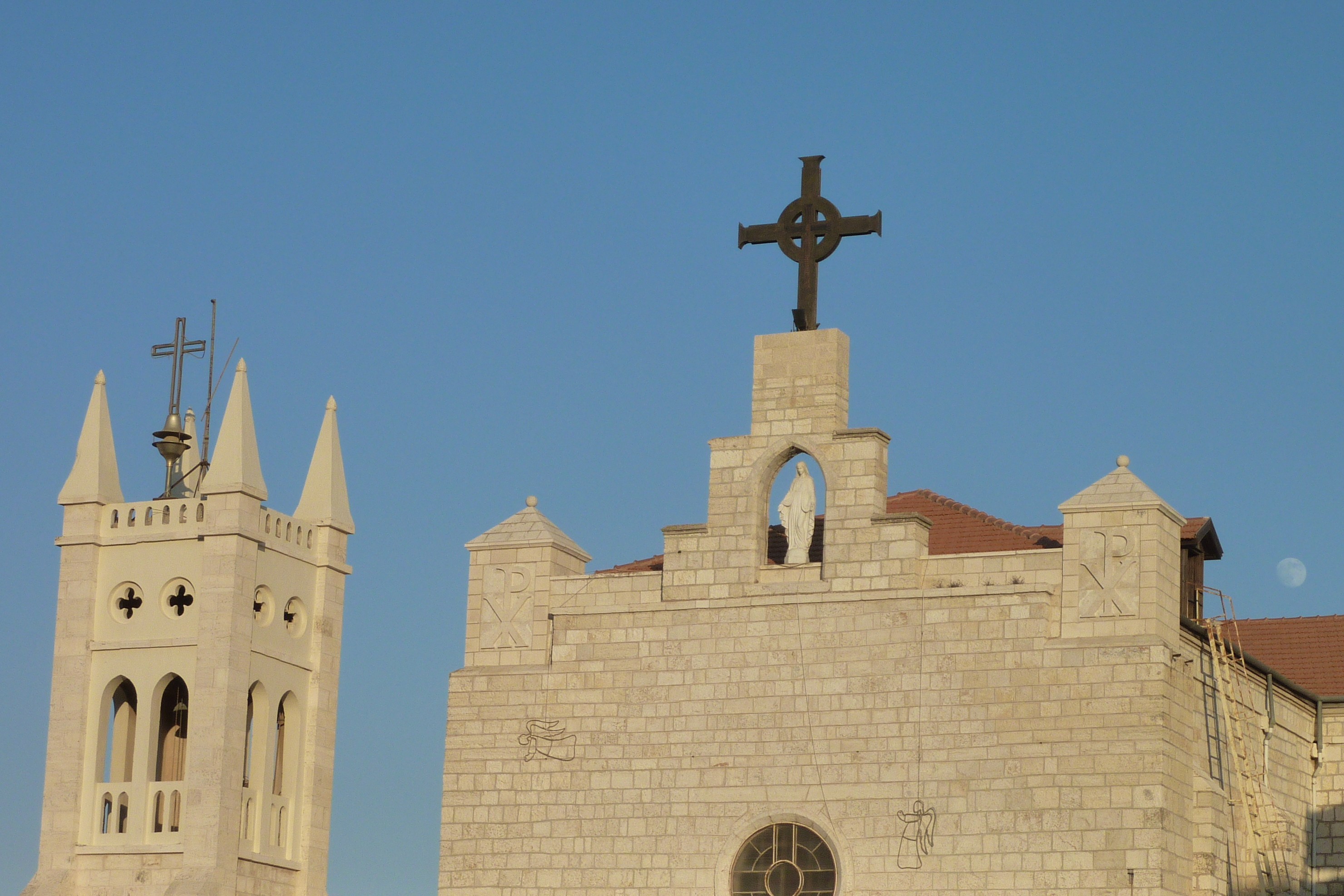
Catholic church in Beit Jala

Beit Jala is home to educational institutions run by a variety of Christian denominations, including the Arab Orthodox Benevolent Society. A Russian Orthodox school was established in 1866. The Latin Patriarchate Seminary, which supervises religious liturgical education in the Jerusalem Patriarchate, moved to Beit Jala in 1936.

The Evangelical Lutheran Church in Jordan and the Holy Land (ELCJHL) has a congregation in Beit Jala. The denomination also runs the Talitha Kumi School in Beit Jala, which was founded by Lutheran deaconesses in the 19th century and relocated in Beit Jala in 1961. The school has developed an environmental education program and operates the only bird-ringing station in the Palestinian sector. The school also runs a guesthouse.

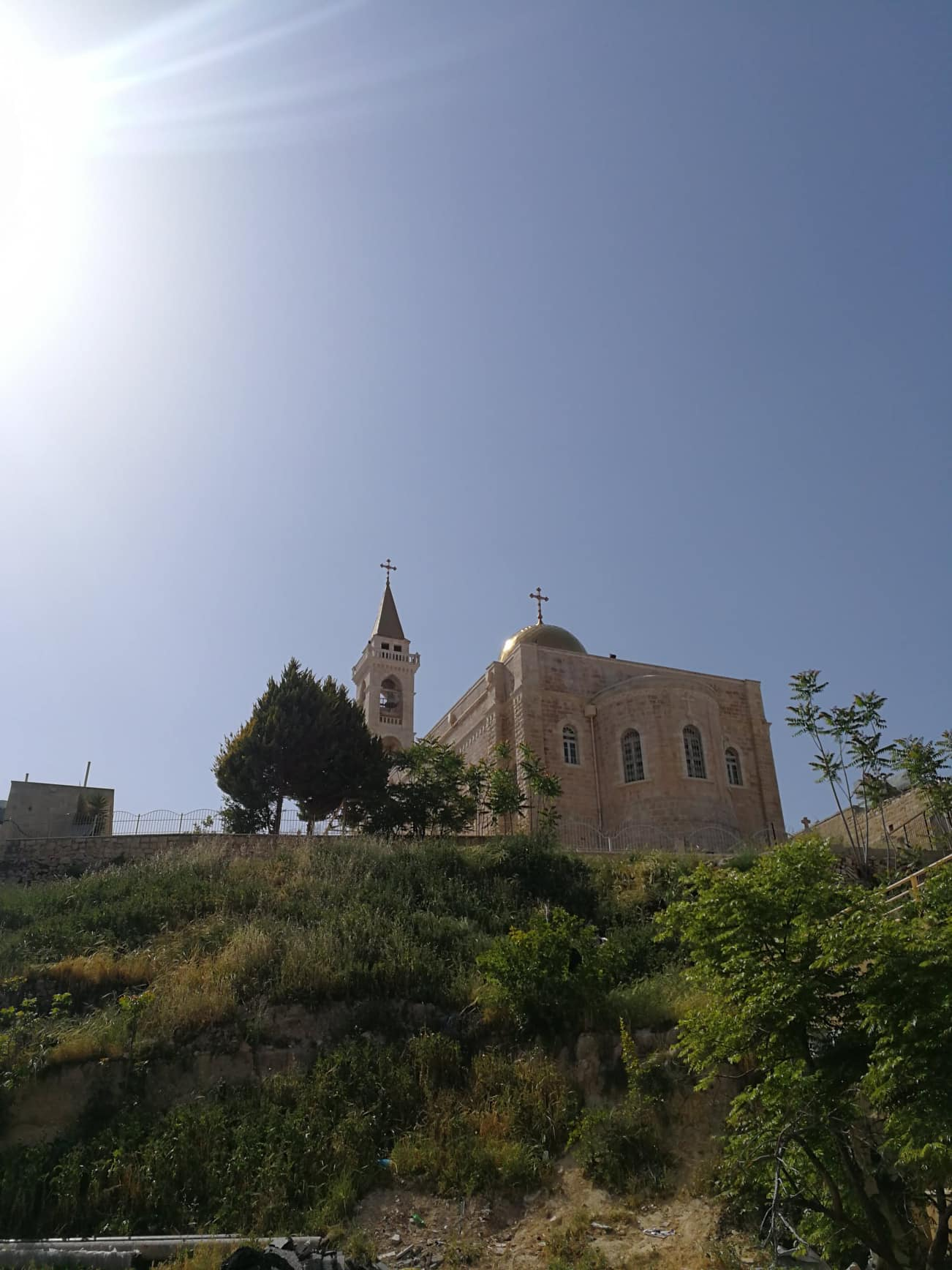
St. Nicholas Church

The Beit Jala skyline is dominated by several churches, among them the Church of the Virgin Mary, the Church of St. Michael, and the Church of Saint Nicholas. According to tradition, St. Nicholas spent four years in a cave beneath the Church. These three churches belong to the Greek Orthodox Church. The Latin Church of Annunciation is the Catholic church built in 1850.

The Syriac Orthodox Church runs the Mar Afram school in Beit Jala. In 2007, Mar Afram started offering classes in Aramaic (more specifically, Syriac Aramaic) to its students, which were taught by elderly residents of the town who still spoke the waning language fluently.

== Local government ==
In the 2005 municipal election, six seats went to the United Beit Jala list (Fatah and Palestinian People's Party), five seats went to Sons of the Land (PFLP and independents), one seat went to Independent Beit Jala Group and one candidate was elected as an independent. The most popular candidate was Raji George Jadallah Zeidan of United Jala with 2,892 votes, followed by Nadir Antoun Issa Abu Amsha of Sons of the Land with 1764 votes.

== Sports ==
The Beit Jala Lions is a rugby club active in Beit Jala since 2007. Hailed as the first all-Palestinian rugby team in history, the team is made up almost exclusively of residents of Beit Jala.

== Prominent people from Beit Jala ==
- Tawfiq Canaan
- Toni Qattan
- Ghassan Zaqtan

== International relations ==
Beit Jala is twin or sister cities with:

- La Calera, Chile
- Aubervilliers, France
- Bergisch Gladbach, Germany
- Jena, Germany
- Varazze, Italy
- Santa María del Mar, Peru

Beit Jala has friendship agreements with:

- Grenoble, France
- Reggio Emilia, Italy
- Trento, Italy

Representatives from Beit Jala and Valfabbrica, Italy, signed a Declaration of Intent in 2012.

== See also ==
- Palestinian Christians
- Palestinian diaspora
- West Bank

== Bibliography ==
- Barron, J.B., ed. (1923). Palestine: Report and General Abstracts of the Census of 1922. Government of Palestine.
- Clermont-Ganneau, C.S. (1899). [ARP] Archaeological Researches in Palestine 1873-1874, translated from the French by J. McFarlane. Vol. 1. London: Palestine Exploration Fund. (pp. 457 -459)
- Conder, C.R.; Kitchener, H.H. (1883). The Survey of Western Palestine: Memoirs of the Topography, Orography, Hydrography, and Archaeology. Vol. 3. London: Committee of the Palestine Exploration Fund.
- Dauphin, C. (1998). La Palestine byzantine, Peuplement et Populations. BAR International Series 726 (in French). Vol. III : Catalogue. Oxford: Archeopress. ISBN 0-860549-05-4. Archived from the original on 2023-03-09. (p. 915)
- Government of Jordan, Department of Statistics (1964). First Census of Population and Housing. Volume I: Final Tables; General Characteristics of the Population (PDF). Archived (PDF) from the original on 2015-04-03.
- Government of Palestine, Department of Statistics (1945). Village Statistics, April, 1945. Archived from the original on 2019-04-02.
- Guérin, V. (1868). Description Géographique Historique et Archéologique de la Palestine (in French). Vol. 1: Judee, pt. 1. Paris: L'Imprimerie Nationale. (pp. 113- 119)
- Hadawi, S. (1970). Village Statistics of 1945: A Classification of Land and Area ownership in Palestine. Palestine Liberation Organization Research Center. Archived from the original on 2018-12-08.
- Hartmann, M. (1883). "Die Ortschaftenliste des Liwa Jerusalem in dem türkischen Staatskalender für Syrien auf das Jahr 1288 der Flucht (1871)". Zeitschrift des Deutschen Palästina-Vereins. 6: 102–149.
- Hütteroth, W.-D.; Abdulfattah, K. (1977). Historical Geography of Palestine, Transjordan and Southern Syria in the Late 16th Century. Erlanger Geographische Arbeiten, Sonderband 5. Erlangen, Germany: Vorstand der Fränkischen Geographischen Gesellschaft. ISBN 3-920405-41-2. Archived from the original on 2023-01-17.
- Kildani, Hanna (2010). Modern Christianity in the Holy Land. AuthorHouse. ISBN 9781449052843. Archived from the original on 2023-12-12.
- Maundrell, H. (1703). A Journey from Aleppo to Jerusalem: At Easter, A. D. 1697. Oxford: Printed at the Theatre.
- Mills, E., ed. (1932). Census of Palestine 1931. Population of Villages, Towns and Administrative Areas. Jerusalem: Government of Palestine.
- Palmer, E.H. (1881). The Survey of Western Palestine: Arabic and English Name Lists Collected During the Survey by Lieutenants Conder and Kitchener, R. E. Transliterated and Explained by E.H. Palmer. Committee of the Palestine Exploration Fund.
- Pococke, R. (1745). A description of the East, and some other countries. Vol. 2. London: Printed for the author, by W. Bowyer. (Pococke, 1745, vol 2, p. 45; cited in Robinson and Smith, 1841, vol 2, p. 322)
- Pringle, D. (1993). The Churches of the Crusader Kingdom of Jerusalem: A-K (excluding Acre and Jerusalem). Vol. I. Cambridge University Press. ISBN 0-521-39036-2.
- Robinson, E.; Smith, E. (1841). Biblical Researches in Palestine, Mount Sinai and Arabia Petraea: A Journal of Travels in the year 1838. Vol. 1. Boston: Crocker & Brewster. (p. 322 )
- Robinson, E.; Smith, E. (1841). Biblical Researches in Palestine, Mount Sinai and Arabia Petraea: A Journal of Travels in the year 1838. Vol. 2. Boston: Crocker & Brewster.
- Robinson, E.; Smith, E. (1841). Biblical Researches in Palestine, Mount Sinai and Arabia Petraea: A Journal of Travels in the year 1838. Vol. 3. Boston: Crocker & Brewster.
- Schick, C. (1896). "Zur Einwohnerzahl des Bezirks Jerusalem". Zeitschrift des Deutschen Palästina-Vereins. 19: 120–127.
- Singer, A. (1994). Palestinian Peasants and Ottoman Officials: Rural Administration Around Sixteenth-Century Jerusalem. Cambridge University Press. ISBN 9780521476799. Archived from the original on 2023-12-12.
- Singer, A. (2002). Constructing Ottoman Beneficence: An Imperial Soup Kitchen in Jerusalem. Albany: State University of New York Press. ISBN 0-7914-5352-9. Archived from the original on 2023-12-12.
- Socin, A. (1879). "Alphabetisches Verzeichniss von Ortschaften des Paschalik Jerusalem". Zeitschrift des Deutschen Palästina-Vereins. 2: 135–163.
- Toledano, E. (1984). "The Sanjaq of Jerusalem in the Sixteenth Century: Aspects of Topography and Population". Archivum Ottomanicum. 9: 279–319. Archived from the original on 2016-03-05.
