= Sisters Olive Trees of Noah =

Grove of olive trees in Lebanon

Coordinates: 34.2016°N 35.8231°E

The Sisters Olive Trees of Noah are a grove of sixteen olive trees in the Lebanese town of Bcheale.

According to local folklore, the trees are at least 5,000 years old, perhaps even 6,000 years old or older. In 2024, a study using carbon dating found the oldest tree to be only 1,163 years old, plus or minus 131 years. However, precise carbon dating is not possible because the central heartwood has rotted away over time, leaving a hollow inner cavity. It is one the oldest known olive tree in the world.

Folk legend also ascribes The Sisters as the source of the olive branch returned to Noah's Ark at the waning of the Biblical Flood. The trees still produce olives, and a preservation effort was undertaken by the non-profit organization Sisters Olive Oil, which marketed oil from these olives.

== See also ==
- List of individual trees
- List of oldest trees
