= Har Gilo =

Israeli settlement in the West Bank

Har Gilo: הר גילה, הַר גִּלֹה (Hebrew); هار جيلو (Arabic)
- Israeli settlement
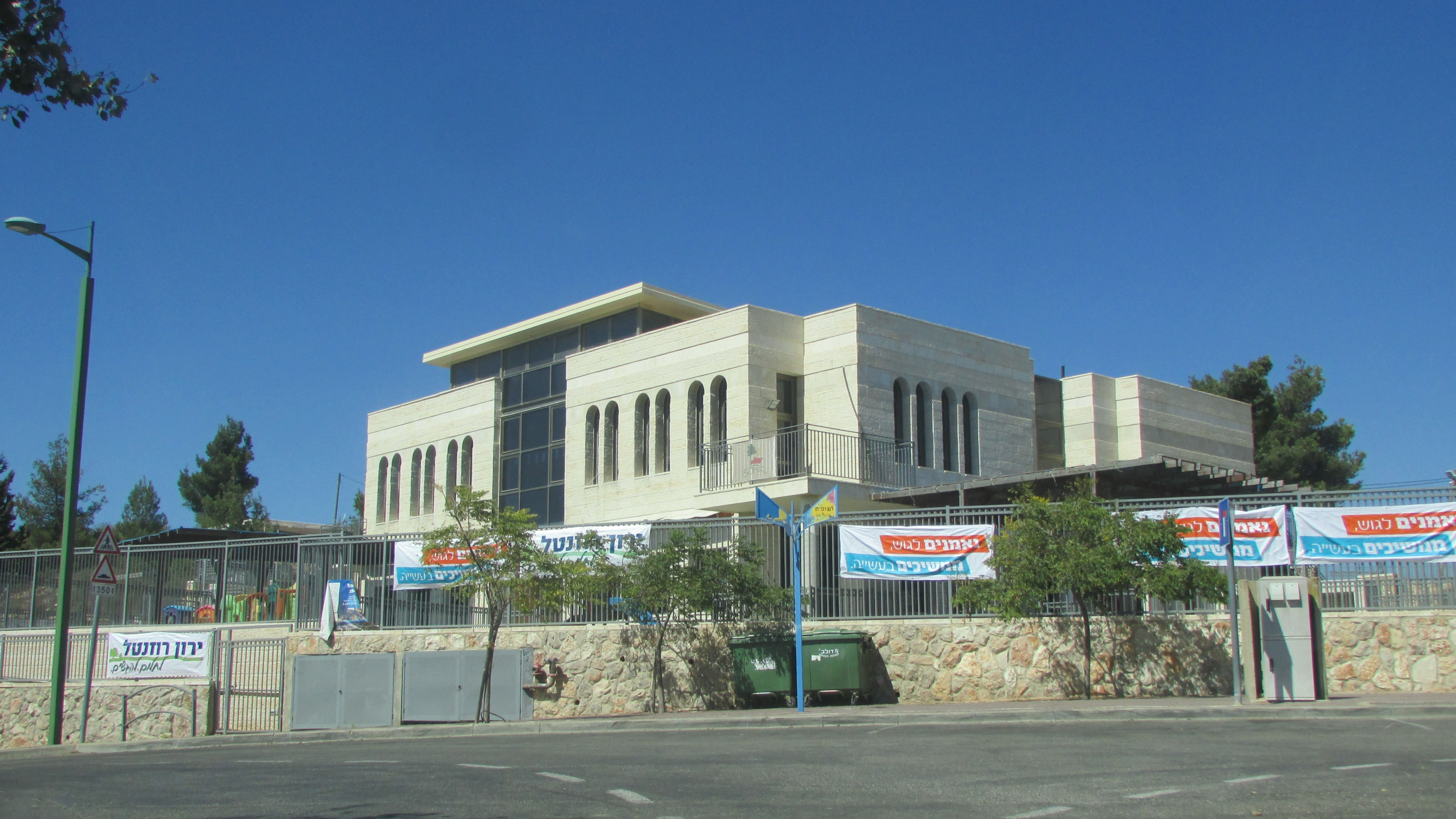
- Etymology: Mount Gilo
- Location within Jerusalem District
- Coordinates: 31°43′19″N 35°10′17″E
- Country: Palestine
- District: Judea and Samaria Area
- Council: Gush Etzion
- Region: West Bank
- Founded: 1968
- Population (2024): 1,633

Har Gilo (Hebrew: הַר גִּלֹה, lit. 'Mount Gilo'; Arabic: هار جيلو) is an Israeli settlement in the West Bank, organized as a community settlement, located about 2 kilometers west of the Palestinian city of Bethlehem and 5 kilometers south of Jerusalem, in the northern Judean hills.

The international community considers Israeli settlements in the West Bank illegal under international law, but the Israeli government disputes this.

== History ==
According to the Applied Research Institute–Jerusalem (ARIJ), Israel confiscated land from two Palestinian villages/towns in order to construct Har Gilo:

- 92 dunams from al-Walaja,
- the remaining, totaling 271 dunams, from Beit Jala

Due to Har Gilo's strategic location, the Turkish, British and Jordanian armies all had bases there. An Israel Defense Forces base was established after the Six-Day War in June 1967. The civilian settlement of Har Gilo was established on Hanukkah 1968. It is named after the biblical Gilo (Joshua 15:51) in the mountains of the Tribe of Juda. It is considered part of Gush Etzion. In 2007, Har Gilo had a population of 462. According to Peace Now, Har Gilo breaks the territorial contiguity of a Palestinian state and its close proximity to Al Walaja and Beit Jala will make it difficult to include within Israel's final boundaries. The settlement lies within the Israeli West Bank barrier, constructed in the early 2000s, which passes just outside the settlement, separating it from the neighbouring villages.

== Status under international law ==
Like all Israeli settlements in the Israeli-occupied territories, Har Gilo is considered illegal under international law, though Israeli disputes this. The international community considers Israeli settlements to violate the Fourth Geneva Convention's prohibition on the transfer of an occupying power's civilian population into occupied territory. Israel disputes that the Fourth Geneva Convention applies to the Palestinian territories as they had not been legally held by a sovereign prior to Israel taking control of them. This view has been rejected by the International Court of Justice and the International Committee of the Red Cross.

== Geography ==
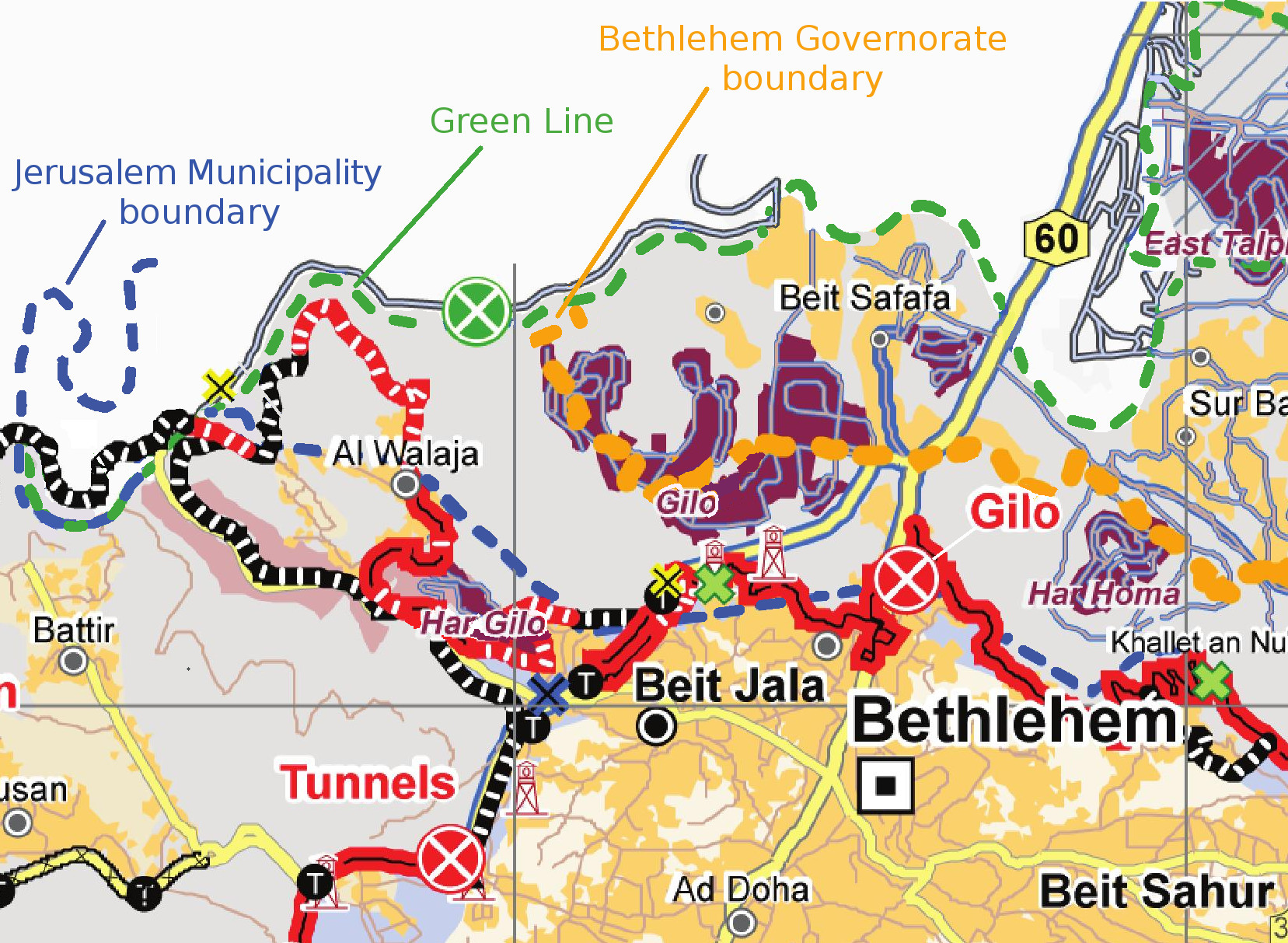
Map of the Har Gilo region

Har Gilo is located between the Palestinian villages of al-Walaja and Beit Jala, south of the Jerusalem boundary and adjacent to the peak of Mount Gilo.

== Archaeology ==
Archaeological excavations in 1998 revealed the remains of two buildings and a rock-cut winepress, both dating back to the Iron Age III (586–539 BCE). Additional pottery shards were indicative of activity at the site from the early Islamic period.
